= 1971 Masters Tournament =

- Front cover of the 1971 Masters Guide

Tournament information
- Dates: April 8–11, 1971
- Location: Augusta, Georgia; 33.503°N 82.020°W
- Course: Augusta National Golf Club
- Organized by: Augusta National Golf Club
- Tour: PGA Tour

Statistics
- Par: 72
- Length: 6,980 yards (6,383 m)
- Field: 77 players, 48 after cut
- Cut: 150 (+6)
- Winner's share: $25,000

Champion
- (United States) Charles Coody
- 279 (−9)

Location map
- Location in the United States Location in Georgia

The 1971 Masters Tournament was the 35th Masters Tournament, held April 8–11 at Augusta National Golf Club in Augusta, Georgia. Charles Coody won his only major championship, two strokes ahead of runners-up Johnny Miller and Jack Nicklaus.

Miller was six-under for the Sunday round and, playing two groups ahead of the final two-some, his birdie on 14 would open up a two-shot lead when Coody subsequently bogeyed the hole, but could not hold on to win. Coody, co-leader with Nicklaus entering the round, rebounded from his bogey at 14 with two consecutive birdies and parred the final two holes while Miller, 23, bogeyed two of the last three holes. It was a bit of redemption for Coody, who bogeyed the final three holes in 1969 to finish two strokes back. It was Coody's third and final win on the PGA Tour.

Future 3-time U.S. Open champion Hale Irwin made his Masters debut in 1971 and tied for 13th place. It was the final Masters for two champions: 1948 winner Claude Harmon, withdrew during the first round and 1955 champion Cary Middlecoff during the second.

Dave Stockton won the twelfth Par 3 contest on Wednesday with a score of 23.

For the first time in its history, the Masters was not the first major championship of the year. The 1971 PGA Championship was played in Florida in February, and was won by Nicklaus. The co-leader entering Sunday, his attempt to secure the second leg of the grand slam came up short on the back nine on Sunday, as he shot 37 for an even-par 72.

== Field ==
1. Masters champions

George Archer, Gay Brewer (9), Billy Casper (2,8,9,11), Doug Ford, Bob Goalby, Ralph Guldahl, Claude Harmon, Herman Keiser, Cary Middlecoff, Jack Nicklaus (2,3,8,10,11), Arnold Palmer (10), Gary Player (3,8), Gene Sarazen, Sam Snead (8), Art Wall Jr.

- Jack Burke Jr., Jimmy Demaret, Ben Hogan, Byron Nelson, and Henry Picard did not play.

The following categories only apply to Americans

2. U.S. Open champions (last five years)

Orville Moody (8)

- Lee Trevino (9,11) did not play.

3. The Open champions (last five years)

4. PGA champions (last five years)

Julius Boros (8,9), Raymond Floyd (10,11), Al Geiberger, Don January (8), Dave Stockton (8,10)

5. The first eight finishers in the 1970 U.S. Amateur

William C. Campbell (a), Jim Gabrielsen (a), Vinny Giles (7,a), Tom Kite (7,a), Steve Melnyk (6,a), Jim Simons (a), Richard Spears (a), Lanny Wadkins (6,7,a)

6. Previous two U.S. Amateur and Amateur champions

7. Members of the 1970 U.S. Eisenhower Trophy team

Allen Miller (a)

8. Top 24 players and ties from the 1970 Masters Tournament

Tommy Aaron (11), Miller Barber (9,11), Frank Beard (11), Deane Beman, Charles Coe (a), Charles Coody, Bert Greene, Dave Hill (9,11), Howie Johnson (9), Gene Littler (9,10,11), Dick Lotz (10), Bob Lunn (9), Bob Murphy (10), Chi-Chi Rodríguez, Tom Weiskopf, Terry Wilcox, Bert Yancey

9. Top 16 players and ties from the 1970 U.S. Open

Joel Goldstrand, Bobby Mitchell, Ken Still (11), Larry Ziegler

10. Top eight players and ties from 1970 PGA Championship

Larry Hinson

11. Members of the U.S. 1969 Ryder Cup team

Dale Douglass, Dan Sikes

12. One player, either amateur or professional, not already qualified, selected by a ballot of ex-Masters champions.

Homero Blancas

13. Leading eight players, not already qualified, from a points list based on finishes in PGA Tour events since the previous Masters

Dave Eichelberger, Gibby Gilbert, Lou Graham, Jerry Heard, Hale Irwin, Johnny Miller, John Schlee, Tom Shaw

14. Foreign invitations

Bob Charles (8,9), Gary Cowan (5,a), Bruce Crampton (10), Roberto De Vicenzo (3), Bruce Devlin (9), David Graham, Harold Henning, Tommy Horton, Hsieh Yung-yo, Tony Jacklin (2,3,8,9), Takaaki Kono (8), John Lister, Sukree Onsham, Peter Oosterhuis

- Numbers in brackets indicate categories that the player would have qualified under had they been American.

== Round summaries ==
=== First round ===
Thursday, April 8, 1971

Place	Player	Score	To par
1	(United States) Charles Coody	66	−6
T2	(United States) Raymond Floyd	69	−3
T2	(United States) Hale Irwin	69	−3
T2	(United States) Don January	69	−3
T2	(United States) Bob Lunn	69	−3
T2	(United States) Bob Murphy	69	−3
T7	(United States) Dale Douglass	70	−2
T7	(United States) Jack Nicklaus	70	−2
T9	(United States) Art Wall Jr.	71	−1
T9	(United States) Tom Weiskopf	71	−1
T9	(United States) Bert Yancey	71	−1

=== Second round ===
Friday, April 9, 1971

Place	Player	Score	To par
1	(United States) Don January	69-69=138	−6
T2	(United States) Charles Coody	66-73=139	−5
T2	(United States) Bob Murphy	69-70=139	−5
4	(United States) Tom Weiskopf	71-69=140	−4
T5	(United States) Dale Douglass	70-71=141	−3
T5	(United States) Hale Irwin	69-72=141	−3
T5	(United States) Gene Littler	72-69=141	−3
T5	(United States) Jack Nicklaus	70-71=141	−3
T9	(Australia) Bruce Devlin	72-70=142	−2
T9	(United States) Bobby Mitchell	72-70=142	−2

=== Third round ===
Saturday, April 10, 1971

Place	Player	Score	To par
T1	(United States) Charles Coody	66-73-70=209	−7
T1	(United States) Jack Nicklaus	70-71-68=209	−7
3	(United States) Don January	69-69-73=211	−5
T4	(United States) Hale Irwin	69-72-71=212	−4
T4	(United States) Tom Weiskopf	71-69-72=212	−4
6	(United States) Johnny Miller	72-73-68=213	−3
T7	(Australia) Bruce Devlin	72-70-72=214	−2
T7	(United States) Gene Littler	72-69-73=214	−2
T7	(United States) Dave Stockton	72-73-69=214	−2
T10	(United States) Bob Murphy	69-70-76=215	−1
T10	(South Africa) Gary Player	72-72-71=215	−1
T10	(United States) Ken Still	72-71-72=215	−1

=== Final round ===
Sunday, April 11, 1971

==== Final leaderboard ====
Champion
Silver Cup winner (low amateur)
(a) = amateur
(c) = past champion

Top 10
Place	Player	Score	To par	Money (US$)
1	(United States) Charles Coody	66-73-70-70=279	−9	25,000
T2	(United States) Johnny Miller	72-73-68-68=281	−7	17,500
T2	(United States) Jack Nicklaus (c)	70-71-68-72=281	−7	17,500
T4	(United States) Don January	69-69-73-72=283	−5	9,050
T4	(United States) Gene Littler	72-69-73-69=283	−5	9,050
T6	(South Africa) Gary Player (c)	72-72-71-69=284	−4	5,600
T6	(United States) Ken Still	72-71-72-69=284	−4	5,600
T6	(United States) Tom Weiskopf	71-69-72-72=284	−4	5,600
T9	(United States) Frank Beard	74-73-69-70=286	−2	3,767
T9	(Argentina) Roberto De Vicenzo	76-69-72-69=286	−2	3,767
T9	(United States) Dave Stockton	72-73-69-72=286	−2	3,767

Leaderboard below the top 10
Place	Player	Score	To par	Money ($)
12	(United States) Bert Greene	73-73-71-70=287	−1	3,300
T13	(United States) Billy Casper (c)	72-73-71-72=288	E	3,000
T13	(Australia) Bruce Devlin	72-70-72-74=288	E	3,000
T13	(United States) Raymond Floyd	69-75-73-71=288	E	3,000
T13	(United States) Hale Irwin	69-72-71-76=288	E	3,000
T13	(United States) Bob Murphy	69-70-76-73=288	E	3,000
T18	(Australia) Bruce Crampton	73-72-74-70=289	+1	2,650
T18	(United States) Arnold Palmer (c)	73-72-71-73=289	+1	2,650
T20	(United States) Dave Eichelberger	76-71-70-73=290	+2	2,450
T20	(United States) Orville Moody	79-69-70-72=290	+2	2,450
T22	(United States) Tommy Aaron	76-72-74-69=291	+3	2,250
T22	(United States) Bobby Mitchell	72-70-74-75=291	+3	2,250
T24	(United States) Al Geiberger	73-75-72-72=292	+4	2,100
T24	(United States) Dick Lotz	77-72-73-70=292	+4	2,100
T24	(United States) Steve Melnyk (a)	73-70-75-74=292	+4	0
T27	(United States) Dale Douglass	70-71-76-76=293	+5	1,750
T27	(United States) Dave Hill	74-73-70-76=293	+5	1,750
T27	(United States) Art Wall Jr. (c)	71-76-72-74=293	+5	1,750
T30	(United States) Larry Hinson	75-71-76-72=294	+6	1,750
T30	(Chinese Taipei) Hsieh Yung-yo	75-69-77-73=294	+6	1,750
T30	(United States) Chi-Chi Rodríguez	73-75-71-75=294	+6	1,750
T30	(United States) Larry Ziegler	73-70-77-74=294	+6	1,750
34	(United States) Bob Lunn	69-76-81-69=295	+7	1,675
35	(United States) George Archer (c)	73-74-78-71=296	+8	1,675
T36	(United States) Bob Goalby (c)	76-73-74-74=297	+9	1,675
T36	(Australia) David Graham	75-72-77-73=297	+9	1,675
T36	(England) Tony Jacklin	73-76-76-72=297	+9	1,675
T36	(United States) John Schlee	76-74-73-74=297	+9	1,675
T36	(United States) Tom Shaw	77-70-74-76=297	+9	1,675
41	(South Africa) Harold Henning	72-75-77-74=298	+10	1,600
T42	(United States) Tom Kite (a)	76-74-70-80=300	+12	0
T42	(New Zealand) John Lister	78-72-75-75=300	+12	1,600
T42	(United States) Allen Miller (a)	76-73-81-70=300	+12	0
45	(United States) Gibby Gilbert	72-76-75-79=302	+14	1,600
T46	(United States) Doug Ford (c)	75-75-77-76=303	+15	1,600
T46	(United States) Howie Johnson	73-74-82-74=303	+15	1,600
48	(United States) Jerry Heard	76-74-75-79=304	+16	1,600
CUT	(United States) Jim Gabrielsen (a)	76-75=151	+7	
CUT	(United States) Vinny Giles (a)	74-77=151	+7	
CUT	(United States) Lou Graham	78-73=151	+7	
CUT	(Japan) Takaaki Kono	77-74=151	+7	
CUT	(England) Peter Oosterhuis	72-79=151	+7	
CUT	(United States) Lanny Wadkins (a)	73-78=151	+7	
CUT	(United States) Miller Barber	75-77=152	+8	
CUT	(United States) Deane Beman	75-77=152	+8	
CUT	(United States) Homero Blancas	77-75=152	+8	
CUT	(United States) Julius Boros	80-72=152	+8	
CUT	(United States) Charles Coe (a)	74-78=152	+8	
CUT	(United States) Bert Yancey	71-81=152	+8	
CUT	(United States) Sam Snead (c)	76-77=153	+9	
CUT	(United States) Gay Brewer (c)	79-75=154	+10	
CUT	(United States) Dan Sikes	72-82=154	+10	
CUT	(United States) Richard Spears (a)	75-79=154	+10	
CUT	(Thailand) Sukree Onsham	77-78=155	+11	
CUT	(United States) William C. Campbell (a)	78-79=157	+13	
CUT	(United States) Jim Simons (a)	83-74=157	+13	
CUT	(New Zealand) Bob Charles	77-81=158	+14	
CUT	(Canada) Gary Cowan (a)	83-75=158	+14	
CUT	(England) Tommy Horton	82-76=158	+14	
CUT	(United States) Terry Wilcox	78-80=158	+14	
CUT	(United States) Joel Goldstrand	82-77=159	+15	
CUT	(United States) Ralph Guldahl (c)	79-84=163	+19	
CUT	(United States) Gene Sarazen (c)	83-80=163	+19	
WD	(United States) Cary Middlecoff (c)	75	+3	
WD	(United States) Herman Keiser (c)	81	+9	
WD	(United States) Claude Harmon (c)			

==== Scorecard ====
Hole	1	2	3	4	5	6	7	8	9	10	11	12	13	14	15	16	17	18
Par	4	5	4	3	4	3	4	5	4	4	4	3	5	4	5	3	4	4
(United States) Coody	−7	−8	−7	−7	−7	−7	−7	−8	−8	−8	−8	−8	−8	−7	−8	−9	−9	−9
(United States) Miller	−3	−3	−4	−5	−5	−5	−5	−6	−6	−6	−7	−8	−8	−9	−9	−8	−8	−7
(United States) Nicklaus	−8	−8	−8	−7	−6	−7	−7	−8	−8	−8	−8	−7	−7	−7	−7	−7	−7	−7

Cumulative tournament scores, relative to par
