= Masters Tournament Par 3 Contest =

Golf competition

Coordinates: 33.503°N 82.018°W

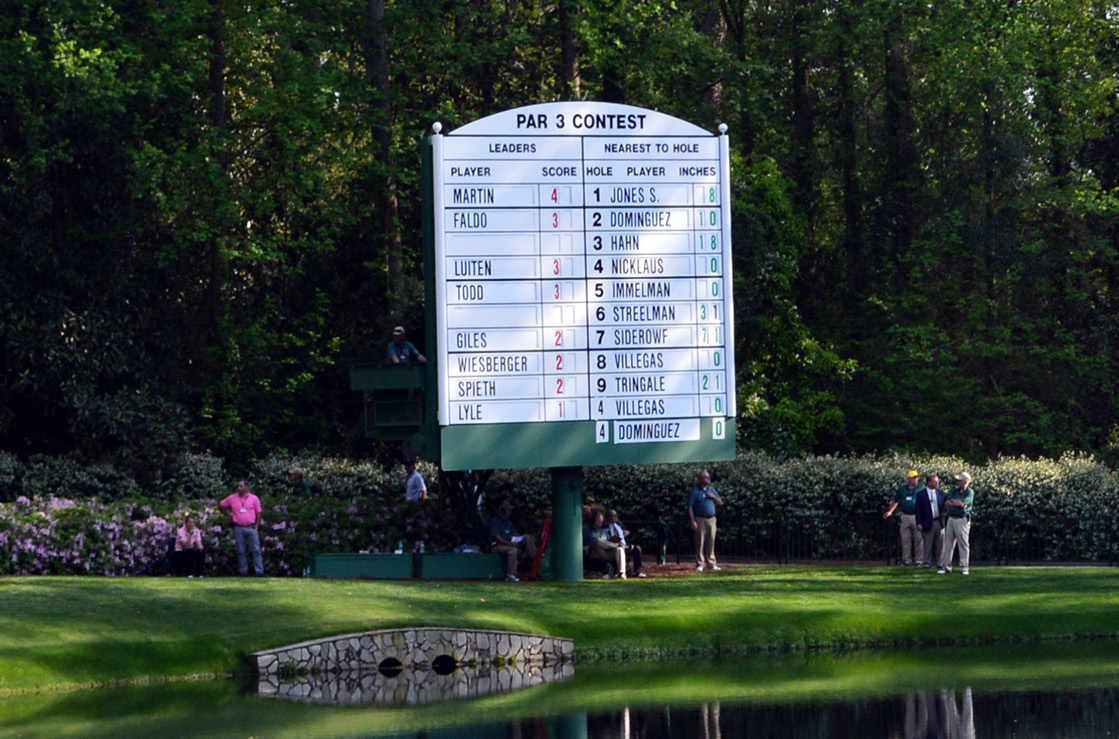
- The 2015 Masters Par 3 Contest scoreboard

Tournament information
- Location: Augusta, Georgia, U.S.
- Established: 1960
- Course: Augusta National Golf Club
- Par: 27
- Length: 1,060 yards (970 m)
- Organized by: Augusta National Golf Club
- Format: Stroke play
- Month played: April

Tournament record score
- To par: −8 Jimmy Walker (2016)

Current champion
- (England) Aaron Rai (2026)

The Masters Tournament Par 3 Contest is a semi-social golf competition that precedes the Masters Tournament at Augusta National Golf Club in Augusta, Georgia. The first Par 3 Contest was held before the 1960 tournament, and was won by three-time Masters champion Sam Snead. The contest takes place in a single round on a nine-hole, par-27 course in the northeast corner of the club's grounds, designed in 1958 by George Cobb and club founder Clifford Roberts.

Traditionally, the participants have invited family members to caddie for them, sometimes allowing them to play shots on their behalf. Through the 2026 contest, 119 holes in one have been recorded, including nine in the 2016 event.

Snead became the contest's first multiple winner in 1974, fourteen years after his first. The most recent is Tom Watson, who won his second Par 3 Contest in 2018, 36 years after his first in 1982. Pádraig Harrington is the only one with three wins; he won his first pair in consecutive years (2003, 2004), as did Sandy Lyle (1997, 1998). Seven players have multiple wins; the other three are Isao Aoki, Jay Haas, and David Toms.

Jimmy Walker holds the course record of 19 (–8), set in 2016, which included an ace.

As of 2026, the contest has been decided by a playoff on 22 occasions, and concluded with a tie three times; overall, across 64 contests, 17 of the 59 winning golfers (including ties) have been non-American. No winner of the Par 3 Contest has gone on to win the Masters in the same year.

== Winners ==
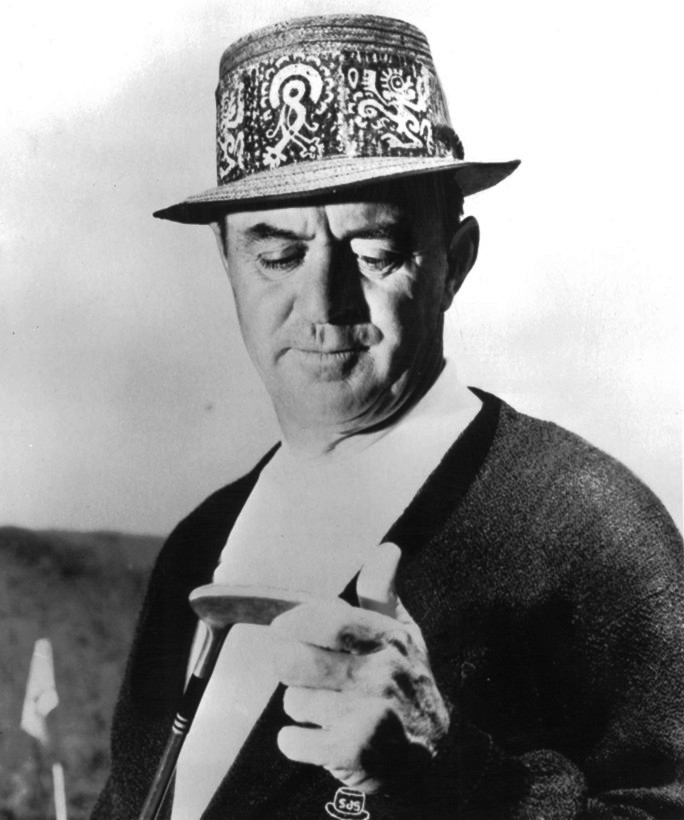
Sam Snead (pictured in 1967) won the inaugural contest in 1960, and again in 1974

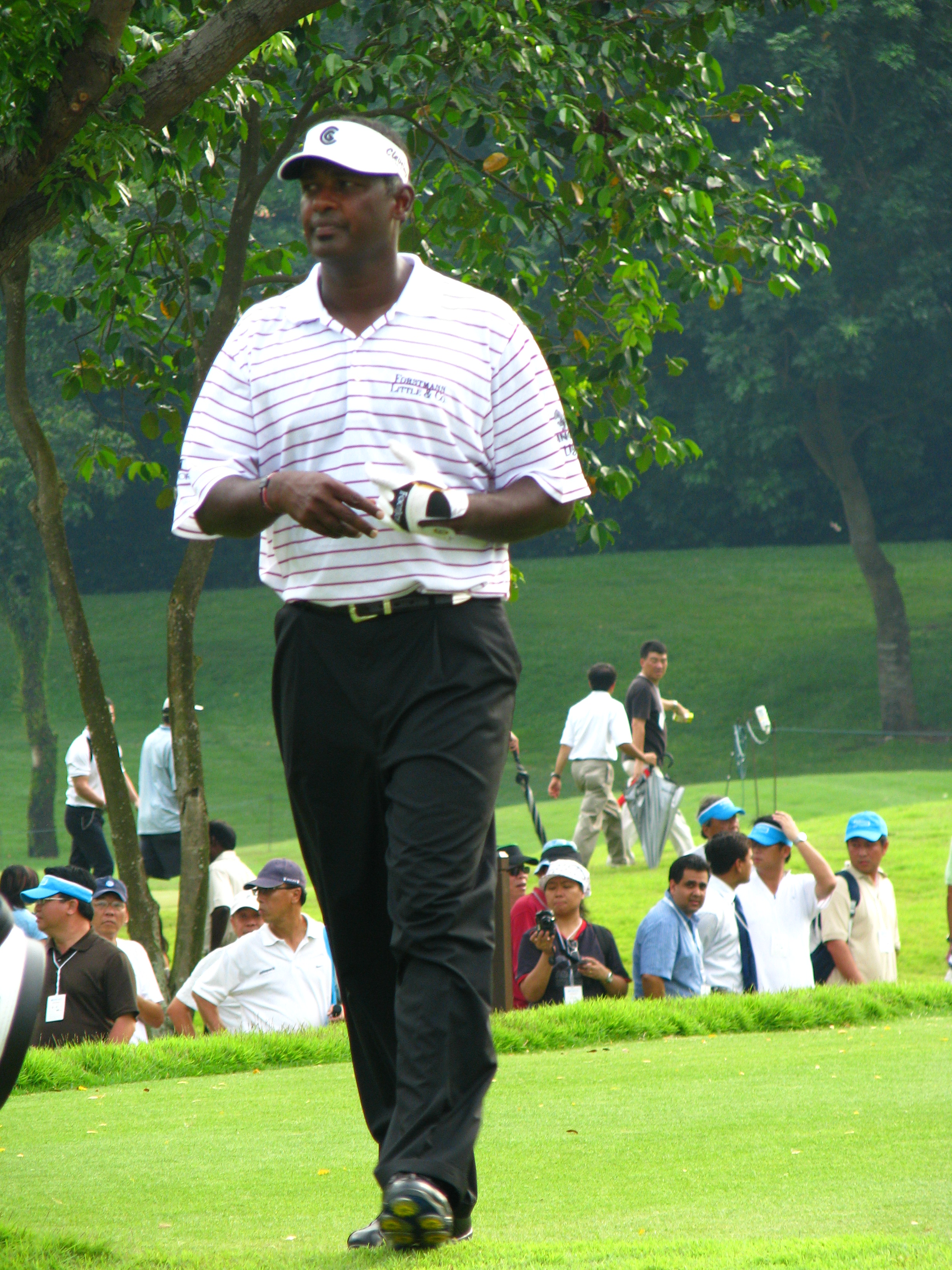
Vijay Singh (pictured in 2007) won in 1994

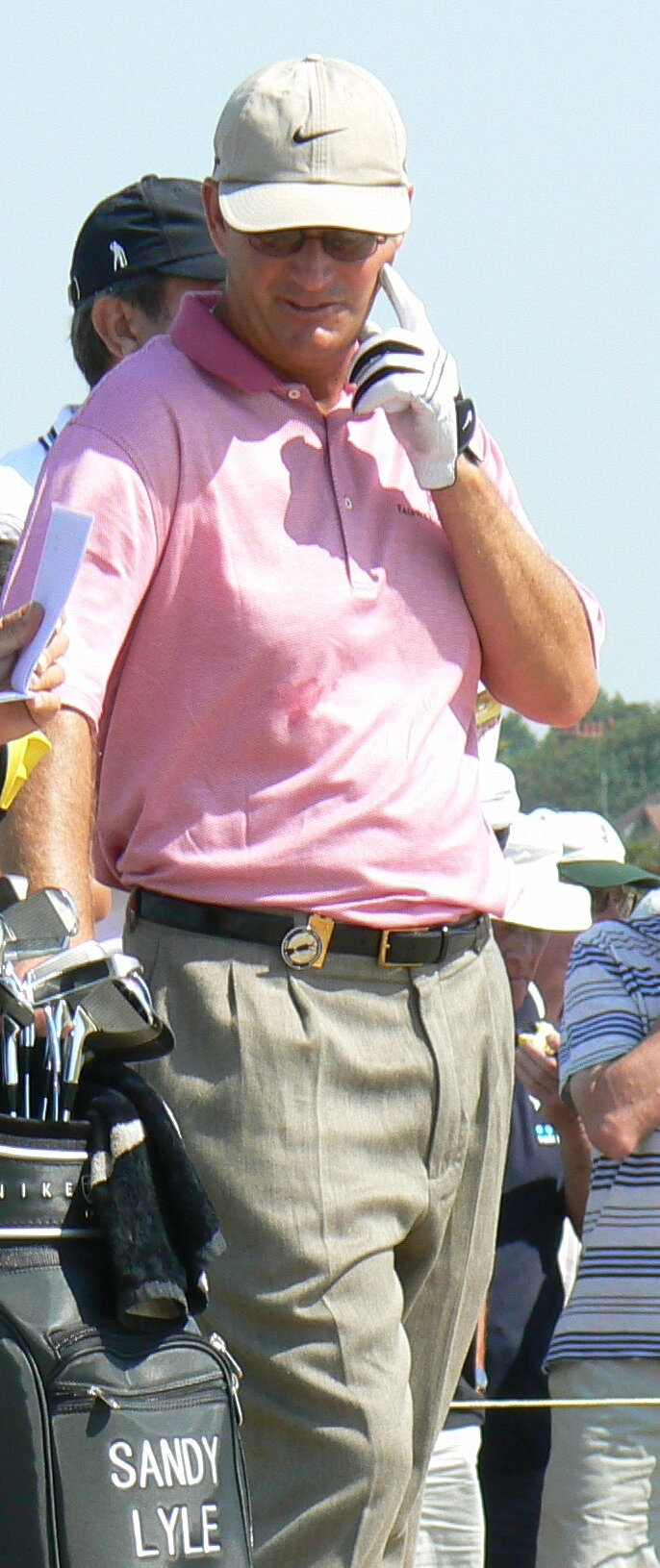
Sandy Lyle (pictured in 2006) won consecutive contests in 1997 and 1998

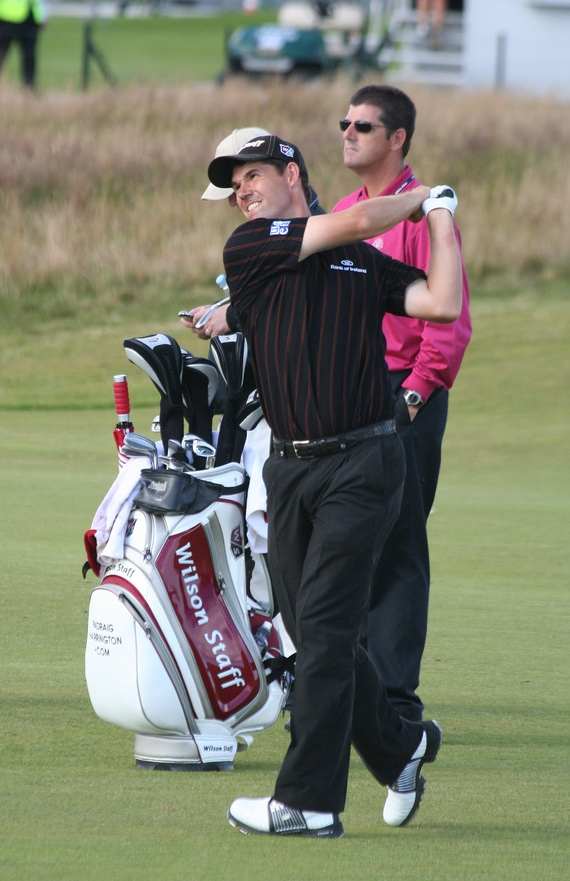
Pádraig Harrington (pictured in 2007) has three contest victories; two shared and one playoff win

Year	Winner	Country	To par^{[a]}	Masters finish	Ref.
1960	Sam Snead	United States	−4	T11	
1961	Deane Beman (a)	United States	−5	CUT	
1962	Bruce Crampton	Australia	−5	T29	
1963*	George Bayer	United States	−4	T28	
1964	Labron Harris Jr. (a)	United States	−4	43	
1965	Art Wall Jr.	United States	−7	T45	
1966	Terry Dill	United States	−5	T17	
1967*	Arnold Palmer	United States	−4	4	
1968	Bob Rosburg	United States	−5	T29	
1969*	Bob Lunn	United States	−4	CUT	
1970	Harold Henning	South Africa	−6	CUT	
1971*	Dave Stockton	United States	−4	T9	
1972	Steve Melnyk	United States	−4	T12	
1973	Gay Brewer	United States	−7	T10	
1974*	Sam Snead (2)	United States	−5	T20	
1975*	Isao Aoki	Japan	−4	CUT	
1976	Jay Haas (a)	United States	−6	CUT	
1977*	Tom Weiskopf	United States	−4	T14	
1978*	Lou Graham	United States	−5	CUT	
1979	Joe Inman	United States	−5	T23	
1980	Johnny Miller	United States	−5	T38	
1981	Isao Aoki (2)	Japan	−5	T45	
1982*	Tom Watson	United States	−4	T5	
1983	Hale Irwin	United States	−5	T6	
1984	Tommy Aaron	United States	−5	CUT	
1985	Hubert Green	United States	−5	CUT	
1986*	Gary Koch	United States	−4	T16	
1987	Ben Crenshaw	United States	−5	T4	
1988	Tsuneyuki Nakajima	Japan	−3	T33	
1989*	Bob Gilder	United States	−5	39	
1990	Raymond Floyd	United States	−4	2	
1991*	Rocco Mediate	United States	−3	T22	
1992	Davis Love III	United States	−5	T25	
1993	Chip Beck	United States	−6	2	
1994	Vijay Singh	Fiji	−5	T27	
1995*	Hal Sutton	United States	−4	CUT	
1996*	Jay Haas (2)	United States	−5	T36	
1997*	Sandy Lyle	Scotland	−5	T34	
1998	Sandy Lyle (2)	Scotland	−3	CUT	
1999	Joe Durant	United States	−5	CUT	
2000*	Chris Perry	United States	−4	T14	
2001	David Toms	United States	−5	T31	
2002*	Nick Price	Zimbabwe	−5	T20	
2003†	Pádraig Harrington	Ireland	−6	CUT	
2003†	David Toms (2)	United States	−6	T8	
2004*	Pádraig Harrington (2)	Ireland	−4	T13	
2005	Jerry Pate	United States	−5	DNP	
2006	Ben Crane	United States	−4	CUT	
2007	Mark O'Meara	United States	−5	CUT	
2008	Rory Sabbatini	South Africa	−5	CUT	
2009	Tim Clark	South Africa	−5	T13	
2010	Louis Oosthuizen	South Africa	−6	CUT	
2011	Luke Donald	England	−5	T4	
2012†	Jonathan Byrd	United States	−5	T27	
2012†	Pádraig Harrington (3)	Ireland	−5	T8	
2013*	Ted Potter Jr.	United States	−4	CUT	
2014	Ryan Moore	United States	−6	CUT	
2015*	Kevin Streelman	United States	−5	T12	
2016	Jimmy Walker	United States	−8	T29	
2017	Contest canceled due to rain				
2018	Tom Watson (2)	United States	−6	DNP	
2019*	Matt Wallace	England	−5	CUT	
2020	Contest canceled due to COVID-19 pandemic				
2021	Contest canceled due to COVID-19 pandemic				
2022†	Mackenzie Hughes	Canada	−4	T50	
2022†	Mike Weir	Canada	−4	CUT	
2023	Tom Hoge	United States	−6	CUT	
2024	Rickie Fowler	United States	−5	T30	
2025*	Nico Echavarría	Colombia	−5	51	
2026	Aaron Rai	England	−6	48	

Key
* - playoff
† - tie
(a) - amateur

== Masters champions who also won a Par 3 Contest ==
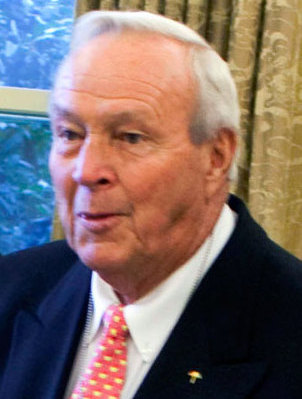
Arnold Palmer (pictured in 2009) won the Par 3 Contest in 1967 having won the Masters four times between 1958 and 1964.

Winner	Par 3 wins	Masters wins
Sam Snead	1960, 1974	1949, 1952, 1954
Art Wall Jr.	1965	1959
Arnold Palmer	1967	1958, 1960, 1962, 1964
Gay Brewer	1973	1967
Tom Watson	1982, 2018	1977, 1981
Tommy Aaron	1984	1973
Ben Crenshaw	1987	1984, 1995
Raymond Floyd	1990	1976
Vijay Singh	1994	2000
Sandy Lyle	1997, 1998	1988
Mark O'Meara	2007	1998
Mike Weir	2022	2003

- No player has won the Par 3 Contest and the Masters in the same year, a fact well known by the players.
  Raymond Floyd came the closest in the 1990 tournament, but lost in a sudden-death playoff.
- Ben Crenshaw and Vijay Singh are the only players to win a Masters after winning a Par 3 Contest.
- Tom Watson is the only player to hold both titles at once, for four days, winning the Par 3 Contest in 1982 as defending Masters champion.

== Notes ==
- ^{a} Par is a predetermined number of strokes that a golfer should require to complete a hole, a round (the sum of the total pars of the played holes), or a tournament (the sum of the total pars of each round). E stands for even, which means the round was completed in the predetermined number of strokes.
