= 1970 Masters Tournament =

- Front cover of the 1970 Masters Guide

Tournament information
- Dates: April 9–13, 1970
- Location: Augusta, Georgia; 33.503°N 82.020°W
- Course: Augusta National Golf Club
- Organized by: Augusta National Golf Club
- Tour: PGA Tour

Statistics
- Par: 72
- Length: 6,980 yards (6,383 m)
- Field: 83 players, 48 after cut
- Cut: 150 (+6)
- Winner's share: $25,000

Champion
- (United States) Billy Casper
- 279 (−9), playoff
- Location in the United States Location in Georgia

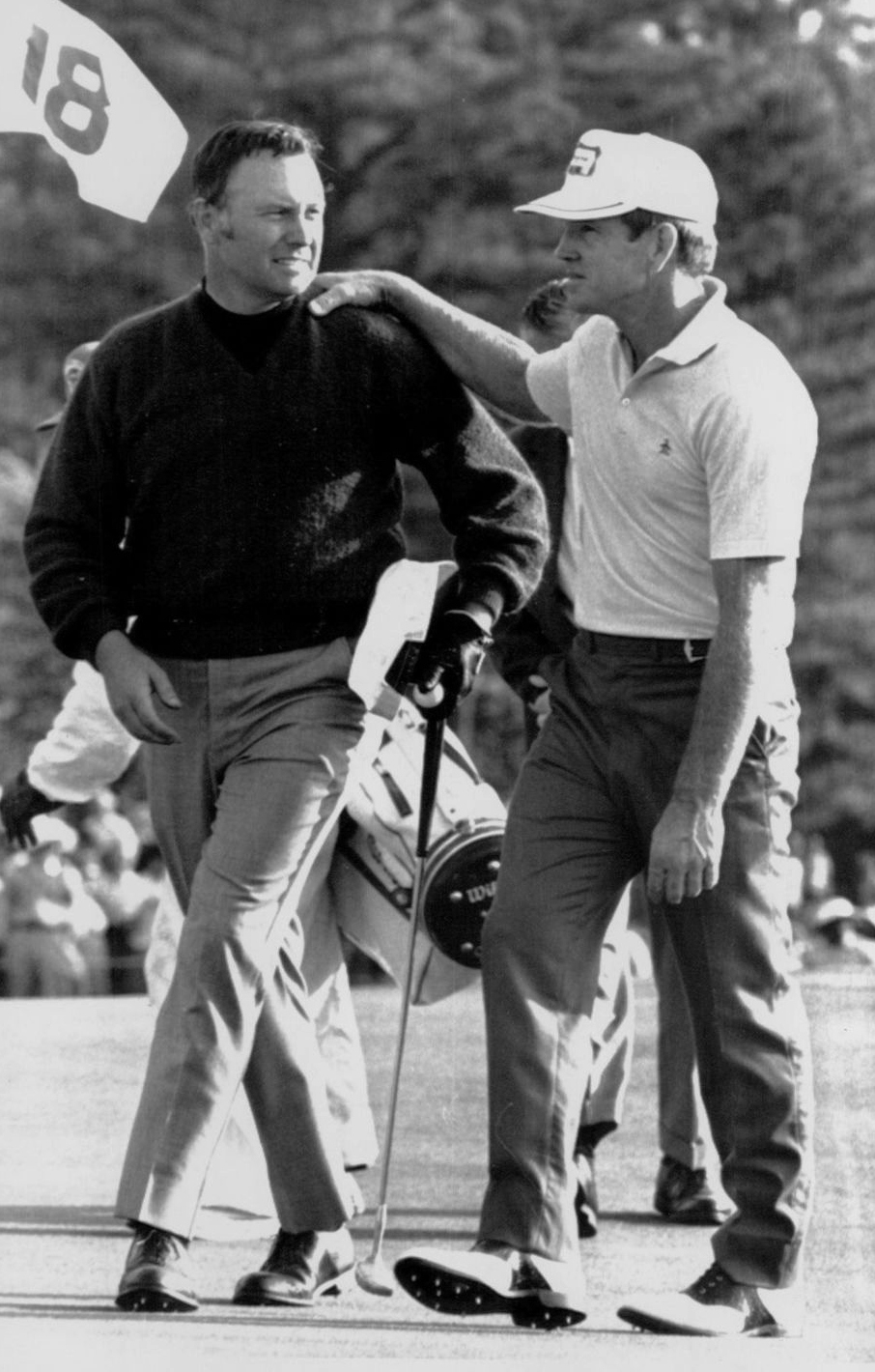
Billy Casper and Gene Littler at the 1970 Masters

The 1970 Masters Tournament was the 34th Masters Tournament, held April 9–13 at Augusta National Golf Club in Augusta, Georgia. A field of 83 players started the tournament and 48 made the 36-hole cut at 150 (+6).

Billy Casper defeated Gene Littler 69 to 74 in an 18-hole playoff on Monday to win his third major championship. It was the last 18-hole playoff at the Masters; the format was changed to sudden-death in 1976 and first used in 1979. To get into the playoff, Casper scored a final round of 71 (−1), while Littler shot a 70 to tie at 279 (−9).

Jack Nicklaus shot 69-69 on the weekend, but was hampered by a second round 75 and finished in 8th place. It was the final Masters tournament as a player for 1938 champion Henry Picard, who withdrew without finishing the first round. Three-time Masters champion Sam Snead finished in a tie for 23rd place at the age of 57. It was the Masters debut of two-time champion Tom Watson, then a 20-year-old amateur from Stanford who shot 77-76 and missed the cut by three strokes.

Harold Henning won the eleventh Par 3 Contest on Wednesday with a score of 21.

Dick Schaap's The Masters: The Winning of a Golf Classic covers in detail the 1970 tournament.

== Field ==
1. Masters champions

George Archer (8,9), Gay Brewer, Jack Burke Jr. (8), Doug Ford, Bob Goalby, Ralph Guldahl, Herman Keiser, Cary Middlecoff, Jack Nicklaus (2,3,8,11), Arnold Palmer (9), Henry Picard, Gary Player (2.3,10), Gene Sarazen, Sam Snead, Art Wall Jr.

- Jimmy Demaret, Ben Hogan, Claude Harmon, and Byron Nelson did not play.

The following categories only apply to Americans

2. U.S. Open champions (last five years)

Billy Casper (8,11), Orville Moody (9,10)

- Lee Trevino (8,11) did not play.

3. The Open champions (last five years)

4. PGA champions (last five years)

Julius Boros (9), Raymond Floyd (9,10,11), Al Geiberger (8,9), Don January (8), Dave Marr (9)

5. The first eight finishers in the 1969 U.S. Amateur

Charles Coe (a), Vinny Giles (7,a), John Farquhar (a), Steve Melnyk (6,7,a), Allen Miller (7,a), Ed Updegraff (7,a), Tom Watson (a), Bob Zender (a)

6. Previous two U.S. Amateur and Amateur champions

- Bruce Fleisher (7) forfeited his exemption by turning professional.

7. Members of the 1969 U.S. Walker Cup team

John Bohmann (a), Bill Hyndman (a), Joe Inman (a), Dick Siderowf (a), Lanny Wadkins (a)

8. Top 24 players and ties from the 1969 Masters Tournament

Tommy Aaron (11), Miller Barber (9,10,11), Frank Beard (11), Deane Beman (9), Charles Coody (9,10), Dale Douglass (9,11), Lionel Hebert, Dave Hill (9,11), Gene Littler (11), Mason Rudolph, Dan Sikes (11), Dave Stockton, Tom Weiskopf, Bert Yancey

9. Top 16 players and ties from the 1969 U.S. Open

Bunky Henry, Howie Johnson, Bob Murphy, Dean Refram, Phil Rodgers, Bob Rosburg, Kermit Zarley

10. Top eight players and ties from 1969 PGA Championship

Bert Greene, Terry Wilcox, Jimmy Wright, Larry Ziegler

11. Members of the U.S. 1969 Ryder Cup team

Ken Still

12. One player, either amateur or professional, not already qualified, selected by a ballot of ex-Masters champions.

Bob Lunn

13. Leading six players, not already qualified, from a points list based on finishes in PGA Tour events since the previous Masters

Homero Blancas, Larry Hinson, Grier Jones, Dick Lotz, Chi-Chi Rodríguez, R. H. Sikes

14. Foreign invitations

Maurice Bembridge, Roberto Bernardini, Michael Bonallack (6,a), Peter Butler, Bob Charles, Bruce Crampton (8,9), Roberto De Vicenzo (3), Bruce Devlin (8,9), Bernard Gallacher, Harold Henning (8), Hsieh Yung-yo, Tony Jacklin (3), George Knudson (8), Takaaki Kono (8), Sukree Onsham

- Numbers in brackets indicate categories that the player would have qualified under had they been American.

== Round summaries ==
=== First round ===
Thursday, April 9, 1970

Place	Player	Score	To par
1	(United States) Tommy Aaron	68	−4
T2	(United States) Gene Littler	69	−3
T2	(United States) Bert Yancey	69	−3
T4	(United States) Charles Coody	70	−2
T4	(United States) Bob Lunn	70	−2
T4	(United States) Chi-Chi Rodríguez	70	−2
T4	(United States) Dan Sikes	70	−2
T4	(United States) R. H. Sikes	70	−2
T9	(United States) Frank Beard	71	−1
T9	(United States) Jack Nicklaus	71	−1

=== Second round ===
Friday, April 10, 1970

Place	Player	Score	To par
T1	(United States) Gene Littler	69-70=139	−5
T1	(United States) Bert Yancey	69-70=139	−5
T3	(United States) Billy Casper	72-68=140	−4
T3	(United States) Bob Lunn	70-70=140	−4
T5	(United States) Tommy Aaron	68-74=142	−2
T5	(South Africa) Gary Player	74-68=142	−2
T7	(United States) Dave Hill	73-70=143	−1
T7	(Japan) Takaaki Kono	75-68=143	−1
T9	(United States) Charles Coody	70-74=144	E
T9	(United States) Larry Hinson	72-72=144	E
T9	(United States) Dave Stockton	72-72=144	E

=== Third round ===
Saturday, April 11, 1970

Place	Player	Score	To par
1	(United States) Billy Casper	72-68-68=208	−8
2	(United States) Gene Littler	69-70-70=209	−7
3	(South Africa) Gary Player	74-68-68=210	−6
T4	(United States) Tommy Aaron	68-74-69=211	−5
T4	(United States) Charles Coody	70-74-67=211	−5
T4	(United States) Bert Yancey	69-70-72=211	−5
T7	(United States) Dave Hill	73-70-70=213	−3
T7	(United States) Dave Stockton	72-72-69=213	−3
9	(Japan) Takaaki Kono	75-68-71=214	−2
T10	(United States) Frank Beard	71-76-68=215	−1
T10	(United States) Larry Hinson	72-72-71=215	−1
T10	(United States) Bob Lunn	70-70-75=215	−1
T10	(United States) Jack Nicklaus	71-75-69=215	−1

=== Final round ===
Sunday, April 12, 1970

==== Final leaderboard ====
Champion
Silver Cup winner (low amateur)
(a) = amateur
(c) = past champion

Top 10
Place	Player	Score	To par	Money (US$)
T1	(United States) Billy Casper	72-68-68-71=279	−9	Playoff
T1	(United States) Gene Littler	69-70-70-70=279	−9	Playoff
3	(South Africa) Gary Player (c)	74-68-68-70=280	−8	14,000
4	(United States) Bert Yancey	69-70-72-70=281	−7	10,000
T5	(United States) Tommy Aaron	68-74-69-72=283	−5	6,667
T5	(United States) Dave Hill	73-70-70-70=283	−5	6,667
T5	(United States) Dave Stockton	72-72-69-70=283	−5	6,667
8	(United States) Jack Nicklaus (c)	71-75-69-69=284	−4	4,500
9	(United States) Frank Beard	71-76-68-70=285	−3	4,000
T10	(United States) Bob Lunn	70-70-75-72=287	−1	3,500
T10	(United States) Chi-Chi Rodríguez	70-76-73-68=287	−1	3,500

Leaderboard below the top 10
Place	Player	Score	To par	Money ($)
T12	(United States) Charles Coody	70-74-67-77=288	E	3,000
T12	(United States) Bert Greene	75-71-70-72=288	E	3,000
T12	(England) Tony Jacklin	73-74-70-71=288	E	3,000
T12	(United States) Don January	76-73-69-70=288	E	3,000
T12	(Japan) Takaaki Kono	75-68-71-74=288	E	3,000
17	(New Zealand) Bob Charles	75-71-71-72=289	+1	2,700
T18	(United States) Howie Johnson	75-71-73-71=290	+2	2,500
T18	(United States) Dick Lotz	74-72-72-72=290	+2	2,500
T18	(United States) Orville Moody	73-72-71-74=290	+2	2,500
T21	(United States) Miller Barber	76-73-77-65=291	+3	2,250
T21	(United States) Terry Wilcox	79-70-70-72=291	+3	2,250
T23	(United States) Deane Beman	74-72-72-74=292	+4	2,020
T23	(United States) Julius Boros	75-71-74-72=292	+4	2,020
T23	(United States) Charles Coe (a)	74-71-72-75=292	+4	0
T23	(United States) Bob Murphy	78-70-73-71=292	+4	2,020
T23	(United States) Sam Snead (c)	76-73-71-72=292	+4	2,020
T23	(United States) Tom Weiskopf	73-73-72-74=292	+4	2,020
T29	(Chinese Taipei) Hsieh Yung-yo	75-75-69-74=293	+5	1,650
T29	(United States) Jimmy Wright	75-72-71-75=293	+5	1,650
T31	(United States) George Archer (c)	73-72-74-75=294	+6	1,650
T31	(United States) Gay Brewer (c)	78-70-72-74=294	+6	1,650
T31	(Australia) Bruce Devlin	72-74-78-70=294	+6	1,650
T31	(United States) Larry Hinson	72-72-71-79=294	+6	1,650
T31	(United States) Ken Still	74-73-74-73=294	+6	1,650
T36	(United States) Arnold Palmer (c)	75-73-74-73=295	+7	1,575
T36	(United States) Dan Sikes	70-77-71-77=295	+7	1,575
T38	(England) Maurice Bembridge	77-72-70-77=296	+8	1,575
T38	(Australia) Bruce Crampton	75-71-75-75=296	+8	1,575
T38	(United States) Dale Douglass	76-74-72-74=296	+8	1,575
T38	(United States) Vinny Giles (a)	78-72-72-74=296	+8	0
T38	(United States) Grier Jones	73-75-73-75=296	+8	1,575
43	(United States) Steve Melnyk (a)	73-76-71-77=297	+9	0
44	(United States) Bob Rosburg	77-73-75-73=298	+10	1,500
T45	(United States) Al Geiberger	73-77-74-75=299	+11	1,500
T45	(Canada) George Knudson	73-72-78-76=299	+11	1,500
47	(United States) R. H. Sikes	70-75-77-78=300	+12	1,500
48	(United States) Dean Refram	76-74-78-75=303	+15	1,500
CUT	(Argentina) Roberto De Vicenzo	78-73=151	+7	
CUT	(Scotland) Bernard Gallacher	77-74=151	+7	
CUT	(South Africa) Harold Henning	74-77=151	+7	
CUT	(United States) Bunky Henry	77-74=151	+7	
CUT	(United States) Dave Marr	75-76=151	+7	
CUT	(United States) Lanny Wadkins (a)	79-72=151	+7	
CUT	(United States) Raymond Floyd	76-76=152	+8	
CUT	(United States) Bill Hyndman (a)	76-76=152	+8	
CUT	(United States) Mason Rudolph	76-76=152	+8	
CUT	(United States) Ed Updegraff (a)	78-74=152	+8	
CUT	(United States) Art Wall Jr. (c)	76-76=152	+8	
CUT	(United States) Kermit Zarley	74-78=152	+8	
CUT	(United States) Lionel Hebert	75-78=153	+9	
CUT	(United States) Cary Middlecoff (c)	78-75=153	+9	
CUT	(United States) Tom Watson (a)	77-76=153	+9	
CUT	(England) Peter Butler	82-72=154	+10	
CUT	(United States) John Farquhar (a)	74-80=154	+10	
CUT	(United States) Larry Ziegler	76-78=154	+10	
CUT	(United States) Homero Blancas	81-74=155	+11	
CUT	(United States) Doug Ford (c)	76-79=155	+11	
CUT	(United States) Bob Goalby (c)	77-78=155	+11	
CUT	(United States) Gene Sarazen (c)	81-74=155	+11	
CUT	(United States) Bob Zender (a)	77-78=155	+11	
CUT	(United States) Joe Inman (a)	77-79=156	+12	
CUT	(United States) Dick Siderowf (a)	80-76=156	+12	
CUT	(United States) Allen Miller (a)	81-76=157	+13	
CUT	(United States) Phil Rodgers	78-79=157	+13	
CUT	(United States) Jack Burke Jr. (c)	78-80=158	+14	
CUT	(United States) Herman Keiser (c)	79-79=158	+14	
CUT	(United States) John Bohmann (a)	81-78=159	+15	
CUT	(Italy) Roberto Bernardini	80-80=160	+16	
CUT	(England) Michael Bonallack (a)	75-86=161	+17	
CUT	(Thailand) Sukree Onsham	78-84=162	+18	
CUT	(United States) Ralph Guldahl (c)	84-83=167	+23	
WD	(United States) Henry Picard (c)			

==== Scorecard ====
Hole	1	2	3	4	5	6	7	8	9	10	11	12	13	14	15	16	17	18
Par	4	5	4	3	4	3	4	5	4	4	4	3	5	4	5	3	4	4
(United States) Casper	−8	−8	−8	−9	−9	−9	−9	−7	−8	−8	−7	−7	−8	−8	−9	−9	−9	−9
(United States) Littler	−7	−7	−7	−7	−8	−8	−8	−9	−8	−8	−8	−8	−9	−9	−10	−9	−9	−9
(South Africa) Player	−6	−6	−6	−7	−6	−6	−6	−6	−7	−7	−7	−8	−9	−8	−8	−9	−9	−8
(United States) Yancey	−5	−6	−7	−7	−8	−8	−8	−8	−8	−8	−8	−8	−8	−8	−8	−8	−8	−7

Cumulative tournament scores, relative to par

Birdie	Bogey	Double bogey

=== Playoff ===
Monday, April 13, 1970

Place	Player	Score	To par	Money ($)
1	(United States) Billy Casper	69	−3	25,000
2	(United States) Gene Littler	74	+2	17,500

==== Scorecard ====
Hole	1	2	3	4	5	6	7	8	9	10	11	12	13	14	15	16	17	18
Par	4	5	4	3	4	3	4	5	4	4	4	3	5	4	5	3	4	4
(United States) Casper	−1	−1	−2	−2	−2	−2	−3	−3	−3	−2	−3	−2	−2	−1	−1	−2	−3	−3
(United States) Littler	E	+1	+1	+2	+2	+2	+2	+2	+2	+4	+4	+4	+3	+3	+2	+2	+3	+2
