= 1971 PGA Championship =

Coordinates: 26.832°N 80.117°W

Tournament information
- Dates: February 25–28, 1971
- Location: Palm Beach Gardens, Florida
- Courses: PGA National Golf Club, (now BallenIsles; Country Club, East Course)
- Organized by: PGA of America
- Tour: PGA Tour

Statistics
- Par: 72
- Length: 7,096 yards (6,489 m)
- Field: 144 players, 81 after cut
- Cut: 149 (+5)
- Prize fund: $202,440
- Winner's share: $40,000

Champion
- (United States) Jack Nicklaus
- 281 (−7)

Location in the United States
Location in Florida

The 1971 PGA Championship was the 53rd PGA Championship, played February 25–28 at the original PGA National Golf Club, presently known as BallenIsles Country Club (East Course) in Palm Beach Gardens, Florida.

Jack Nicklaus won the second of his five PGA Championships, two strokes ahead of Billy Casper, the reigning Masters champion. Nicklaus led wire-to-wire, and held a four-stroke lead over Gary Player after 54 holes, with Casper seven shots back. The two were pre-tournament favorites, along with Arnold Palmer, who shot an opening round 75 and finished at 289 (+1), eight strokes back.

Nicklaus became the first in history to complete the modern career Grand Slam for a second time; two victories in each of the four major championships. He completed his third career grand slam at the 1978 Open Championship.

The championship was played in February rather than August, due to anticipated oppressive summer weather in Florida. The rescheduling changed the PGA Championship from the fourth and final major of the calendar year to the first in 1971, and the 1970 and 1971 editions were consecutive majors. It returned to August in 1972 at Oakland Hills in Michigan.

== Round summaries ==
=== First round ===
Thursday, February 25, 1971

Place	Player	Score	To par
1	(United States) Jack Nicklaus	69	−3
T2	(New Zealand) Bob Charles	70	−2
T2	(United States) Bob Goalby	70	−2
T2	(United States) Bobby Mitchell	70	−2
T5	(United States) Bradley Anderson	71	−1
T5	(United States) Deane Beman	71	−1
T5	(United States) Julius Boros	71	−1
T5	(United States) Billy Casper	71	−1
T5	(Australia) Bruce Devlin	71	−1
T5	(United States) Larry Hinson	71	−1
T5	(United States) Johnny Miller	71	−1
T5	(South Africa) Gary Player	71	−1
T5	(United States) Sam Snead	71	−1
T5	(United States) Lee Trevino	71	−1
T5	(United States) Bert Yancey	71	−1

=== Second round ===
Friday, February 26, 1971

Place	Player	Score	To par
1	(United States) Jack Nicklaus	69-69=138	−6
2	(United States) Miller Barber	72-68=140	−4
3	(United States) Gibby Gilbert	74-67=141	−3
T4	(United States) Gene Borek	72-70=142	−2
T4	(Australia) Bruce Devlin	71-71=142	−2
T4	(United States) Lionel Hebert	72-70=142	−2
T4	(United States) Bob Lunn	72-70=142	−2
T4	(United States) Bob Murphy	74-68=142	−2
T4	(United States) Tom Weiskopf	72-70=142	−2
T4	(United States) Larry Ziegler	74-68=142	−2

=== Third round ===
Saturday, February 27, 1971

Place	Player	Score	To par
1	(United States) Jack Nicklaus	69-69-70=208	−8
2	(South Africa) Gary Player	71-73-68=212	−4
3	(United States) Gibby Gilbert	74-67-72=213	−3
T4	(United States) Miller Barber	72-68-75=215	−1
T4	(United States) Tommy Bolt	72-74-69=215	−1
T4	(United States) Gene Borek	72-70-73=215	−1
T4	(United States) Billy Casper	71-73-71=215	−1
T4	(New Zealand) Bob Charles	70-75-70=215	−1
T4	(United States) Bob Lunn	72-70-73=215	−1
T4	(United States) Bert Yancey	71-74-70=215	−1

=== Final leaderboard ===
Sunday, February 28, 1971

Place	Player	Score	To par	Money ($)
1	(United States) Jack Nicklaus	69-69-70-73=281	−7	40,000
2	(United States) Billy Casper	71-73-71-68=283	−5	22,800
3	(United States) Tommy Bolt	72-74-69-69=284	−4	14,200
T4	(United States) Miller Barber	72-68-75-70=285	−3	8,800
T4	(South Africa) Gary Player	71-73-68-73=285	−3	8,800
T6	(United States) Gibby Gilbert	74-67-72-73=286	−2	6,500
T6	(United States) Dave Hill	74-71-71-70=286	−2	6,500
T6	(United States) Jim Jamieson	72-72-72-70=286	−2	6,500
T9	(United States) Jerry Heard	73-71-72-71=287	−1	4,800
T9	(United States) Bob Lunn	72-70-73-72=287	−1	4,800
T9	(United States) Fred Marti	72-71-74-70=287	−1	4,800
T9	(United States) Bob Rosburg	74-72-70-71=287	−1	4,800
