= 1970 U.S. Open =

1970 U.S. Open may refer to:

- 1970 U.S. Open (golf), a major golf tournament
- 1970 US Open (tennis), a Grand Slam tennis tournament
