= Charles Coody =

American professional golfer (born 1937)

Personal information
- Full name: Billy Charles Coody
- Nationality: United States
- Born: July 13, 1937 (age 89) Stamford, Texas, U.S.
- Height: 6 ft 2 in (1.88 m)
- Weight: 185 lb (84 kg; 13.2 st)

Career
- Sport: Golf
- College: Abilene Christian University; Texas Christian University
- Turned professional: 1963
- Former tours: PGA Tour; Champions Tour
- Professional wins: 15

Number of wins by tour
- PGA Tour: 3
- European Tour: 2
- PGA Tour Champions: 5
- Other: 1 (regular); 4 (senior)

Best results in major championships (wins: 1)
- Masters Tournament: Won: 1971
- PGA Championship: 4th: 1977
- U.S. Open: T13: 1969
- The Open Championship: T5: 1971

Billy Charles Coody (/ˈku.di/ KOO-dee; born July 13, 1937) is an American professional golfer, best known for winning the 1971 Masters Tournament.

== Early life and amateur career ==
Coody was born in Stamford, Texas and raised in Abilene, Texas. He attended Abilene Christian University before transferring to and graduating in 1960 with a bachelor's degree in Business from Texas Christian University, where he was a member of Phi Delta Theta fraternity.

== Professional career ==
In 1963, Coody made his pro debut. He won two regular PGA Tour events early in his career and was known as one of the best iron players of his era. However, he was considered somewhat of an underachiever until his Masters victory. In the words of his contemporary Frank Beard, "Charlie's one of our better shotmakers but he tries hard not to win." Coody held the lead at the 1969 Masters Tournament with three holes left but finished bogey-bogey-bogey to tie for 5th place.

At the 1971 Masters Tournament, Coody opened with a three-shot lead. He remained in the lead entering the final round but was expected to lose to co-leader Jack Nicklaus who had won the 1971 PGA Championship two months earlier. The event turned into a 3-way battle between Coody, Nicklaus, and a young Johnny Miller who was playing his first Masters as a professional. Miller took control with birdies on #11, #12, and #14 to build a two shot lead. However, things began to unravel for Miller when he hit his approach into the bunker on the 15th and failed to make birdie. Miller's tee shot on the par-3 16th also found sand; the right bunker. This led to a bogey when Miller's par putt spun out. Coody, playing in the group behind Miller, went for the 15th green in two and ended up behind the same bunker Miller had just been in. Coody then chipped to 8 feet beyond the hole and made it coming back for birdie to reach 8-under. He next made another clutch birdie at the par-3 16th by striking his 6-iron to 13 feet and holing the putt to reach 9-under and take the lead alone. He made pars on the last two and won by two strokes. Nicklaus uncharacteristically played mediocre on Sunday. He had four three-putts for the round and shot 37 on the back nine without a birdie. He tied Miller for runner-up.

Coody had his share of success after his Masters victory. He represented the United States for the only time in the 1971 Ryder Cup. He finished 5th at the 1971 Open Championship – the only time he played in The Open. In later years, as expressed in an interview on the "ForeTheGoodOfTheGame" podcast, Coody mentioned regrets about playing The Open only one time and that he had made a mistake by not journeying overseas to compete in The Open more often. He later won two events on the fledgling European Tour in 1973 and also had chances to win additional majors at the 1976 PGA Championship and 1977 PGA Championship. In 1976, he held a two stroke lead entering the final round before collapsing with a 77. The following year, at Pebble Beach, he finished two strokes out of a playoff, shooting a 73 in the final round.

However, his Masters triumph did not serve as a catalyst for Coody to become one of the greats in the game. While he posted nine top-3 finishes through the 1970s and early 1980s, he never won on the PGA Tour again. One example of his "close calls" after his Masters win was the 1972 Hawaiian Open played at Waialae Country Club in early February. Coody fired rounds of 66-72-69-68 to finish at 13-under par 275 but finished a stroke out of a playoff. Coody played full-time on the PGA Tour until his late 40s.

When he turned 50, Coody played on the Senior PGA Tour with a decent amount of success, winning five times. Like most Masters winners, Coody played the Masters Tournament through his old age. He retired from active competition at the 2006 event having played 38 of the last 39 Masters.

== Personal life ==
Coody has a son Kyle, who was also a professional golfer in the 1980s and 1990s. He also has two daughters, Caryn Coody Hill and Kristyn Coody Aguero.

In 2022, his grandsons Pierceson and Parker turned professional and play on the PGA Tour.

== Awards and honors ==
- In 2000, Coody was inducted into the Texas Sports Hall of Fame .
- A college golf tournament, the Charles Coody West Texas Intercollegiate, is named after him.
- Coody lends his name to a charity event, the Charles Coody Classic, hosted by Texas Christian University.

== Professional wins (15) ==
=== PGA Tour wins (3) ===
Legend
Major championships (1)
Other PGA Tour (2)

No.	Date	Tournament	Winning score	Margin of victory	Runner(s)-up
1	Sep 7, 1964	Dallas Open Invitational	−13 (67-67-68-69=271)	1 stroke	(United States) Jerry Edwards
2	Jun 29, 1969	Cleveland Open Invitational	−9 (67-64-71-69=271)	2 strokes	(Australia) Bruce Crampton
3	Apr 11, 1971	Masters Tournament	−9 (66-73-70-70=279)	2 strokes	(United States) Johnny Miller, (United States) Jack Nicklaus

=== European Tour wins (2) ===
No.	Date	Tournament	Winning score	Margin of victory	Runner-up
1	Sep 8, 1973	W.D. & H.O. Wills Tournament	−7 (70-72-69-70=281)	1 stroke	(Australia) Jack Newton
2	Sep 29, 1973	John Player Classic	+5 (68-74-70-77=289)	3 strokes	(England) Tony Jacklin

=== Other wins (1) ===
- 1971 World Series of Golf

=== Senior PGA Tour wins (5) ===
No.	Date	Tournament	Winning score	Margin of victory	Runner(s)-up
1	Nov 12, 1989	General Tire Las Vegas Classic	−11 (67-69-69=205)	Playoff	(New Zealand) Bob Charles, (United States) Chi-Chi Rodríguez
2	Oct 7, 1990	Vantage Championship	−14 (67-65-70=202)	3 strokes	(New Zealand) Bob Charles, (United States) Al Geiberger
3	Jun 2, 1991	NYNEX Commemorative	−17 (66-62-65=193)	3 strokes	(United States) Don Massengale
4	Oct 20, 1991	Transamerica Senior Golf Championship	−12 (67-66-71=204)	2 strokes	(United States) Lee Trevino
5	Jun 16, 1996	du Maurier Champions	−9 (69-70-67-65=271)	1 stroke	(United States) Larry Mowry

Senior PGA Tour playoff record (1–0)

No.	Year	Tournament	Opponents	Result
1	1989	General Tire Las Vegas Classic	(New Zealand) Bob Charles, (United States) Chi-Chi Rodríguez	Won with birdie on second extra hole

=== Other senior wins (4) ===
- 1990 Liberty Mutual Legends of Golf (with Dale Douglass)
- 1994 Liberty Mutual Legends of Golf (with Dale Douglass)
- 1998 Liberty Mutual Legends of Golf (Legends Division with Dale Douglass)
- 1998 Liberty Mutual Legends of Golf (Legendary Division with Dale Douglass)

== Major championships ==
=== Wins (1) ===
Year	Championship	54 holes	Winning score	Margin	Runners-up
1971	Masters Tournament	Tied for lead	−9 (66-73-70-70=279)	2 strokes	(United States) Johnny Miller, (United States) Jack Nicklaus

=== Results timeline ===
Tournament	1960	1961	1962	1963	1964	1965	1966	1967	1968	1969
Masters Tournament				CUT			CUT		T30	T5
U.S. Open	CUT	CUT		CUT	CUT	CUT	T52	T28	T16	T13
The Open Championship										
PGA Championship						CUT			T8	T7

Tournament	1970	1971	1972	1973	1974	1975	1976	1977	1978	1979
Masters Tournament	T12	1	T12	T29	T29	T40	T5	CUT	CUT	T34
U.S. Open	T64	T63	CUT	T29	CUT	CUT	T38		T30	
The Open Championship		T5								
PGA Championship	T35	CUT	15	T35		CUT	T8	4	CUT	CUT

Tournament	1980	1981	1982	1983	1984	1985	1986	1987	1988	1989
Masters Tournament	T38	T40	CUT	T36	CUT	T44	CUT	CUT	CUT	T38
U.S. Open	T47									
The Open Championship										
PGA Championship	T41	74		T55						

Tournament	1990	1991	1992	1993	1994	1995	1996	1997	1998	1999
Masters Tournament	CUT	CUT		T57	CUT	CUT	CUT	CUT	CUT	CUT
U.S. Open										
The Open Championship										
PGA Championship										

Tournament	2000	2001	2002	2003	2004	2005	2006
Masters Tournament	CUT	CUT	CUT	CUT	CUT	CUT	CUT
U.S. Open							
The Open Championship							
PGA Championship							

Win
Top 10
Did not play

CUT = missed the halfway cut
"T" indicates a tie for a place.

=== Summary ===
Tournament	Wins	2nd	3rd	Top-5	Top-10	Top-25	Events	Cuts made
Masters Tournament	1	0	0	3	3	5	40	16
U.S. Open	0	0	0	0	0	2	18	10
The Open Championship	0	0	0	1	1	1	1	1
PGA Championship	0	0	0	1	4	5	15	10
Totals	1	0	0	5	8	13	74	37

- Most consecutive cuts made – 14 (1966 U.S. Open – 1971 Open Championship)
- Longest streak of top-10s – 2 (1968 PGA – 1969 Masters)

== U.S. national team appearances ==
Professional

- Ryder Cup: 1971 (winners)
