= 1969 Masters Tournament =

- Front cover of the 1969 Masters Guide

Tournament information
- Dates: April 10–13, 1969
- Location: Augusta, Georgia; 33.503°N 82.020°W
- Course: Augusta National Golf Club
- Organized by: Augusta National Golf Club
- Tour: PGA Tour

Statistics
- Par: 72
- Length: 6,980 yards (6,383 m)
- Field: 83 players, 48 after cut
- Cut: 148 (+4)
- Winner's share: $20,000

Champion
- (United States) George Archer
- 281 (−7)
- Location in the United States Location in Georgia

The 1969 Masters Tournament was the 33rd Masters Tournament, held April 10–13 at Augusta National Golf Club in Augusta, Georgia.

George Archer won his only major championship, one stroke ahead of runners-up Billy Casper, George Knudson, and Tom Weiskopf. Third round leader Casper was five over-par after ten holes in his final round, then regrouped with three birdies but needed another. Weiskopf was tied for the lead until a bogey at 17, and future champion Charles Coody bogeyed the final three holes and finished two strokes back. Casper would win the title in 1970 in a playoff and Coody would win in 1971.

This was the last Masters that Ken Venturi participated in, and he missed the cut by twelve strokes. As an amateur in 1956, Venturi led after 54 holes but finished runner-up to Jack Burke Jr. Burke made the cut at the Masters for the final time in 1969 and finished in 24th place. Past champions were noticeably absent from the leaderboard this year, as Burke tied for the best finish with three-time winner Jack Nicklaus.

It was Archer's third Masters and his only top ten finish at Augusta; his next best result was tied for eleventh in 1981.

Bob Lunn won the tenth Par 3 contest on Wednesday with a score of 23.

== Course ==
Hole	Name	Yards	Par	Hole	Name	Yards	Par
1	White Pine	400	4	10	Camellia	470	4
2	Woodbine	555	5	11	Dogwood	445	4
3	Flowering Peach	355	4	12	Golden Bell	155	3
4	Palm	220	3	13	Azalea	475	5
5	Magnolia	450	4	14	Chinese Fir	420	4
6	Juniper	190	3	15	Firethorn	520	5
7	Pampas	365	4	16	Redbud	190	3
8	Yellow Jasmine	530	5	17	Nandina	400	4
9	Carolina Cherry	420	4	18	Holly	420	4
Out		3,485	36	In		3,495	36
Source:				Total		6,980	72

^ Holes 1, 2, 4, and 11 were later renamed.

== Field ==
1. Masters champions

Gay Brewer (9,11), Jack Burke Jr., Doug Ford, Bob Goalby (8,10), Ralph Guldahl, Claude Harmon, Herman Keiser, Cary Middlecoff, Jack Nicklaus (2,3,8,9), Arnold Palmer (10,11), Henry Picard, Gary Player (2,3,8,9), Gene Sarazen, Sam Snead (9), Art Wall Jr. (8)

- Jimmy Demaret, Ben Hogan, and Byron Nelson did not play.

The following categories only apply to Americans

2. U.S. Open champions (last five years)

Billy Casper (8,9,10,11), Lee Trevino (9), Ken Venturi

3. The Open champions (last five years)

4. PGA champions (last five years)

Julius Boros (8,9,10,11), Al Geiberger (9,10,11), Don January (8), Dave Marr (8), Bobby Nichols (9,11)

5. The first eight finishers in the 1968 U.S. Amateur

Bob Barbarossa (a), John Bohmann (a), Bruce Fleisher (6,7,a), Vinny Giles (7,8,a), Hubert Green (a), Jack Lewis Jr. (7,a), Rik Massengale (a), Allen Miller (a)

- Miller and Billy Joe Patton tied for 8th place but Miller won the place by the drawing of lots. Canadian Gary Cowan also tied for 8th place but was not eligible.

6. Previous two U.S. Amateur and Amateur champions

- Bob Dickson forfeited his exemption by turning professional.

7. Members of the 1968 U.S. Eisenhower Trophy team

Dick Siderowf (a)

8. Top 24 players and ties from the 1968 Masters Tournament

Tommy Aaron, George Archer (9,10), Miller Barber (10), Frank Beard (10), Gardner Dickinson (11), Raymond Floyd, Lionel Hebert, Jerry Pittman (9), Mason Rudolph, Doug Sanders (10,11), Tom Weiskopf, Bert Yancey (9), Kermit Zarley (10)

9. Top 16 players and ties from the 1968 U.S. Open

Don Bies, Rod Funseth, Dave Hill, Steve Spray, Dave Stockton

10. Top eight players and ties from 1968 PGA Championship

Frank Boynton, Charles Coody, Marty Fleckman, Lou Graham, Dan Sikes

11. Members of the U.S. 1967 Ryder Cup team

Gene Littler, Johnny Pott

12. One player, either amateur or professional, not already qualified, selected by a ballot of ex-Masters champions.

Bob Murphy

13. Leading six players, not already qualified, from a points list based on finishes in PGA Tour events since the previous Masters

Deane Beman, Dale Douglass, Bob Lunn, Mac McLendon, R. H. Sikes, Ken Still

14. Foreign invitations

Roberto Bernardini, Michael Bonallack (6,a), Peter Butler, Joe Carr (a), Bob Charles (8,9,10), Bruce Crampton, Roberto De Vicenzo (3,8), Bruce Devlin (8,9), Harold Henning (8), Tommy Horton, Brian Huggett, Tony Jacklin (8), George Knudson, Takaaki Kono, Lu Liang-Huan, Ramón Sota, Peter Thomson (3), Peter Townsend, Raul Travieso

- Numbers in brackets indicate categories that the player would have qualified under had they been American.

== Round summaries ==
=== First round ===
Thursday, April 10, 1969

Place	Player	Score	To par
1	(United States) Billy Casper	66	−6
T2	(United States) George Archer	67	−5
T2	(Australia) Bruce Devlin	67	−5
4	(United States) Jack Nicklaus	68	−4
T5	(Australia) Bruce Crampton	69	−3
T5	(United States) Bruce Fleisher (a)	69	−3
T5	(United States) Lionel Hebert	69	−3
T5	(United States) Gene Littler	69	−3
T5	(United States) Mason Rudolph	69	−3
T5	(United States) Dan Sikes	69	−3
T5	(United States) Bert Yancey	69	−3

=== Second round ===
Friday, April 11, 1969

Place	Player	Score	To par
T1	(United States) Billy Casper	66-71=137	−7
T1	(Australia) Bruce Devlin	67-70=137	−7
T3	(United States) George Archer	67-73=140	−4
T3	(United States) Dan Sikes	69-71=140	−4
T5	(United States) Tommy Aaron	71-71=142	−2
T5	(United States) Miller Barber	71-71=142	−2
T5	(United States) Charles Coody	74-68=142	−2
T5	(Australia) Bruce Crampton	69-73=142	−2
T5	(United States) Al Geiberger	71-71=142	−2
T5	(United States) Lionel Hebert	69-73=142	−2
T5	(United States) Mason Rudolph	69-73=142	−2
T5	(United States) Dave Stockton	71-71=142	−2
T5	(United States) Tom Weiskopf	71-71=142	−2

=== Third round ===
Saturday, April 12, 1969

Despite being 2-over-par for his round Bruce Devlin was still in the thick of the chase at 5-under on Saturday until the Par-3 16th Hole where he rinsed his tee shot leading to a double-bogey 5 and leaving him five strokes behind starting the Final Round (where he further faded with a front nine of 6-over par 42 leading to a tie for 19th). Earlier in the round Devlin had made a great scrambling bogey at the difficult Par-4 11th after finding the water on his second shot, but could not repeat the magic when he found the water at 16.

Place	Player	Score	To par
1	(United States) Billy Casper	66-71-71=208	−8
2	(United States) George Archer	67-73-69=209	−7
3	(United States) Miller Barber	71-71-68=210	−6
T4	(United States) Charles Coody	74-68-69=211	−5
T4	(United States) Tom Weiskopf	71-71-69=211	−5
T6	(Canada) George Knudson	70-73-69=212	−4
T6	(United States) Lionel Hebert	69-73-70=212	−4
T8	(Australia) Bruce Devlin	67-70-76=213	−3
T8	(United States) Dan Sikes	69-71-73=213	−3
T10	(United States) Don Bies	74-70-70=214	−2
T10	(Japan) Takaaki Kono	71-75-68=214	−2
T10	(United States) Gene Littler	69-75-70=214	−2

=== Final round ===
Sunday, April 13, 1969

==== Summary ====
Billy Casper started the final round at 8-under par with a one-stroke lead over George Archer, but Casper bogeyed five of the first 10 holes. Meanwhile, Archer had gained a three-stroke lead at 8-under after 9 holes over George Knudson, Charles Coody and Tom Weiskopf (who was playing with Archer). As the back nine unfolded there was a lot of movement on the leaderboard and standing on the 18th tee, five of the last 6 players on the course had a chance to win the tournament outright or force a Monday playoff. Only Miller Barber, playing with Casper in the final group, was out of contention for the title. The final three groups ended up on the 18th hole at the same time: Casper (−6) and Barber (-3) waiting on the tee with Archer (−7) and Weiskopf (−6) looking on from the fairway while Coody (−6) was left of the green needing to chip in for a birdie to tie and Knudson (−6) on the green some 26 feet away also needing a tying birdie.

==== Final leaderboard ====
Champion
Silver Cup winner (low amateur)
(a) = amateur
(c) = past champion

Top 10
Place	Player	Score	To par	Money (US$)
1	(United States) George Archer	67-73-69-72=281	−7	20,000
T2	(United States) Billy Casper	66-71-71-74=282	−6	12,333
T2	(Canada) George Knudson	70-73-69-70=282	−6	12,333
T2	(United States) Tom Weiskopf	71-71-69-71=282	−6	12,333
T5	(United States) Charles Coody	74-68-69-72=283	−5	6,750
T5	(United States) Don January	74-73-70-66=283	−5	6,750
7	(United States) Miller Barber	71-71-68-74=284	−4	5,000
T8	(United States) Tommy Aaron	71-71-73-70=285	−3	3,600
T8	(United States) Lionel Hebert	69-73-70-73=285	−3	3,600
T8	(United States) Gene Littler	69-75-70-71=285	−3	3,600

Leaderboard below the top 10
Place	Player	Score	To par	Money ($)
11	(United States) Mason Rudolph	69-73-74-70=286	−2	3,200
12	(United States) Dan Sikes	69-71-73-74=287	−1	3,000
T13	(Australia) Bruce Crampton	69-73-74-72=288	E	2,700
T13	(United States) Al Geiberger	71-71-74-72=288	E	2,700
T13	(South Africa) Harold Henning	73-72-71-72=288	E	2,700
T13	(Japan) Takaaki Kono	71-75-68-74=288	E	2,700
T13	(United States) Bert Yancey	69-75-71-73=288	E	2,700
18	(United States) Dave Stockton	71-71-75-72=289	+1	2,400
T19	(United States) Frank Beard	72-74-70-74=290	+2	2,100
T19	(United States) Deane Beman	74-73-74-69=290	+2	2,100
T19	(Australia) Bruce Devlin	67-70-76-77=290	+2	2,100
T19	(United States) Dale Douglass	73-72-71-74=290	+2	2,100
T19	(United States) Lee Trevino	72-74-75-69=290	+2	2,100
T24	(United States) Jack Burke Jr. (c)	73-72-70-76=291	+3	1,800
T24	(United States) Dave Hill	75-73-72-71=291	+3	1,800
T24	(United States) Jack Nicklaus (c)	68-75-72-76=291	+3	1,800
27	(United States) Arnold Palmer (c)	73-75-70-74=292	+4	1,450
28	(United States) Johnny Pott	72-72-71-78=293	+5	1,450
T29	(Italy) Roberto Bernardini	76-71-72-75=294	+6	1,450
T29	(New Zealand) Bob Charles	70-76-72-76=294	+6	1,450
T29	(United States) Gardner Dickinson	73-74-71-76=294	+6	1,450
T29	(United States) Bobby Nichols	78-69-74-73=294	+6	1,450
T33	(United States) Don Bies	74-70-70-81=295	+7	1,425
T33	(United States) Julius Boros	72-73-73-77=295	+7	1,425
T33	(South Africa) Gary Player (c)	74-70-75-76=295	+7	1,425
T36	(United States) Raymond Floyd	73-71-78-74=296	+8	1,425
T36	(United States) Doug Sanders	72-71-76-77=296	+8	1,425
T36	(United States) Ken Still	73-75-71-77=296	+8	1,425
T36	(United States) Kermit Zarley	73-73-76-74=296	+8	1,425
T40	(United States) Bob Goalby (c)	70-76-76-75=297	+9	1,400
T40	(United States) Art Wall Jr. (c)	70-77-78-72=297	+9	1,400
42	(England) Peter Townsend	75-71-73-79=298	+10	1,400
43	(United States) Steve Spray	75-72-74-78=299	+11	1,400
44	(United States) Bruce Fleisher (a)	69-75-73-83=300	+12	0
45	(United States) Mac McLendon	72-75-76-80=303	+15	1,400
46	(United States) Dick Siderowf (a)	78-69-80-82=309	+21	0
CUT	(United States) Frank Boynton	76-73=149	+5	
CUT	(United States) Gay Brewer (c)	75-74=149	+5	
CUT	(United States) Marty Fleckman	73-76=149	+5	
CUT	(United States) Rod Funseth	73-76=149	+5	
CUT	(United States) Vinny Giles (a)	80-69=149	+5	
CUT	(England) Tony Jacklin	73-76=149	+5	
CUT	(United States) Bob Lunn	74-75=149	+5	
CUT	(United States) Jerry Pittman	74-75=149	+5	
CUT	(Argentina) Roberto De Vicenzo	75-75=150	+6	
CUT	(United States) Lou Graham	73-77=150	+6	
CUT	(Wales) Brian Huggett	78-72=150	+6	
CUT	(United States) Bob Murphy	71-79=150	+6	
CUT	(United States) R. H. Sikes	75-75=150	+6	
CUT	(United States) Rik Massengale (a)	75-76=151	+7	
CUT	(United States) Allen Miller (a)	77-74=151	+7	
CUT	(United States) Henry Picard (c)	75-76=151	+7	
CUT	(United States) Sam Snead (c)	74-77=151	+7	
CUT	(England) Tommy Horton	74-78=152	+8	
CUT	(Argentina) Raul Travieso	76-76=152	+8	
CUT	(United States) Hubert Green (a)	76-77=153	+9	
CUT	(United States) Jack Lewis Jr. (a)	75-78=153	+9	
CUT	(United States) Dave Marr	77-76=153	+9	
CUT	(Australia) Peter Thomson	78-75=153	+9	
CUT	(United States) Bob Barbarossa (a)	75-79=154	+10	
CUT	(United States) Doug Ford (c)	73-81=154	+10	
CUT	(Spain) Ramón Sota	75-79=154	+10	
CUT	(England) Michael Bonallack (a)	76-79=155	+11	
CUT	(England) Peter Butler	77-78=155	+11	
CUT	(Republic of Ireland) Joe Carr (a)	79-76=155	+11	
CUT	(Chinese Taipei) Lu Liang-Huan	80-76=156	+12	
CUT	(United States) Gene Sarazen (c)	78-80=158	+14	
CUT	(United States) John Bohmann (a)	77-82=159	+15	
CUT	(United States) Ralph Guldahl (c)	77-83=160	+16	
CUT	(United States) Ken Venturi	83-77=160	+16	
WD	(United States) Herman Keiser (c)	71-77-80=228	+12	
WD	(United States) Cary Middlecoff (c)	72-76-80=228	+12	
WD	(United States) Claude Harmon (c)	83	+11	

==== Scorecard ====
Hole	1	2	3	4	5	6	7	8	9	10	11	12	13	14	15	16	17	18
Par	4	5	4	3	4	3	4	5	4	4	4	3	5	4	5	3	4	4
(United States) Archer	−7	−8	−8	−7	−7	−7	−8	−8	−8	−7	−7	−7	−8	−7	−7	−7	−7	−7
(United States) Casper	−8	−8	−8	−7	−7	−6	−5	−5	−4	−3	−4	−4	−5	−5	−6	−6	−6	−6
(Canada) Knudson	−5	−5	−5	−5	−5	−5	−5	−5	−5	−4	−4	−4	−4	−4	−5	−6	−6	−6
(United States) Weiskopf	−5	−6	−5	−5	−4	−4	−4	−5	−5	−5	−5	−5	−6	−6	−7	−7	−6	−6
(United States) Coody	−5	−5	−5	−5	−5	−5	−5	−5	−5	−5	−6	−6	−8	−7	−8	−7	−6	−5
(United States) January	+2	+1	+1	E	E	E	−1	−2	−2	−2	−2	−2	−3	−3	−4	−4	−4	−5
(United States) Barber	−5	−5	−4	−4	−4	−4	−2	−3	−3	−4	−4	−4	−3	−4	−3	−3	−3	−4

Cumulative tournament scores, relative to par
