= 1971 PGA Tour =

Golf tour season

1971 PGA Tour season
- Duration: January 7, 1971 – December 12, 1971
- Number of official events: 44
- Most wins: (United States) Lee Trevino (6)
- Money list: (United States) Jack Nicklaus
- PGA Player of the Year: (United States) Lee Trevino

The 1971 PGA Tour was the 56th season of the PGA Tour, the main professional golf tour in the United States. It was also the third season since separating from the PGA of America.

== Dave Hill antitrust lawsuit ==
At the Colonial National Invitation, Dave Hill shot rounds of 77-85 to miss the cut. On his last hole, Hill threw a ball out of a sand trap. Hill was disqualified but it was for his signing a scorecard with an incorrect score on it. When Hill went to play in his next tournament, the Danny Thomas Memphis Classic, Hill was informed that he was being fined $500 for conduct unbecoming a professional golfer. Hill was required to pay the fine before teeing it up in the tournament. He did so, but less than a week later, Hill filed a one-million dollar antitrust suit against the PGA Tour. In response, the tour put Hill on probation for one year.

== Schedule ==
The following table lists official events during the 1971 season.

Date	Tournament	Location	Purse (US$)	Winner(s) (Note: The number in parentheses after each winner's name is the number of PGA Tour events they had won up to and including that tournament. This information is only shown for PGA Tour members.)	Notes
Jan 10	Glen Campbell-Los Angeles Open	California	110,000	(United States) Bob Lunn (5)	
Jan 17	Bing Crosby National Pro-Am	California	135,000	(United States) Tom Shaw (3)	Pro-Am
Jan 24	Phoenix Open Invitational	Arizona	125,000	(United States) Miller Barber (6)	
Jan 31	Andy Williams-San Diego Open Invitational	California	150,000	(United States) George Archer (7)	
Feb 7	Hawaiian Open	Hawaii	200,000	(United States) Tom Shaw (4)	
Apr 11	United Air Lines – Ontario Open	California	25,000	(United States) Fred Marti (n/a)	Second Tour (Note: Official money; unofficial win.)
Feb 14	Bob Hope Desert Classic	California	140,000	(United States) Arnold Palmer (58)	Pro-Am
Feb 22	Tucson Open Invitational	Arizona	110,000	(United States) J. C. Snead (1)	
Feb 28	PGA Championship	Florida	200,000	(United States) Jack Nicklaus (34)	Major championship
Mar 7	Doral-Eastern Open Invitational	Florida	150,000	(United States) J. C. Snead (2)	
Mar 14	Florida Citrus Invitational	Florida	150,000	(United States) Arnold Palmer (59)	
Mar 21	Greater Jacksonville Open	Florida	125,000	(South Africa) Gary Player (14)	
Mar 28	National Airlines Open Invitational	Florida	200,000	(South Africa) Gary Player (15)	
Apr 4	Greater Greensboro Open	North Carolina	190,000	(United States) Buddy Allin (1)	
Apr 11	Masters Tournament	Georgia	125,000	(United States) Charles Coody (3)	Major championship
Apr 11	Magnolia Classic	Mississippi	35,000	(United States) Roy Pace (n/a)	Second Tour
Apr 18	Monsanto Open	Florida	150,000	(United States) Gene Littler (23)	
Apr 25	Tournament of Champions	California	165,000	(United States) Jack Nicklaus (35)	Winners-only event
Apr 25	Tallahassee Open Invitational	Florida	60,000	(United States) Lee Trevino (6)	Alternate event
May 2	Greater New Orleans Open Invitational	Louisiana	125,000	(United States) Frank Beard (11)	
May 9	Byron Nelson Golf Classic	Texas	125,000	(United States) Jack Nicklaus (36)	
May 16	Houston Champions International	Texas	125,000	(United States) Hubert Green (1)	
May 16	East Ridge Classic	Louisiana	25,000	(United States) Wilf Homenuik (n/a)	Second Tour
May 23	Colonial National Invitation	Texas	125,000	(United States) Gene Littler (24)	Invitational
May 23	Maumelle Open	Arkansas	25,000	(United States) Tom Ulozas (n/a)	Second Tour
May 30	Danny Thomas Memphis Classic	Tennessee	175,000	(United States) Lee Trevino (7)	
Jun 6	Atlanta Classic	Georgia	125,000	(United States) Gardner Dickinson (7)	
Jun 13	Kemper Open	North Carolina	150,000	(United States) Tom Weiskopf (3)	
Jun 13	Kemper–Asheville Open Invitational	North Carolina	25,000	(United States) Charles Owens (n/a)	Second Tour
Jun 21	U.S. Open	Pennsylvania	190,000	(United States) Lee Trevino (8)	Major championship
Jun 27	Cleveland Open	Ohio	150,000	(United States) Bobby Mitchell (1)	
Jul 4	Canadian Open	Canada	150,000	(United States) Lee Trevino (9)	
Jul 10	The Open Championship	England	£45,000	(United States) Lee Trevino (10)	Major championship (Note: Unofficial money event at the time, but retrospectively counted as an official win.)
Jul 11	Greater Milwaukee Open	Wisconsin	125,000	(United States) Dave Eichelberger (1)	
Jul 18	Western Open	Illinois	150,000	(Australia) Bruce Crampton (9)	
Jul 25	Westchester Classic	New York	250,000	(United States) Arnold Palmer (60)	
Aug 2	National Team Championship	Pennsylvania	200,000	(United States) Jack Nicklaus (37) and (United States) Arnold Palmer (61)	Team event
Aug 8	American Golf Classic	Ohio	150,000	(United States) Jerry Heard (1)	
Aug 15	Massachusetts Classic	Massachusetts	165,000	(United States) Dave Stockton (5)	
Aug 22	IVB-Philadelphia Golf Classic	Pennsylvania	150,000	(United States) Tom Weiskopf (4)	
Aug 29	Liggett & Myers Open Match Play Championship	North Carolina	175,000	(United States) DeWitt Weaver (1)	New tournament Limited-field event
Sep 6	Greater Hartford Open Invitational	Connecticut	110,000	(United States) George Archer (8)	
Sep 12	Southern Open Invitational	Georgia	100,000	(United States) Johnny Miller (1)	
Sep 19	Quad Cities Open Invitational	Iowa	25,000	(United States) Deane Beman (n/a)	New tournament Second Tour
Sep 26	Robinson Open Golf Classic	Illinois	100,000	(United States) Labron Harris Jr. (1)	
Oct 24	Kaiser International Open Invitational	California	150,000	(United States) Billy Casper (48)	
Oct 31	Sahara Invitational	Nevada	135,000	(United States) Lee Trevino (11)	
Nov 21	Azalea Open Invitational	North Carolina	35,000	(United States) George Johnson (n/a)	Second Tour
Nov 27	Sea Pines Open Invitational	South Carolina	30,000	(United States) Charlie Sifford (n/a)	Second Tour
Nov 28	Sea Pines Heritage Classic	South Carolina	110,000	(United States) Hale Irwin (1)	Invitational
Dec 6	Walt Disney World Open Invitational	Florida	150,000	(United States) Jack Nicklaus (38)	New tournament
Dec 12	Bahamas National Open	Bahamas	130,000	(United States) Bob Goalby (11)	

=== Unofficial events ===
The following events were sanctioned by the PGA Tour, but did not carry official money, nor were wins official.

Date	Tournament	Location	Purse ($)	Winner(s)	Notes
Sep 18	Ryder Cup	Missouri	n/a	Team USA	Team event
Nov 14	World Cup	Florida	6,300	(United States) Jack Nicklaus and (United States) Lee Trevino	Team event
Nov 14	World Cup Individual Trophy	Florida	6,300	(United States) Jack Nicklaus	

== Money list ==
The money list was based on prize money won during the season, calculated in U.S. dollars.

Position	Player	Prize money ($)
1	(United States) Jack Nicklaus	244,491
2	(United States) Lee Trevino	231,202
3	(United States) Arnold Palmer	209,604
4	(United States) George Archer	147,769
5	(South Africa) Gary Player	120,917
6	(United States) Miller Barber	117,359
7	(United States) Jerry Heard	112,389
8	(United States) Frank Beard	112,338
9	(United States) Dave Eichelberger	108,312
10	(United States) Billy Casper	107,276

== Awards ==
Award	Winner	Ref.
PGA Player of the Year	(United States) Lee Trevino	
Scoring leader (Vardon Trophy)	(United States) Lee Trevino	
