= 1969 PGA Tour =

Golf tour season

1969 PGA Tour season
- Duration: January 9, 1969 – December 7, 1969
- Number of official events: 49
- Most wins: (United States) Billy Casper (3) (United States) Raymond Floyd (3) (United States) Dave Hill (3) (United States) Jack Nicklaus (3)
- Money list: (United States) Frank Beard
- PGA Player of the Year: (United States) Orville Moody

The 1969 PGA Tour was the 54th season of the PGA Tour, the main professional golf tour in the United States. It was also the first season since separating from the PGA of America.

== PGA of America separation ==
The 1969 season is generally regarded as the first season of an independent PGA Tour. The tour began to break off from the PGA of America in August 1968. The players formed a Tournament Players Division within the PGA of America, "a freestanding corporation run by a 10-member tournament policy board of four players, three PGA executives and three consulting businessmen."

== Schedule ==
The following table lists official events during the 1969 season.

Date	Tournament	Location	Purse (US$)	Winner (Note: The number in parentheses after each winner's name is the number of PGA Tour events they had won up to and including that tournament. This information is only shown for PGA Tour members.)	Notes
Jan 12	Los Angeles Open	California	100,000	(United States) Charlie Sifford (2)	
Jan 12	Alameda County Open	California	50,000	(United States) Dick Lotz (1)	New tournament Alternate event
Jan 20	Kaiser International Open Invitational	California	67,500	(United States) Miller Barber (4)	
Jan 27	Bing Crosby National Pro-Am	California	125,000	(United States) George Archer (6)	Pro-Am
Feb 2	Andy Williams-San Diego Open Invitational	California	150,000	(United States) Jack Nicklaus (28)	
Feb 9	Bob Hope Desert Classic	California	100,000	(United States) Billy Casper (41)	Pro-Am
Feb 16	Phoenix Open Invitational	Arizona	100,000	(United States) Gene Littler (21)	
Feb 23	Tucson Open Invitational	Arizona	100,000	(United States) Lee Trevino (3)	
Mar 2	Doral Open Invitational	Florida	150,000	(United States) Tom Shaw (1)	
Mar 9	Florida Citrus Open Invitational	Florida	115,000	(United States) Ken Still (1)	
Mar 18	Monsanto Open Invitational	Florida	100,000	(United States) Jim Colbert (1)	
Mar 23	Greater Jacksonville Open	Florida	100,000	(United States) Raymond Floyd (3)	
Mar 30	National Airlines Open Invitational	Florida	200,000	(United States) Bunky Henry (1)	New tournament
Apr 6	Greater Greensboro Open	North Carolina	160,000	(United States) Gene Littler (22)	
Apr 13	Masters Tournament	Georgia	100,000	(United States) George Archer (7)	Major championship
Apr 14	Magnolia Classic	Mississippi	20,000	(United States) Larry Mowry (n/a)	Second Tour (Note: Official money; unofficial win.)
Apr 20	Tournament of Champions	California	150,000	(South Africa) Gary Player (12)	Winners-only event
Apr 20	Azalea Open Invitational	North Carolina	25,000	(United States) Dale Douglass (1)	Alternate event
Apr 20	Tallahassee Open Invitational	Florida	25,000	(United States) Chuck Courtney (2)	New tournament Alternate event
Apr 27	Byron Nelson Golf Classic	Texas	100,000	(Australia) Bruce Devlin (4)	
May 4	Greater New Orleans Open Invitational	Louisiana	100,000	(United States) Larry Hinson (1)	
May 11	Texas Open Invitational	Texas	100,000	(United States) Deane Beman (1)	
May 18	Colonial National Invitation	Texas	125,000	(United States) Gardner Dickinson (6)	Invitational
May 25	Atlanta Classic	Georgia	115,000	(United States) Bert Yancey (5)	
Jun 1	Memphis Open Invitational	Tennessee	150,000	(United States) Dave Hill (5)	
Jun 8	Western Open	Illinois	130,000	(United States) Billy Casper (42)	
Jun 15	U.S. Open	Texas	205,000	(United States) Orville Moody (1)	Major championship
Jun 22	Kemper Open	North Carolina	150,000	(United States) Dale Douglass (2)	
Jun 29	Cleveland Open Invitational	Ohio	110,000	(United States) Charles Coody (2)	
Jul 6	Buick Open Invitational	Michigan	125,000	(United States) Dave Hill (6)	
Jul 12	The Open Championship	England	£30,000	(England) Tony Jacklin (2)	Major championship (Note: Unofficial money event at the time, but retrospectively counted as an official win.)
Jul 13	Minnesota Golf Classic	Minnesota	100,000	(United States) Frank Beard (7)	Alternate event
Jul 20	IVB-Philadelphia Golf Classic	Pennsylvania	150,000	(United States) Dave Hill (7)	
Jul 27	American Golf Classic	Ohio	125,000	(United States) Raymond Floyd (4)	
Aug 3	Westchester Classic	New York	250,000	(United States) Frank Beard (8)	
Aug 10	Greater Milwaukee Open	Wisconsin	100,000	(United States) Ken Still (2)	
Aug 17	PGA Championship	Ohio	175,000	(United States) Raymond Floyd (5)	Major championship
Aug 17	Indian Ridge Hospital Open Invitational	Massachusetts	37,000	(United States) Monty Kaser (1)	New tournament Alternate event
Aug 24	AVCO Golf Classic	Massachusetts	150,000	(United States) Tom Shaw (2)	New tournament
Sep 2	Greater Hartford Open Invitational	Connecticut	100,000	(United States) Bob Lunn (3)	
Sep 7	Michigan Golf Classic	Michigan	100,000	(United States) Larry Ziegler (1)	New tournament
Sep 28	Alcan Open	Oregon	275,000	(United States) Billy Casper (43)	New to PGA Tour
Sep 28	Robinson Open Golf Classic	Illinois	75,000	(United States) Bob Goalby (9)	Alternate event
Oct 19	Sahara Invitational	Nevada	100,000	(United States) Jack Nicklaus (29)	
Oct 26	San Francisco Open Invitational	California	100,000	(United States) Steve Spray (1)	
Nov 3	Kaiser International Open Invitational	California	140,000	(United States) Jack Nicklaus (30)	
Nov 9	Hawaiian Open	Hawaii	125,000	(Australia) Bruce Crampton (7)	
Nov 30	Heritage Golf Classic	South Carolina	100,000	(United States) Arnold Palmer (55)	New tournament Invitational
Dec 7	Danny Thomas-Diplomat Classic	Florida	125,000	(United States) Arnold Palmer (56)	New tournament
Dec 7	West End Classic	Bahamas	25,000	(United States) Jim Wiechers (1)	Alternate event

=== Unofficial events ===
The following events were sanctioned by the PGA Tour, but did not carry official money, nor were wins official.

Date	Tournament	Location	Purse ($)	Winner(s)	Notes
Sep 20	Ryder Cup	England	n/a	Tie ( Team USA retain)	Team event
Oct 5	World Cup	Singapore	6,300	(United States) Orville Moody and (United States) Lee Trevino	Team event
Oct 5	World Cup Individual Trophy	Singapore	6,300	(United States) Lee Trevino	

== Money list ==
The money list was based on prize money won during the season, calculated in U.S. dollars.

Position	Player	Prize money ($)
1	(United States) Frank Beard	175,223
2	(United States) Dave Hill	156,432
3	(United States) Jack Nicklaus	140,167
4	(South Africa) Gary Player	123,897
5	(Australia) Bruce Crampton	118,955
6	(United States) Gene Littler	112,737
7	(United States) Lee Trevino	112,417
8	(United States) Raymond Floyd	109,956
9	(United States) Arnold Palmer	105,128
10	(United States) Billy Casper	104,689

== Awards ==
Award	Winner	Ref.
PGA Player of the Year	(United States) Orville Moody	
Scoring leader (Vardon Trophy)	(United States) Dave Hill	
