= 1972 Piccadilly World Match Play Championship =

Coordinates: 51°23′48″N 0°35′45″W

Tournament information
- Dates: 12–14 October 1972
- Location: Virginia Water, Surrey, England
- Course(s): West Course, Wentworth
- Format: Match play – 36 holes

Statistics
- Par: 74
- Length: 6,997 yards (6,398 m)
- Field: 8 players
- Prize fund: £25,000
- Winner's share: £8,500

Champion
- (United States) Tom Weiskopf
- def. Lee Trevino 4 & 3

The 1972 Piccadilly World Match Play Championship was the ninth World Match Play Championship. It was played from Thursday 12 to Saturday 14 October on the West Course at Wentworth. Eight players competed in a straight knock-out competition, with each match contested over 36 holes. The champion received £8,500 out of a total prize fund of £25,000. In the final, Tom Weiskopf beat Lee Trevino 4 & 3 to win the championship.

Grier Jones was a surprise invitee for the event. Relatively unknown in Europe, he had won two events on the 1972 PGA Tour and runner-up in two others. He met Tony Jacklin in the first round and lost 7 & 6.

Peter Oosterhuis beat defending champion Gary Player in the first round. Oosterhuis won four of the first five holes and went 5 up after an eagle at the 12th. Player won three of the remaining holes to go to lunch only two holes down and had levelled the match by the 13th hole of the afternoon round. Oosterhuis holed a 30-foot putt at the 16th and eventually won by one hole.

== Course ==
Hole	1	2	3	4	5	6	7	8	9	Out	10	11	12	13	14	15	16	17	18	In	Total
Yards	476	157	457	497	192	347	403	400	460	3,389	190	408	480	437	183	480	380	555	495	3,608	6,997
Par	5	3	4	5	3	4	4	4	4	36	3	4	5	4	3	5	4	5	5	38	74

== Scores ==
Quarter-finals; 12 October
(South Africa) Gary Player
(England) Peter Oosterhuis	1 up
(Australia) David Graham
(United States) Tom Weiskopf	3 & 2
(United States) Lee Trevino	2 & 1
(United States) Doug Sanders
(England) Tony Jacklin	7 & 6
(United States) Grier Jones

Semi-finals; 13 October
(England) Peter Oosterhuis
(United States) Tom Weiskopf	4 & 3
(United States) Lee Trevino	1 up
(England) Tony Jacklin

Final; 14 October
(United States) Tom Weiskopf	4 & 3
(United States) Lee Trevino

== Prize money ==
The winner received £8,500, the runner-up £4,500, the losing semi-finalists £3,000 and the first round losers £1,500, making a total prize fund of £25,000.
