= Frank Sinatra Open Invitational =

PGA Tour golf tournament

Tournament information
- Location: Palm Springs, California
- Established: 1963
- Course: Canyon Club
- Par: 70
- Tour: PGA Tour
- Format: Stroke play
- Prize fund: US$50,000
- Month played: November
- Final year: 1963

Tournament record score
- Aggregate: 278 Frank Beard (1963)
- To par: −6 as above

Final champion
- (United States) Frank Beard
- Location in the United States Location in California

The Frank Sinatra Open Invitational was a PGA Tour event that was played at the Canyon Club in Palm Springs, California. It was played for only a single year—1963—although it was intended to be an annual affair. The five-day event was designed to allow the heavyweights in golf and show business to come together and pay tribute to the icon who meant so much to both industries. The four-day golf tournament was followed by a black-tie gala in the ballroom of the Palm Springs Riviera Hotel.

The tournament was won by a then 24-year-old in his second year on Tour, Frank Beard, after having to Monday qualify. It was Beard's first win at an official PGA Tour event. First place prize money was $9,000, which was in the upper echelon for winner's earnings in 1963.

== Winner ==
Year	Winner	Score	To par	Margin of victory	Runner-up
1963	(United States) Frank Beard	278	−6	1 stroke	(United States) Jerry Steelsmith
