= Fred Marti =

American professional golfer (born 1940)

Personal information
- Full name: Fred Walter Marti
- Nationality: United States
- Born: November 15, 1940 (age 85) Baytown, Texas, U.S.
- Height: 6 ft 2 in (1.88 m)
- Weight: 200 lb (91 kg; 14 st)

Career
- Sport: Golf
- College: University of Houston
- Turned professional: 1964
- Former tour: PGA Tour
- Professional wins: 2

Best results in major championships
- Masters Tournament: DNP
- PGA Championship: T9: 1971
- U.S. Open: T54: 1970
- The Open Championship: DNP

Fred Walter Marti (born November 15, 1940) is an American professional golfer.

== Early life and amateur career ==
Marti was born in Baytown, Texas. He played college golf at the University of Houston with Homero Blancas, Dick Crawford, Babe Hiskey, Rocky Thompson, and Kermit Zarley. He was a member of the 1962 team that went undefeated and won the NCAA Division I Championship.

== Professional career ==
In 1964, Marti turned professional. He played the PGA Tour from 1964 to 1980. His best finishes were a trio of second places: 2nd at the 1971 Kaiser International Open Invitational, 2nd at the 1972 Colonial National Invitation, and 2nd at the 1978 Ed McMahon-Jaycees Quad Cities Open. His best finish in a major was a T-9 at the 1971 PGA Championship.

After retiring from the PGA Tour in 1980, Marti replaced Homero Blancas as the head golf professional at Silverbell Golf Course in Tucson, Arizona. He was recognized by the Southwest Section of the PGA as Teacher of the Year in 1989. In 1996, Marti returned to his hometown of Baytown, Texas after accepting the head professional position at Evergreen Point Golf Course. Though retired, he continues to coach PGA Tour player Shawn Stefani.

== Professional wins ==
this list may be incomplete

- 1971 United Air Lines-Ontario Open (unofficial PGA Tour event)
- 1981 Arizona Open
