= 1970 U.S. Open (golf) =

Coordinates: 44.834°N 93.591°W

Tournament information
- Dates: June 18–21, 1970
- Location: Chaska, Minnesota
- Course: Hazeltine National Golf Club
- Organized by: USGA
- Tour: PGA Tour

Statistics
- Par: 72
- Length: 7,151 yards (6,539 m)
- Field: 150 players, 73 after cut
- Cut: 153 (+9)
- Prize fund: $195,700
- Winner's share: $30,000

Champion
- (England) Tony Jacklin
- 281 (−7)

Location in the United States
Location in Minnesota

The 1970 U.S. Open was the 70th U.S. Open, held June 18–21 at Hazeltine National Golf Club in Chaska, Minnesota, a suburb southwest of Minneapolis. Tony Jacklin shot under-par in all four rounds on his way to a seven-stroke victory and his only U.S. Open title, the second of his two major championships. He was the first champion born in England since Cyril Walker in 1924.

Jacklin led wire-to-wire and was hardly threatened throughout the championship.

The first round was played in extremely challenging conditions with winds blustering up to 41 miles an hour and resulted in generally high scoring with only 7 players in the field breaking 75. Arnold Palmer shot 79, Gary Player 80, and Jack Nicklaus 81. In contrast Jacklin thrived in the conditions and returned a 71 saying the wind blew harder in England and "the more it blows, the better I like it."

Jacklin took a four-shot lead over Dave Hill into the final round, and despite bogeys at the 7th and 8th, made a long birdie putt at 9 to quell any talk of a collapse. Jacklin shot a third consecutive round of 70 and a 281 total, seven clear of the field and the only player under par.

The final round was broadcast by ABC. The existing footage includes commentary from Byron Nelson, Dave Marr and Henry Longhurst.

Opened eight years earlier, Hazeltine was hosting its first men's major championship, and reviews were mixed. Runner-up Hill, when asked what the course lacked, said: "Eighty acres of corn and a few cows. They ruined a good farm when they built this course." Jacklin was more philosophical about the course. "We have to accept things as they are" he said. "After all, they aren't going to change the course just for me. No golf course will suit everybody perfectly."

The course underwent significant renovations; when the U.S. Open returned twenty-one years later in 1991 it drew generally positive reviews, even from Hill. Hazeltine later hosted the PGA Championship twice (2002, 2009) and the Ryder Cup in 2016.

Jacklin's win was the first in the U.S. Open by a European in over forty years and the last for forty more, until Graeme McDowell won at Pebble Beach in 2010. The next win by an Englishman was three years later in 2013, Justin Rose at Merion.

Future major winners Ben Crenshaw (age 18) and John Mahaffey (age 22) tied for low amateur honors at 301 (+13), tied for 36th place. Just out of high school, Crenshaw was tied for eighth after each of the first two rounds.

== Course layout ==
Hole	1	2	3	4	5	6	7	8	9	Out	10	11	12	13	14	15	16	17	18	In	Total
Yards	456	424	585	196	394	408	563	185	400	3,611	414	590	426	172	355	592	214	344	433	3,540	7,151
Par	4	4	5	3	4	4	5	3	4	36	4	5	4	3	4	5	3	4	4	36	72

== Round summaries ==
=== First round ===
Thursday, June 18, 1970

Place	Player	Score	To par
1	(England) Tony Jacklin	71	−1
T2	(United States) Julius Boros	73	+1
T2	(United States) Chi-Chi Rodríguez	73	+1
T2	(United States) Mason Rudolph	73	+1
T5	(United States) Dick Crawford	74	+2
T5	(United States) Tony Evans	74	+2
T5	(United States) Bobby Mitchell	74	+2
T8	(Canada) Al Balding	75	+3
T8	(United States) Miller Barber	75	+3
T8	(United States) Frank Beard	75	+3
T8	(United States) Don Bies	75	+3
T8	(United States) Gay Brewer	75	+3
T8	(United States) Ben Crenshaw (a)	75	+3
T8	(Australia) Bruce Devlin	75	+3
T8	(United States) Al Geiberger	75	+3
T8	(United States) Dave Hill	75	+3
T8	(United States) Howie Johnson	75	+3
T8	(United States) Bobby Nichols	75	+3
T8	(United States) Larry Ziegler	75	+3

(a) denotes amateur

=== Second round ===
Friday, June 19, 1970

Place	Player	Score	To par
1	(England) Tony Jacklin	71-70=141	−3
2	(United States) Dave Hill	75-69=144	E
T3	(United States) Dick Crawford	74-71=145	+1
T3	(United States) Randy Wolff	78-67=145	+1
5	(United States) Gay Brewer	75-71=146	+2
T6	(New Zealand) Bob Charles	76-71=147	+3
T6	(United States) Howie Johnson	75-72=147	+3
T8	(United States) Frank Beard	75-73=148	+4
T8	(United States) Julius Boros	73-75=148	+4
T8	(United States) Ben Crenshaw (a)	75-73=148	+4
T8	(United States) Bunky Henry	80-68=148	+4
T8	(United States) Bobby Nichols	75-73=148	+4
T8	(United States) Mason Rudolph	73-75=148	+4
T8	(United States) Larry Ziegler	75-73=148	+4

(a) denotes amateur

=== Third round ===
Saturday, June 20, 1970

Place	Player	Score	To par
1	(England) Tony Jacklin	71-70-70=211	−5
2	(United States) Dave Hill	75-69-71=215	−1
3	(United States) Gay Brewer	75-71-71=217	+1
4	(United States) Julius Boros	73-75-70=218	+2
5	(United States) Bob Lunn	77-72-70=219	+3
T6	(United States) Gene Littler	77-72-71=220	+4
T6	(United States) Ken Still	78-71-71=220	+4
T8	(United States) Billy Casper	75-75-71=221	+5
T8	(United States) Dick Crawford	74-71-76=221	+5
T8	(Australia) Bruce Devlin	75-75-71=221	+5
T8	(United States) Raymond Floyd	78-73-70=221	+5
T8	(United States) Mason Rudolph	73-75-73=221	+5
T8	(United States) Randy Wolff	78-67-76=221	+5
T8	(United States) Larry Ziegler	75-73-73=221	+5

=== Final round ===
Sunday, June 21, 1970

Place	Player	Score	To par	Money ($)
1	(England) Tony Jacklin	71-70-70-70=281	−7	30,000
2	(United States) Dave Hill	75-69-71-73=288	E	15,000
T3	(New Zealand) Bob Charles	76-71-75-67=289	+1	9,000
T3	(United States) Bob Lunn	77-72-70-70=289	+1	9,000
5	(United States) Ken Still	78-71-71-71=291	+3	7,000
6	(United States) Miller Barber	75-75-72-70=292	+4	6,000
7	(United States) Gay Brewer	75-71-71-76=293	+5	5,000
T8	(United States) Billy Casper	75-75-71-73=294	+6	3,325
T8	(Australia) Bruce Devlin	75-75-71-73=294	+6	3,325
T8	(United States) Lee Trevino	77-73-74-70=294	+6	3,325
T8	(United States) Larry Ziegler	75-73-73-73=294	+6	3,325
