= Bob Lunn =

American professional golfer (born 1945)

Personal information
- Full name: Robert J. Lunn
- Nickname: Tomato Juice Kid
- Nationality: United States
- Born: April 24, 1945 (age 81) San Francisco, California, U.S.
- Height: 6 ft 2 in (1.88 m)
- Weight: 190 lb (86 kg; 14 st)

Career
- Sport: Golf
- Turned professional: 1965
- Former tours: PGA Tour; Champions Tour
- Professional wins: 9

Number of wins by tour
- PGA Tour: 6
- Other: 3

Best results in major championships
- Masters Tournament: T10: 1970
- PGA Championship: T9: 1971
- U.S. Open: T3: 1970
- The Open Championship: DNP

Robert J. Lunn (born April 24, 1945) is an American professional golfer who played on the PGA Tour in the 1960s and 1970s.

== Early life ==
Lunn was born in San Francisco, California. He was the 1963 U.S. Amateur Public Links champion over Steve Oppermann.

== Professional career ==
In 1965, Lunn turned pro and won six times on the PGA Tour. In 1968, he was named Most Improved Golfer of the Year by Golf Digest. He earned $102,711 and finished 11th on the money list that year after winning two tournaments in a row – the Memphis Open Invitational and the Atlanta Classic. Lunn's best years in professional golf were 1968–72 when he appeared in the top 60 on the money list in each of those years.

Lunn never won a major but won the par-3 contest at Augusta National's pitch & putt course during the week of the 1969 Masters. His best finish in a major was a T-3 at the 1970 U.S. Open. Lunn retired from the PGA Tour in 1980 and took club pro and teaching pro jobs at three clubs in northern California. Currently he holds the position of Senior PGA Tour Professional at Woodbridge Golf and Country Club in Woodbridge, California.

Lunn has played in just over four dozen events on the Champions Tour since turning 50 in 1995. His best finish was T-34 at the 1995 Kaanapali Classic.

== Amateur wins ==
- 1963 U.S. Amateur Public Links

== Professional wins (9) ==
=== PGA Tour wins (6) ===
No.	Date	Tournament	Winning score	Margin of victory	Runner(s)-up
1	May 26, 1968	Memphis Open Invitational	−12 (65-68-68-67=268)	1 stroke	(United States) Monty Kaser
2	Jun 2, 1968	Atlanta Classic	−8 (70-71-70-69=280)	3 strokes	(United States) Lee Trevino
3	Sep 1, 1969	Greater Hartford Open Invitational	−16 (67-68-66-67=268)	Playoff	(United States) Dave Hill
4	Mar 8, 1970	Florida Citrus Invitational	−17 (66-68-67-70=271)	1 stroke	(United States) Arnold Palmer, (Australia) Bob Stanton
5	Jan 10, 1971	Glen Campbell-Los Angeles Open	−10 (68-69-70-67=274)	Playoff	(United States) Billy Casper
6	May 28, 1972	Atlanta Classic (2)	−13 (67-68-71-69=275)	2 strokes	(South Africa) Gary Player

PGA Tour playoff record (2–0)

No.	Year	Tournament	Opponent	Result
1	1969	Greater Hartford Open Invitational	(United States) Dave Hill	Won with birdie on fourth extra hole
2	1971	Glen Campbell-Los Angeles Open	(United States) Billy Casper	Won with birdie on fourth extra hole

=== Other wins (3) ===
- 1969 Southern California Open
- 1984 Northern California PGA Matchplay Championship
- 1986 Northern California PGA Strokeplay Championship

== Results in major championships ==
Tournament	1968	1969	1970	1971	1972	1973	...	1987
Masters Tournament		CUT	T10	34		T43		
U.S. Open	T24	T42	T3	T27	CUT			CUT
PGA Championship			T41	T9	CUT			

Note: Lunn never played in The Open Championship.

Top 10
Did not play

CUT = missed the half-way cut
"T" indicates a tie for a place

== See also ==
- 1966 PGA Tour Qualifying School graduates
