= Ken Still =

American professional golfer (1935–2017)

Personal information
- Full name: Kenneth Allan Still
- Nationality: United States
- Born: February 12, 1935 Tacoma, Washington, U.S.
- Died: March 19, 2017 (aged 82) Tacoma, Washington, U.S.
- Height: 6 ft 1 in (1.85 m)
- Weight: 170 lb (77 kg; 12 st)

Career
- Sport: Golf
- Turned professional: 1953
- Former tours: PGA Tour; Champions Tour
- Professional wins: 5

Number of wins by tour
- PGA Tour: 3
- Other: 2

Best results in major championships
- Masters Tournament: T6: 1971
- PGA Championship: T38: 1967
- U.S. Open: 5th: 1970
- The Open Championship: DNP

Kenneth Allan Still (February 12, 1935 – March 19, 2017) was an American professional golfer who played on both the PGA Tour and the Senior PGA Tour.

== Early life ==
In 1935, Still was born in Tacoma, Washington.

== Professional career ==
In 1953, Still turned professional. Still won three PGA Tour events. In 1969, he won the Florida Citrus Open Invitational in Orlando in the spring and the Greater Milwaukee Open in the summer.

Still took part in the 1969 Ryder Cup matches. While playing a match with Dave Hill against Brian Huggett and Bernard Gallacher, Still and Hill lost a hole after Hill putted out of turn. While upset with what took place, Hill later said "well we won. So let's forget about it." In the final singles encounter Jack Nicklaus had Tony Jacklin pick up a missable putt so the match would end in a 16-16 tie.

Still had two top-10 finishes in major championships during his career: a 5th-place finish at the 1970 U.S. Open, and a T-6 at The Masters in 1971. After reaching the age of 50 in 1985, he began play on the Senior PGA Tour and continued to play in this venue until the late 1990s.

== Personal life and death ==
Still lived in Fircrest, Washington during his career.

In 1964, Still was introduced to Los Angeles Dodgers pitcher Sandy Koufax at Wrigley Field; the two developed a close friendship and Koufax was later one of two best mans at Still's wedding to Linda Evans. After Still died on March 19, 2017, Koufax was an honorary pallbearer at his funeral.

== Awards and honors ==
- February 12, his birthday, is recognized as Ken Still Day in his hometown of Fircrest, Washington.
- In 1995, Still was elected to the Pacific Northwest Section PGA Hall of Fame.

== Professional wins (5) ==
=== PGA Tour wins (3) ===
| No. | Date | Tournament | Winning score | Margin of victory | Runner(s)-up |
|---|---|---|---|---|---|
| 1 | Mar 9, 1969 | Florida Citrus Open Invitational | −10 (74-67-67-70=278) | 1 stroke | (United States) Miller Barber |
| 2 | Aug 10, 1969 | Greater Milwaukee Open | −11 (74-71-67-65=277) | 2 strokes | (South Africa) Gary Player |
| 3 | Oct 25, 1970 | Kaiser International Open Invitational | −10 (68-67-71-72=278) | Playoff | (United States) Lee Trevino, (United States) Bert Yancey |

PGA Tour playoff record (1–0)

| No. | Year | Tournament | Opponents | Result |
|---|---|---|---|---|
| 1 | 1970 | Kaiser International Open Invitational | (United States) Lee Trevino, (United States) Bert Yancey | Won with birdie on first extra hole |

=== Other wins (2) ===
this list may be incomplete

- 1964 British Columbia Open
- 1966 Washington Open
