= Steve Melnyk =

American professional golfer (born 1947)

Personal information
- Full name: Steven Nicholas Melnyk
- Nationality: United States
- Born: February 26, 1947 (age 79) Brunswick, Georgia, U.S.

Career
- Sport: Golf
- College: University of Florida
- Turned professional: 1971 (reinstated amateur ~2009)
- Former tour: PGA Tour
- Professional wins: 1

Best results in major championships
- Masters Tournament: T12: 1972
- PGA Championship: T17: 1975
- U.S. Open: T16: 1977
- The Open Championship: T41: 1970

Steven Nicholas Melnyk (born February 26, 1947) is an American former professional golfer and golf sportscaster best known for his success as an amateur golfer. Melnyk won both the U.S. Amateur and British Amateur.

== Early life ==
Melnyk was born in Brunswick, Georgia. He is of Russian ancestry. Melnyk attended Glynn Academy in Brunswick for his high school education. He won the Georgia Open as an 18-year-old amateur golfer in 1965.

== Amateur career ==
Melnyk attended the University of Florida in Gainesville, Florida, where he played for coach Buster Bishop's Florida Gators men's golf team in National Collegiate Athletic Association (NCAA) competition from 1967 to 1969. He was a two-time All-American at Florida, and was the number one golfer on the 1968 team that won their first NCAA Division I Golf Championship. Melnyk graduated from the University of Florida with a bachelor's degree in industrial management in 1969.

Melnyk won the 1969 U.S. Amateur at Oakmont Country Club, shooting a 2-over-par 286 to beat Vinny Giles by five shots at stroke play. He claimed the British Amateur with a 3 & 2 victory over fellow American Jim Simons at Carnoustie Golf Links in 1971. Melnyk also had wins at the Western Amateur and Eastern Amateur and played on the 1969 and 1971 Walker Cup teams. He won the 1965 Georgia Open as an amateur. He was low amateur in the 1970 British Open (tie for 41st) and at the 1971 Masters Tournament (tie for 24th).

== Professional career ==
In 1971, Melnyk turned professional after his British Amateur win and started playing on the PGA Tour. He did not find the success he had as an amateur carried over to his professional career. He never won a tournament on the PGA Tour but he did place second four times: the 1973 Phoenix Open, 1974 Houston Open, 1979 First NBC New Orleans Open and 1981 Pensacola Open. His best finish in a major was a tie for 12th at the 1972 Masters Tournament. He did win the 1972 Masters Par 3 Contest.

At the 1982 Phoenix Open, Melnyk slipped and broke his right elbow. While recuperating from the injury, he became an on-course reporter for CBS Sports. He resumed playing later that year and both played and reported through the 1984 season when he retired from playing. He stayed with CBS until 1992, when joined ABC Sports. He retired from television in 2004, after 22 years as a reporter and analyst for CBS Sports, ABC Sports and ESPN. He has also designed or co-designed several golf courses.

== Reinstated amateur status ==
In the late 2000s, Melnyk retired from professional golf and broadcasting. He regained his amateur golfer status and continued to play. As of 2011, he remained actively involved as a University of Florida alumnus and serving a ten-year stint on the board of directors of the Gators athletic boosters, including a term as its president.

== Personal life ==
Melnyk lives in Jacksonville, Florida. He and his wife Debbie have two sons, Dalton and Butler. Both sons played collegiate golf at the University of Florida. Butler later became a golf agent for the sports management company Wasserman, and founded his own agency in 2025, with clients such as Ludvig Åberg and Sepp Straka.

Melnyk was previously married to Jacksonville native Laura Price.

== Awards and honors ==
- In 1970, Melnyk was inducted into the University of Florida Athletic Hall of Fame as a "Gator Great."
- In 1992, he was inducted into the Georgia Golf Hall of Fame.
- In 2000, Melnyk was inducted into the Florida Sports Hall of Fame.

== Tournament wins ==
- 1965 Georgia Open (as an amateur)
- 1969 U.S. Amateur, Western Amateur
- 1970 Eastern Amateur
- 1971 British Amateur

== Results in major championships ==
Tournament	1970	1971	1972	1973	1974	1975	1976	1977	1978	1979
Masters Tournament	43	T24_{LA}	T12	T34					51	
U.S. Open	CUT				T35	T29	CUT	T16	T35	CUT
The Open Championship	T41_{LA}	T49								
PGA Championship						T17		T44		

Tournament	1980	1981	1982
Masters Tournament			
U.S. Open		T53	
The Open Championship			
PGA Championship			CUT

Did not play

LA = Low amateur
CUT = missed the half-way cut
"T" indicates a tie for a place

== U.S. national team appearances ==
Amateur

- Walker Cup: 1969 (winners), 1971

== See also ==
- 1971 PGA Tour Qualifying School graduates
- List of Florida Gators men's golfers on the PGA Tour
- List of University of Florida alumni
- List of University of Florida Athletic Hall of Fame members
