= Bert Yancey =

American professional golfer (1938–1994)

Personal information
- Full name: Albert Winsborough Yancey
- Nationality: United States
- Born: August 6, 1938 Chipley, Florida, U.S.
- Died: August 26, 1994 (aged 56) Park City, Utah, U.S.
- Height: 6 ft 1 in (1.85 m)
- Weight: 190 lb (86 kg; 14 st)

Career
- Sport: Golf
- College: U.S. Military Academy
- Turned professional: 1960
- Former tours: PGA Tour; Senior PGA Tour
- Professional wins: 10

Number of wins by tour
- PGA Tour: 7
- Other: 3

Best results in major championships
- Masters Tournament: 3rd: 1967, 1968
- PGA Championship: T22: 1970, 1971
- U.S. Open: 3rd/T3: 1968, 1974
- The Open Championship: 5th: 1973

Albert Winsborough Yancey (August 6, 1938 – August 26, 1994) was an American professional golfer who won seven times on the PGA Tour and later played on the Senior PGA Tour.

== Early life ==
Born in Chipley, Florida, Yancey lived much of his adult life in the Atlanta metro area. He attended the United States Military Academy in West Point, New York, and was captain of the Cadet golf team.

He suffered from a debilitating illness known then as manic-depressive illness, but today it is more commonly called bipolar disorder. His illness first manifested itself during his senior year at West Point. He spent nine months in an Army psychiatric hospital before being discharged.

== Professional career ==
Yancey's condition was largely in remission until 1974, which allowed him to participate in competitive golf. He won seven PGA Tour events in 13 seasons. He also had six top-5 finishes in major championships: 1967 Masters (3rd), 1968 Masters (3rd), 1968 U.S. Open (3rd), 1970 Masters (4th), 1973 British Open (5th), 1974 U.S. Open (T-3).

In 1974, Yancey's illness resurfaced and led him to be involved in a series of bizarre incidents, for which he was at various times arrested, incarcerated, and institutionalized. One such incident occurred at LaGuardia Airport in 1975. Yancey climbed up on a ladder in the terminal and ordered all white people to one side and all black people to the other, and then proceeded to preach on the evils of racism. During the same incident, he claimed to have all of Howard Hughes' money and stated that he was going to use it to cure cancer. Yancey credited Dr. Jane Parker of Payne Whitney Hospital for correctly diagnosing his condition and prescribing lithium. Lithium, however, caused him to have hand tremors, which forced him to retire from competitive golf. He was able to resume competitive play, however, when Tegretol became available.

Yancey was eventually able to return to life as a productive member of society. In 1984, he took a teaching pro job at three South Carolina clubs. He joined the Senior PGA Tour after reaching the age of 50 in August 1988. During the last five years of his life he became a devoted public speaker and advocate for those with mental illnesses. He formed Bogeys, Birdies & Bert, a group "for the education and support of depressive illnesses" in an effort to spread the message on manic depression and mental illness. He also put on seminars, golfing clinics, tournaments and other charitable events to raise money to treat illness and educate the public.

== Death ==
Yancey suffered a fatal heart attack in 1994 at age 56 at the Franklin Quest Championship in Park City, Utah. While on the practice tee preparing for the first round, he experienced discomfort and made a second visit to the first aid tent; he went into cardiac arrest and was pronounced dead at a local hospital a short time later. Yancey is interred at Oakland Cemetery in Tallahassee, Florida, not far from his boyhood home.

The Bert Yancey Mental Health Golf Tournament, based in Augusta, Georgia, is held annually to benefit local chapters of non-profit national organizations Mental Health America, National Alliance on Mental Illness, and the Depression and Bipolar Support Alliance.

== Personal life ==
Yancey was married early in his career. He had a daughter Tracy and three sons: Charles, Scott, and Jeffrey.

Late in life, Yancey re-married to Cheryl.

== Professional wins (10) ==
=== PGA Tour wins (7) ===
No.	Date	Tournament	Winning score	To par	Margin of victory	Runner(s)-up
1	Apr 17, 1966	Azalea Open Invitational	74-69-67-68=278	−10	1 stroke	(United States) Bob Johnson
2	Jun 5, 1966	Memphis Open Invitational	63-69-67-66=265	−15	5 strokes	(United States) Gene Littler
3	Sep 18, 1966	Portland Open Invitational	68-68-68-67=271	−17	3 strokes	(United States) Billy Casper
4	Apr 24, 1967	Dallas Open Invitational	68-69-67-71=274	−6	1 stroke	(Argentina) Roberto De Vicenzo, (United States) Kermit Zarley
5	May 25, 1969	Atlanta Classic	71-68-69-69=277	−11	Playoff	(Australia) Bruce Devlin
6	Jan 25, 1970	Bing Crosby National Pro-Am	67-70-72-69=278	−10	1 stroke	(United States) Jack Nicklaus
7	Jul 23, 1972	American Golf Classic	69-68-67-72=276	−4	Playoff	(United States) Tom Ulozas

PGA Tour playoff record (2–2)

No.	Year	Tournament	Opponent(s)	Result
1	1969	Atlanta Classic	(Australia) Bruce Devlin	Won with birdie on second extra hole
2	1970	Kaiser International Open Invitational	(United States) Ken Still, (United States) Lee Trevino	Still won with birdie on first extra hole
3	1971	Robinson Open Golf Classic	(United States) Labron Harris Jr.	Lost to birdie on third extra hole
4	1972	American Golf Classic	(United States) Tom Ulozas	Won with par on first extra hole

=== Other wins (3) ===
this list is probably incomplete

- 1962 South Carolina Open
- 1963 Pennsylvania Open Championship
- 1969 Argentine Masters

== Playoff record ==
PGA of Japan Tour playoff record (0–1)

No.	Year	Tournament	Opponent	Result
1	1973	Taiheiyo Club Masters	(Japan) Masashi Ozaki	Lost three-hole aggregate playoff; Ozaki: −1 (3-3-4=10), Yancey: +2 (4-5-4=13)

== Results in major championships ==
Tournament	1964	1965	1966	1967	1968	1969	1970	1971	1972	1973	1974	1975
Masters Tournament				3	3	T13	4	CUT	T12	T51		T30
U.S. Open	WD			T42	3	T22	T22	T9	T11	T25	T3	CUT
The Open Championship				T43	T42	T16	T13	T11	T19	5		
PGA Championship			T49	WD	T23	CUT	T22	T22	T29	T24	T32	

Top 10
Did not play

WD = withdrew
CUT = missed the half-way cut
"T" indicates a tie for a place

=== Summary ===
Tournament	Wins	2nd	3rd	Top-5	Top-10	Top-25	Events	Cuts made
Masters Tournament	0	0	2	3	3	5	8	7
U.S. Open	0	0	2	2	3	7	10	8
The Open Championship	0	0	0	1	1	5	7	7
PGA Championship	0	0	0	0	0	4	9	7
Totals	0	0	4	6	7	21	34	29

- Most consecutive cuts made – 14 (1971 U.S. Open – 1975 Masters)
- Longest streak of top-10s – 2 (1968 Masters – 1968 U.S. Open)
