= Tom Weiskopf =

American professional golfer (1942–2022)

Personal information
- Full name: Thomas Daniel Weiskopf
- Nationality: United States
- Born: November 9, 1942 Massillon, Ohio, U.S.
- Died: August 20, 2022 (aged 79) Big Sky, Montana, U.S.
- Height: 6 ft 3 in (1.91 m)
- Spouse: Laurie

Career
- Sport: Golf
- College: Ohio State University
- Turned professional: 1964
- Former tours: PGA Tour; Senior PGA Tour
- Professional wins: 28

Number of wins by tour
- PGA Tour: 16
- European Tour: 2
- Sunshine Tour: 1
- PGA Tour Champions: 4
- Other: 6

Best results in major championships (wins: 1)
- Masters Tournament: T2: 1969, 1972, 1974, 1975
- PGA Championship: 3rd: 1975
- U.S. Open: T2: 1976
- The Open Championship: Won: 1973

Achievements and awards
- World Golf Hall of Fame: 2023 (member page)

Thomas Daniel Weiskopf (November 9, 1942 – August 20, 2022) was an American professional golfer who played on the PGA Tour and the Champions Tour. His most successful decade was the 1970s. He won 16 PGA Tour titles between 1968 and 1982, including the 1973 Open Championship. He was the runner-up at The Masters four times. After winding down his career playing golf, Weiskopf became a noted golf course architect.

== Early life ==
Weiskopf was born in Massillon, Ohio. He attended Benedictine High School in Cleveland and Ohio State University, where he played on the golf team.

== Professional career ==
In 1964, Weiskopf turned professional. Weiskopf's first win on the PGA Tour came at the 1968 Andy Williams-San Diego Open Invitational and fifteen more followed by 1982. His best career season was 1973, when he won seven tournaments around the world, including The Open Championship at Royal Troon, and he would finish that year ranked second in the world according to Mark McCormack's world golf rankings. This was to remain his only major championship victory but he was runner-up at The Masters in 1969, 1972, 1974, and 1975, and had a T2 finish at the 1976 U.S. Open.

Weiskopf won the Canadian Open in 1973 and 1975; the latter win was achieved in dramatic fashion with a one-hole playoff win over archrival and fellow Ohio State University alum Jack Nicklaus when Weiskopf nearly holed his approach on the 15th hole at the Royal Montreal Golf Club's Blue Course. Weiskopf was a member of the United States team in the 1973 and 1975 Ryder Cups. He also qualified for the 1977 team but decided to skip the competition in order to go big-game hunting.

Weiskopf's swing was admired in the golf world. He hit the ball, generated power and had good control as well. Weiskopf's height and displays of his temper on the golf course earned him the nickname of "The Towering Inferno".

=== Later career ===
He also worked as a broadcaster for CBS Sports covering the Masters Tournament, first in 1981 and again from 1985–95. He returned to broadcasting with ESPN and ABC for coverage of The Open Championship from 2008–13.

Weiskopf joined the Senior PGA Tour in 1993 and won several senior tournaments, including one senior major: the 1995 U.S. Senior Open.

Weiskopf got into golf course design working initially with Jay Morrish but later established his own practice. He has at least 40 courses to his credit in many parts of the world, including the Monument and Pinnacle courses at Troon North Golf Club in Scottsdale, Arizona; and Loch Lomond, the venue of the Scottish Open from 1995 to 2010. A drivable par-4 hole is a common element in most of Weiskopf's designs. Many of the courses have received considerable praise by being ranked highly in lists of top courses around the world. In January 2016, it was announced that Weiskopf would lead a renovation of the Torrey Pines North Course in San Diego, California.

== Personal life ==
In 2020, Weiskopf was diagnosed with pancreatic cancer. He died at his home in Big Sky, Montana on August 20, 2022, aged 79. His death was first announced by fellow golfer Tom Watson, who extended his condolences to the Weiskopf family in a tweet.

== Awards and honors ==
He was elected to the World Golf Hall of Fame in 2023 and was inducted on June 10, 2024.

== Amateur wins ==
- 1963 Western Amateur

== Professional wins (28) ==
=== PGA Tour wins (16) ===
Legend
Major championships (1)
Other PGA Tour (15)

No.	Date	Tournament	Winning score	Margin of victory	Runner(s)-up
1	Feb 11, 1968	Andy Williams-San Diego Open Invitational	−15 (66-68-71-68=273)	1 stroke	(United States) Al Geiberger
2	Jul 7, 1968	Buick Open Invitational	−8 (73-67-71-69=280)	1 stroke	(United States) Mike Hill
3	Jun 13, 1971	Kemper Open	−11 (66-72-70-69=277)	Playoff	(United States) Dale Douglass, (South Africa) Gary Player, (United States) Lee Trevino
4	Aug 22, 1971	IVB-Philadelphia Golf Classic	−14 (67-71-66-70=274)	1 stroke	(United States) Dave Hill
5	Feb 27, 1972	Jackie Gleason's Inverrary Classic	−10 (69-72-69-68=278)	1 stroke	(United States) Jack Nicklaus
6	May 13, 1973	Colonial National Invitation	−4 (69-68-70-69=276)	1 stroke	(Australia) Bruce Crampton, (United States) Jerry Heard
7	Jun 3, 1973	Kemper Open (2)	−17 (65-70-68-68=271)	3 strokes	(United States) Lanny Wadkins
8	Jun 10, 1973	IVB-Philadelphia Golf Classic (2)	−14 (67-71-65-71=274)	4 strokes	(United States) Jim Barber
9	Jul 14, 1973	The Open Championship	−12 (68-67-71-70=276)	3 strokes	(England) Neil Coles, (United States) Johnny Miller
10	Jul 29, 1973	Canadian Open	−10 (67-73-68-70=278)	2 strokes	(United States) Forrest Fezler
11	Apr 6, 1975	Greater Greensboro Open	−9 (64-71-72-68=275)	3 strokes	(United States) Al Geiberger
12	Jul 27, 1975	Canadian Open (2)	−6 (65-74-68-67=274)	Playoff	(United States) Jack Nicklaus
13	Jun 5, 1977	Kemper Open (3)	−11 (67-71-69-70=277)	2 strokes	(United States) George Burns, (United States) Bill Rogers
14	Mar 12, 1978	Doral-Eastern Open	−16 (67-70-67-68=272)	1 stroke	(United States) Jack Nicklaus
15	Sep 20, 1981	LaJet Classic	−10 (73-67-70-68=278)	2 strokes	(United States) Gil Morgan
16	Jul 4, 1982	Western Open	−12 (69-67-70-70=276)	1 stroke	(United States) Larry Nelson

PGA Tour playoff record (2–3)

No.	Year	Tournament	Opponent(s)	Result
1	1966	Greater Greensboro Open	(United States) Doug Sanders	Lost to par on second extra hole
2	1969	Greater Greensboro Open	(United States) Julius Boros, (United States) Gene Littler (United States) Orville Moody	Littler won with birdie on fifth extra hole Weiskopf eliminated by par on first hole
3	1971	Kemper Open	(United States) Dale Douglass, (South Africa) Gary Player, (United States) Lee Trevino	Won with birdie on first extra hole
4	1975	Canadian Open	(United States) Jack Nicklaus	Won with birdie on first extra hole
5	1979	Southern Open	(United States) Ed Fiori	Lost to birdie on second extra hole

=== European Tour wins (2) ===
Legend
Major championships (1)
Other European Tour (1)

No.	Date	Tournament	Winning score	Margin of victory	Runners-up
1	Jul 14, 1973	The Open Championship	−12 (68-67-71-70=276)	3 strokes	(England) Neil Coles, (United States) Johnny Miller
2	Aug 23, 1981	Benson & Hedges International Open	−16 (66-69-68-69=272)	1 stroke	(Republic of Ireland) Eamonn Darcy, (West Germany) Bernhard Langer

=== Southern Africa Tour wins (1) ===
No.	Date	Tournament	Winning score	Margin of victory	Runner-up
1	Dec 1, 1973	Luyt Lager PGA Championship	−7 (70-69-67-67=273)	3 strokes	(South Africa) Vin Baker

=== South American Golf Circuit wins (1) ===
No.	Date	Tournament	Winning score	Margin of victory	Runner-up
1	Nov 18, 1979	Argentine Open	+5 (71-72-76-70=289)	3 strokes	(Colombia) Alberto Rivadeneira

=== Other wins (5) ===
No.	Date	Tournament	Winning score	Margin of victory	Runner(s)-up
1	Sep 29, 1965	Ohio Open	−7 (70-71-70-70=281)	9 strokes	(United States) David Lawrence
2	Oct 14, 1972	Piccadilly World Match Play Championship	4 and 3		(United States) Lee Trevino
3	Sep 9, 1973	World Series of Golf	−3 (71-66=137)	3 strokes	(United States) Johnny Miller, (United States) Jack Nicklaus
4	Sep 13, 1982	Jerry Ford Invitational	−6 (66-70=136)	3 strokes	(United States) Tom Purtzer, (United States) Fuzzy Zoeller
5	Feb 28, 1993	Chrysler Cup Individual Trophy	−14 (66-67-69=202)	4 strokes	(United States) George Archer

=== Senior PGA Tour wins (4) ===
Legend
Senior major championships (1)
Other Senior PGA Tour (3)

No.	Date	Tournament	Winning score	Margin of victory	Runner(s)-up
1	Aug 28, 1994	Franklin Quest Championship	−12 (68-67-69=204)	Playoff	(United States) Dave Stockton
2	Jul 2, 1995	U.S. Senior Open	−13 (69-69-69-68=275)	4 strokes	(United States) Jack Nicklaus
3	Mar 31, 1996	SBC Dominion Seniors	−9 (69-69-69=207)	2 strokes	(United States) Bob Dickson, (Australia) Graham Marsh, (South Africa) Gary Player
4	Jun 9, 1996	Pittsburgh Senior Classic	−11 (68-67-70=205)	3 strokes	(Scotland) Brian Barnes, (United States) J. C. Snead

Senior PGA Tour playoff record (1–0)

No.	Year	Tournament	Opponent	Result
1	1994	Franklin Quest Championship	(United States) Dave Stockton	Won with birdie on first extra hole

== Major championships ==
=== Wins (1) ===
Year	Championship	54 holes	Winning score	Margin	Runners-up
1973	The Open Championship	1 shot lead	−12 (68-67-71-70=276)	3 strokes	(England) Neil Coles (United States) Johnny Miller

=== Results timeline ===
Tournament	1965	1966	1967	1968	1969
Masters Tournament				T16	T2
U.S. Open	T40		15	T24	T22
The Open Championship					
PGA Championship		T72		CUT	T44

Tournament	1970	1971	1972	1973	1974	1975	1976	1977	1978	1979
Masters Tournament	T23	T6	T2	T34	T2	T2	T9	T14	T11	T41
U.S. Open	T30	CUT	8	3	T15	T29	T2	3	T4	T4
The Open Championship	T22	T40	T7	1	T7	15	T17	T22	T17	CUT
PGA Championship	CUT	T22	T62	T6	WD	3	T8	T58	T4	CUT

Tournament	1980	1981	1982	1983	1984	1985	1986	1987	1988	1989
Masters Tournament	CUT		T10	T20	T35					
U.S. Open	37		T39	T24						
The Open Championship	T16		CUT	T45						CUT
PGA Championship	T10	T27	CUT	T30	CUT					

Tournament	1990	1991	1992	1993	1994	1995	1996	1997	1998	1999
Masters Tournament										
U.S. Open							CUT			
The Open Championship	CUT	T101	CUT			CUT				
PGA Championship										

Tournament	2000	2001	2002	2003	2004
Masters Tournament					
U.S. Open					
The Open Championship					CUT
PGA Championship					

Win
Top 10
Did not play

CUT = missed the halfway cut (3rd round cut in 1982 Open Championship)
WD = withdrew
"T" indicates a tie for a place.

=== Summary ===
Tournament	Wins	2nd	3rd	Top-5	Top-10	Top-25	Events	Cuts made
Masters Tournament	0	4	0	4	7	12	16	15
U.S. Open	0	1	2	5	6	11	18	16
The Open Championship	1	0	0	1	3	9	19	12
PGA Championship	0	0	1	2	5	6	18	12
Totals	1	5	3	12	21	38	71	55

- Most consecutive cuts made — 18 (1975 Masters — 1979 U.S. Open)
- Longest streak of top-10s — 4 (1973 U.S. Open — 1974 Masters)

== Champions Tour major championships ==
=== Wins (1) ===
Year	Championship	Winning score	Margin	Runner(s)-up
1995	U.S. Senior Open	−13 (69-69-69-68=275)	4 strokes	(United States) Jack Nicklaus

== U.S. national team appearances ==
Professional

- Ryder Cup: 1973 (winners), 1975 (winners)
- World Cup: 1972
