= Larry Hinson =

American professional golfer (born 1944)

Personal information
- Nationality: United States
- Born: August 5, 1944 (age 82) Gastonia, North Carolina, U.S.
- Height: 6 ft 2 in (1.88 m)
- Weight: 155 lb (70 kg; 11.1 st)

Career
- Sport: Golf
- College: East Tennessee State University
- Turned professional: 1968
- Former tour: PGA Tour
- Professional wins: 2

Number of wins by tour
- PGA Tour: 1
- Other: 1

Best results in major championships
- Masters Tournament: T30: 1971
- PGA Championship: T4: 1970
- U.S. Open: T9: 1971
- The Open Championship: DNP

Larry Hinson (born August 5, 1944) is an American professional golfer. He played on the PGA Tour from 1968 to 1976.

== Early life ==
In 1944, Hinson was born in Gastonia, North Carolina. He has lived almost his entire life in Douglas, Georgia. Despite having a left arm slightly withered from boyhood polio, he was able to compete in amateur and professional golf.

== Amateur career ==
Hinson attended East Tennessee State University and was a member of the golf team. He was the individual champion at the NCAA Division II Men's Golf Championships in 1967.

== Professional career ==
In 1968, Hinson turned professional. Early in the year, he had success at Spring 1968 PGA Tour Qualifying School. He joined the PGA Tour.

Hinson had more than 30 top-10 finishes during his PGA Tour career including a win at the 1969 Greater New Orleans Open Invitational. In that tournament, he defeated Frank Beard on the third playoff hole. He finished the 1975 San Antonio Texas Open tied for first place in regulation play at 13-under-par 275; however, he lost in a playoff when Don January made a birdie on the second extra hole. His best finish in a major was a T-4 at the 1970 PGA Championship. Hinson was the recipient of the 1971 Ben Hogan Award.

Hinson is the general manager and head professional at Hinson Hills Golf Center in Douglas, Georgia, a family-run 18-hole par-3 course. He invented a device he calls the Stance Minder to help a golfer establish the proper set-up position.

== Awards and honors ==
In 1971, Hinson earned the Ben Hogan Award.

== Amateur wins ==
- 1967 NCAA Division II Championship

== Professional wins (2) ==
=== PGA Tour wins (1) ===
No.	Date	Tournament	Winning score	Margin of victory	Runner-up
1	May 4, 1969	Greater New Orleans Open Invitational	−13 (69-68-71-67=275)	Playoff	(United States) Frank Beard

PGA Tour playoff record (1–1)

No.	Year	Tournament	Opponent	Result
1	1969	Greater New Orleans Open Invitational	(United States) Frank Beard	Won with par on third extra hole
2	1975	San Antonio Texas Open	(United States) Don January	Lost to birdie on second extra hole

=== Other wins (1) ===
- 1990 Dan J. Parrish Pro-Am Golf Classic

== See also ==
- Spring 1968 PGA Tour Qualifying School graduates
