= Frank Beard (golfer) =

American golfer, PGA Tour member (born 1939)

Personal information
- Full name: Joseph Franklin Beard
- Nationality: United States
- Born: May 1, 1939 (age 87) Dallas, Texas, U.S.
- Height: 6 ft 0 in (1.83 m)
- Weight: 180 lb (82 kg; 13 st)

Career
- Sport: Golf
- College: University of Florida
- Turned professional: 1962
- Former tours: PGA Tour; Champions Tour
- Professional wins: 14

Number of wins by tour
- PGA Tour: 11
- PGA Tour Champions: 1
- Other: 2

Best results in major championships
- Masters Tournament: T5: 1968
- PGA Championship: T6: 1968
- U.S. Open: 3rd/T3: 1965, 1975
- The Open Championship: T19: 1972

Achievements and awards
- PGA Tour money list winner: 1969

Joseph Franklin Beard (born May 1, 1939) is an American former professional golfer who was a member of the PGA Tour and Champions Tour. Beard won eleven PGA Tour events.

== Early life ==
Beard was born in Dallas, Texas. He attended Saint Xavier High School in Louisville, Kentucky, and won the Kentucky state high school golf championship as a senior in 1957.

== Amateur career ==
Beard attended the University of Florida in Gainesville, Florida, where he played for coach Conrad Rehling's Florida Gators men's golf team in National Collegiate Athletic Association (NCAA) competition from 1958 to 1961. He was recognized as an All-American in 1960 and 1961. He graduated from the university with a bachelor's degree in accounting in 1961.

== Professional career ==
Beard turned professional in 1962. He topped the PGA Tour money list in 1969 with earnings of $175,223. He has eleven wins on the tour including victories in the Tournament of Champions in 1967 and 1970. He was a member of the U.S. team in the Ryder Cup in 1969 and 1971 and had a 2–3–3 win–loss–half record. His best finishes in a major tournament were a third-place finish and a tie for third in the 1965 and 1975 U.S. Opens. After turning 50 years old, he played on the Senior PGA Tour (now the Champions Tour), where he won the 1990 Murata Reunion Pro-Am.

Beard has also worked as a golf commentator on ESPN.

== Awards and honors ==
- In 1969, Beard was inducted into the University of Florida Athletic Hall of Fame as a "Gator Great."
- In 1969, Beard won the PGA Tour money list
- In 1986, Beard was inducted into the Kentucky Athletic Hall of Fame.

== Professional wins (14) ==
=== PGA Tour wins (11) ===
No.	Date	Tournament	Winning score	Margin of victory	Runner(s)-up
1	Nov 10, 1963	Frank Sinatra Open Invitational	−6 (68-72-69-69=278)	1 stroke	(United States) Jerry Steelsmith
2	Apr 25, 1965	Texas Open Invitational	−10 (70-67-65-68=270)	3 strokes	(United States) Gardner Dickinson
3	May 16, 1966	Greater New Orleans Open Invitational	−12 (68-71-70-67=276)	2 strokes	(United States) Gardner Dickinson
4	Apr 16, 1967	Tournament of Champions	−6 (65-68-74-71=278)	1 stroke	(United States) Arnold Palmer
5	May 7, 1967	Houston Champions International	−10 (67-70-70-67=274)	1 stroke	(United States) Arnold Palmer
6	Jul 9, 1967	500 Festival Open Invitation	−9 (70-71-69-69=279)	3 strokes	(United States) Rod Funseth, (United States) Rives McBee
7	Jul 13, 1969	Minnesota Golf Classic	−15 (69-67-67-66=269)	7 strokes	(United States) Tommy Aaron, (South Africa) Hugh Inggs
8	Aug 3, 1969	Westchester Classic	−13 (69-72-67-67=275)	1 stroke	(United States) Bert Greene
9	Apr 26, 1970	Tournament of Champions (2)	−15 (70-64-68-71=273)	7 strokes	(United States) Billy Casper, (England) Tony Jacklin, (South Africa) Gary Player
10	Aug 9, 1970	American Golf Classic	−4 (73-65-67-71=276)	2 strokes	(United States) Tommy Aaron, (Australia) Bruce Crampton, (United States) Jack Nicklaus
11	May 2, 1971	Greater New Orleans Open Invitational	−12 (70-71-67-68=276)	1 stroke	(United States) Hubert Green

PGA Tour playoff record (0–3)

No.	Year	Tournament	Opponent(s)	Result
1	1968	American Golf Classic	(United States) Lee Elder, (United States) Jack Nicklaus	Nicklaus won with birdie on fifth extra hole Beard eliminated by birdie on first hole
2	1969	Greater New Orleans Open	(United States) Larry Hinson	Lost to par on third extra hole
3	1974	World Open Golf Championship	(United States) Johnny Miller, (United States) Bob Murphy, (United States) Jack Nicklaus	Miller won with birdie on second extra hole Murphy eliminated by par on first hole

=== Other wins (2) ===
- 1964 Kentucky Open
- 1967 Waterloo Open Golf Classic

=== Senior PGA Tour wins (1) ===
No.	Date	Tournament	Winning score	Margin of victory	Runner-up
1	Apr 29, 1990	Murata Reunion Pro-Am	−9 (66-67-74=207)	2 strokes	(United States) Walt Zembriski

Senior PGA Tour playoff record (0–1)

No.	Year	Tournament	Opponents	Result
1	1989	Northville Long Island Classic	(United States) Butch Baird, (United States) Don Bies, (United States) Orville Moody	Baird won with birdie on first extra hole

== Results in major championships ==
Tournament	1964	1965	1966	1967	1968	1969	1970	1971	1972	1973	1974	1975	1976
Masters Tournament		T8	T22	T26	T5	T19	9	T9	T41	T24	T22	CUT	T43
U.S. Open	CUT	3	T17	T54	T52	T50	T22	CUT	CUT	T25	T12	T3	CUT
The Open Championship								CUT	T19				
PGA Championship	T33	T45	11	T7	T6	10	T55	T13	T53	T46	T11	CUT	

Top 10
Did not play

CUT = missed the half-way cut
"T" indicates a tie for a place

=== Summary ===
Tournament	Wins	2nd	3rd	Top-5	Top-10	Top-25	Events	Cuts made
Masters Tournament	0	0	0	1	4	8	12	11
U.S. Open	0	0	2	2	2	6	13	9
The Open Championship	0	0	0	0	0	1	2	1
PGA Championship	0	0	0	0	3	6	12	11
Totals	0	0	2	3	9	21	39	32

- Most consecutive cuts made – 20 (1964 PGA – 1971 Masters)
- Longest streak of top-10s – 2 (three times)

== U.S. national team appearances ==
Professional

- Ryder Cup: 1969 (tie, cup retained), 1971 (winners)

== See also ==
- List of American Ryder Cup golfers
- List of Florida Gators men's golfers on the PGA Tour
- List of University of Florida alumni
- List of University of Florida Athletic Hall of Fame members
