= 1973 Masters Tournament =

- Front cover of the 1973 Masters Guide

Tournament information
- Dates: April 5–9, 1973
- Location: Augusta, Georgia; 33.503°N 82.020°W
- Course: Augusta National Golf Club
- Organized by: Augusta National Golf Club
- Tour: PGA Tour

Statistics
- Par: 72
- Length: 6,980 yards (6,383 m)
- Field: 82 players, 57 after cut
- Cut: 151 (+7)
- Winner's share: $30,000

Champion
- (United States) Tommy Aaron
- 283 (−5)

Location map
- Location in the United States Location in Georgia

The 1973 Masters Tournament was the 37th Masters Tournament, held April 5–9 at the Augusta National Golf Club. Due to weather delays, the final round was played on Monday for the first time since 1961.

Tommy Aaron, age 36, won his only major title, one stroke ahead of runner-up J. C. Snead. Before this win at Augusta, Aaron was best known as the player who kept Roberto De Vicenzo's incorrect scorecard at the Masters five years earlier in 1968. Ironically, Aaron's final round playing partner in 1973, Johnny Miller, recorded a higher score when keeping Aaron's card, and Aaron caught the mistake. This was his third and last victory on the PGA Tour, and after this win, Aaron's best result in a major was a tie for 28th at the Masters in 1979.

Gary Player played in 52 Masters from 1957 through 2009; and missed only this one, to recover from leg and abdominal surgery. He returned in 1974 to win the second of his three green jackets.

Gay Brewer won the fourteenth Par 3 contest on Wednesday with a seven-under 20. At the previous Masters, the 1967 champion was hospitalized in Augusta for ulcers on Wednesday night and missed the tournament.

This Masters was the last as competitors for two former champions: Gene Sarazen (1935) and Ralph Guldahl (1939).

== Field ==
1. Masters champions

George Archer (8), Gay Brewer (10,11), Billy Casper (8,9,10,12), Charles Coody (8,12), Doug Ford, Bob Goalby (8), Ralph Guldahl, Jack Nicklaus (2,3,4,8,9,11,12), Arnold Palmer (9,11,12), Gene Sarazen, Sam Snead (10), Art Wall Jr.

- Jack Burke Jr., Jimmy Demaret, Claude Harmon, Ben Hogan, Herman Keiser, Cary Middlecoff, Byron Nelson, Henry Picard, and Gary Player (3,4,8,9,10) did not play. Player missed his only Masters in 53 years to recover from surgery.

The following categories only apply to Americans

2. U.S. Open champions (last five years)

Orville Moody (9), Lee Trevino (3,9,11,12)

3. The Open champions (last five years)

4. PGA champions (last five years)

Julius Boros, Raymond Floyd (10), Dave Stockton (12)

5. The first eight finishers in the 1972 U.S. Amateur

Doug Ballenger (a), Ben Crenshaw (7,8,a), Vinny Giles (6,7,a), Charles Harrison (a), Mike Killian (a), Marty West (7,a)

- Mark Hayes (7,a) forfeited his exemption by turning professional. Bruce Robertson forfeited his exemption by losing his amateur status.

6. Previous two U.S. Amateur and Amateur champions

- Steve Melnyk forfeited his exemption by turning professional.

7. Members of the 1972 U.S. Eisenhower Trophy team

8. Top 24 players and ties from the 1972 Masters Tournament

Homero Blancas (9), Gardner Dickinson (12), Al Geiberger, Hubert Green, Paul Harney, Jerry Heard (10,11), Jim Jamieson (10,11), Jerry McGee, Steve Melnyk, Bobby Mitchell (11), Lanny Wadkins (11), Tom Weiskopf (9), Bert Yancey (9,11)

9. Top 16 players and ties from the 1972 U.S. Open

Don January, Don Massengale, Johnny Miller (11), Bobby Nichols, Chi-Chi Rodríguez (11), Cesar Sanudo, Jim Simons, Kermit Zarley (11)

10. Top eight players and ties from 1972 PGA Championship

Tommy Aaron, Phil Rodgers, Doug Sanders (11)

11. Winners of PGA Tour events since the previous Masters

Buddy Allin, Deane Beman, Jim Colbert, Bob Dickson, Rod Funseth, Lou Graham, Dave Hill, Mike Hill, Babe Hiskey, Grier Jones, Bob Lunn, John Schlee, J. C. Snead (12), DeWitt Weaver

12. Members of the U.S. 1971 Ryder Cup team

Miller Barber, Frank Beard, Gene Littler, Mason Rudolph

13. Foreign invitations

Brian Barnes, Bob Charles (8), Gary Cowan (6,a), Bruce Crampton (8,9,11), Roberto De Vicenzo (8), Bruce Devlin (8,11), David Graham (11), Han Chang-sang, Trevor Homer (6,a), Guy Hunt, Tony Jacklin (2,3), George Knudson (11), Takaaki Kono (8), Lu Liang-Huan, Peter Oosterhuis, Masashi Ozaki, Bob Shaw (11)

- Numbers in brackets indicate categories that the player would have qualified under had they been American.

== Round summaries ==
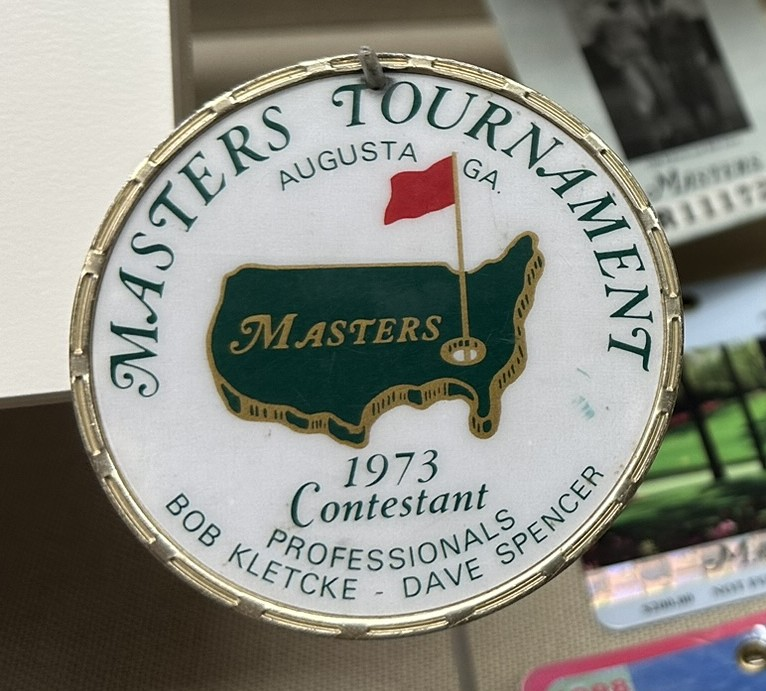
A golf bag tag used by Charles Harrison at the 1973 Masters Tournament

=== First round ===
Thursday, April 5, 1973

| Place | Player | Score | To par |
|---|---|---|---|
| 1 | (United States) Tommy Aaron | 68 | −4 |
| T2 | (United States) Jack Nicklaus | 69 | −3 |
| T2 | (Japan) Masashi Ozaki | 69 | −3 |
| T4 | (United States) Bob Dickson | 70 | −2 |
| T4 | (United States) J. C. Snead | 70 | −2 |
| T6 | (United States) Grier Jones | 71 | −1 |
| T6 | (United States) Phil Rodgers | 71 | −1 |
| T8 | (Australia) David Graham | 72 | E |
| T8 | (United States) Hubert Green | 72 | E |
| T8 | (United States) Steve Melnyk | 72 | E |
| T8 | (United States) Chi-Chi Rodríguez | 72 | E |
| T8 | (United States) Mason Rudolph | 72 | E |
| T8 | (Mexico) Cesar Sanudo | 72 | E |
| T8 | (United States) Dave Stockton | 72 | E |

=== Second round ===
Friday, April 6, 1973

| Place | Player | Score | To par |
|---|---|---|---|
| T1 | (United States) Tommy Aaron | 68-73=141 | −3 |
| T1 | (United States) Gay Brewer | 75-66=141 | −3 |
| T1 | (United States) Bob Dickson | 70-71=141 | −3 |
| T1 | (United States) J. C. Snead | 70-71=141 | −3 |
| 5 | (United States) Chi-Chi Rodríguez | 72-70=142 | −2 |
| T6 | (United States) Bob Goalby | 73-70=143 | −1 |
| T6 | (United States) Grier Jones | 71-72=143 | −1 |
| T6 | (England) Peter Oosterhuis | 73-70=143 | −1 |
| T6 | (Japan) Masashi Ozaki | 69-74=143 | −1 |
| T10 | (United States) Bob Charles | 74-70=144 | E |
| T10 | (United States) Gardner Dickinson | 74-70=144 | E |
| T10 | (United States) Jim Jamieson | 73-71=144 | E |
| T10 | (United States) Johnny Miller | 75-69=144 | E |
| T10 | (United States) Mason Rudolph | 72-72=144 | E |

=== Third round ===
Sunday, April 8, 1973

Heavy rain on Saturday morning limited play to the first several pairs when the course was deemed unplayable. The third round was restarted in the late morning on Sunday from split tees.

| Place | Player | Score | To par |
|---|---|---|---|
| 1 | (England) Peter Oosterhuis | 73-70-68=211 | −5 |
| T2 | (United States) Bob Goalby | 73-70-71=214 | −2 |
| T2 | (United States) Jim Jamieson | 73-71-70=214 | −2 |
| T2 | (United States) J. C. Snead | 70-71-73=214 | −2 |
| T5 | (United States) Tommy Aaron | 68-73-74=215 | −1 |
| T5 | (United States) Gay Brewer | 75-66-74=215 | −1 |
| T5 | (United States) Johnny Miller | 75-69-71=215 | −1 |
| T5 | (United States) Chi-Chi Rodríguez | 72-70-73=215 | −1 |
| T9 | (United States) Gardner Dickinson | 74-70-72=216 | E |
| T9 | (Japan) Masashi Ozaki | 69-74-73=216 | E |

=== Final round ===
Monday, April 9, 1973

==== Final leaderboard ====
Champion
Silver Cup winner (low amateur)
(a) = amateur
(c) = past champion

Top 10
| Place | Player | Score | To par | Money (US$) |
|---|---|---|---|---|
| 1 | (United States) Tommy Aaron | 68-73-74-68=283 | −5 | 30,000 |
| 2 | (United States) J. C. Snead | 70-71-73-70=284 | −4 | 22,500 |
| T3 | (United States) Jim Jamieson | 73-71-70-71=285 | −3 | 12,500 |
| T3 | (United States) Jack Nicklaus (c) | 69-77-73-66=285 | −3 | 12,500 |
| T3 | (England) Peter Oosterhuis | 73-70-68-74=285 | −3 | 12,500 |
| T6 | (United States) Bob Goalby (c) | 73-70-71-74=288 | E | 6,250 |
| T6 | (United States) Johnny Miller | 75-69-71-73=288 | E | 6,250 |
| T8 | (Australia) Bruce Devlin | 73-72-72-72=289 | +1 | 4,250 |
| T8 | (Japan) Masashi Ozaki | 69-74-73-73=289 | +1 | 4,250 |
| T10 | (United States) Gay Brewer (c) | 75-66-74-76=291 | +3 | 3,425 |
| T10 | (United States) Gardner Dickinson | 74-70-72-75=291 | +3 | 3,425 |
| T10 | (United States) Don January | 75-71-75-70=291 | +3 | 3,425 |
| T10 | (United States) Chi-Chi Rodríguez | 72-70-73-76=291 | +3 | 3,425 |

Leaderboard below the top 10
| Place | Player | Score | To par | Money ($) |
|---|---|---|---|---|
| T14 | (United States) Hubert Green | 72-74-75-71=292 | +4 | 3,000 |
| T14 | (United States) Mason Rudolph | 72-72-77-71=292 | +4 | 3,000 |
| T14 | (United States) Dave Stockton | 72-74-71-75=292 | +4 | 3,000 |
| T17 | (United States) Billy Casper (c) | 75-73-72-73=293 | +5 | 2,550 |
| T17 | (United States) Bob Dickson | 70-71-76-76=293 | +5 | 2,550 |
| T17 | (United States) Lou Graham | 77-73-72-71=293 | +5 | 2,550 |
| T17 | (United States) Babe Hiskey | 74-73-72-74=293 | +5 | 2,550 |
| T17 | (United States) Gene Littler | 77-72-71-73=293 | +5 | 2,550 |
| T17 | (United States) Kermit Zarley | 74-71-77-71=293 | +5 | 2,550 |
| 23 | (United States) Phil Rodgers | 71-75-75-73=294 | +6 | 2,200 |
| T24 | (United States) Frank Beard | 73-75-71-76=295 | +7 | 2,100 |
| T24 | (United States) Ben Crenshaw (a) | 73-72-74-76=295 | +7 | 0 |
| T24 | (United States) Paul Harney | 77-71-74-73=295 | +7 | 2,100 |
| T24 | (United States) Bobby Nichols | 79-72-76-68=295 | +7 | 2,100 |
| T24 | (United States) Arnold Palmer (c) | 77-72-76-70=295 | +7 | 2,100 |
| T29 | (New Zealand) Bob Charles | 74-70-74-78=296 | +8 | 1,750 |
| T29 | (United States) Charles Coody (c) | 74-73-79-70=296 | +8 | 1,750 |
| T29 | (Australia) David Graham | 72-74-77-73=296 | +8 | 1,750 |
| T29 | (United States) Sam Snead (c) | 74-76-73-73=296 | +8 | 1,750 |
| T29 | (United States) Lanny Wadkins | 75-74-71-76=296 | +8 | 1,750 |
| T34 | (United States) Vinny Giles (a) | 78-71-72-76=297 | +9 | 0 |
| T34 | (United States) Steve Melnyk | 72-74-79-72=297 | +9 | 1,750 |
| T34 | (United States) Tom Weiskopf | 77-71-75-74=297 | +9 | 1,750 |
| T37 | (United States) Rod Funseth | 73-75-74-76=298 | +10 | 1,675 |
| T37 | (United States) Al Geiberger | 75-76-77-70=298 | +10 | 1,675 |
| T37 | (United States) Dave Hill | 77-70-76-75=298 | +10 | 1,675 |
| T37 | (United States) Grier Jones | 71-72-77-78=298 | +10 | 1,675 |
| T37 | (United States) Art Wall Jr. (c) | 79-69-74-76=298 | +10 | 1,675 |
| T37 | (United States) Marty West (a) | 75-70-77-76=298 | +10 | 0 |
| T43 | (United States) George Archer (c) | 73-74-74-78=299 | +11 | 1,675 |
| T43 | (United States) Miller Barber | 78-72-80-69=299 | +11 | 1,675 |
| T43 | (United States) Jim Colbert | 74-72-76-77=299 | +11 | 1,675 |
| T43 | (Australia) Bruce Crampton | 74-74-77-74=299 | +11 | 1,675 |
| T43 | (Chinese Taipei) Lu Liang-Huan | 74-72-75-78=299 | +11 | 1,675 |
| T43 | (United States) Bob Lunn | 76-74-72-77=299 | +11 | 1,675 |
| T43 | (United States) Cesar Sanudo | 72-75-76-76=299 | +11 | 1,675 |
| T43 | (United States) Lee Trevino | 74-75-75-75=299 | +11 | 1,675 |
| T51 | (Argentina) Roberto De Vicenzo | 74-74-74-78=300 | +12 | 1,600 |
| T51 | (Japan) Takaaki Kono | 74-74-78-74=300 | +12 | 1,600 |
| T51 | (United States) Bert Yancey | 75-74-74-77=300 | +12 | 1,600 |
| 54 | (United States) Raymond Floyd | 76-73-75-77=301 | +13 | 1,600 |
| 55 | (United States) Don Massengale | 74-74-76-78=302 | +14 | 1,600 |
| 56 | (United States) Jerry Heard | 76-75-72-80=303 | +15 | 1,600 |
| 57 | (United States) John Schlee | 76-73-74-82=305 | +17 | 1,600 |
| CUT | (United States) Buddy Allin | 76-76=152 | +8 | |
| CUT | (United States) Deane Beman | 77-75=152 | +8 | |
| CUT | (Canada) Gary Cowan (a) | 74-78=152 | +8 | |
| CUT | (South Korea) Han Chang-sang | 77-75=152 | +8 | |
| CUT | (England) Tony Jacklin | 77-75=152 | +8 | |
| CUT | (Australia) Bob Shaw | 74-78=152 | +8 | |
| CUT | (United States) Jerry McGee | 81-72=153 | +9 | |
| CUT | (United States) Julius Boros | 75-79=154 | +10 | |
| CUT | (United States) Doug Ford (c) | 76-78=154 | +10 | |
| CUT | (United States) Mike Killian (a) | 79-76=155 | +11 | |
| CUT | (United States) Bobby Mitchell | 81-74=155 | +11 | |
| CUT | (Scotland) Brian Barnes | 79-77=156 | +12 | |
| CUT | (Canada) George Knudson | 79-77=156 | +12 | |
| CUT | (United States) Mike Hill | 79-78=157 | +13 | |
| CUT | (United States) Jim Simons | 79-78=157 | +13 | |
| CUT | (United States) Doug Ballenger (a) | 81-77=158 | +14 | |
| CUT | (United States) Homero Blancas | 81-77=158 | +14 | |
| CUT | (United States) Orville Moody | 81-77=158 | +14 | |
| CUT | (United States) DeWitt Weaver | 81-77=158 | +14 | |
| CUT | (England) Guy Hunt | 78-81=159 | +15 | |
| CUT | (United States) Doug Sanders | 83-78=161 | +17 | |
| CUT | (United States) Ralph Guldahl (c) | 82-80=162 | +18 | |
| CUT | (United States) Charles Harrison (a) | 81-81=162 | +18 | |
| CUT | (England) Trevor Homer (a) | 81-88=169 | +25 | |
| CUT | (United States) Gene Sarazen (c) | 88-86=174 | +30 | |

==== Scorecard ====
| Hole | 1 | 2 | 3 | 4 | 5 | 6 | 7 | 8 | 9 | 10 | 11 | 12 | 13 | 14 | 15 | 16 | 17 | 18 |
|---|---|---|---|---|---|---|---|---|---|---|---|---|---|---|---|---|---|---|
| Par | 4 | 5 | 4 | 3 | 4 | 3 | 4 | 5 | 4 | 4 | 4 | 3 | 5 | 4 | 5 | 3 | 4 | 4 |
| (United States) Aaron | −2 | −3 | −4 | −4 | −4 | −4 | −4 | −5 | −5 | −4 | −3 | −3 | −4 | −4 | −5 | −5 | −5 | −5 |
| (United States) Snead | −3 | −3 | −3 | −4 | −4 | −4 | −4 | −5 | −5 | −5 | −5 | −3 | −4 | −4 | −4 | −4 | −4 | −4 |
| (United States) Jamieson | −3 | −4 | −3 | −2 | −2 | −2 | −2 | −2 | −2 | −2 | −1 | −1 | −2 | −2 | −2 | −2 | −3 | −3 |
| (United States) Nicklaus | +2 | +1 | +1 | +2 | +1 | E | E | −1 | −1 | −1 | −1 | −1 | −2 | −1 | −2 | −2 | −2 | −3 |
| (England) Oosterhuis | −5 | −5 | −6 | −5 | −5 | −5 | −4 | −4 | −4 | −4 | −3 | −3 | −4 | −4 | −3 | −3 | −3 | −3 |
| (United States) Goalby | −2 | −3 | −2 | −2 | −2 | −2 | −2 | −2 | −2 | −1 | −1 | E | E | +1 | +1 | +1 | +1 | E |
| (United States) Miller | −1 | −1 | −1 | −1 | −1 | −2 | −2 | −2 | −2 | −2 | −2 | −1 | −1 | −1 | −2 | −2 | −2 | E |

Cumulative tournament scores, relative to par

| Birdie | Bogey | Double bogey |
