= 1972 Masters Tournament =

- Front cover of the 1972 Masters Guide

Tournament information
- Dates: April 6–9, 1972
- Location: Augusta, Georgia; 33.503°N 82.020°W
- Course: Augusta National Golf Club
- Organized by: Augusta National Golf Club
- Tour: PGA Tour

Statistics
- Par: 72
- Length: 6,980 yards (6,383 m)
- Field: 84 players, 47 after cut
- Cut: 151 (+7)
- Winner's share: $25,000

Champion
- (United States) Jack Nicklaus
- 286 (−2)
- Location in the United States Location in Georgia

The 1972 Masters Tournament was the 36th Masters Tournament, held April 6–9 at Augusta National Golf Club in Augusta, Georgia.

Jack Nicklaus opened with a 68 and led wire-to-wire to win the fourth of his six Masters titles, three strokes ahead of three runners-up. It was the tenth of 18 major titles as a professional for Nicklaus, who also won the U.S. Open in 1972 and was the runner-up at the Open Championship in Scotland, one stroke behind Lee Trevino.

It was the first Masters played without founder Bobby Jones, who died in December 1971 at age 69. This Masters was also the debut of twenty-year-old Ben Crenshaw of the University of Texas, a future two-time champion who was low amateur at 295 (T19).

Banned from the last five Masters, commentator Jack Whitaker returned to the CBS telecast in 1972. At the end of the 18-hole Monday playoff in 1966, he had referred to the portion of the gallery trailing the players as a "mob."

Nicklaus became the third wire-to-wire winner in Masters history, following Craig Wood in 1941 and Arnold Palmer in 1960. Through 2026, there have been six; the next were Raymond Floyd in 1976, Jordan Spieth in 2015, and Rory McIlroy in 2026.

== Field ==
1. Masters champions

George Archer (9,11), Billy Casper (8,10,11,12), Charles Coody (8,12), Doug Ford, Bob Goalby (11), Ralph Guldahl, Herman Keiser, Jack Nicklaus (2,3,4,8,9,10,11,12), Arnold Palmer (8,11,12), Gary Player (3,8,10,11), Gene Sarazen, Sam Snead, Art Wall Jr.

- Gay Brewer (9), Jack Burke Jr., Jimmy Demaret, Claude Harmon, Ben Hogan, Cary Middlecoff, Byron Nelson and Henry Picard did not play. Brewer was hospitalized in Augusta for ulcers on Wednesday night and missed the tournament.

The following categories only apply to Americans

2. U.S. Open champions (last five years)

Orville Moody (8), Lee Trevino (3,9,11,12)

3. The Open champions (last five years)

4. PGA champions (last five years)

Julius Boros, Raymond Floyd (8,9), Don January (8), Dave Stockton (8,11,12)

5. The first eight finishers in the 1971 U.S. Amateur

Rick Bendall (a), Ben Crenshaw (a), Tom Culligan (a), Vinny Giles (7,a), Jim McLean (a), Eddie Pearce (a), Marty West (a)

6. Previous two U.S. Amateur and Amateur champions

- Steve Melnyk (7,8) and Lanny Wadkins (7,9) forfeited their exemptions by turning professional but qualified in other categories.

7. Members of the 1971 U.S. Walker Cup team

William C. Campbell (a), John Farquhar (a), Jim Gabrielsen (a), Bill Hyndman (a), Tom Kite (a), Jim Simons (9,a)

- Allen Miller forfeited his exemption by turning professional.

8. Top 24 players and ties from the 1971 Masters Tournament

Tommy Aaron, Frank Beard (11,12), Dave Eichelberger (11), Al Geiberger, Bert Greene, Hale Irwin (11), Dick Lotz, Steve Melnyk, Johnny Miller (9,11), Bobby Mitchell (11), Bob Murphy, Ken Still, Tom Weiskopf (11)

- Gene Littler (11,12) had been diagnosed with cancer and did not play.

9. Top 16 players and ties from the 1971 U.S. Open

Jim Colbert, Jerry Heard (11), Larry Hinson, Jerry McGee, Bobby Nichols, Chi-Chi Rodríguez, Bob Rosburg (11), Lanny Wadkins, Bert Yancey

10. Top eight players and ties from 1971 PGA Championship

Miller Barber (11,12), Tommy Bolt, Gibby Gilbert, Dave Hill, Jim Jamieson

11. Winners of PGA Tour events since the previous Masters

Homero Blancas, Gardner Dickinson (12), Hubert Green, Paul Harney, Labron Harris Jr., Grier Jones, DeWitt Weaver

12. Members of the U.S. 1971 Ryder Cup team

Mason Rudolph, J. C. Snead

13. Foreign invitations

Harry Bannerman, Brian Barnes, Bob Charles (9), Bobby Cole (9), Gary Cowan (5,6,a), Bruce Crampton (8,11), Roberto De Vicenzo (3,8), Bruce Devlin (8), David Graham, Hsieh Yung-yo, Tony Jacklin (2,3,11), Takaaki Kono, Lu Liang-Huan, Peter Oosterhuis, Masashi Ozaki, Ramón Sota

- Numbers in brackets indicate categories that the player would have qualified under had they been American.

== Round summaries ==
=== First round ===
Thursday, April 6, 1972

Place	Player	Score	To par
1	(United States) Jack Nicklaus	68	−4
2	(United States) Sam Snead	69	−3
3	(United States) Arnold Palmer	70	−2
T4	(United States) Paul Harney	71	−1
T4	(United States) Jim Simons (a)	71	−1
T6	(United States) Frank Beard	72	E
T6	(New Zealand) Bob Charles	72	E
T6	(Australia) Bruce Crampton	72	E
T6	(United States) Gibby Gilbert	72	E
T6	(England) Tony Jacklin	72	E
T6	(United States) Jim Jamieson	72	E
T6	(United States) Steve Melnyk	72	E
T6	(United States) Bobby Nichols	72	E
T6	(United States) Lanny Wadkins	72	E
T6	(United States) Bert Yancey	72	E

=== Second round ===
Friday, April 7, 1972

Place	Player	Score	To par
1	(United States) Jack Nicklaus	68-71=139	−5
2	(United States) Paul Harney	71-69=140	−4
3	(United States) Bert Yancey	72-69=141	−3
4	(United States) Jim Jamieson	72-70=142	−2
T5	(United States) Charles Coody	73-70=143	−1
T5	(United States) Bobby Nichols	72-71=143	−1
T7	(Argentina) Roberto De Vicenzo	75-69=144	E
T7	(United States) Jerry Heard	73-71=144	E
T7	(United States) Steve Melnyk	72-72=144	E
T7	(United States) Sam Snead	69-75=144	E
T7	(United States) Lanny Wadkins	72-72=144	E

=== Third round ===
Saturday, April 8, 1972

Place	Player	Score	To par
1	(United States) Jack Nicklaus	68-71-73=212	−4
2	(United States) Jim Jamieson	72-70-71=213	−3
T3	(United States) Paul Harney	71-69-75=215	−1
T3	(United States) Tom Weiskopf	74-71-70=215	−1
T5	(United States) Homero Blancas	76-71-69=216	E
T5	(Australia) Bruce Crampton	72-75-69=216	E
T5	(United States) Jerry Heard	73-71-72=216	E
T5	(United States) Bobby Mitchell	73-72-71=216	E
T9	(United States) Charles Coody	73-70-74=217	+1
T9	(United States) Bert Yancey	72-69-76=217	+1

=== Final round ===
Sunday, April 9, 1972

==== Final leaderboard ====
Champion
Silver Cup winner (low amateur)
(a) = amateur
(c) = past champion

Top 10
Place	Player	Score	To par	Money (US$)
1	(United States) Jack Nicklaus (c)	68-71-73-74=286	−2	25,000
T2	(Australia) Bruce Crampton	72-75-69-73=289	+1	15,833
T2	(United States) Bobby Mitchell	73-72-71-73=289	+1	15,833
T2	(United States) Tom Weiskopf	74-71-70-74=289	+1	15,833
T5	(United States) Homero Blancas	76-71-69-74=290	+2	6,200
T5	(Australia) Bruce Devlin	74-75-70-71=290	+2	6,200
T5	(United States) Jerry Heard	73-71-72-74=290	+2	6,200
T5	(United States) Jim Jamieson	72-70-71-77=290	+2	6,200
T5	(United States) Jerry McGee	73-74-71-72=290	+2	6,200
T10	(South Africa) Gary Player (c)	73-75-72-71=291	+3	3,600
T10	(United States) Dave Stockton	76-70-74-71=291	+3	3,600

Leaderboard below the top 10
Place	Player	Score	To par	Money ($)
T12	(United States) George Archer (c)	73-75-72-72=292	+4	3,100
T12	(United States) Charles Coody (c)	73-70-74-75=292	+4	3,100
T12	(United States) Al Geiberger	76-70-74-72=292	+4	3,100
T12	(United States) Steve Melnyk	72-72-74-74=292	+4	3,100
T12	(United States) Bert Yancey	72-69-76-75=292	+4	3,100
T17	(United States) Billy Casper (c)	75-71-74-74=294	+6	2,750
T17	(United States) Bob Goalby (c)	73-76-72-73=294	+6	2,750
T19	(United States) Ben Crenshaw (a)	73-74-74-74=295	+7	0
T19	(Japan) Takaaki Kono	76-72-73-74=295	+7	2,500
T19	(United States) Lanny Wadkins	72-72-77-74=295	+7	2,500
T22	(New Zealand) Bob Charles	72-76-74-74=296	+8	2,160
T22	(Argentina) Roberto De Vicenzo	75-69-76-76=296	+8	2,160
T22	(United States) Gardner Dickinson	77-72-73-74=296	+8	2,160
T22	(United States) Hubert Green	75-74-74-73=296	+8	2,160
T22	(United States) Paul Harney	71-69-75-81=296	+8	2,160
T27	(England) Tony Jacklin	72-76-75-74=297	+9	1,750
T27	(United States) Tom Kite (a)	74-74-76-73=297	+9	0
T27	(United States) Sam Snead (c)	69-75-76-77=297	+9	1,750
30	(United States) J. C. Snead	74-77-72-75=298	+10	1,750
T31	(United States) Bert Greene	75-75-77-72=299	+11	1,750
T31	(United States) Bobby Nichols	72-71-80-76=299	+11	1,750
T33	(Scotland) Harry Bannerman	78-72-72-78=300	+12	1,675
T33	(United States) Grier Jones	73-75-76-76=300	+12	1,675
T33	(United States) Arnold Palmer (c)	70-75-74-81=300	+12	1,675
T33	(United States) Lee Trevino	75-76-77-72=300	+12	1,675
37	(Chinese Taipei) Lu Liang-Huan	75-72-80-74=301	+13	1,675
T38	(United States) Gibby Gilbert	72-76-74-81=303	+15	1,675
T38	(England) Peter Oosterhuis	74-76-80-73=303	+15	1,675
40	(United States) Ken Still	74-77-77-76=304	+16	1,675
T41	(United States) Frank Beard	72-79-79-76=306	+18	1,600
T41	(United States) Jim Simons (a)	71-79-76-80=306	+18	0
T43	(United States) Jim McLean (a)	75-75-78-79=307	+19	0
T43	(United States) Bob Murphy	75-76-77-79=307	+19	1,600
T45	(United States) Larry Hinson	77-74-79-78=308	+20	1,600
T45	(United States) Bob Rosburg	74-73-83-78=308	+20	1,600
47	(United States) DeWitt Weaver	74-76-81-79=310	+22	1,600
CUT	(United States) Rick Bendall (a)	77-75=152	+8	
CUT	(United States) Julius Boros	77-75=152	+8	
CUT	(United States) Hale Irwin	81-71=152	+8	
CUT	(United States) Don January	75-77=152	+8	
CUT	(United States) Johnny Miller	76-76=152	+8	
CUT	(United States) Mason Rudolph	74-78=152	+8	
CUT	(United States) Art Wall Jr. (c)	77-75=152	+8	
CUT	(United States) Tommy Bolt	76-77=153	+9	
CUT	(United States) Chi-Chi Rodríguez	74-79=153	+9	
CUT	(United States) Tommy Aaron	78-76=154	+10	
CUT	(United States) Doug Ford (c)	76-78=154	+10	
CUT	(United States) Labron Harris Jr.	79-75=154	+10	
CUT	(United States) Dave Hill	76-78=154	+10	
CUT	(Japan) Masashi Ozaki	74-80=154	+10	
CUT	(United States) Eddie Pearce (a)	79-75=154	+10	
CUT	(South Africa) Bobby Cole	78-77=155	+11	
CUT	(United States) Dave Eichelberger	78-77=155	+11	
CUT	(Australia) David Graham	76-79=155	+11	
CUT	(Chinese Taipei) Hsieh Yung-yo	79-76=155	+11	
CUT	(United States) Dick Lotz	77-78=155	+11	
CUT	(United States) Vinny Giles (a)	78-78=156	+12	
CUT	(United States) Miller Barber	75-82=157	+13	
CUT	(United States) Jim Colbert	74-83=157	+13	
CUT	(Spain) Ramón Sota	78-79=157	+13	
CUT	(United States) Marty West (a)	80-77=157	+13	
CUT	(Canada) Gary Cowan (a)	76-82=158	+14	
CUT	(United States) Raymond Floyd	76-82=158	+14	
CUT	(United States) Gene Sarazen (c)	79-79=158	+14	
CUT	(United States) Tom Culligan (a)	78-81=159	+15	
CUT	(United States) Jim Gabrielsen (a)	81-78=159	+15	
CUT	(United States) Herman Keiser (c)	80-79=159	+15	
CUT	(United States) Bill Hyndman (a)	75-85=160	+16	
CUT	(United States) Orville Moody	80-81=161	+17	
CUT	(Scotland) Brian Barnes	85-80=165	+21	
CUT	(United States) John Farquhar (a)	84-81=165	+21	
CUT	(United States) Ralph Guldahl (c)	89-80=169	+25	
WD	(United States) William C. Campbell (a)	75	+3	

==== Scorecard ====
Hole	1	2	3	4	5	6	7	8	9	10	11	12	13	14	15	16	17	18
Par	4	5	4	3	4	3	4	5	4	4	4	3	5	4	5	3	4	4
(United States) Nicklaus	−4	−5	−5	−5	−5	−5	−4	−5	−5	−5	−4	−4	−4	−3	−2	−2	−2	−2
(Australia) Crampton	−1	−1	E	E	E	E	+2	+2	+2	+2	+2	+1	+1	+1	+1	+1	+1	+1
(United States) Mitchell	E	E	E	E	+1	+1	+2	+1	+1	+1	E	+1	+1	+1	+1	+1	+1	+1
(United States) Weiskopf	E	E	+1	+2	+2	+2	+1	+1	+1	+2	+3	+3	+3	+3	+2	+2	+1	+1
(United States) Blancas	E	E	E	+1	+1	+1	+1	+1	+1	+3	+3	+3	+2	+2	+1	+1	+2	+2
(United States) Heard	−1	−1	E	−1	E	+1	+1	+2	+1	+1	+1	E	+1	+1	+1	+2	+2	+2
(United States) Jamieson	−2	−3	−2	−2	−1	−1	E	E	E	E	+1	+3	+2	+2	+1	+2	+1	+2
(United States) Harney	E	+1	+1	+2	+2	+2	+2	+2	+2	+1	+1	+1	+3	+4	+5	+7	+7	+8

Cumulative tournament scores, relative to par

Birdie	Bogey	Double bogey
