= Arnold Palmer Invitational =

Golf tournament held in Bay Hill, Florida, US

Tournament information
- Location: Bay Hill, Florida
- Established: 1966
- Course: Bay Hill Club and Lodge
- Par: 72
- Length: 7,466 yards (6,827 m)
- Tour: PGA Tour
- Format: Stroke play
- Prize fund: US$20,000,000
- Month played: March
- Website: arnoldpalmerinvitational.com

Tournament record score
- Aggregate: 264 Payne Stewart (1987)
- To par: −23 Buddy Allin (1973)

Current champion
- (United States) Akshay Bhatia

Location map
- Location in the United States Location in Florida

The Arnold Palmer Invitational is a professional golf tournament on the PGA Tour. It is played each March at the Bay Hill Club and Lodge, a private golf resort owned since 1974 by Arnold Palmer in Bay Hill, a suburb southwest of Orlando, Florida.

The event was founded in 1979 as a successor to the Florida Citrus Open Invitational, which debuted in 1966 and was played at Rio Pinar Country Club, east of Orlando, through 1978. Arnold Palmer won the Florida Citrus Open in 1971.

Since 1979, the tournament title has had several different names, most of them including "Bay Hill," but has played under the Palmer name since 2007. On March 21, 2012, the Arnold Palmer Invitational and MasterCard Worldwide announced an extension to MasterCard's "Presented by" sponsorship until the 2016 tournament.

In June 2014, the PGA Tour approved a resolution to grant the winner a three-year exemption, one more than regular Tour events and on par with winners of the World Golf Championships, The Tour Championship, and the Memorial Tournament.

The winner receives a red cardigan sweater in memory of Arnold Palmer, a tradition that began with the 2017 tournament after Palmer's death in 2016.

In 2019, the event was added to the Open Qualifying Series, giving up to three non-exempt players entry into The Open Championship.

== Invitational status ==
The Arnold Palmer Invitational is one of only five tournaments given "invitational" status by the PGA Tour. Consequently, it has a reduced field of only 69 players in 2024 (as compared to most full-field open tournaments with fields of 144 or 156 players). The other four tournaments with invitational status are the Genesis Invitational, RBC Heritage, the Charles Schwab Challenge, and the Memorial Tournament. Invitational tournaments have smaller fields (between 69 and 132 players) and have more freedom than full-field open tournaments in determining which players are eligible to participate in their event, as invitational tournaments are not required to fill their fields using the PGA Tour Priority Ranking System. Furthermore, unlike full-field open tournaments, invitational tournaments do not offer open qualifying (aka Monday qualifying).

== Field ==
The field consists of 120 players invited using the following criteria:

1. Arnold Palmer Invitational winners before 2000 and in the last five years
2. The Players Championship and major championship winners in the last five years
3. The Tour Championship, World Golf Championships, and Memorial Tournament winners in the past three years
4. Tournament winners in the past year
5. Playing member of last-named U.S. Ryder Cup team; current PGA Tour members who were playing members on last named European Ryder Cup team, U.S. Presidents Cup team, and International Presidents Cup team
6. Prior year U.S. Amateur winner (if still an amateur)
7. Top 50 Official World Golf Ranking (as of Friday prior)
8. PGA Tour life members
9. 18 sponsors exemptions– two from Web.com Tour finals, eight members not otherwise exempt, and eight unrestricted
10. Up to two foreign players designated by the commissioner
11. Top 70 from prior year's FedEx Cup points list
12. Members in the top 125 non-member category whose prior year non-WGC points equal or exceed the 70th position on the prior year FedEx Cup points list
13. Top 70 from current year's FedEx Cup points list (as of Friday prior)
14. PGA Section (North Florida) champion/player of the year
15. Remaining positions filled from the current year's FedEx Cup points list

Arnold Palmer had a lifetime invitation.

== Tournament highlights ==
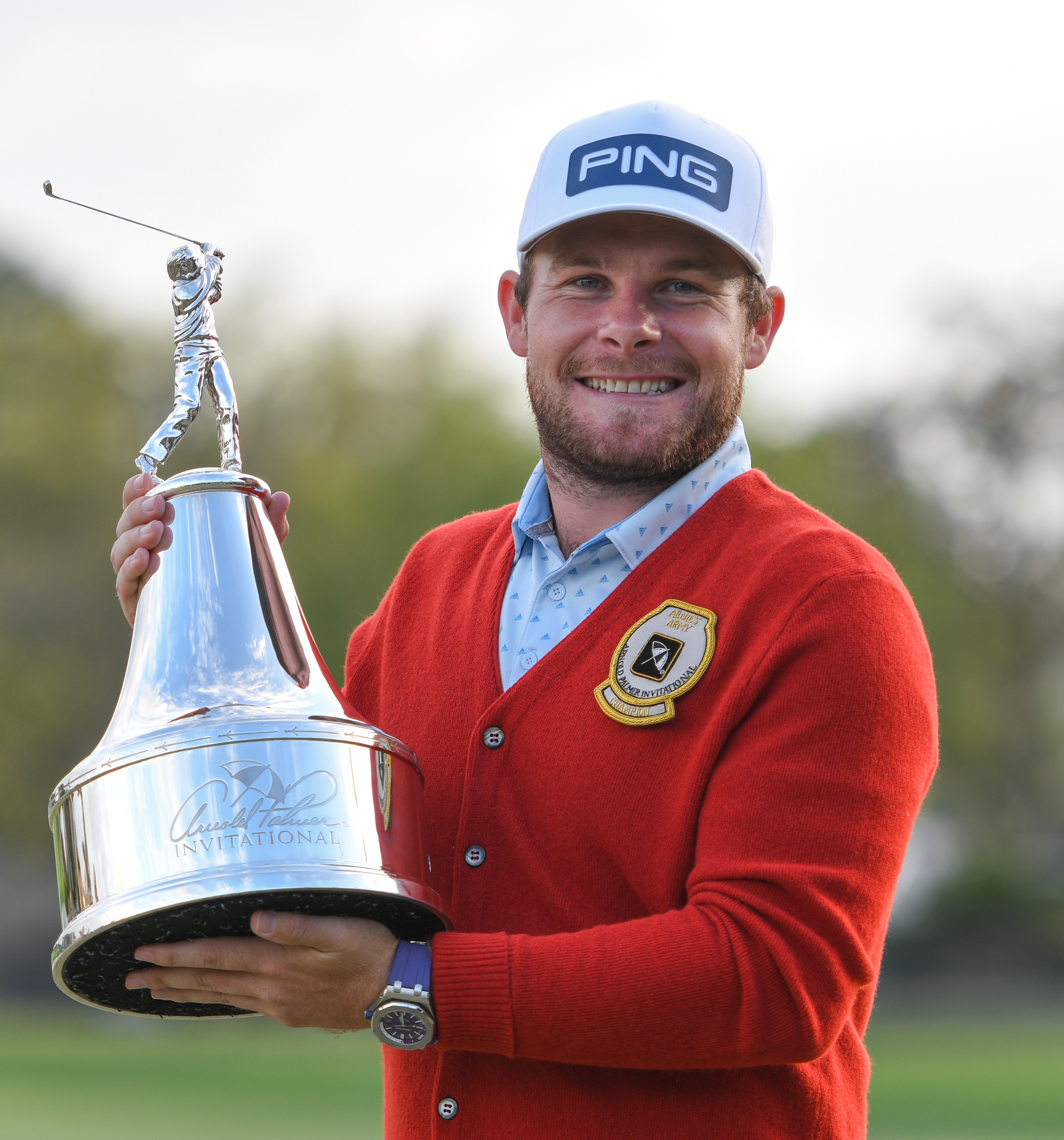
Tyrrell Hatton with the trophy after winning in 2020.

- 1966: Lionel Hebert wins the inaugural version of the tournament. He wins by two shots over Jack Nicklaus, Charles Coody, and Dick Lytle.
- 1968: Dan Sikes breaks out of a 5-way logjam to win by one shot over Tom Weiskopf. At the end of 54 holes, Sikes had been tied for the lead with Jack Nicklaus, Bruce Devlin, Miller Barber, and Bob Charles. Officials said this was the first time there had ever been a five-way tie for the lead after 54 holes at a PGA event.
- 1971: Arnold Palmer wins the event eight years before he becomes its host. He beats Julius Boros by one shot.
- 1973: Vietnam War veteran Buddy Allin shoots a tournament record 23 under par to breeze to an eight-shot victory over Charles Coody.
- 1974: Jerry Heard becomes the tournament's first two-time winner. He beats Homero Blancas and Jim Jamieson by two shots.
- 1975: Lee Trevino wins by a stroke shooting a final round 71. He won the title over Hale Irwin and Ben Crenshaw. This was Trevino's 20th PGA Tour win.
- 1976: Early on a Monday morning, Hale Irwin defeats Kermit Zarley on the sixth hole of a sudden death playoff after play was suspended due to darkness on Sunday. While speaking to the press on Sunday evening, Irwin blamed NBC Sports for there not being enough time to finish the playoff.
- 1979: Bob Byman wins the tournament's first edition to be played at Bay Hill. He defeats John Schroeder on the second hole of a sudden death playoff.
- 1980: Dave Eichelberger wins by three shots over Leonard Thompson. The temperatures were so cold that Eichelberger wore pantyhose during the final round.
- 1982: Tom Kite chips in for birdie on the first hole of a sudden death playoff to defeat Jack Nicklaus and Denis Watson.
- 1984: Gary Koch shoots a final round 63 before defeating George Burns on the second hole of a sudden death playoff. Koch is the only champion in the tournament's history to win both at Rio Pinar and Bay Hill.
- 1985: Coming off back surgery less than six months previously, Fuzzy Zoeller wins at Bay Hill. He finishes two shots ahead of Tom Watson.
- 1987: Payne Stewart, who owned a home just off Bay Hill's 12th tee, notches his third career PGA Tour title. He beats David Frost by three shots.
- 1989: Tom Kite wins for a second time at Bay Hill by defeating Davis Love III on the second hole of a sudden death playoff. Before the playoff, Kite and Love made a double bogey on the tournament's 72nd hole.
- 1990: Robert Gamez holes a 7-iron on the 72nd hole for an eagle two allowing him to win by one shot over Greg Norman.
- 1992: Fred Couples wins by nine shots over Gene Sauers. With his win, Couples becomes the #1 ranked player in the world.
- 1995: Loren Roberts becomes the first returning champion to defend his title successfully. He beats Brad Faxon by two shots.
- 1996: Paul Goydos wins for the first time on the PGA Tour. He beats Jeff Maggert by one shot and Tom Purtzer by two. During the tournament's second round, Purtzer incurred a two-shot penalty by playing the wrong ball.
- 1998: During the tournament's final round, John Daly hit six balls in the water on the sixth hole. He finishes the hole with a final score of 18.
- 2000: Tiger Woods wins at Bay Hill for the first time. He beats Davis Love III by four shots.
- 2003: Tiger Woods becomes the first golfer since Gene Sarazen at the 1930 Miami Open to win the same tournament in four consecutive years. He wins by 11 shots over Kirk Triplett, Stewart Cink, Kenny Perry, and Brad Faxon.
- 2005: Kenny Perry wins by two shots over Vijay Singh and Graeme McDowell. Perry and Singh were tied for the lead until Singh made a double bogey at the 72nd hole.
- 2008: Tiger Woods sinks a 25-foot birdie putt at the 72nd hole to defeat Bart Bryant by one shot. It's Wood's fifth Bay Hill triumph in addition to his winning the fifth consecutive tournament he had played in.
- 2009: Tiger Woods wins at Bay Hill for the 2nd straight year and sixth time overall. He birdies the 72nd hole to defeat Sean O'Hair by one shot.
- 2012: Tiger Woods wins the Arnold Palmer Invitational for the seventh time, ending a winless streak on the PGA Tour dating back 27 events to September 13, 2009.
- 2013: Tiger Woods wins for a record-tying eighth time at the Arnold Palmer Invitational while holing three eagles during the week, the first time a player has accomplished the feat since 2001; he ascends to the number 1 ranking for the first time since October 2010.
- 2014: With world number one Woods out of the tournament, the focus was on world number two Adam Scott. Scott led the first three rounds, but struggled in the fourth round, finishing third behind Keegan Bradley and first-time PGA Tour winner Matt Every.
- 2015: Matt Every holed an 18-foot birdie putt on the 72nd hole to beat Henrik Stenson by one shot and become the third golfer to defend his title at the Arnold Palmer Invitational. In the third round, Daniel Berger recorded a double eagle at the par-5 6th hole, the first since the tournament moved to Bay Hill in 1979. Zach Johnson repeated the feat in the final round on the par-5 16th.

== Course layout ==
Hole	1	2	3	4	5	6	7	8	9	Out	10	11	12	13	14	15	16	17	18	In	Total
Yards	461	231	434	590	390	555	199	460	480	3,800	400	438	574	370	215	467	511	221	458	3,654	7,454
Par	4	3	4	5	4	5	3	4	4	36	4	4	5	4	3	4	5	3	4	36	72

== Winners ==
Year	Winner	Score	To par	Margin of victory	Runner(s)-up	Purse ($)	Winner's share ($)
Arnold Palmer Invitational
2026	(United States) Akshay Bhatia	273	−15	Playoff	(United States) Daniel Berger	20,000,000	4,000,000
2025	(United States) Russell Henley	277	−11	1 stroke	(United States) Collin Morikawa	20,000,000	4,000,000
2024	(United States) Scottie Scheffler (2)	273	−15	5 strokes	(United States) Wyndham Clark	20,000,000	4,000,000
2023	(United States) Kurt Kitayama	279	−9	1 stroke	(United States) Harris English (Northern Ireland) Rory McIlroy	20,000,000	3,600,000
2022	(United States) Scottie Scheffler	283	−5	1 stroke	(England) Tyrrell Hatton (United States) Billy Horschel (Norway) Viktor Hovland	12,000,000	2,160,000
2021	(United States) Bryson DeChambeau	277	−11	1 stroke	(England) Lee Westwood	9,300,000	1,674,000
2020	(England) Tyrrell Hatton	284	−4	1 stroke	(Australia) Marc Leishman	9,300,000	1,674,000
2019	(Italy) Francesco Molinari	276	−12	2 strokes	(England) Matt Fitzpatrick	9,100,000	1,638,000
2018	(Northern Ireland) Rory McIlroy	270	−18	3 strokes	(United States) Bryson DeChambeau	8,900,000	1,602,000
2017	(Australia) Marc Leishman	277	−11	1 stroke	(United States) Charley Hoffman (United States) Kevin Kisner	8,700,000	1,566,000
2016	(Australia) Jason Day	271	−17	1 stroke	(United States) Kevin Chappell	6,300,000	1,134,000
2015	(United States) Matt Every (2)	269	−19	1 stroke	(Sweden) Henrik Stenson	6,300,000	1,134,000
2014	(United States) Matt Every	275	−13	1 stroke	(United States) Keegan Bradley	6,200,000	1,116,000
2013	(United States) Tiger Woods (8)	275	−13	2 strokes	(England) Justin Rose	6,200,000	1,116,000
2012	(United States) Tiger Woods (7)	275	−13	5 strokes	(Northern Ireland) Graeme McDowell	6,000,000	1,080,000
2011	(Scotland) Martin Laird	280	−8	1 stroke	(United States) Steve Marino	6,000,000	1,080,000
2010	(South Africa) Ernie Els (2)	277	−11	2 strokes	(Italy) Edoardo Molinari (United States) Kevin Na	6,000,000	1,080,000
2009	(United States) Tiger Woods (6)	275	−5	1 stroke	(United States) Sean O'Hair	6,000,000	1,080,000
2008	(United States) Tiger Woods (5)	270	−10	1 stroke	(United States) Bart Bryant	5,800,000	1,044,000
2007	(Fiji) Vijay Singh	272	−8	2 strokes	(United States) Rocco Mediate	5,500,000	990,000
Bay Hill Invitational
2006	(Australia) Rod Pampling	274	−14	1 stroke	(England) Greg Owen	5,500,000	990,000
2005	(United States) Kenny Perry	276	−12	2 strokes	(Northern Ireland) Graeme McDowell (Fiji) Vijay Singh	5,000,000	900,000
2004	(United States) Chad Campbell	270	−18	6 strokes	(Australia) Stuart Appleby	5,000,000	900,000
2003	(United States) Tiger Woods (4)	269	−19	11 strokes	(United States) Stewart Cink (United States) Brad Faxon (United States) Kenny Perry (United States) Kirk Triplett	4,500,000	810,000
2002	(United States) Tiger Woods (3)	275	−13	4 strokes	(New Zealand) Michael Campbell	4,000,000	720,000
2001	(United States) Tiger Woods (2)	273	−15	1 stroke	(United States) Phil Mickelson	3,500,000	630,000
2000	(United States) Tiger Woods	270	−18	4 strokes	(United States) Davis Love III	3,000,000	540,000
1999	(United States) Tim Herron	274	−14	Playoff	(United States) Tom Lehman	2,500,000	450,000
1998	(South Africa) Ernie Els	274	−14	4 strokes	(United States) Bob Estes (United States) Jeff Maggert	2,000,000	360,000
1997	(United States) Phil Mickelson	272	−16	3 strokes	(Australia) Stuart Appleby	1,500,000	270,000
1996	(United States) Paul Goydos	275	−13	1 stroke	(United States) Jeff Maggert	1,200,000	216,000
Nestle Invitational
1995	(United States) Loren Roberts (2)	272	−16	2 strokes	(United States) Brad Faxon	1,200,000	216,000
1994	(United States) Loren Roberts	275	−13	1 stroke	(Zimbabwe) Nick Price (Fiji) Vijay Singh (United States) Fuzzy Zoeller	1,200,000	216,000
1993	(United States) Ben Crenshaw	280	−8	2 strokes	(United States) Davis Love III (United States) Rocco Mediate (Fiji) Vijay Singh	1,000,000	180,000
1992	(United States) Fred Couples	269	−19	9 strokes	(United States) Gene Sauers	1,000,000	180,000
1991	(United States) Andrew Magee	203 (Note: Shortened to 54 holes due to rain.)	−13	2 strokes	(United States) Tom Sieckmann	1,000,000	180,000
1990	(United States) Robert Gamez	274	−14	1 stroke	(Australia) Greg Norman	900,000	162,000
1989	(United States) Tom Kite (2)	278	−6	Playoff	(United States) Davis Love III	800,000	144,000
Hertz Bay Hill Classic
1988	(United States) Paul Azinger	271	−13	5 strokes	(United States) Tom Kite	750,000	135,000
1987	(United States) Payne Stewart	264	−20	3 strokes	(South Africa) David Frost	600,000	108,000
1986	(United States) Dan Forsman	202	−11	1 stroke	(United States) Raymond Floyd (United States) Mike Hulbert	500,000	90,000
1985	(United States) Fuzzy Zoeller	275	−9	2 strokes	(United States) Tom Watson	500,000	90,000
Bay Hill Classic
1984	(United States) Gary Koch (2)	272	−12	Playoff	(United States) George Burns	400,000	72,000
1983	(United States) Mike Nicolette	283	−1	Playoff	(Australia) Greg Norman	350,000	63,000
1982	(United States) Tom Kite	278	−6	Playoff	(United States) Jack Nicklaus (Zimbabwe) Denis Watson	300,000	54,000
1981	(United States) Andy Bean	266	−18	7 strokes	(United States) Tom Watson	300,000	54,000
1980	(United States) Dave Eichelberger	279	−5	3 strokes	(United States) Leonard Thompson	300,000	54,000
Bay Hill Citrus Classic
1979	(United States) Bob Byman	278	−6	Playoff	(United States) John Schroeder	250,000	45,000
Florida Citrus Open
1978	(United States) Mac McLendon	271	−17	2 strokes	(Australia) David Graham	200,000	40,000
1977	(United States) Gary Koch	274	−14	2 strokes	(South Africa) Dale Hayes (United States) Joe Inman	200,000	40,000
1976	(United States) Hale Irwin	270	−18	Playoff	(United States) Kermit Zarley	200,000	40,000
1975	(United States) Lee Trevino	276	−12	1 stroke	(United States) Hale Irwin	200,000	40,000
1974	(United States) Jerry Heard (2)	273	−15	3 strokes	(United States) Homero Blancas (United States) Jim Jamieson	150,000	30,000
1973	(United States) Buddy Allin	265	−23	8 strokes	(United States) Charles Coody	150,000	30,000
1972	(United States) Jerry Heard	276	−12	2 strokes	(United States) Bobby Mitchell	150,000	30,000
Florida Citrus Invitational
1971	(United States) Arnold Palmer	270	−18	1 stroke	(United States) Julius Boros	150,000	30,000
1970	(United States) Bob Lunn	271	−17	1 stroke	(United States) Arnold Palmer (Australia) Bob Stanton	150,000	30,000
Florida Citrus Open Invitational
1969	(United States) Ken Still	278	−10	1 stroke	(United States) Miller Barber	115,000	23,000
1968	(United States) Dan Sikes	274	−14	1 stroke	(United States) Tom Weiskopf	115,000	23,000
1967	(United States) Julius Boros	274	−10	1 stroke	(Canada) George Knudson (United States) Arnold Palmer	115,000	23,000
1966	(United States) Lionel Hebert	279	−5	2 strokes	(United States) Charles Coody (United States) Dick Lytle (United States) Jack Nicklaus	110,000	21,000

Note: Green highlight indicates scoring records.

== Multiple winners ==
Eight men have won this tournament more than once through 2024.

- 8 wins
  - Tiger Woods: 2000, 2001, 2002, 2003, 2008, 2009, 2012, 2013
- 2 wins
  - Jerry Heard: 1972, 1974
  - Gary Koch: 1977, 1984
  - Tom Kite: 1982, 1989
  - Loren Roberts: 1994, 1995
  - Ernie Els: 1998, 2010
  - Matt Every: 2014, 2015
  - Scottie Scheffler: 2022, 2024
