= Jerry Heard =

American professional golfer (born 1947)

Personal information
- Full name: Jerry Michael Heard
- Nationality: United States
- Born: May 1, 1947 (age 79) Visalia, California, U.S.
- Height: 6 ft 0 in (1.83 m)
- Weight: 190 lb (86 kg; 14 st)

Career
- Sport: Golf
- College: Fresno State
- Turned professional: 1968
- Former tours: PGA Tour; Champions Tour
- Professional wins: 8

Number of wins by tour
- PGA Tour: 5
- European Tour: 1
- Other: 2

Best results in major championships
- Masters Tournament: T5: 1972
- PGA Championship: T7: 1972
- U.S. Open: T7: 1973
- The Open Championship: T28: 1972

Jerry Michael Heard (born May 1, 1947) is an American professional golfer who won several PGA Tour events in the 1970s.

== Career ==
In 1947, Heard was born in Visalia, California. He attended Fresno State College for a short while.

In 1968, Heard turned professional. In 1969, he joined the PGA Tour after his success at Fall 1968 PGA Tour Qualifying School. His first professional win came in the American Golf Classic at Firestone Country Club in Akron, Ohio in 1971. He finished with a four-day total of 275, three strokes better than runner-up Dale Douglass. In 1972, he won the Florida Citrus Open and the Colonial National Invitation. Heard had nearly 60 top-10 finishes in PGA Tour events in his career including four top-10 finishes in major championships — his best finish in a major was T-5 at the 1972 Masters Tournament. Heard was struck by lightning at the 1975 Western Open, along with playing partner Lee Trevino. Three others were also struck: Bobby Nichols, Jim Ahern, and Tony Jacklin.

In 1980, Heard left the tour and today owns and operates a golf school, the Jerry Heard Golf Academy located at the Silverthorn Country Club in Spring Hill, Florida. His school had been located for many years in southwest Florida.

== Personal life ==
Heard lives near Fort Myers, Florida.

== Professional wins (8) ==
=== PGA Tour wins (5) ===
No.	Date	Tournament	Winning score	To par	Margin of victory	Runner(s)-up
1	Aug 8, 1971	American Golf Classic	67-66-68-74=275	−5	3 strokes	(United States) Dale Douglass
2	Mar 12, 1972	Florida Citrus Open	70-67-70-69=276	−12	2 strokes	(United States) Bobby Mitchell
3	May 14, 1972	Colonial National Invitation	69-66-67-73=275	−5	2 strokes	(United States) Fred Marti
4	Mar 3, 1974	Florida Citrus Open (2)	67-68-69-69=273	−15	3 strokes	(United States) Homero Blancas, (United States) Jim Jamieson
5	May 28, 1978	Atlanta Classic	67-67-68-67=269	−19	2 strokes	(United States) Lou Graham, (United States) Bob Murphy (United States) Tom Watson

PGA Tour playoff record (0–1)

No.	Year	Tournament	Opponent	Result
1	1974	Kemper Open	(United States) Bob Menne	Lost to birdie on first extra hole

=== European Tour wins (1) ===
No.	Date	Tournament	Winning score	To par	Margin of victory	Runner-up
1	Apr 20, 1974	Spanish Open	72-67-70-70=279	−9	6 strokes	(South Africa) Gary Player

=== New Zealand Golf Circuit wins (1) ===
No.	Date	Tournament	Winning score	To par	Margin of victory	Runner-up
1	Nov 21, 1971	Garden City Classic	67-70-68-64=269	−23	5 strokes	(New Zealand) Bob Charles

=== Other wins (1) ===
- 1968 Northern California Open

== Results in major championships ==
Tournament	1966	1967	1968	1969	1970	1971	1972	1973	1974	1975	1976	1977	1978	1979
Masters Tournament						48	T5	56	T11	T26				CUT
U.S. Open	CUT				CUT	T13	T29	T7	T45	T29				CUT
The Open Championship							T28		CUT					
PGA Championship						T9	T7	T66	T48	T25	T22		T64	

Top 10
Did not play

CUT = missed the half-way cut
"T" indicates a tie for a place

=== Summary ===
Tournament	Wins	2nd	3rd	Top-5	Top-10	Top-25	Events	Cuts made
Masters Tournament	0	0	0	1	1	2	6	5
U.S. Open	0	0	0	0	1	2	8	5
The Open Championship	0	0	0	0	0	0	2	1
PGA Championship	0	0	0	0	2	4	7	7
Totals	0	0	0	1	4	8	23	18

- Most consecutive cuts made – 12 (1971 PGA – 1974 U.S. Open)
- Longest streak of top-10s – 1 (four times)

== See also ==
- Fall 1968 PGA Tour Qualifying School graduates
