= 1972 U.S. Open =

1972 U.S. Open may refer to:

- 1972 U.S. Open (golf), a major golf tournament
- 1972 US Open (tennis), a Grand Slam tennis tournament
