= 1976 Open Championship =

Golf tournament in Southport, England

Coordinates: 53.622°N 3.033°W

Tournament information
- Dates: 7–10 July 1976
- Location: Southport, England
- Course: Royal Birkdale Golf Club
- Tours: European Tour; PGA Tour

Statistics
- Par: 72
- Length: 7,001 yards (6,402 m)
- Field: 155 players 84 after 1st cut 66 after 2nd cut
- Cut: 152 (+8) (1st cut); 226 (+10) (2nd cut)
- Prize fund: £75,000 $135,000
- Winner's share: £7,500 $13,500

Champion
- (United States) Johnny Miller
- 279 (−9)

Location in Southport, Merseyside, north of Liverpool, England

The 1976 Open Championship was the 105th Open Championship, played 7–10 July at Royal Birkdale Golf Club in Southport, England. Johnny Miller won his only Open championship, six strokes ahead of runners-up Seve Ballesteros and Jack Nicklaus. It was Miller's second and last major championship title; his first was the U.S. Open in 1973.

Ballesteros, age 19, was the 54-hole leader at 211 (−5), two strokes ahead of Miller. In the final round, he was seven over par after twelve holes, which included a triple-bogey at the eleventh. Ballesteros rallied on the final six holes, with three birdies and an eagle, to tie Nicklaus for second place.

Defending champion Tom Watson carded an 80 (+8) in the third round for 227 (+11) and missed the second cut by a stroke. U.S. Open champion Jerry Pate was level par after two rounds, but also missed the second cut with an 87 for 231. Masters winner Raymond Floyd finished in fourth at 286 (−2), a stroke behind Ballesteros and Nicklaus. The championship is also well remembered for the one and only appearance of Maurice Flitcroft who posed as a professional to gain entry and carded a record 121 for his first round qualifier before being banned by the R&A.

== Round summaries ==
=== First round ===
Wednesday, 7 July 1976

Place	Player	Score	To par
T1	(Spain) Seve Ballesteros	69	−3
T1	(Republic of Ireland) Christy O'Connor Jnr	69	−3
T1	(Japan) Norio Suzuki	69	−3
T4	(Scotland) Brian Barnes	70	−2
T4	(United States) Tom Kite	70	−2
T4	(Australia) Jack Newton	70	−2
T7	(United States) Bill Brask	71	−1
T7	(South Africa) John Fourie	71	−1
T7	(Australia) Graham Marsh	71	−1
T10	(New Zealand) Bob Charles	72	E
T10	(Netherlands) Jan Dorrestein	72	E
T10	(United States) Hubert Green	72	E
T10	(United States) Johnny Miller	72	E
T10	(South Africa) Gary Player	72	E

=== Second round ===
Thursday, 8 July 1976

Place	Player	Score	To par
1	(Spain) Seve Ballesteros	69-69=138	−6
2	(United States) Johnny Miller	72-68=140	−4
T3	(United States) Hubert Green	72-70=142	−2
T3	(Republic of Ireland) Christy O'Connor Jnr	69-73=142	−2
T5	(Scotland) Brian Barnes	70-73=143	−1
T5	(United States) Raymond Floyd	76-67=143	−1
T5	(England) Tommy Horton	74-69=143	−1
T8	(United States) George Burns	75-69=144	E
T8	(United States) Carl Higgins	77-67=144	E
T8	(Wales) Guy Hunt	76-68=144	E
T8	(United States) Tom Kite	70-74=144	E
T8	(Australia) Graham Marsh	71-73=144	E
T8	(Australia) Jack Newton	70-74=144	E
T8	(United States) Jack Nicklaus	74-70=144	E
T8	(United States) Jerry Pate	73-71=144	E
T8	(South Africa) Gary Player	72-72=144	E
T8	(Japan) Norio Suzuki	69-75=144	E

Amateurs: McEvoy (+12), Squires (+12), Powell (+14), Poxon (+14), McNally (+15), McLean (+17), Ridley (+22).

=== Third round ===
Friday, 9 July 1976

Place	Player	Score	To par
1	(Spain) Seve Ballesteros	69-69-73=211	−5
2	(United States) Johnny Miller	72-68-73=213	−3
3	(England) Tommy Horton	74-69-72=215	−1
T4	(Australia) Graham Marsh	71-73-72=216	E
T4	(United States) Jack Nicklaus	74-70-72=216	E
T4	(United States) Raymond Floyd	76-67-73=216	E
T7	(United States) Tom Kite	70-74-73=217	+1
T7	(Republic of Ireland) Christy O'Connor Jnr	69-73-75=217	+1
T9	(South Africa) Bobby Cole	75-71-72=218	+2
T9	(Scotland) Brian Barnes	70-73-75=218	+2

=== Final round ===
Saturday, 10 July 1976

Place	Player	Score	To par	Money (£)
1	(United States) Johnny Miller	72-68-73-66=279	−9	7,500
T2	(United States) Jack Nicklaus	74-70-72-69=285	−3	5,250
T2	(Spain) Seve Ballesteros	69-69-73-74=285	−3	5,250
4	(United States) Raymond Floyd	76-67-73-70=286	−2	3,800
T5	(England) Mark James	76-72-74-66=288	E	2,820
T5	(United States) Hubert Green	72-70-78-68=288	E	2,820
T5	(United States) Tom Kite	70-74-73-71=288	E	2,820
T5	(Republic of Ireland) Christy O'Connor Jnr	69-73-75-71=288	E	2,820
T5	(England) Tommy Horton	74-69-72-73=288	E	2,820
T10	(United States) George Burns	75-69-75-70=289	+1	1,975
T10	(England) Peter Butler	74-72-73-70=289	+1	1,975
T10	(Argentina) Vicente Fernández	79-71-69-70=289	+1	1,975
T10	(Japan) Norio Suzuki	69-75-75-70=289	+1	1,975

- The exchange rate at the time was approximately 1.78 dollars (US) per pound sterling.

==== Scorecard ====
Final round

Hole	1	2	3	4	5	6	7	8	9	10	11	12	13	14	15	16	17	18
Par	4	4	4	3	4	4	3	4	4	4	4	3	5	3	5	4	5	5
(United States) Miller	−2	−3	−3	−3	−3	−3	−3	−4	−4	−4	−4	−5	−7	−7	−7	−7	−8	−9
(Spain) Ballesteros	−5	−4	−4	−4	−4	−2	−2	−1	−1	−2	+1	+2	+1	E	E	E	−2	−3
(United States) Nicklaus	E	E	−1	−2	−2	E	E	E	E	E	E	+1	E	−1	−1	−1	−2	−3
(United States) Floyd	E	E	E	-1	-2	-1	−1	−1	-1	−1	−1	E	−1	−1	−1	−1	−1	−2

Cumulative tournament scores, relative to par

Eagle	Birdie	Bogey	Double bogey	Triple bogey+
