= 1972 PGA Tour =

Golf tour season

1972 PGA Tour season
- Duration: January 6, 1972 – December 3, 1972
- Number of official events: 47 (Note: One further tournament was scheduled but was cancelled.)
- Most wins: (United States) Jack Nicklaus (7)
- Money list: (United States) Jack Nicklaus
- PGA Player of the Year: (United States) Jack Nicklaus

The 1972 PGA Tour was the 57th season of the PGA Tour, the main professional golf tour in the United States. It was also the fourth season since separating from the PGA of America.

== Rogelio Gonzales suspension ==
At the Greater New Orleans Open, Colombian rookie, Rogelio Gonzales was disqualified after it was learned that he had changed his scorecard earlier in the tournament. In addition to his disqualification, the PGA Tour lifted Gonzales playing privileges.

== Schedule ==
The following table lists official events during the 1972 season.

Date	Tournament	Location	Purse (US$)	Winner(s) (Note: The number in parentheses after each winner's name is the number of PGA Tour events they had won up to and including that tournament. This information is only shown for PGA Tour members.)	Notes
Jan 9	Glen Campbell-Los Angeles Open	California	125,000	(United States) George Archer (10)	
Jan 16	Bing Crosby National Pro-Am	California	140,000	(United States) Jack Nicklaus (39)	Pro-Am
Jan 24	Dean Martin Tucson Open	Arizona	150,000	(United States) Miller Barber (7)	
Jan 30	Andy Williams-San Diego Open Invitational	California	150,000	(United States) Paul Harney (6)	
Feb 6	Hawaiian Open	Hawaii	200,000	(United States) Grier Jones (1)	
Feb 13	Bob Hope Desert Classic	California	145,000	(United States) Bob Rosburg (6)	Pro-Am
Feb 20	Phoenix Open	Arizona	125,000	(United States) Homero Blancas (3)	
Feb 27	Jackie Gleason's Inverrary Classic	Florida	260,000	(United States) Tom Weiskopf (5)	New tournament
Mar 5	Doral-Eastern Open	Florida	150,000	(United States) Jack Nicklaus (40)	
Mar 12	Florida Citrus Open	Florida	150,000	(United States) Jerry Heard (2)	
Mar 19	Greater Jacksonville Open	Florida	125,000	(England) Tony Jacklin (4)	
Mar 26	Greater New Orleans Open	Louisiana	125,000	(South Africa) Gary Player (16)	
Apr 2	Greater Greensboro Open	North Carolina	200,000	(United States) George Archer (11)	
Apr 9	Masters Tournament	Georgia	204,649	(United States) Jack Nicklaus (41)	Major championship
Apr 9	Magnolia Classic	Mississippi	35,000	(United States) Mike Morley (n/a)	Second Tour (Note: Official money; unofficial win.)
Apr 16	Monsanto Open	Florida	150,000	(United States) Dave Hill (9)	
Apr 23	Tournament of Champions	California	165,000	(United States) Bobby Mitchell (2)	Winners-only event
Apr 23	Tallahassee Open	Florida	75,000	(Australia) Bob Shaw (1)	Alternate event
Apr 30	Byron Nelson Golf Classic	Texas	125,000	(United States) Chi-Chi Rodríguez (6)	
May 7	Houston Open	Texas	125,000	(Australia) Bruce Devlin (7)	
May 7	Shreveport Classic	Louisiana	25,000	(United States) Don Iverson (n/a)	Second Tour
May 14	Colonial National Invitation	Texas	125,000	(United States) Jerry Heard (3)	Invitational
May 14	Maumelle Open	Arkansas	25,000	(United States) Ed Sneed (n/a)	Second Tour
May 21	Danny Thomas Memphis Classic	Tennessee	175,000	(United States) Lee Trevino (12)	
May 28	Atlanta Classic	Georgia	130,000	(United States) Bob Lunn (6)	
Jun 4	Kemper Open	North Carolina	175,000	(United States) Doug Sanders (20)	
Jun 11	IVB-Philadelphia Golf Classic	Pennsylvania	150,000	(United States) J. C. Snead (3)	
Jun 18	U.S. Open	California	200,000	(United States) Jack Nicklaus (42)	Major championship
Jun 25	Western Open	Illinois	150,000	(United States) Jim Jamieson (1)	
Jul 3	Cleveland Open	Ohio	150,000	(Australia) David Graham (1)	
Jul 9	Canadian Open	Canada	150,000	(United States) Gay Brewer (10)	
Jul 15	The Open Championship	Scotland	£50,000	(United States) Lee Trevino (13)	Major championship (Note: Unofficial money event at the time, but retrospectively counted as an official win.)
Jul 16	Greater Milwaukee Open	Wisconsin	125,000	(United States) Jim Colbert (2)	Alternate event
Jul 23	American Golf Classic	Ohio	150,000	(United States) Bert Yancey (7)	
Jul 30	National Team Championship	Pennsylvania	200,000	(United States) Babe Hiskey (3) and (United States) Kermit Zarley (3)	Team event
Jul 30	Vern Parsell Buick Open	Michigan	20,000	(United States) Gary Groh (n/a)	Second Tour
Aug 6	PGA Championship	Michigan	225,000	(South Africa) Gary Player (17)	Major championship
Aug 13	Westchester Classic	New York	250,000	(United States) Jack Nicklaus (43)	
Aug 20	USI Classic	Massachusetts	200,000	(Australia) Bruce Devlin (8)	
Aug 27	U.S. Professional Match Play Championship	North Carolina	200,000	(United States) Jack Nicklaus (44)	Limited-field event
Aug 27	Liggett & Myers Open	North Carolina	100,000	(United States) Lou Graham (2)	New tournament Alternate event
Sep 4	Greater Hartford Open Invitational	Connecticut	125,000	(United States) Lee Trevino (14)	
Sep 10	Southern Open	Georgia	100,000	(United States) DeWitt Weaver (2)	
Sep 17	Greater St. Louis Golf Classic	Missouri	150,000	(United States) Lee Trevino (15)	New tournament
Sep 24	Robinson's Fall Golf Classic	Illinois	100,000	(United States) Grier Jones (2)	
Oct 1	Quad Cities Open	Iowa	100,000	(United States) Deane Beman (3)	
Oct 22	Kaiser International Open Invitational	California	150,000	(Canada) George Knudson (7)	
Oct 29	Sahara Invitational	Nevada	135,000	(United States) Lanny Wadkins (1)	
Nov 5	San Antonio Texas Open	Texas	125,000	(United States) Mike Hill (2)	
Nov 27	Sea Pines Heritage Classic	South Carolina	125,000	(United States) Johnny Miller (2)	Invitational
Dec 3	Walt Disney World Open Invitational	Florida	150,000	(United States) Jack Nicklaus (45)	
~~Dec 10~~	Bahamas National Open	Bahamas	–	Cancelled	

=== Unofficial events ===
The following events were sanctioned by the PGA Tour, but did not carry official money, nor were wins official.

Date	Tournament	Location	Purse ($)	Winner(s)	Notes
Nov 12	World Cup	Australia	6,300	(Taiwan) Hsieh Min-Nan and (Taiwan) Lu Liang-Huan	Team event
Nov 12	World Cup Individual Trophy	Australia	6,300	(Taiwan) Hsieh Min-Nan	

== Money list ==
The money list was based on prize money won during the season, calculated in U.S. dollars.

Position	Player	Prize money ($)
1	(United States) Jack Nicklaus	320,542
2	(United States) Lee Trevino	214,805
3	(United States) George Archer	145,027
4	(United States) Grier Jones	140,177
5	(United States) Jerry Heard	137,198
6	(United States) Tom Weiskopf	129,422
7	(South Africa) Gary Player	120,719
8	(Australia) Bruce Devlin	119,768
9	(United States) Tommy Aaron	118,924
10	(United States) Lanny Wadkins	116,616

== Awards ==
Award	Winner	Ref.
PGA Player of the Year	(United States) Jack Nicklaus	
Scoring leader (Vardon Trophy)	(United States) Lee Trevino	
