= Robinson Open =

Golf tournament formerly on the PGA Tour

Shrine-Robinson Open Golf Classic
Tournament information
- Location: Robinson, Illinois
- Established: 1968
- Course: Crawford County Country Club
- Par: 71
- Tour: PGA Tour
- Format: Stroke play
- Prize fund: US$125,000
- Month played: July
- Final year: 1973

Tournament record score
- Aggregate: 268 George Knudson (1970)
- To par: −18 Dean Refram (1968)

Final champion
- (United States) Deane Beman
- Location in United States Location in Illinois

The Robinson Open was a golf tournament on the PGA Tour from 1968 to 1973. It was played at the Crawford County Country Club in Robinson, Illinois.

== Winners ==
Year	Winner	Score	To par	Margin of victory	Runner(s)-up
Shrine-Robinson Open Golf Classic
1973	(United States) Deane Beman	271	−13	1 stroke	(United States) Bob Dickson (United States) Bunky Henry
Robinson's Fall Golf Classic
1972	(United States) Grier Jones	273	−11	Playoff	(United States) Dave Marad
Robinson Open Golf Classic
1971	(United States) Labron Harris Jr.	274	−10	Playoff	(United States) Bert Yancey
1970	(Canada) George Knudson	268	−16	Playoff	(United States) George Archer
1969	(United States) Bob Goalby	273	−15	Playoff	(United States) Jim Wiechers
Robinson Open
1968	(United States) Dean Refram	270	−18	5 strokes	(United States) Mike Hill
