= Tommy Aaron =

American professional golfer (born 1937)

Personal information
- Full name: Thomas Dean Aaron
- Nationality: United States
- Born: February 22, 1937 (age 89) Gainesville, Georgia, U.S.
- Height: 6 ft 1 in (1.85 m)
- Weight: 180 lb (82 kg; 13 st)

Career
- Sport: Golf
- College: University of Florida
- Turned professional: 1960
- Former tours: PGA Tour; Champions Tour
- Professional wins: 9

Number of wins by tour
- PGA Tour: 2
- PGA Tour Champions: 1
- Other: 6

Best results in major championships (wins: 1)
- Masters Tournament: Won: 1973
- PGA Championship: T2: 1972
- U.S. Open: T29: 1975
- The Open Championship: T50: 1970
- U.S. Amateur: 2nd: 1958
- British Amateur: R256: 1959

Achievements and awards
- Senior PGA Tour Comeback Player of the Year: 1992

Thomas Dean Aaron (born February 22, 1937) is an American former professional golfer. He was a member of the PGA Tour during the 1960s, 1970s and 1980s. Aaron is best known for winning the 1973 Masters Tournament. He is also known for an error in the 1968 Masters Tournament, when he entered a 4 instead of a 3 on Roberto De Vicenzo's scorecard, which prevented De Vicenzo from competing in a playoff.

== Early life ==
Thomas Dean Aaron was born on February 22, 1937, in Gainesville, Georgia. He began playing golf at age 12. He won two Georgia Amateur titles, two Southeastern Amateur events, and two Georgia Open crowns in his youth.

== Amateur career ==
Aaron attended the University of Florida where he was a member of the Kappa Alpha Order fraternity (Beta Zeta chapter). While he was a Florida student, he played for the Florida Gators men's golf team from 1956 to 1959, was a member of the Gators' 1956 Southeastern Conference (SEC) championship team, and won the individual SEC championship in 1957 and 1958. He lost the U.S. Amateur final to Charles Coe in 1958, was a member of the 1959 Walker Cup team, and won the Western Amateur in 1960. He was recognized as an All-American in 1958 and 1959. Aaron graduated from the University of Florida with a bachelor's degree in business administration in 1960.

== Professional career ==
In 1960, Aaron turned pro. His first professional victory came at the 1969 Canadian Open. Although the event is historically considered a PGA Tour event, it was not that year. The following year he gained his first PGA Tour victory at the Atlanta Classic. In 1972, he won the Trophée Lancôme in France. Aaron's best money year was 1972, when he finished in ninth place on the PGA Tour money list.

Aaron won the Masters Tournament in 1973, which was his one major championship. He also finished in the top ten at the Masters from 1967 to 1970. His only other top ten major championship finishes came at the PGA Championship in 1965 and 1972. In 2000, he made the cut at the Masters at the age of 63, breaking a record previously held by Gary Player.

Aaron played for the U.S. team in the Ryder Cup in 1969 and 1973, and had a record of one win, one tie and four losses.

In the 1980s and 1990s, Aaron played on the Senior PGA Tour, winning $3,646,302. The 1992 Kaanapali Classic was his last professional win.

Aaron is also known for being the playing partner of Argentinian Roberto De Vicenzo for the final round of the 1968 Masters Tournament. On the seventeenth hole, Aaron incorrectly recorded a par 4 on De Vicenzo's scorecard, when his partner had actually scored a birdie 3 for the hole. Because De Vicenzo signed the scorecard without correcting the error, PGA rules required him to stand by the incorrect, higher score. Instead of a De Vicenzo–Bob Goalby playoff for the green jacket, Goalby won the tournament outright due to the technicality.

Ironically, Aaron's 4th round playing partner at the 1973 Masters, Johnny Miller, recorded a higher score when keeping Aaron's card. Aaron caught the mistake.

== Awards and honors ==
- In 1969, Aaron was inducted into the University of Florida Athletic Hall of Fame as a "Gator Great."
- In 1980, he was inducted into the Georgia Sports Hall of Fame.
- In 1989, Aaron was inducted into the Georgia Golf Hall of Fame.
- In 1992, Aaron earned the Senior PGA Tour Comeback Player of the Year award

== Amateur wins ==
- 1957 SEC Championship (individual), Georgia Amateur
- 1958 SEC Championship (individual), Southeastern Amateur
- 1959 Sunnehanna Amateur
- 1960 Western Amateur, Georgia Amateur, Southeastern Amateur

== Professional wins (9) ==
=== PGA Tour wins (2) ===
Legend
Major championships (1)
Other PGA Tour (1)

No.	Date	Tournament	Winning score	Margin of victory	Runner-up
1	May 24, 1970	Atlanta Classic	−13 (68-68-70-69=275)	3 strokes	(United States) Dan Sikes
2	Apr 9, 1973	Masters Tournament	−5 (68-73-74-68=283)	1 stroke	(United States) J. C. Snead

PGA Tour playoff record (0–4)

No.	Year	Tournament	Opponent(s)	Result
1	1963	Memphis Open Invitational	(United States) Tony Lema	Lost to par on first extra hole
2	1963	Cleveland Open Invitational	(United States) Tony Lema, (United States) Arnold Palmer	Palmer won 18-hole playoff; Palmer: −4 (67), Aaron: −1 (70), Lema: −1 (70)
3	1972	Glen Campbell-Los Angeles Open	(United States) George Archer, (United States) Dave Hill	Archer won 18-hole playoff; Archer: −5 (66), Aaron: −3 (68), Hill: −3 (68)
4	1972	Greater Greensboro Open	(United States) George Archer	Lost to par on second extra hole

=== Other wins (6) ===
- 1957 Georgia Open (as an amateur)
- 1960 Georgia Open
- 1969 Canadian Open
- 1972 Trophée Lancôme, ABC Japan vs USA Golf Matches
- 1975 Georgia Open

=== Senior PGA Tour wins (1) ===
No.	Date	Tournament	Winning score	Margin of victory	Runner-up
1	Nov 1, 1992	Kaanapali Classic	−15 (67-67-64=198)	1 stroke	(United States) Dave Stockton

Senior PGA Tour playoff record (0–2)

No.	Year	Tournament	Opponent(s)	Result
1	1992	Vintage ARCO Invitational	(United States) Jim Colbert, (United States) Mike Hill	Hill won with birdie on first extra hole
2	1992	Murata Reunion Pro-Am	(United States) George Archer	Lost to birdie on third extra hole

== Major championships ==
=== Wins (1) ===
Year	Championship	54 holes	Winning score	Margin	Runner-up
1973	Masters Tournament	4-shot deficit	−5 (68-73-74-68=283)	1 stroke	(United States) J. C. Snead

=== Results timeline ===
Amateur

Tournament	1958	1959	1960
Masters Tournament		CUT	T25
U.S. Open			
The Open Championship			
U.S. Amateur	2	R16	R64
The Amateur Championship		R256	

Professional

Tournament	1961	1962	1963	1964	1965	1966	1967	1968	1969
Masters Tournament					T11	T13	T8	T7	T8
U.S. Open						T30			T40
The Open Championship									
PGA Championship				T21	T8	T22	T20	T26	T57

Tournament	1970	1971	1972	1973	1974	1975	1976	1977	1978	1979
Masters Tournament	T5	T22	CUT	1	CUT	T38	42	T35	36	T28
U.S. Open	T46		T55	T45	CUT	T29	T47			
The Open Championship	T50			CUT						
PGA Championship	T45	CUT	T2	T44	T55	CUT	T38	CUT		T46

Tournament	1980	1981	1982	1983	1984	1985	1986	1987	1988	1989
The Masters	CUT	48	T36	CUT	CUT	CUT	CUT	T50	CUT	T38
U.S. Open										
The Open Championship										
PGA Championship										

Tournament	1990	1991	1992	1993	1994	1995	1996	1997	1998	1999
Masters Tournament	CUT	T49	T54	CUT	CUT		CUT	CUT	CUT	CUT
U.S. Open										
The Open Championship										
PGA Championship										

Tournament	2000	2001	2002	2003	2004	2005
Masters Tournament	57	CUT	CUT	CUT	CUT	CUT
U.S. Open						
The Open Championship						
PGA Championship						

Win
Top 10
Did not play

CUT = missed the halfway cut
WD = withdrew
R256, R128, R64, R32, R16, QF, SF = Round in which player lost in match play
"T" indicates a tie for a place.

Source for The Masters: www.masters.com

Source for U.S. Open and U.S. Amateur: USGA Championship Database

Source for The British Open: www.opengolf.com

Source for PGA Championship: PGA Championship Media Guide

Source for 1959 British Amateur: The Glasgow Herald, May 26, 1959, p. 6.

== Results in senior majors ==
Results may not be in chronological order

Tournament	1987	1988	1989
Senior PGA Championship		T13	T27
U.S. Senior Open	T19	T32	
The Tradition	NYF	NYF	T22
Senior Players Championship	T45	T54	

Tournament	1990	1991	1992	1993	1994	1995	1996	1997	1998	1999
Senior PGA Championship	T55	T31	T39	73	T15	CUT	T25		CUT	WD
U.S. Senior Open	CUT	T29	T49	T13	T45	T29	T51	CUT		CUT
The Tradition	T55	T12	4	T17	T41	T52	T50	61		
Senior Players Championship	T33	T52	T5	T33	T32	T23	T24	76	T73	T48

Tournament	2000	2001	2002	2003	2004	2005	2006
Senior PGA Championship		CUT	CUT	T67	DQ	CUT	CUT
Senior British Open Championship	–	–	–				
U.S. Senior Open							
The Tradition							
Senior Players Championship	T69						

Note: The Senior British Open Championship did not become a major until 2003.

Top 10
Did not play

NYF = tournament not yet founded
CUT = missed the halfway cut
WD = withdrew
"T" indicates a tie for a place

== U.S. national team appearances ==
Amateur

- Walker Cup: 1959 (winners)

Professional

- Ryder Cup: 1969 (tie, cup retained), 1973 (winners)

== See also ==
- List of American Ryder Cup golfers
- List of Kappa Alpha Order members
- List of Florida Gators men's golfers on the PGA Tour
- List of University of Florida alumni
- List of University of Florida Athletic Hall of Fame members
