= Fall 1968 PGA Tour Qualifying School graduates =

This is a list of the Fall 1968 PGA Tour Qualifying School graduates.

The tournament was played over 144 holes at the PGA National Golf Club in Palm Beach Gardens, Florida in early October. There were 79 players in the field and 30 earned their tour card. Grier Jones was the medallist.

#	Player	Notes
1	(United States) Grier Jones	Winner of 1968 NCAA Championship
2	(United States) Jimmy Day	
3	(England) Malcolm Gregson	Winner of 1967 British PGA Championship
4	(United States) Don Iverson	
T5	(United States) Gene Ferrell	
T5	(United States) Nathaniel Sparks	
7	(United States) George Johnson	
T8	(United States) Jerry Heard	Winner of 1968 Northern California Open
T8	(United States) Jim Jamieson	
T8	(United States) William Tindall	
11	(United States) Jim Awtrey	
T12	(United States) John Levinson	
T12	(Canada) Lawrence O'Hearn	
T14	(United States) Jim Bullard	
T14	(United States) Vern Novak Jr.	
T14	(United States) Robert Joe Payne	
T14	(United States) Jeff Voss	
T18	(United States) Ras Allen	
T18	(United States) Tom Bailey	
T18	(United States) Kenneth Ellsworth	
T18	(United States) Jim Hardy	
T18	(United States) Roland LaMontage	
T18	(United States) Dennis Lyons	
24	(United States) Ed Sneed	
T25	(United States) David Bollman	
T25	(United States) Clayton Cole	
T25	(United States) George Hixon	
T28	(United States) Guy Bill	
T28	(United States) Joseph McDermott	
T28	(United States) James Walker Jr.	
