= Dean Refram =

American golfer and golf course architect

Personal information
- Nationality: United States
- Born: November 8, 1936 Miami, Florida, U.S.
- Died: July 28, 1991 (aged 54) Tampa, Florida, U.S.

Career
- Sport: Golf
- College: Florida Southern College
- Status: Professional
- Former tour: PGA Tour
- Professional wins: 2

Number of wins by tour
- PGA Tour: 1
- Other: 1

Best results in major championships
- Masters Tournament: T30: 1964
- PGA Championship: 72nd: 1979
- U.S. Open: T13: 1969
- The Open Championship: DNP

Dean Refram (November 8, 1936 – July 28, 1991) was an American professional golfer and golf course architect.

== Early life and amateur career ==
Refram was born in Miami, Florida. He attended Florida Southern College in Lakeland, Florida, and was a member of the golf team.

== Professional career ==
Refram played on the PGA Tour in the 1960s and 1970s. He won twice on tour: the 1968 Robinson Open and the 1975 Walt Disney World National Team Championship with Jim Colbert.

After leaving the Tour in 1975, Refram spent the latter part of his career as a golf course designer and architect. Most of the courses he designed were in Florida.

== Personal life ==
Refram died in Tampa, Florida at age 54 of respiratory problems complicated by cancer. His son, Dean Refram Jr., also is a professional golfer.

== Professional wins (2) ==
=== PGA Tour wins (1) ===
No.	Date	Tournament	Winning score	Margin of victory	Runner(s)-up
1	Oct 26, 1975	Walt Disney World National Team Championship (with (United States) Jim Colbert)	−36 (63-63-62-64=252)	3 strokes	(South Africa) Bobby Cole and (United States) John Schlee, (Mexico) Victor Regalado and (United States) Charlie Sifford

=== Other wins (1) ===
- 1968 Robinson Open

== Results in major championships ==
Tournament	1962	1963	1964	1965	1966	1967	1968	1969
Masters Tournament			T30					
U.S. Open	T28	T14	CUT	T28				T13
PGA Championship								

Tournament	1970	1971	1972	1973	1974	1975	1976	1977	1978	1979	1980
Masters Tournament	48						CUT				
U.S. Open	T36			CUT			CUT				
PGA Championship										72	CUT

Note: Refram never played in The Open Championship.

Did not play

CUT = missed the half-way cut
"T" indicates a tie for a place
