= Johnny Miller =

American former professional golfer (born 1947)

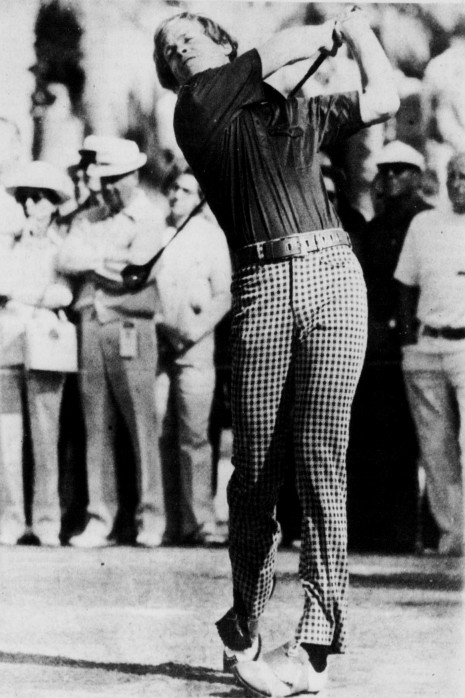
- Miller in 1975

Personal information
- Full name: John Laurence Miller
- Nationality: United States
- Born: April 29, 1947 (age 79) San Francisco, California, U.S.
- Height: 6 ft 2 in (1.88 m)
- Weight: 205 lb (93 kg; 14.6 st)
- Spouse: Linda Miller
- Children: 6

Career
- Sport: Golf
- College: Brigham Young University
- Turned professional: 1969
- Former tour: PGA Tour
- Professional wins: 36

Number of wins by tour
- PGA Tour: 25
- European Tour: 2
- Japan Golf Tour: 1
- Other: 10

Best results in major championships (wins: 2)
- Masters Tournament: T2: 1971, 1975, 1981
- PGA Championship: T11: 1977
- U.S. Open: Won: 1973
- The Open Championship: Won: 1976

Achievements and awards
- World Golf Hall of Fame: 1998 (member page)
- PGA Tour money list winner: 1974
- PGA Player of the Year: 1974
- Bob Jones Award: 2023

John Laurence Miller (born April 29, 1947) is an American former professional golfer, one of the top players in the world during the mid-1970s. He was the first to shoot 63 in a major championship to win the 1973 U.S. Open, and he ranked second in the world on Mark McCormack's world golf rankings in both 1974 and 1975 behind Jack Nicklaus. Miller won 25 PGA Tour events, including two majors, and was inducted into the World Golf Hall of Fame in 1998. He was the lead golf analyst for NBC Sports for 29 years (January 1990 to February 2019), and is also an active golf course architect.

== Early life and amateur career ==
Born and raised in San Francisco, California, Miller was invited to join the Olympic Club in 1963 as a Junior Golf Section member, and became the top player on its junior team. He won the San Francisco city junior title in 1963 at age 16, and the following year won the 1964 U.S. Junior Amateur. After graduation from Abraham Lincoln High School in 1965, he enrolled at Brigham Young University in Provo, Utah.

In the spring of his freshman year of college, Miller qualified for the 1966 U.S. Open at the Olympic Club. His intimate knowledge of his home course helped him to finish in a tie for eighth place, the low amateur by three strokes, and earned him an invitation to the 1967 Masters. He won the California State Amateur Championship in 1968.

Miller was an All-American at BYU and graduated in 1969 with a degree in physical education.

== Professional career ==
Miller joined the PGA Tour in 1969 at age 22, and won his first tour event in 1971. During his professional career, Miller won two major titles: the 1973 U.S. Open and the 1976 Open Championship.

Coming into the 1973 U.S. Open at the challenging par-71 Oakmont, Miller was a 26-year-old with just two tour victories in four years, but had done well in several majors. He tied for second at the 1971 Masters, and had top-10 finishes at the U.S. Open in 1971 and 1972. Miller had yet to win in 1973, but by mid-June, he had recorded eight top-10 finishes, which included a tie for 6th at the 1973 Masters.

Miller played the first two rounds at Oakmont Country Club with Arnold Palmer and his "Army" gallery, at its largest in Palmer's native western Pennsylvania. Miller was two under par (140) after the second round but shot a five-over 76 on Saturday to settle at three-over (216) for the championship. Miller played the front nine without his yardage book on Saturday until his wife Linda retrieved it.

Miller began the fourth and final round in 12th place, six shots behind the four co-leaders, including Palmer. Teeing off at 1:36 pm, about an hour ahead of the final group, Miller shot a scorching eight-under 63, considered one of the most remarkable rounds in major championship history. He passed the leading players of the day, including Jack Nicklaus, Gary Player, Lee Trevino, and Palmer, who was in the final pairing with John Schlee. Miller's 63 was the lowest round in the history of a major championship. It was tied several times but remained a record until Branden Grace shot a 62 at the 2017 Open Championship.

Miller birdied the first four holes and hit all 18 greens in regulation. He got five more birdies with only one bogey (a 3-putt on the 244 yard par-3 #8), and needed only 29 putts during the round. Ten of his approach shots finished within 10 feet of the cup. In 2007, Miller said: "It was the greatest ball-striking round I've ever seen and I've been around a little bit." Miller wound up at 5-under (279) for the championship, beating the runner-up Schlee by a single stroke, who shot a 1-under 70. Only six players, Miller included, shot under par in the final round. Miller earned $35,000 for the victory.

Miller followed that triumph at Oakmont by finishing in a tie for second at the next major, The Open Championship at Royal Troon a month later, three strokes behind winner Tom Weiskopf. This was the first of five consecutive top-10 finishes for Miller at The Open. In 1974, Miller was the leading money winner on the PGA Tour with eight victories, which considerably outpaced the rest of the field. He amassed a then-record $353,201 (not exceeded until 1978), and unseated Nicklaus as the Tour's leading money winner for a season.

Miller began 1975 with three more victories, winning two of them in remarkable fashion. He won the Phoenix Open by 14 strokes, which included a second-round 61 for a 24-under par cumulative score of 260, the lowest on the tour in 20 years. He also won the Tucson Open by nine strokes, with a final round 61. Miller later said of his peak period in the mid-1970s: "When I won at Tucson by nine shots in 1975, I would say the average iron shot I hit that week was no more than two feet off line. It was unbelievable. When I was at my peak, I would go into streaks where I felt that I could knock down the pin from anywhere with my irons. I played some golf that I think is unequaled."

Miller finished second to Jack Nicklaus at the 1975 Masters and third at 1975 Open Championship later in the year at Carnoustie. He won his second major at the 1976 Open Championship, a six stroke victory over Nicklaus and a 19-year-old Seve Ballesteros at Royal Birkdale. The course had played hard and fast after scorching hot conditions in England that summer, during the 1976 United Kingdom heat wave, which saw record hot temperatures and several minor fires breaking out in the tournament. Miller's final round of 66 at Royal Birkdale tied the course record.

Following his 1976 Open Championship win, Miller, never known as an outstanding putter, lost the form that made him a frequent winner in his early career and failed to win for the next three years, due to a putting affliction widely known as the "yips".

Miller later said that he considered quitting professional golf during his slump in form between 1977 and 1979, but a passage in the Scriptures, "It's not what you accomplish in life, but what you overcome", helped inspire him to continue playing golf. Miller also said that Jack Nicklaus, whom he viewed as a father figure, was "amazingly supportive" of him during his bleak period in the late 1970s.

In 1980, Miller notched his first win in almost four years, the Jackie Gleason-Inverrary Classic. In 1981, Miller enjoyed one final spectacular season. His victory at the Million Dollar Challenge in Sun City, South Africa following a 9-hole sudden-death playoff with Seve Ballesteros made him that year's leading worldwide money winner after two earlier wins in the United States. Miller's return to impressive form in 1981 resulted in him competing in his second Ryder Cup. Until 2021, the 1981 Ryder Cup at Walton Heath Golf Club in England was the heaviest defeat that a European team had suffered at the hands of the United States, and it is considered by many to be the finest American team ever assembled.

Miller's final PGA Tour victory came in semiretirement at the 1994 AT&T Pebble Beach National Pro-Am, at age 46. He finished his career with 25 PGA Tour wins and 105 top-10 finishes. Miller finished runner-up three times at The Masters in 1971, 1975 and 1981. He played on two Ryder Cup teams, 1975 and 1981. He was inducted into the World Golf Hall of Fame in 1998.

Fred Couples referred to Miller as "probably the best ball-striker ever". Jack Nicklaus described Miller as "the best short iron player ever."

=== Broadcasting career ===
In 1990, Miller began work as a broadcaster for NBC Sports. Although Miller became eligible for the Senior PGA Tour in 1997, he decided to forgo regular play on the senior tour in part due to the strain the sport puts on the knees of a player. He remained as lead analyst for NBC Sports' limited golf schedule and pursued other business ventures. Miller typically was paired with broadcaster Dan Hicks and called numerous events including the U.S. Open, U.S. Amateur, and Ryder Cup.

As a commentator, Miller became known for his straightforward and sometimes blunt remarks, which sometimes earned him the enmity of players. One example came on June 16, 2008, when he referred to Rocco Mediate during the broadcast of the U.S. Open's 18-hole playoff as "looking like the guy who cleans Tiger Woods' pool." Miller said that "guys with the name of Rocco don't get on the trophy, do they?" Mediate, who has battled many physical problems throughout his career, nevertheless played superbly, and took the heavily favored Woods to an 18-hole playoff (and one extra sudden-death hole). Mediate later laughed off the remarks and Miller later apologized for his comments, saying: "I chose my words poorly and in the future will be more careful." He added that his intention was to "convey my affection and admiration for Rocco's everyman qualities and had absolutely nothing to do with his heritage."

In 2012, Miller revealed that Tiger Woods once asked him to be his coach. Miller said that he declined the offer from Woods because of his commitment to NBC Sports and a desire to spend time with his children and grandchildren.

Miller has written a column for Golf Digest magazine for several years, offering insight into various aspects of golf, often featuring the professional game. He also wrote the book I Call The Shots, a look at the PGA Tour's personalities during his peak years, the Tour's current stars, as well as broadcasting insights. Known for his very weak grip, with both "Vs" formed by the forefinger and thumb of each hand pointing to his chin, he sought to eliminate the left side of the golf course as an area for missed shots.

An offshoot to his broadcasting career has been a string of film and TV appearances as himself in the role of "beloved golf great". In the 1996 film The Associate with Whoopi Goldberg, an aging billionaire is willing to transfer management of all his assets in exchange for the opportunity to play a round of golf with Johnny Miller.

Miller is a partner in a limited partnership which purchased Silverado Country Club in Napa, California on July 1, 2010. He also owns a golf design company and a golf academy and designed the Thanksgiving Point Golf Course in Lehi, Utah, host of the Champion's Challenge. Although Miller has helped design 34 golf courses, Silverado was the first course he redesigned himself. In July 2013, it was announced that Silverado would again host a PGA Tour event starting in October 2014, the Frys.com Open. The renovation added over 300 yards (270 m), removed trees, and repositioned bunkers. Miller served as the unofficial face of the resort during the event, as he was a part of the telecast, which frequently referenced his role in the club. When he had to fulfill official club duties during the week, Miller's friend and NBC colleague Roger Maltbie filled in for him.

Miller retired from broadcasting following the third round of the 2019 Phoenix Open, an event he won in consecutive years (1974, 1975).

== Personal life ==
Miller is a member of the Church of Jesus Christ of Latter-day Saints. He and his wife Linda have six children and live on the Monterey Peninsula in California and Mount Olympus, Utah. During the 2018 Ryder Cup broadcast, he announced that his 25th grandchild was born. His son Andy won a Buy.com Tour event and played on the PGA Tour.

== Awards and honors ==
- In 1974, Miller won the PGA Tour money list
- In 1974, Miller won the PGA Player of the Year
- In 1998, Miller was inducted into the World Golf Hall of Fame.
- In 2023, Miller received the Bob Jones Award from the USGA.

== Professional wins (36) ==
=== PGA Tour wins (25) ===
Legend
Major championships (2)
Other PGA Tour (23)

No.	Date	Tournament	Winning score	Margin of victory	Runner(s)-up
1	Sep 12, 1971	Southern Open Invitational	−13 (65-67-68-67=267)	5 strokes	(United States) Deane Beman
2	Nov 27, 1972	Sea Pines Heritage Classic	−3 (71-65-75-70=281)	1 stroke	(United States) Tom Weiskopf
3	Jun 17, 1973	U.S. Open	−5 (71-69-76-63=279)	1 stroke	(United States) John Schlee
4	Jan 6, 1974	Bing Crosby National Pro-Am	−8 (68-70-70=208) (Note: Shortened to 54 holes due to weather.)	4 strokes	(United States) Grier Jones
5	Jan 13, 1974	Phoenix Open	−13 (69-69-66-67=271)	1 stroke	(United States) Lanny Wadkins
6	Jan 20, 1974	Dean Martin Tucson Open	−16 (62-71-71-68=272)	3 strokes	(United States) Ben Crenshaw
7	Mar 31, 1974	Sea Pines Heritage Classic (2)	−8 (67-67-72-70=276)	3 strokes	(United States) Gibby Gilbert
8	Apr 28, 1974	Tournament of Champions	−8 (75-69-67-69=280)	1 stroke	(United States) Buddy Allin, (United States) John Mahaffey
9	Aug 25, 1974	Westchester Classic	−19 (69-68-65-67=269)	2 strokes	(United States) Don Bies
10	Sep 15, 1974	World Open Golf Championship	−3 (73-63-73-72=281)	Playoff	(United States) Frank Beard, (United States) Bob Murphy, (United States) Jack Nicklaus
11	Sep 29, 1974	Kaiser International Open Invitational	−17 (69-69-67-66=271)	8 strokes	(United States) Billy Casper, (United States) Lee Trevino
12	Jan 12, 1975	Phoenix Open (2)	−24 (67-61-68-64=260)	14 strokes	(United States) Jerry Heard
13	Jan 19, 1975	Dean Martin Tucson Open (2)	−25 (66-69-67-61=263)	9 strokes	(United States) John Mahaffey
14	Feb 9, 1975	Bob Hope Desert Classic	−21 (64-69-72-66-68=339)	3 strokes	(United States) Bob Murphy
15	Oct 5, 1975	Kaiser International Open Invitational (2)	−16 (68-67-68-69=272)	3 strokes	(United States) Rod Curl
16	Jan 11, 1976	NBC Tucson Open (3)	−14 (70-69-67-68=274)	3 strokes	(United States) Howard Twitty
17	Feb 8, 1976	Bob Hope Desert Classic (2)	−16 (71-69-73-68-63=344)	3 strokes	(United States) Rik Massengale
18	Jul 10, 1976	The Open Championship	−9 (72-68-73-66=279)	6 strokes	(Spain) Seve Ballesteros, (United States) Jack Nicklaus
19	Mar 9, 1980	Jackie Gleason-Inverrary Classic	−14 (70-68-66-70=274)	2 strokes	(United States) Charles Coody, (United States) Bruce Lietzke
20	Jan 11, 1981	Joe Garagiola-Tucson Open (4)	−15 (66-64-70-65=265)	2 strokes	(United States) Lon Hinkle
21	Feb 22, 1981	Glen Campbell-Los Angeles Open	−14 (66-69-67-68=270)	2 strokes	(United States) Tom Weiskopf
22	Jan 31, 1982	Wickes-Andy Williams San Diego Open	−18 (65-67-68-70=270)	1 stroke	(United States) Jack Nicklaus
23	Mar 6, 1983	Honda Inverrary Classic	−10 (68-73-68-69=278)	2 strokes	(United States) Jack Nicklaus
24	Feb 1, 1987	AT&T Pebble Beach National Pro-Am (2)	−10 (72-72-68-66=278)	1 stroke	(United States) Payne Stewart
25	Feb 6, 1994	AT&T Pebble Beach National Pro-Am (3)	−7 (68-72-67-74=281)	1 stroke	(United States) Jeff Maggert, (United States) Corey Pavin, (United States) Tom Watson, (United States) Kirk Triplett

PGA Tour playoff record (1–5)

No.	Year	Tournament	Opponent(s)	Result
1	1972	Bing Crosby National Pro-Am	(United States) Jack Nicklaus	Lost to birdie on first extra hole
2	1974	World Open Golf Championship	(United States) Frank Beard, (United States) Bob Murphy, (United States) Jack Nicklaus	Won with birdie on second extra hole Murphy eliminated by par on first hole
3	1979	Colgate Hall of Fame Classic	(United States) Tom Watson	Lost to par on second extra hole
4	1982	Glen Campbell-Los Angeles Open	(United States) Tom Watson	Lost to birdie on third extra hole
5	1983	Phoenix Open	(United States) Rex Caldwell, (United States) Bob Gilder, (United States) Mark O'Meara	Gilder won with birdie on eighth extra hole Miller and O'Meara eliminated by birdie on second hole
6	1983	Canadian Open	(United States) John Cook	Lost to birdie on sixth extra hole

=== PGA of Japan Tour wins (1) ===
No.	Date	Tournament	Winning score	Margin of victory	Runner-up
1	Dec 8, 1974	Dunlop Phoenix Tournament	−14 (69-69-69-67=274)	7 strokes	(Taiwan) Lu Liang-Huan

=== New Zealand Golf Circuit wins (1) ===
No.	Date	Tournament	Winning score	Margin of victory	Runner-up
1	Nov 19, 1972	Otago Charity Classic	−7 (70-68-72-71=281)	Playoff	(Taiwan) Lu Liang-Huan

New Zealand Golf Circuit playoff record (1–0)

No.	Year	Tournament	Opponent	Result
1	1972	Otago Charity Classic	(Taiwan) Lu Liang-Huan	Won with birdie on first extra hole

=== Other wins (9) ===
No.	Date	Tournament	Winning score	Margin of victory	Runner(s)-up
1	Oct 7, 1973	Trophée Lancôme	−11 (68-69-71-69=277)	3 strokes	(Spain) Valentín Barrios
2	Nov 25, 1973	World Cup (with (United States) Jack Nicklaus)	−18 (142-133-145-138=558)	6 strokes	South Africa − Hugh Baiocchi and Gary Player
3	Nov 25, 1973	World Cup Individual Trophy	−11 (73-65-72-67=277)	3 strokes	(South Africa) Gary Player
4	Dec 7, 1975	World Cup (2) (with (United States) Lou Graham)	−22 (134-142-140-138=554)	10 strokes	Taiwan − Hsieh Min-Nan and Kuo Chie-Hsiung
5	Dec 7, 1975	World Cup Individual Trophy (2)	−13 (66-71-70-68=275)	2 strokes	(Philippines) Ben Arda, (Taiwan) Hsieh Min-Nan, (Australia) Bob Shearer
6	Oct 28, 1979	Trophée Lancôme (2)	−7 (70-71-69-71=281)	3 strokes	(Scotland) Sandy Lyle, (United States) Lee Trevino
7	Jan 3, 1982	Nedbank Million Dollar Challenge	−11 (72-68-66-71=277)	Playoff	(Spain) Seve Ballesteros
8	Dec 18, 1983	Chrysler Team Championship (with (United States) Jack Nicklaus)	−11 (61-65-65=191)	1 stroke	(United States) Al Geiberger and (England) Peter Oosterhuis
9	Dec 31, 1983	Spalding Invitational	−17 (64-68-69-69=270)	5 strokes	(United States) Bob Gilder

Other playoff record (1–1)

No.	Year	Tournament	Opponent(s)	Result
1	1982	Nedbank Million Dollar Challenge	(Spain) Seve Ballesteros	Won with par on ninth extra hole
2	2000	Office Depot Father/Son Challenge (with son Scott Miller)	(United States) Raymond Floyd and son Robert Floyd	Lost to birdie on first extra hole

== Major championships ==
=== Wins (2) ===
Year	Championship	54 holes	Winning score	Margin	Runner(s)-up
1973	U.S. Open	6 shot deficit	−5 (71-69-76-63=279)	1 stroke	(United States) John Schlee
1976	The Open Championship	2 shot deficit	−9 (72-68-73-66=279)	6 strokes	(Spain) Seve Ballesteros, (United States) Jack Nicklaus

=== Results timeline ===
Tournament	1966	1967	1968	1969
Masters Tournament		T53		
U.S. Open	T8LA	CUT		T42
The Open Championship				
PGA Championship				

Tournament	1970	1971	1972	1973	1974	1975	1976	1977	1978	1979
Masters Tournament		T2	CUT	T6	T15	T2	T23	T35	T32	CUT
U.S. Open	T18	T5	7	1	T35	T38	10	T27	T6	CUT
The Open Championship		T47	T15	T2	10	T3	1	T9	CUT	T57
PGA Championship	T12	T20	T20	T18	T39	CUT		T11	T38	

Tournament	1980	1981	1982	1983	1984	1985	1986	1987	1988	1989
Masters Tournament	T38	T2	CUT	T12	CUT	T25	T28	T42		
U.S. Open	CUT	T23	T45	CUT	T4	8	T45	CUT		
The Open Championship	CUT	T39	T22		T31		CUT		T52	T49
PGA Championship	T68	CUT	T32	T30	WD	CUT	WD	WD		

Tournament	1990	1991	1992	1993	1994
Masters Tournament					CUT
U.S. Open					CUT
The Open Championship		CUT			
PGA Championship					

Win
Top 10
Did not play

LA = Low amateur
CUT = missed the halfway cut (3rd round cut in 1980 Open Championship)
DQ = disqualified
WD = withdrew
"T" indicates a tie for a place.

=== Summary ===
Tournament	Wins	2nd	3rd	Top-5	Top-10	Top-25	Events	Cuts made
Masters Tournament	0	3	0	3	4	8	19	14
U.S. Open	1	0	0	3	8	10	22	16
The Open Championship	1	1	1	3	5	7	17	13
PGA Championship	0	0	0	0	0	5	16	10
Totals	2	4	1	9	17	30	74	53

- Most consecutive cuts made – 14 (1972 U.S. Open – 1975 Open Championship)
- Longest streak of top-10s – 3 (1973 Masters – 1973 Open Championship)

== U.S. national team appearances ==
Professional

- Ryder Cup: 1975 (winners), 1981 (winners)
- World Cup: 1973 (winners, individual winner), 1975 (winners, individual winner), 1980
- Wendy's 3-Tour Challenge (representing Senior PGA Tour): 1997

== See also ==
- Spring 1969 PGA Tour Qualifying School graduates
- List of golfers with most PGA Tour wins
- Longest PGA Tour win streaks
- Most PGA Tour wins in a year
