= Jim Jamieson =

American professional golfer (1943–2018)

Personal information
- Full name: James A. Jamieson
- Nationality: United States
- Born: April 21, 1943 Kalamazoo, Michigan, U.S.
- Died: December 5, 2018 (aged 75)
- Height: 5 ft 10 in (1.78 m)
- Weight: 210 lb (95 kg; 15 st)

Career
- Sport: Golf
- College: Oklahoma State University
- Turned professional: 1968
- Former tour: PGA Tour
- Professional wins: 1

Number of wins by tour
- PGA Tour: 1

Best results in major championships
- Masters Tournament: T3: 1973
- PGA Championship: T2: 1972
- U.S. Open: T26: 1974
- The Open Championship: DNP

James A. Jamieson (April 21, 1943 – December 5, 2018) was an American professional golfer who played on the PGA Tour in the 1970s.

== Early life ==
Jamieson was born in Kalamazoo, Michigan and raised in Moline, Illinois. He started playing golf at age 7 at Oakwood Country Club in Moline. He attended Oklahoma State University, where he was an All-American and a member of the 1963 NCAA Championship golf team. Jamieson served in Vietnam before turning pro in 1968.

== Professional career ==
In 1970, he joined the PGA Tour. Jamieson played in about 180 PGA Tour events from 1970 to 1978. His career year was 1972 when he won the Western Open and had eight other top-10 finishes in PGA Tour events including a T-5 at The Masters and a T-2 at the PGA Championship. He had four top-6 finishes in major championships between 1971 and 1973. Jamieson played with Tom Weiskopf in the 1972 World Cup in Melbourne, Australia, finishing tied for fourth place with Australia.

Jamieson was forced to retire from the PGA Tour after he fell and broke his hand at a hotel in Phoenix in 1977. After the injury, he became the head club pro at the Greenbrier Hotel in White Sulphur Springs, West Virginia, a position once held by Sam Snead. He also chaired the Ryder Cup when it was held at the Greenbrier in 1979. Other stints in Jamieson's career as a teaching and club pro have included lead instructor at the John Jacobs Golf School, head pro at The Pines Golf Club, head pro at the Pete Dye Golf Club, Director of Golf at Whitewater Golf Club in Thunder Bay, Ontario, and as operator of the Jim Jamieson School of Golf at the Resort at Glade Springs in Daniels, West Virginia. He also owned two golf courses for about 6 years.

== Personal life ==
Jamieson died on December 5, 2018.

== Amateur wins ==
- 1961 Waterloo Amateur
- 1967 Illinois State Amateur

== Professional wins (1) ==
=== PGA Tour wins (1) ===
No.	Date	Tournament	Winning score	Margin of victory	Runner-up
1	Jun 25, 1972	Western Open	−13 (68-67-67-69=271)	6 strokes	(United States) Labron Harris Jr.

== Results in major championships ==
Tournament	1967	1968	1969	1970	1971	1972	1973	1974
Masters Tournament						T5	T3	CUT
U.S. Open	CUT				CUT	CUT	T58	T26
PGA Championship					T6	T2	T18	WD

Note: Jamieson never played in The Open Championship.

Top 10
Did not play

CUT = missed the half-way cut
WD = withdrew
"T" indicates a tie for a place

== U.S. national team appearances ==
Professional

- World Cup: 1972

== See also ==
- Fall 1968 PGA Tour Qualifying School graduates
