= Labron Harris Jr. =

American professional golfer (born 1941)

Personal information
- Full name: Labron E. Harris Jr.
- Nationality: United States
- Born: September 27, 1941 (age 85) Stillwater, Oklahoma, U.S.
- Height: 6 ft 4 in (1.93 m)
- Weight: 200 lb (91 kg; 14 st)

Career
- Sport: Golf
- College: Oklahoma State University
- Turned professional: 1964
- Former tours: PGA Tour; Champions Tour
- Professional wins: 2

Number of wins by tour
- PGA Tour: 1
- Other: 1

Best results in major championships
- Masters Tournament: T32: 1963
- PGA Championship: T63: 1971
- U.S. Open: T24: 1965
- The Open Championship: DNP

Labron E. Harris Jr. (born September 27, 1941) is an American professional golfer who played on the PGA Tour in the 1960s and 1970s.

Harris was born in Stillwater, Oklahoma, and grew up playing the Oklahoma State University practice facility, Lakeside Golf Course. He attended Oklahoma State University, where he was a distinguished member of the golf team: second-team All-American in 1961, first-team All-American and winner of the U.S. Amateur in 1962. Harris won the 1983 Oklahoma Open and was low amateur at the 1963 Masters. He played on the winning Walker Cup, Eisenhower Trophy and Americas Cup teams. Harris turned professional in 1964; he was runner-up in voting for Rookie of the Year. Harris won the 1964 Par 3 Tournament preceding the Masters.

His father, Labron Harris, Sr. was the Oklahoma State Cowboys golf coach from 1947 to 1973.

In addition to playing golf at Oklahoma State, Harris earned a master's degree in statistics while studying at the university.

Harris defeated Bert Yancey in a playoff at the 1971 Robinson Open Golf Classic. Also in 1971, Harris was the first-round leader at the U.S. Open with a score of 67, eventually fading to finish the tournament at T-46. His best finish in a major was a T-24 at the 1965 U.S. Open.

Harris served as vice-president of the PGA of America and was a member of the PGA Tour Policy Board 1975–1976. In 1977, Harris joined the PGA Tour staff as Director of Tournament Operations. Duties included purse negotiations and scheduling with the sponsors, running the Qualifying Schools, supporting the field staff in tournament operations and general support activities of the PGA Tour operations.

During this time he redid the tournament purse breakdown to its present form, worked with John Barron of Rogers and Wells law firm to rewrite the tournament regulations, worked with Merrill Lynch to work out a more convenient payment of the purse to the players, started the Senior PGA Tour and was a part of many other positive changes in the tour operations.

In 1981, he left the PGA Tour to work with Kemper Sports Management, a company involved with golf course and tournament management. He was Executive Director of the men's and women's Kemper Opens from 1982–1986 as well as the PGA Seniors in 1982 and the 1983 Ryder Cup. The 1983 Ryder Cup was the first one that sought out corporate sponsorships and was the start of what is now recognized as one of the premier golf events. In 1986, he left Kemper Sports Management and started his own consulting firm which he operated until he began preparing for the Champions Tour. Harris retired from golf in 1996.

Harris is currently a prominent stamp dealer with a U.S. postal history specialty living in Maryland.

== Amateur wins ==
- 1960 Western Junior
- 1962 U.S. Amateur

== Professional wins (2) ==
=== PGA Tour wins (1) ===
No.	Date	Tournament	Winning score	Margin of victory	Runner-up
1	Sep 26, 1971	Robinson Open Golf Classic	−10 (68-70-69-67=274)	Playoff	(United States) Bert Yancey

PGA Tour playoff record (1–1)

No.	Year	Tournament	Opponent	Result
1	1968	Philadelphia Golf Classic	(United States) Bob Murphy	Lost to birdie on third extra hole
2	1971	Robinson Open Golf Classic	(United States) Bert Yancey	Won with birdie on third extra hole

=== Other wins (1) ===
- 1963 Oklahoma Open

== U.S. national team appearances ==
Amateur

- Walker Cup: 1963 (winners)
- Eisenhower Trophy: 1962 (winners)
- Americas Cup: 1963 (winners)
