= 1972 U.S. Open (golf) =

Tournament information
- Dates: June 15–18, 1972
- Location: Pebble Beach, California; 36.568°N 121.950°W
- Course: Pebble Beach Golf Links
- Organized by: USGA
- Tour: PGA Tour

Statistics
- Par: 72
- Length: 6,812 yards (6,229 m)
- Field: 150 players, 70 after cut
- Cut: 154 (+10)
- Prize fund: $194,600
- Winner's share: $30,000

Champion
- (United States) Jack Nicklaus
- 290 (+2)

Location map
- Location in the United States Location in California

The 1972 U.S. Open was the 72nd U.S. Open, held June 15–18 at Pebble Beach Golf Links in Pebble Beach, California. Jack Nicklaus, age 32, captured his third U.S. Open title, three strokes ahead of runner-up Bruce Crampton. This was the first of six major championships held to date at Pebble Beach: five U.S. Opens and the PGA Championship in 1977. This was also the first time the U.S. Open was played at a public golf course.

Scoring conditions during the final round were extremely difficult; the average was 78.8, the highest in post-war U.S. Open history. Nicklaus' 290 (+2) was the second-highest winning score during that span. It was Nicklaus' eleventh career major championship as a professional, tying the record of Walter Hagen. When combined with his two U.S. Amateur wins, it was his thirteenth major, equaling Bobby Jones for most all-time.

Defending champion Lee Trevino had been hospitalized in Texas for several days for bronchitis and pneumonia; he was released on Tuesday, two days before the first round, and tied for fourth.

It was the second consecutive major title for Nicklaus, who won the Masters in April. Previous winners of the first two majors of the year were Craig Wood (1941), Ben Hogan (1951, 1953), and Arnold Palmer (1960); later champions of both were Tiger Woods (2002) and Jordan Spieth (2015). In addition, Nicklaus held the PGA Championship title from February 1971; four weeks later, he was the runner-up by a single stroke at the Open Championship at Muirfield, Scotland.

Nicklaus won seven additional majors, the last at the Masters fourteen years later in 1986 at age 46.

== Course layout ==
Hole	1	2	3	4	5	6	7	8	9	Out	10	11	12	13	14	15	16	17	18	In	Total
Yards	385	504	368	325	180	515	120	425	450	3,272	436	380	205	400	555	406	400	218	540	3,540	6,812
Par	4	5	4	4	3	5	3	4	4	36	4	4	3	4	5	4	4	3	5	36	72

== Round summaries ==
=== First round ===
Thursday, June 15, 1972

Place	Player	Score	To par
T1	(United States) Jack Nicklaus	71	−1
T1	(United States) Orville Moody	71	−1
T1	(United States) Chi-Chi Rodríguez	71	−1
T1	(United States) Mason Rudolph	71	−1
T1	(United States) Tom Shaw	71	−1
T1	(United States) Kermit Zarley	71	−1
T7	(South Africa) Bobby Cole	72	E
T7	(United States) Don Massengale	72	E
T7	(South Africa) Gary Player	72	E
T7	(Mexico) Cesar Sanudo	72	E

=== Second round ===
Friday, June 16, 1972

Place	Player	Score	To par
T1	(United States) Jack Nicklaus	71-73=144	E
T1	(Australia) Bruce Crampton	74-70=144	E
T1	(United States) Kermit Zarley	71-73=144	E
T1	(United States) Lanny Wadkins	76-68=144	E
T1	(United States) Homero Blancas	74-70=144	E
T1	(Mexico) Cesar Sanudo	72-72=144	E
7	(United States) Arnold Palmer	77-68=145	+1
T8	(United States) Lee Trevino	74-72=146	+2
T8	(United States) Lee Elder	75-71=146	+2
T8	(United States) Ralph Johnston	74-72=146	+2
T8	(United States) Rod Funseth	73-73=146	+2
T8	(South Africa) Gary Player	72-74=146	+2
T8	(United States) Chi-Chi Rodríguez	71-75=146	+2

=== Third round ===
Saturday, June 17, 1972

Place	Player	Score	To par
1	(United States) Jack Nicklaus	71-73-72=216	E
T2	(Australia) Bruce Crampton	74-70-73=217	+1
T2	(United States) Kermit Zarley	71-73-73=217	+1
T2	(United States) Lee Trevino	74-72-71=217	+1
T5	(United States) Arnold Palmer	77-68-73=218	+2
T5	(United States) Johnny Miller	74-73-71=218	+2
T7	(United States) Homero Blancas	74-70-76=220	+4
T7	(United States) Tom Weiskopf	73-74-73=220	+4
T9	(United States) Don January	76-71-74=221	+5
T9	(South Africa) Gary Player	72-74-75=221	+5

=== Final round ===
Sunday, June 18, 1972

In high winds, Nicklaus was even par on the front nine; after a double-bogey at the tenth, Arnold Palmer and Bruce Crampton trailed by just two shots. Palmer had a chance to tie Nicklaus at the 14th, but he missed a 10-footer (3 m) for birdie. Down by one stroke, Palmer bogeyed the next two holes and finished with a final-round 76, four shots behind.

Through six holes of the final round, Kermit Zarley was tied for the lead with Nicklaus at 1-over par. Zarley, however, played holes 7–14 with only two pars to go along with five bogeys and a triple-bogey on the par-5 14th to fall to 9-over for the tournament. This stretch of holes included four consecutive bogeys at 7, 8, 9 and 10 and missing very short par putts.

With a three-shot lead over Crampton on the tee of the par-3 17th, Nicklaus hit one of his most famous shots. His 1-iron went directly at the pin, bounced once, struck the flagstick, and settled inches from the hole for a tap-in birdie. With the lead at four strokes on the final tee, he bogeyed for 74 (+2) and the win.

Place	Player	Score	To par	Money ($)
1	(United States) Jack Nicklaus	71-73-72-74=290	+2	30,000
2	(Australia) Bruce Crampton	74-70-73-76=293	+5	15,000
3	(United States) Arnold Palmer	77-68-73-76=294	+6	10,000
T4	(United States) Homero Blancas	74-70-76-75=295	+7	7,500
T4	(United States) Lee Trevino	74-72-71-78=295	+7	7,500
6	(United States) Kermit Zarley	71-73-73-79=296	+8	6,000
7	(United States) Johnny Miller	74-73-71-79=297	+9	5,000
8	(United States) Tom Weiskopf	73-74-73-78=298	+10	4,000
T9	(United States) Chi-Chi Rodríguez	71-75-78-75=299	+11	3,250
T9	(Mexico) Cesar Sanudo	72-72-78-77=299	+11	3,250

==== Scorecard ====
Hole	1	2	3	4	5	6	7	8	9	10	11	12	13	14	15	16	17	18
Par	4	5	4	4	3	5	3	4	4	4	4	3	4	5	4	4	3	5
(United States) Nicklaus	E	−1	−1	E	+1	+1	E	E	E	+2	+2	+3	+3	+3	+2	+2	+1	+2
(Australia) Crampton	+1	E	+2	+2	+2	+3	+3	+3	+3	+4	+5	+5	+5	+6	+5	+5	+5	+5
(United States) Palmer	+2	+2	+1	+1	+1	+2	+2	+3	+3	+4	+4	+4	+4	+4	+5	+6	+6	+6
(United States) Blancas	+4	+3	+3	+3	+2	+2	+2	+2	+2	+3	+3	+5	+5	+5	+5	+6	+6	+7
(United States) Trevino	+1	+2	+3	+3	+3	+4	+4	+4	+4	+5	+6	+6	+7	+6	+6	+6	+7	+7
(United States) Zarley	+1	+1	+1	+1	+1	+1	+2	+3	+4	+5	+5	+6	+6	+9	+9	+9	+8	+8
(United States) Miller	+1	+1	+1	+3	+3	+3	+4	+6	+7	+7	+7	+7	+7	+8	+9	+9	+9	+9
(United States) Weiskopf	+5	+4	+4	+6	+5	+5	+5	+6	+6	+8	+8	+8	+8	+9	+8	+7	+8	+10
(United States) Rodriguez	+8	+8	+9	+8	+8	+9	+9	+9	+10	+10	+10	+10	+10	+10	+10	+11	+12	+11
(Mexico) Sanudo	+12	+11	+11	+12	+12	+12	+11	+10	+11	+11	+10	+10	+10	+10	+11	+11	+11	+11

Cumulative tournament scores, relative to par

Birdie	Bogey	Double bogey	Triple bogey+
