= 1973 U.S. Open (golf) =

Tournament information
- Dates: June 14–17, 1973
- Location: Oakmont, Pennsylvania; 40.526°N 79.827°W
- Course: Oakmont Country Club
- Organized by: USGA
- Tour: PGA Tour

Statistics
- Par: 71
- Length: 6,921 yards (6,329 m)
- Field: 149 players, 65 after cut
- Cut: 150 (+8)
- Prize fund: $219,400
- Winner's share: $35,000

Champion
- (United States) Johnny Miller
- 279 (−5)
- Location in the United States Location in Pennsylvania

The 1973 U.S. Open was the 73rd U.S. Open, held June 14–17 at Oakmont Country Club in Oakmont, Pennsylvania, a suburb northeast of Pittsburgh. In one of the finest performances in tournament history, Johnny Miller fired a record, 8-under-par 63 in the final round to win his first major championship, one stroke ahead of runner-up John Schlee.

Jack Nicklaus, the winner at Oakmont eleven years earlier, was the favorite entering the championship. Daily admission on the weekend was ten dollars.

== Course layout ==
Hole	1	2	3	4	5	6	7	8	9	Out	10	11	12	13	14	15	16	17	18	In	Total
Yards	469	343	425	549	379	195	395	244	480	3,479	462	371	603	185	360	453	230	322	456	3,442	6,921
Par	4	4	4	5	4	3	4	3	5	36	4	4	5	3	4	4	3	4	4	35	71

Lengths of the course for previous major championships:

- 6,894 yards (6,304 m), par 71 - 1962 U.S. Open
- 6,916 yards (6,324 m), par 72 - 1953 U.S. Open
- 6,882 yards (6,293 m), par 72 - 1951 PGA Championship
- 6,981 yards (6,383 m), par 72 - 1935 U.S. Open
- 6,965 yards (6,369 m), par 72 - 1927 U.S. Open
- 6,707 yards (6,133 m), par 74 - 1922 PGA Championship

Before 1962, the first hole was played as a par 5.

== Round summaries ==
=== First round ===
Thursday, June 14, 1973

Underweight from recent surgeries, 1965 champion Gary Player shot 67 to lead by three strokes.

Place	Player	Score	To par
1	(South Africa) Gary Player	67	−4
T2	(United States) Lee Trevino	70	−1
T2	(United States) Jim Colbert	70	−1
T2	(United States) Raymond Floyd	70	−1
T5	(United States) Jack Nicklaus	71	E
T5	(United States) Johnny Miller	71	E
T5	(United States) Arnold Palmer	71	E
T5	(United States) Gene Littler	71	E
T5	(New Zealand) Bob Charles	71	E
T5	(United States) Ralph Johnston	71	E

=== Second round ===
Friday, June 15, 1973

Player shot 70 for 137 to lead by one at the midway point.

Place	Player	Score	To par
1	(South Africa) Gary Player	67-70=137	−5
2	(United States) Jim Colbert	70-68=138	−4
T3	(United States) Jack Nicklaus	71-69=140	−2
T3	(United States) Johnny Miller	71-69=140	−2
T3	(New Zealand) Bob Charles	71-69=140	−2
T6	(United States) Gene Borek	77-65=142	E
T6	(United States) Julius Boros	73-69=142	E
T6	(United States) Tom Weiskopf	73-69=142	E
T6	(United States) Arnold Palmer	71-71=142	E
T6	(United States) Lee Trevino	70-72=142	E

=== Third round ===
Saturday, June 16, 1973

Place	Player	Score	To par
T1	(United States) Jerry Heard	74-70-66=210	−3
T1	(United States) John Schlee	73-70-67=210	−3
T1	(United States) Arnold Palmer	71-71-68=210	−3
T1	(United States) Julius Boros	73-69-68=210	−3
5	(United States) Tom Weiskopf	73-69-69=211	−2
T6	(United States) Lee Trevino	70-72-70=212	−1
T6	(New Zealand) Bob Charles	71-69-72=212	−1
T6	(United States) Jim Colbert	70-68-74=212	−1
T9	(United States) Jack Nicklaus	71-69-74=214	+1
T9	(South Africa) Gary Player	67-70-77=214	+1

=== Final round ===
Sunday, June 17, 1973

Four players shared the 54-hole lead: Schlee, Jerry Heard, 1963 champion Julius Boros, and 1960 winner Arnold Palmer. After a 76 (+5) on Saturday, Miller started the final round six strokes back, in a four-way tie for 13th place at three strokes over par, and few gave him any chance of winning. Miller birdied the first four holes, but after a bogey at the eighth, it certainly did not appear like he was on the brink of the greatest round in U.S. Open history.

But he then birdied four of the next five holes, and after a par at 14 he was tied for the lead with Palmer, Boros, and Tom Weiskopf. At the 15th hole, Miller hit his approach to ten feet (3 m) and converted for birdie to take solo possession of the lead. After lipping out a twenty-foot (6 m) birdie putt at 18 (for a 62), Miller carded the first round of 63 in major championship history. Finishing over an hour ahead of the last pairing, Miller then waited to see if anyone would match him. Palmer fell out of contention with three consecutive bogeys to finish in a tie for fourth. Boros and Heard both shot 73 and finished in a tie for seventh. Despite John Schlee taking a double-bogey on the 1st hole of the final round by the time he got to the 18th tee, he was the only player left on the course with a chance to tie Miller. After finding the fairway, Schlee's second shot into 18 went just over the green and he was left having to hole a 45-foot chip for birdie. Schlee's chip to tie stopped a foot short and he finished 2nd alone at 4-under par 280.

In shooting 63, Miller hit all 18 greens in regulation and needed 29 putts. Ten of his approach shots wound up within 15 feet (4.6 m), while five were within 6 feet (1.8 m). His score was even more remarkable given that only three other players managed to even break 70 on the day.

Place	Player	Score	To par	Money ($)
1	(United States) Johnny Miller	71-69-76-63=279	−5	35,000
2	(United States) John Schlee	73-70-67-70=280	−4	18,000
3	(United States) Tom Weiskopf	73-69-69-70=281	−3	13,000
T4	(United States) Jack Nicklaus	71-69-74-68=282	−2	9,000
T4	(United States) Arnold Palmer	71-71-68-72=282	−2	9,000
T4	(United States) Lee Trevino	70-72-70-70=282	−2	9,000
T7	(United States) Julius Boros	73-69-68-73=283	−1	6,000
T7	(United States) Jerry Heard	74-70-66-73=283	−1	6,000
T7	(United States) Lanny Wadkins	74-69-75-65=283	−1	6,000
10	(United States) Jim Colbert	70-68-74-72=284	E	4,000

- Amateurs: Vinny Giles (+6), Gary Koch (+18)

==== Scorecard ====
Final round

Hole	1	2	3	4	5	6	7	8	9	10	11	12	13	14	15	16	17	18
Par	4	4	4	5	4	3	4	3	5	4	4	5	3	4	4	3	4	4
(United States) Miller	+2	+1	E	−1	−1	−1	−1	E	−1	−1	−2	−3	−4	−4	−5	−5	−5	−5
(United States) Schlee	−1	−1	−1	−3	−2	−3	−3	−2	−3	−3	−3	−4	−3	−3	−3	−4	−4	−4
(United States) Weiskopf	−2	−3	−3	−3	−3	−3	−3	−3	−4	−3	−3	−3	−3	−2	−2	−3	−3	−3
(United States) Nicklaus	+1	E	E	E	E	E	E	+1	E	E	E	E	E	E	E	−1	−2	−2
(United States) Palmer	−3	−3	−3	−4	−4	−3	−3	−3	−4	−4	−4	−3	−2	−1	−1	−1	−1	−2
(United States) Trevino	E	−1	−1	−2	−2	−2	−2	−2	−3	−3	−3	−3	−3	−3	−3	−3	−2	−2
(United States) Wadkins	+5	+4	+4	+2	+2	+3	+3	+3	+1	+1	+1	E	−1	−1	−1	−1	−2	−1

Cumulative tournament scores, relative to par

Eagle	Birdie	Bogey	Double bogey

==== Miller's final round ====
Johnny Miller's 63: club selection and results - June 17, 1973

Hole	Yards	Par	Club selections	Score	Result	To par
1	469	4	Driver, 3-iron to 5 feet	3	birdie	−1
2	343	4	Driver, 9-iron to 1 foot	3	birdie	−2
3	425	4	Driver, 5-iron to 25 feet	3	birdie	−3
4	549	5	Driver, 3-wood, bunker shot to 6 inches	4	birdie	−4
5	379	4	Driver, 6-iron to 25 feet, 2 putts	4	par	−4
6	195	3	3-iron to 25 feet, 2 putts	3	par	−4
7	395	4	Driver, 9-iron to 6 feet, 2 putts	4	par	−4
8	244	3	4-wood to 30 feet, 3 putts	4	bogey	−3
9	480	5	Driver, 2-iron to 40 feet, 2 putts	4	birdie	−4
Out	3,479	36		32		−4
10	462	4	Driver, 5-iron to 25 feet, 2 putts	4	par	−4
11	371	4	Driver, wedge to 14 feet	3	birdie	−5
12	603	5	Driver, 7-iron, 4-iron to 15 feet	4	birdie	−6
13	185	3	4-iron to 5 feet	2	birdie	−7
14	360	4	Driver, wedge to 12 feet, 2 putts	4	par	−7
15	453	4	Driver, 4-iron to 10 feet	3	birdie	−8
16	230	3	2-iron to 45 feet, 2 putts	3	par	−8
17	322	4	2-iron, wedge to 10 feet, 2 putts	4	par	−8
18	456	4	Driver, 5-iron to 20 feet, 2 putts	4	par	−8
In	3,442	35		31		−4
Total	6,921	71		63		−8

== Video ==
- You Tube - Miller on 72nd hole - USGA (ABC broadcast)
