= Homero Blancas =

American professional golfer

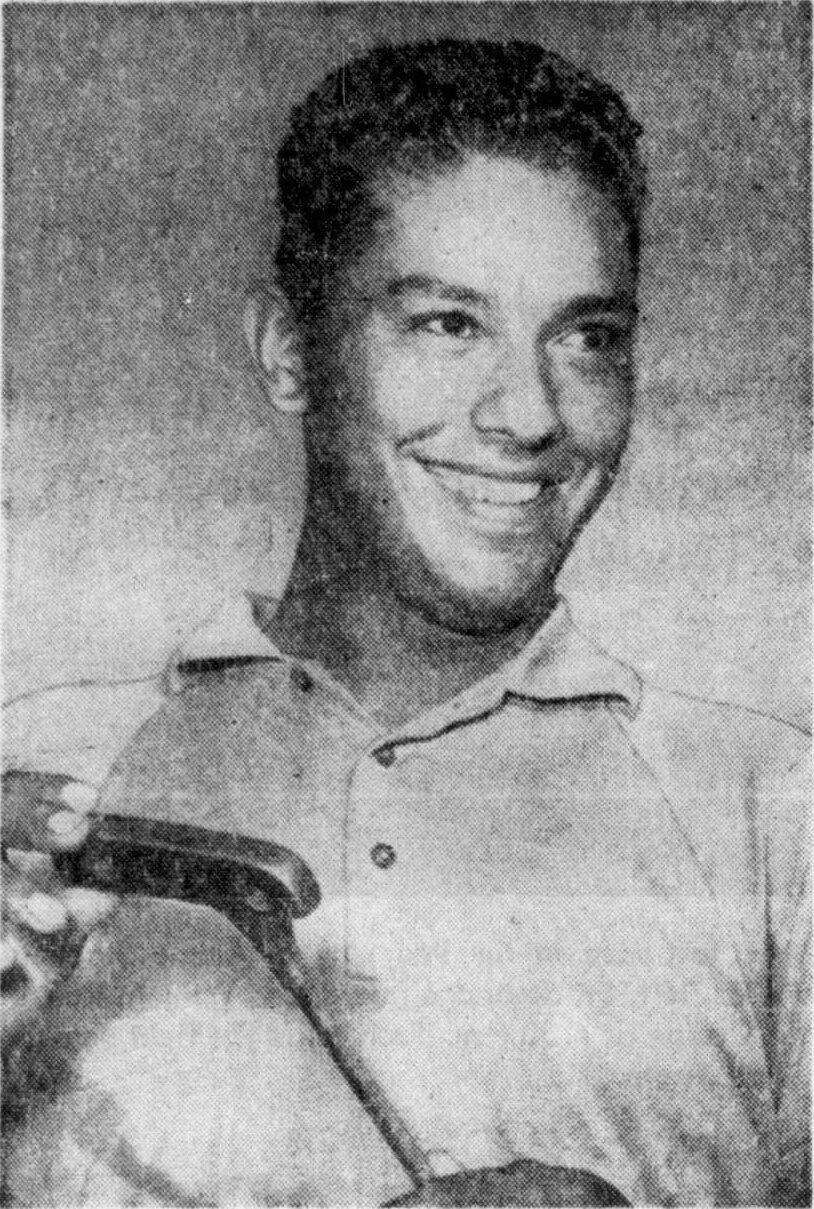
- Blancas in 1962

Personal information
- Full name: Homero Blancas, Jr.
- Nickname: Mr. 55
- Nationality: United States
- Born: March 7, 1938 (age 88) Houston, Texas, U.S.
- Height: 5 ft 10 in (1.78 m)
- Weight: 195 lb (88 kg; 13.9 st)

Career
- Sport: Golf
- College: University of Houston
- Turned professional: 1965
- Former tours: PGA Tour; Champions Tour
- Professional wins: 7

Number of wins by tour
- PGA Tour: 4
- PGA Tour Champions: 1
- Other: 2

Best results in major championships
- Masters Tournament: T5: 1972
- PGA Championship: T30: 1970
- U.S. Open: T4: 1972
- The Open Championship: DNP

Homero Blancas, Jr. (born March 7, 1938) is an American professional golfer who has played on both the PGA Tour and the Senior PGA Tour (now known as the Champions Tour).

== Amateur career ==
Blancas, who is of Mexican American descent, was born in Houston, Texas. He attended the University of Houston from 1958 to 1962, and was a member of the golf team. Blancas shot a record-setting round of 55 (27-28) in a college tournament, which stands as the lowest round in the history of competitive golf. His 13 birdies and an eagle on a par-70 course in Longview, Texas on August 19, 1962, earned him the nickname "Mr. 55." He was inducted into the University of Houston Athletics Hall of Fame in 1978.

Blancas' 55-shot round (played on a course of just over 5,000 yards) was included in the Guinness Book of Records for a time, but shortly after, officials removed his name after instituting a requirement that a course must be of at least 6,500 yards to achieve inclusion. The 55-shot round is still the lowest official golf score on record for course of regular par.

== Professional career ==
Blancas won four PGA Tour events. He turned pro in 1965 and was the PGA Rookie of the Year that year. He was a member of the 1973 Ryder Cup team. During his career on the PGA Tour, he had more than 4 dozen top-10 finishes. His best finishes in a major championship were a T-4 at the 1972 U.S. Open, and a T-5 at the 1972 Masters. Blancas spent the last 16 years of his regular career as club pro at Randolph Park in Tucson.

After turning 50 in March 1988, Blancas joined the Senior Tour. He has one victory in this venue – at the 1989 Doug Sanders Kingwood Celebrity Classic. He has 18 holes-in-one during his career, is a member of the Texas Golf Hall of Fame, and lives in Houston.

== Amateur wins ==
- 1962 W.E. Cole Cotton States Invitational
- 1963 W.E. Cole Cotton States Invitational
- 1964 W.E. Cole Cotton States Invitational

== Professional wins (8) ==
=== PGA Tour wins (4) ===
No.	Date	Tournament	Winning score	Margin of victory	Runner(s)-up
1	Sep 25, 1966	Greater Seattle-Everett Classic	−18 (66-65-65-70=266)	1 stroke	(United States) Jacky Cupit
2	May 17, 1970	Colonial National Invitation	−7 (69-68-69-67=273)	1 stroke	(United States) Gene Littler, (United States) Lee Trevino
3	Feb 20, 1972	Phoenix Open	−11 (70-61-73-69=273)	Playoff	(United States) Lanny Wadkins
4	Apr 15, 1973	Monsanto Open	−11 (67-69-66-75=277)	1 stroke	(United States) Frank Beard

PGA Tour playoff record (1–1)

No.	Year	Tournament	Opponent	Result
1	1969	Michigan Golf Classic	(United States) Larry Ziegler	Lost to birdie on second extra hole
2	1972	Phoenix Open	(United States) Lanny Wadkins	Won with birdie on first extra hole

=== Other wins (3) ===
- 1960 Texas State Open (as an amateur)
- 1963 Louisiana State Open (as an amateur)
- 1965 Mexican Open

=== Senior PGA Tour wins (1) ===
No.	Date	Tournament	Winning score	Margin of victory	Runners-up
1	Jun 4, 1989	Doug Sanders Kingwood Celebrity Classic	−8 (73-65-70=208)	2 strokes	(New Zealand) Bob Charles, (United States) Walt Zembriski

== Results in major championships ==
Tournament	1963	1964	1965	1966	1967	1968	1969	1970	1971	1972	1973	1974	1975
Masters Tournament	T39							CUT	CUT	T5	CUT	CUT	T43
U.S. Open			CUT			T52	T36		T19	T4	CUT	T40	CUT
PGA Championship								T30	T34	CUT	CUT	T67	T65

Note: Blancas never played in The Open Championship.

Top 10
Did not play

CUT = missed the half-way cut
"T" indicates a tie for a place

== U.S. national team appearances ==
Professional

- Ryder Cup: 1973 (winners)
