= Bobby Mitchell (golfer) =

American golfer (1943–2018)

Personal information
- Full name: Bobby Wayne Mitchell
- Nationality: United States
- Born: February 23, 1943 Chatham, Virginia, U.S.
- Died: March 20, 2018 (aged 75) Danville, Virginia, U.S.
- Height: 6 ft 0 in (1.83 m)
- Weight: 185 lb (84 kg; 13.2 st)

Career
- Sport: Golf
- Turned professional: 1959
- Former tours: PGA Tour; Champions Tour
- Professional wins: 5

Number of wins by tour
- PGA Tour: 2
- Other: 3

Best results in major championships
- Masters Tournament: T2: 1972
- PGA Championship: T34: 1971
- U.S. Open: T12: 1970
- The Open Championship: CUT: 1981, 1985

Bobby Wayne Mitchell (February 23, 1943 – March 20, 2018) was an American professional golfer who played on the PGA Tour and the Champions Tour.

== Career ==
Mitchell was born in Chatham, Virginia, and was raised in nearby Danville, Virginia. He dropped out of high school and turned pro at 15. He won the Virginia State Golf Association Open, the Virginia State PGA Open and the Carolinas PGA Championship before joining the PGA Tour.

Mitchell won two PGA Tour events during his career: the 1971 Cleveland Open and the 1972 Tournament of Champions. He had more than two dozen top-10 finishes in PGA Tour events including more than a half-dozen 2nd or 3rd-place finishes. His best finish in a major was T2 at the 1972 Masters Tournament.

Since 1991, Mitchell has traveled to Finland in the summer to teach golf to young people in association with Averett University. Mitchell joined the Champions Tour in 1995; his best finish in a Champions Tour event is a T-12 at The Transamerica in 1995.

== Personal life ==
Mitchell died on March 20, 2018, from a presumed heart attack at Lynchburg General Hospital.

== Professional wins (4) ==
=== PGA Tour wins (2) ===
No.	Date	Tournament	Winning score	Margin of victory	Runner-up
1	Jun 27, 1971	Cleveland Open	−22 (66-64-67-65=262)	7 strokes	(United States) Charles Coody
2	Apr 23, 1972	Tournament of Champions	−8 (71-65-74-70=280)	Playoff	(United States) Jack Nicklaus

PGA Tour playoff record (1–0)

No.	Year	Tournament	Opponent	Result
1	1972	Tournament of Champions	(United States) Jack Nicklaus	Won with birdie on first extra hole

=== Other wins (2) ===
- 1965 Virginia Open, Virginia PGA Open
- 1967 Carolinas PGA Championship

== Results in major championships ==
Tournament	1966	1967	1968	1969
Masters Tournament				
U.S. Open	CUT	CUT	CUT	T25
The Open Championship				
PGA Championship		T56	T59	T48

Tournament	1970	1971	1972	1973	1974	1975	1976	1977	1978	1979
Masters Tournament		T22	T2	CUT						
U.S. Open	T12	T27	T21	CUT	T23	CUT		CUT		
The Open Championship										
PGA Championship	T35	T34								

Tournament	1980	1981	1982	1983	1984	1985
Masters Tournament						
U.S. Open						
The Open Championship		CUT				CUT
PGA Championship					CUT	

Top 10
Did not play

CUT = missed the half-way cut
"T" = tied
