= Grier Jones =

American professional golfer and coach (born 1946)

Personal information
- Nationality: United States
- Born: May 6, 1946 (age 80) Wichita, Kansas, U.S.
- Height: 5 ft 10 in (1.78 m)
- Weight: 165 lb (75 kg; 11.8 st)

Career
- Sport: Golf
- College: Oklahoma State University
- Turned professional: 1968
- Former tour: PGA Tour
- Professional wins: 4

Number of wins by tour
- PGA Tour: 3
- Other: 1

Best results in major championships
- Masters Tournament: T33: 1972
- PGA Championship: T16: 1978
- U.S. Open: T18: 1975
- The Open Championship: DNP

Grier Jones (born May 6, 1946) is a former college head golf coach and former PGA Tour professional golfer.

== Early life ==
Jones was born, raised and has been a lifelong resident of Wichita, Kansas. He attended Wichita's Kapaun Mt. Carmel Catholic High School where he played both football and golf. He won the 1963 and 1964 Kansas State High School golf championships.

== Amateur career ==
An All-American at Oklahoma State University, Jones won the Big Eight Championship in 1967 and 1968 before taking the individual medalist honors at the 1968 NCAA Championships. He also won the 1966 Kansas State Amateur Championship held in Topeka, Kansas while a student at Oklahoma State.

== Professional career ==
In 1968, Jones turned professional. He spent fourteen years on the PGA Tour, beginning in 1969, when he earned PGA Rookie of the Year honors. His career year was 1972 when he won two PGA Tour events and finished fourth on the final money list. He won his third and final PGA Tour event in 1977. Jones ended his career with 54 top-10 finishes in PGA Tour events. His best finish in a major championship was a T-16 at the 1978 PGA Championship.

After his full-time tour playing days ended, Jones took a club teaching job at Willowbend Golf Club in Wichita, while continuing to play part-time on Nike Tour and PGA Tours. Later he became the head pro at Terradyne Country Club in Wichita. In 1995, he was named men's head golf coach at Wichita State University where he remained until his retirement in 2019.

== Personal life ==
Jones is married to Janie. They have five children: Carey, Corey, Grier II, Brian, and daughter Casey.

== Awards and honors ==
- In 1969, he earned PGA Tour Rookie of the Year honors
- In 1995, Jones was honored as the Kansas Chapter PGA Teacher-of-the-Year.
- Jones was named Missouri Valley Conference Coach of the Year seven times: in 1998, 2000, 2003, 2006, 2008, 2009, and 2010.
- In 2010, Jones was inducted into the Kansas Sports Hall of Fame

== Amateur wins ==
- 1966 Kansas State Amateur
- 1967 Big Eight Championship
- 1968 Big Eight Championship, NCAA Championship

== Professional wins (4) ==
=== PGA Tour wins (3) ===
No.	Date	Tournament	Winning score	Margin of victory	Runner(s)-up
1	Feb 6, 1972	Hawaiian Open	−14 (65-73-72-64=274)	Playoff	(United States) Bob Murphy
2	Sep 24, 1972	Robinson's Fall Golf Classic	−11 (66-72-67-68=273)	Playoff	(United States) Dave Marad
3	Nov 6, 1977	Walt Disney World National Team Championship (with (United States) Gibby Gilbert)	−35 (62-64-61-66=253)	1 stroke	(United States) Steve Melnyk and (United States) Andy North

PGA Tour playoff record (2–0)

No.	Year	Tournament	Opponent	Result
1	1972	Hawaiian Open	(United States) Bob Murphy	Won with par on first extra hole
2	1972	Robinson's Fall Golf Classic	(United States) Dave Marad	Won with par on second extra hole

=== Other wins (1) ===
- 1968 Oklahoma Open

== Results in major championships ==
Tournament	1967	1968	1969
Masters Tournament			
U.S. Open	CUT		
PGA Championship			

Tournament	1970	1971	1972	1973	1974	1975	1976	1977	1978	1979
Masters Tournament	T38		T33	T37						
U.S. Open		CUT		T45		T18	T28	T35		
PGA Championship		T41	T53	T51	T32		T30	T25	T16	

Tournament	1980	1981	1982	1983	1984
Masters Tournament					
U.S. Open					CUT
PGA Championship					

Note: Jones never played in The Open Championship.

Did not play

CUT = missed the half-way cut
"T" indicates a tie for a place

== See also ==
- Fall 1968 PGA Tour Qualifying School graduates
- 1983 PGA Tour Qualifying School graduates
