= 1990 Senior PGA Tour =

Golf tour season

1990 Senior PGA Tour season
- Duration: January 4, 1990 – December 16, 1990
- Number of official events: 39
- Most wins: (United States) Lee Trevino (7)
- Money list: (United States) Lee Trevino
- Player of the Year: (United States) Lee Trevino
- Rookie of the Year: (United States) Lee Trevino

The 1990 Senior PGA Tour was the 11th season of the Senior PGA Tour, the main professional golf tour in the United States for men aged 50 and over.

== Schedule ==
The following table lists official events during the 1990 season.

Date	Tournament	Location	Purse (US$)	Winner (Note: The number in parentheses after each winner's name is the number of Senior PGA Tour events they had won up to and including that tournament. This information is only shown for Senior PGA Tour members.)	Notes
Jan 7	MONY Senior Tournament of Champions	California	250,000	(United States) George Archer (2)	
Feb 4	Royal Caribbean Classic	Florida	400,000	(United States) Lee Trevino (1)	
Feb 11	GTE Suncoast Classic	Florida	450,000	(United States) Mike Hill (1)	
Feb 18	Aetna Challenge	Florida	400,000	(United States) Lee Trevino (2)	
Mar 4	Vintage Chrysler Invitational	California	400,000	(United States) Lee Trevino (3)	
Mar 18	Vantage at The Dominion	Texas	300,000	(United States) Jim Dent (3)	
Apr 1	The Tradition	Arizona	800,000	(United States) Jack Nicklaus (1)	Senior PGA Tour major championship
Apr 15	PGA Seniors' Championship	Florida	450,000	(South Africa) Gary Player (16)	Senior major championship
Apr 29	Murata Reunion Pro-Am	Texas	400,000	(United States) Frank Beard (1)	Pro-Am
May 6	Las Vegas Senior Classic	Nevada	450,000	(United States) Chi-Chi Rodríguez (14)	
May 13	Southwestern Bell Classic	Oklahoma	450,000	(United States) Jimmy Powell (1)	
May 20	Doug Sanders Kingwood Celebrity Classic	Texas	300,000	(United States) Lee Trevino (4)	
May 27	Bell Atlantic Classic	Pennsylvania	500,000	(United States) Dale Douglass (6)	
Jun 3	NYNEX Commemorative	New York	350,000	(United States) Lee Trevino (5)	
Jun 10	Mazda Senior Tournament Players Championship	Michigan	1,000,000	(United States) Jack Nicklaus (2)	Senior PGA Tour major championship
Jun 17	MONY Syracuse Senior Classic	New York	400,000	(United States) Jim Dent (4)	
Jun 24	Digital Seniors Classic	Massachusetts	350,000	(New Zealand) Bob Charles (15)	
Jul 1	U.S. Senior Open	New Jersey	450,000	(United States) Lee Trevino (6)	Senior major championship
Jul 8	Northville Long Island Classic	New York	450,000	(United States) George Archer (3)	
Jul 15	Kroger Senior Classic	Ohio	600,000	(United States) Jim Dent (5)	New tournament
Jul 22	Ameritech Senior Open	Michigan	500,000	(United States) Chi-Chi Rodríguez (15)	
Jul 29	Volvo Seniors' British Open	Scotland	£150,000	(South Africa) Gary Player (17)	Senior major championship (Note: Unofficial money event at the time, but retrospectively counted as an official win.)
Jul 29	Newport Cup	Rhode Island	300,000	(United States) Al Kelley (1)	
Aug 5	PaineWebber Invitational	North Carolina	450,000	(Australia) Bruce Crampton (16)	
Aug 12	Sunwest Bank Charley Pride Senior Golf Classic	New Mexico	350,000	(United States) Chi-Chi Rodríguez (16)	
Aug 19	Showdown Classic	Utah	350,000	(United States) Rives McBee (2)	
Aug 26	GTE Northwest Classic	Washington	350,000	(United States) George Archer (4)	
Sep 2	GTE North Classic	Indiana	450,000	(United States) Mike Hill (2)	
Sep 9	Vantage Bank One Classic	Kentucky	300,000	(United States) Rives McBee (3)	
Sep 16	Greater Grand Rapids Open	Michigan	300,000	(United States) Don Massengale (1)	
Sep 23	Crestar Classic	Virginia	350,000	(United States) Jim Dent (6)	
Sep 30	Fairfield Barnett Space Coast Classic	Florida	300,000	(United States) Mike Hill (3)	
Oct 7	Vantage Championship	North Carolina	1,500,000	(United States) Charles Coody (2)	
Oct 14	Gatlin Brothers Southwest Senior Classic	Texas	300,000	(Australia) Bruce Crampton (17)	
Oct 21	Transamerica Senior Golf Championship	California	500,000	(United States) Lee Trevino (7)	
Oct 28	Rancho Murieta Senior Gold Rush	California	400,000	(United States) George Archer (5)	
Nov 4	Security Pacific Senior Classic	California	500,000	(United States) Mike Hill (4)	New tournament
Dec 9	GTE Kaanapali Classic	Hawaii	450,000	(New Zealand) Bob Charles (16)	
Dec 16	New York Life Champions	Puerto Rico	1,000,000	(United States) Mike Hill (5)	New tournament Tour Championship

== Money list ==
The money list was based on prize money won during the season, calculated in U.S. dollars.

Position	Player	Prize money ($)
1	(United States) Lee Trevino	1,190,518
2	(United States) Mike Hill	895,678
3	(United States) Charles Coody	762,901
4	(United States) George Archer	749,691
5	(United States) Chi-Chi Rodríguez	729,788

== Awards ==
Award	Winner	Ref.
Player of the Year (Jack Nicklaus Trophy)	(United States) Lee Trevino	
Rookie of the Year	(United States) Lee Trevino	
Scoring leader (Byron Nelson Award)	(United States) Lee Trevino	
