= 1989 Senior PGA Tour =

Golf tour season

1989 Senior PGA Tour season
- Duration: January 5, 1989 – December 9, 1989
- Number of official events: 36 (Note: One further tournament was scheduled but was canceled.)
- Most wins: (New Zealand) Bob Charles (6)
- Money list: (New Zealand) Bob Charles

The 1989 Senior PGA Tour was the 10th season of the Senior PGA Tour, the main professional golf tour in the United States for men aged 50 and over.

== Schedule ==
The following table lists official events during the 1989 season.

Date	Tournament	Location	Purse (US$)	Winner (Note: The number in parentheses after each winner's name is the number of Senior PGA Tour events they had won up to and including that tournament. This information is only shown for Senior PGA Tour members.)	Notes
Jan 8	MONY Senior Tournament of Champions	California	250,000	(United States) Miller Barber (23)	
Feb 12	General Foods PGA Seniors' Championship	Florida	400,000	(United States) Larry Mowry (4)	Senior major championship
Feb 19	GTE Suncoast Classic	Florida	300,000	(New Zealand) Bob Charles (9)	
Feb 26	Aetna Challenge	Florida	300,000	(United States) Gene Littler (8)	
Mar 5	Vintage Chrysler Invitational	California	370,000	(United States) Miller Barber (24)	
Mar 12	MONY Arizona Classic	Arizona	300,000	(Australia) Bruce Crampton (14)	
Apr 2	Murata Seniors Reunion	Texas	300,000	(United States) Don Bies (3)	
Apr 16	The Tradition	Arizona	600,000	(United States) Don Bies (4)	New tournament Senior PGA Tour major championship
May 7	RJR at The Dominion	Texas	250,000	(United States) Larry Mowry (5)	
May 14	Bell Atlantic/St. Christopher's Classic	Pennsylvania	400,000	(United States) Dave Hill (5)	
May 21	NYNEX/Golf Digest Commemorative	New York	300,000	(New Zealand) Bob Charles (10)	
May 28	Southwestern Bell Classic	Oklahoma	300,000	(United States) Bobby Nichols (1)	
Jun 4	Doug Sanders Kingwood Celebrity Classic	Texas	300,000	(United States) Homero Blancas (1)	
Jun 11	Mazda Senior Tournament Players Championship	Florida	700,000	(United States) Orville Moody (8)	Senior PGA Tour major championship
Jun 18	Northville Long Island Classic	New York	350,000	(United States) Butch Baird (2)	
Jun 25	MONY Syracuse Senior Classic	New York	300,000	(United States) Jim Dent (1)	
Jul 2	U.S. Senior Open	Pennsylvania	450,000	(United States) Orville Moody (9)	Senior major championship
Jul 9	Digital Seniors Classic	Massachusetts	300,000	(New Zealand) Bob Charles (11)	
Jul 16	Greater Grand Rapids Open	Michigan	300,000	(United States) John Paul Cain (1)	
Jul 23	Ameritech Senior Open	Ohio	500,000	(Australia) Bruce Crampton (15)	New tournament
Jul 30	Volvo Seniors' British Open	Scotland	£150,000	(New Zealand) Bob Charles (12)	Senior major championship (Note: Unofficial money event at the time, but retrospectively counted as an official win.)
Jul 30	Newport Cup	Rhode Island	275,000	(United States) Jim Dent (2)	
Aug 6	Showdown Classic	Utah	350,000	(United States) Tom Shaw (1)	
Aug 13	Rancho Murieta Senior Gold Rush	California	350,000	(United States) Dave Hill (6)	
Aug 20	GTE Northwest Classic	Washington	350,000	(United States) Al Geiberger (5)	
Aug 27	Sunwest Bank Charley Pride Senior Golf Classic	New Mexico	300,000	(New Zealand) Bob Charles (13)	
Sep 3	RJR Bank One Classic	Kentucky	300,000	(United States) Rives McBee (1)	
Sep 10	GTE North Classic	Indiana	350,000	(South Africa) Gary Player (14)	
Sep 17	Crestar Classic	Virginia	350,000	(United States) Chi-Chi Rodríguez (13)	
~~Sep 24~~	PaineWebber Invitational	North Carolina	–	Canceled (Note: Canceled due to Hurricane Hugo.)	
Oct 1	Fairfield Barnett Space Coast Classic	Florida	300,000	(New Zealand) Bob Charles (14)	
Oct 8	RJR Championship	North Carolina	1,500,000	(South Africa) Gary Player (15)	
Oct 15	Gatlin Brothers Southwest Senior Classic	Texas	300,000	(United States) George Archer (1)	New tournament
Oct 22	Transamerica Senior Golf Championship	California	400,000	(United States) Billy Casper (9)	New tournament
Nov 12	General Tire Las Vegas Classic	Nevada	300,000	(United States) Charles Coody (1)	
Dec 2	GTE West Classic	California	350,000	(United States) Walt Zembriski (3)	
Dec 9	GTE Kaanapali Classic	Hawaii	300,000	(United States) Don Bies (5)	

== Money list ==
The money list was based on prize money won during the season, calculated in U.S. dollars.

Position	Player	Prize money ($)
1	(New Zealand) Bob Charles	725,887
2	(United States) Orville Moody	647,985
3	(United States) Al Geiberger	527,033
4	(South Africa) Gary Player	514,116
5	(United States) Dave Hill	488,541

== Awards ==
Award	Winner	Ref.
Scoring leader (Byron Nelson Award)	(New Zealand) Bob Charles	
