= Chi-Chi Rodríguez =

Puerto Rican professional golfer (1935–2024)

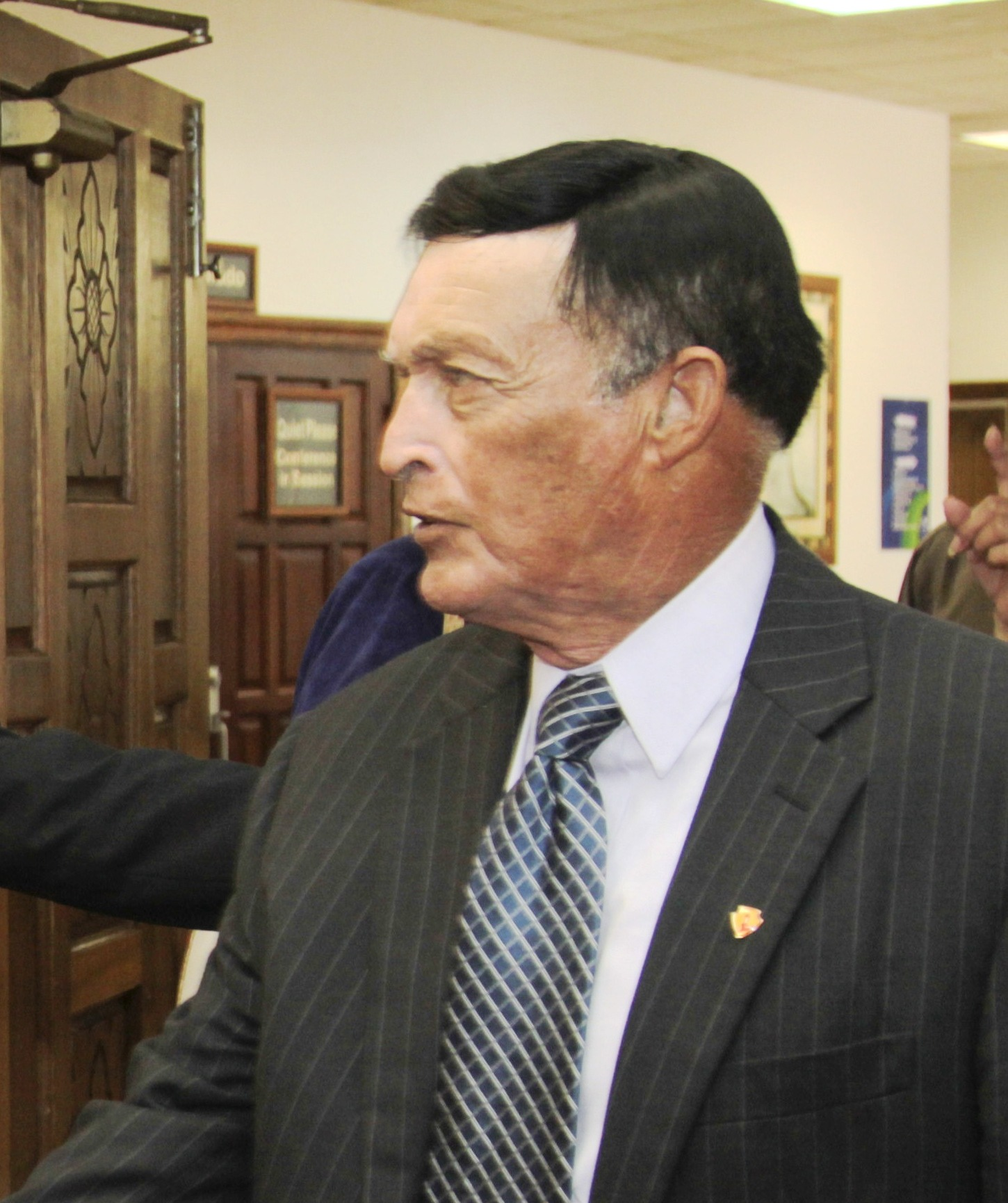
- Rodríguez in 2010

Personal information
- Full name: Juan Antonio Rodríguez
- Nickname: Chi-Chi (pronounced chee-chee)
- Nationality: Puerto Rico; United States
- Born: October 23, 1935 Rio Piedras, Puerto Rico
- Died: August 8, 2024 (aged 88) Clearwater, Florida U.S.
- Height: 5 ft 7 in (170 cm)
- Weight: 150 lb (68 kg; 11 st)
- Spouse: Iwalani Rodríguez

Career
- Sport: Golf
- Turned professional: 1960
- Former tours: PGA Tour; Senior PGA Tour
- Professional wins: 37

Number of wins by tour
- PGA Tour: 8
- PGA Tour Champions: 22 (Tied-7th all-time)
- Other: 7

Best results in major championships
- Masters Tournament: T10: 1970, 1973
- PGA Championship: T15: 1969
- U.S. Open: T6: 1981
- The Open Championship: T28: 1973

Achievements and awards
- World Golf Hall of Fame: 1992 (member page)
- Senior PGA Tour Byron Nelson Award: 1986, 1987
- Senior PGA Tour money list winner: 1987
- Old Tom Morris Award: 1989
- Bob Jones Award: 1989

Juan Antonio "Chi-Chi" Rodríguez (October 23, 1935 – August 8, 2024) was a Puerto Rican professional golfer and philanthropist. The winner of eight PGA Tour events, he was the first Puerto Rican to be inducted into the World Golf Hall of Fame.

== Early life ==
Rodríguez was born into a poor family in Rio Piedras, Puerto Rico. He was one of six siblings. His father used to earn $18 a week as a laborer and cattle handler. When Rodríguez was seven years old, he helped the family by earning money as a water carrier on a sugar plantation. One day the young Juan wandered off into a golf course. When he saw that the caddies were earning more money than he was, he decided to become a caddie himself.

Rodríguez would take a branch from a guava tree and turn it into a golf club. Using a metal can as a "golf ball," he would practice what he had seen the "real" golfers do, teaching himself how to play golf. By the time he was nine years old, he was proficient at golf, and in 1947, at the age of 12, he scored a 67.

In 1954, when Rodríguez was 19, he joined the U.S. Army during the Korean War. During his breaks, he would visit whichever golf course was nearby, where he continued to perfect his game.

Rodríguez, with characteristic charisma, would often make jokes about his past hardships on the golf course, such as, "How long does John Daly drive a golf ball? When I was a kid, I didn't go that far on vacation." And, "Playing golf is not hot work. Cutting sugar cane for a dollar a day — that's hot work. Hotter than my first wristwatch."

== Professional career ==
In 1960, Rodríguez turned professional. Three years later, at age 28, Rodríguez won the 1963 Denver Open, which he considered his favorite win. He won eight titles on the PGA Tour between 1963 and 1979.

At first Rodríguez used to put his hat over the hole whenever he made a birdie or eagle. After he heard that other golfers were complaining about his little act, he decided to try something new. Juan developed his signature "toreador dance," where he would make believe that the ball was a "bull" and that his putter was a "sword," and he would terminate the "bull." Even though he was not a large man, he had a special stance and swing with the driver that enabled him to hit the ball as far as the longest drivers on the tour. Rodríguez represented Puerto Rico on 12 World Cup teams.

=== Senior career ===
Rodríguez became eligible to play on the Senior PGA Tour in 1985 and did so for many years with great success, earning 22 tournament victories between 1986 and 1993. He was the first player on the Senior PGA Tour to win the same event in three consecutive years. He set a tour record with eight consecutive birdies en route to a win at the 1987 Silver Pages Classic. In 1991, he lost an 18-hole playoff to Jack Nicklaus in the U.S. Senior Open. Over his three decades competing on the pro circuit, he became one of the most popular players.

== Personal life ==
Rodríguez was married and had a daughter.

On one occasion, Rodríguez had a brief encounter with Mother Teresa, a moment he considered to be the greatest of his life and which inspired him to help others. Together with former professional golfer Bill Hayes and Bob James, Rodríguez established the Chi-Chi Rodríguez Youth Foundation, an afterschool program at the Glen Oaks Golf Course in Clearwater, Florida. The principal idea behind the foundation was to instill self-esteem in young people who are victims of abuse, have experienced minor brushes with the law, or have suffered any other hardships. Rodríguez also bought his mother a house and provided financial aid to his brothers and sisters.

In October 1998, Rodríguez suffered a heart attack. He underwent an angioplasty to clear a blocked artery and made a full recovery.

Rodríguez made a cameo in the movie Welcome to Mooseport (2004), in which he is seen golfing with the United States President, as portrayed by Gene Hackman.

In May 2010, Rodríguez was robbed at his house in Guayama, Puerto Rico, by three men who stole $500,000 worth of money and jewelry. Rodríguez and his wife were awakened at 1:45 in the morning by the masked men, who tied them up and proceeded to rob them.

On March 11, 2012, at the age of 76, Rodríguez participated, as an honorary player, in the Puerto Rico Open. He played 18 holes as his final official round as a professional in the PGA. There were several events honoring Rodríguez associated with the tournament, and the tribute received extensive media coverage.

Rodríguez died on August 8, 2024, at the age of 88. He is buried at the Hawaii State Veterans Cemetery in Kaneohe, Hawaii.

== Awards and honors ==
- In 1986, Rodríguez won the Hispanic Recognition Award.
- In 1988, he was named Replica's Hispanic Man of the Year.
- In 1989, Rodríguez was voted the Bob Jones Award, the highest honor given by the United States Golf Association in recognition of distinguished sportsmanship in golf.
- He received the 1989 Old Tom Morris Award from the Golf Course Superintendents Association of America, GCSAA's highest honor.
- In 1992, Rodríguez was inducted into the World Golf Hall of Fame, the first Puerto Rican so honored.
- In 1993, Rodríguez received the Hispanic Heritage Foundation Sports Award.
- Rodriguez was the 1995 Rose Parade Grand Marshal.

== In popular culture ==
A painted image of Rodriguez was used to sell golf merchandise in the 1970s. The members of the new wave band Devo saw one of these promotional images and decided that it represented the artificiality of popular culture. They used the image in their satirical manifesto (on the de-evolution of humanity) and also featured it on the artwork of their single "Be Stiff", which was released in early 1978, before they had signed to a major label. Four months later, they signed to Warner Bros. Records. For their debut album, Q: Are We Not Men? A: We Are Devo!, they wanted to use Rodriguez's image for the album cover art, but Warner rejected it, due to not having Rodriguez's permission. As the band sought permission, they suggested that the image could be altered to not resemble Rodriguez so closely. Warner's art department slightly changed the ears, eyes, nose and other features and began album production. By the time the band secured Rodriguez's permission, it was too late to use the original one. Warner sent Rodriguez $2,500 and 50 copies of the album, but he only listened to it once, preferring music by vocalists such as Dean Martin.

In 1993, Rodriguez lent his name to the video game Chi Chi's Pro Challenge Golf, published by Virgin Games for the Sega Genesis console.

The 1995 film To Wong Foo, Thanks for Everything! Julie Newmar features a drag queen character named Chi-Chi Rodriguez, played by John Leguizamo. The golfer sued the producers and distributors over the use of his name, later settling out of court for undisclosed amounts.

== Professional wins (37) ==
=== PGA Tour wins (8) ===
No.	Date	Tournament	Winning score	Margin of victory	Runner(s)-up
1	Sep 1, 1963	Denver Open Invitational	−4 (68-74-65-69=276)	2 strokes	(United States) Bill Eggers
2	Jan 27, 1964	Lucky International Open	−12 (72-69-65-66=272)	Playoff	(United States) Don January
3	Aug 9, 1964	Western Open	−16 (64-69-68-67=268)	1 stroke	(United States) Arnold Palmer
4	Apr 30, 1967	Texas Open Invitational	−7 (68-73-70-66=277)	1 stroke	(New Zealand) Bob Charles, (United States) Bob Goalby
5	Oct 20, 1968	Sahara Invitational	−10 (70-71-69-64=274)	Playoff	(United States) Dale Douglass
6	May 1, 1972	Byron Nelson Golf Classic	−7 (66-68-69-70=273)	Playoff	(United States) Billy Casper
7	Apr 2, 1973	Greater Greensboro Open	−17 (68-66-67-66=267)	1 stroke	(United States) Lou Graham, (United States) Ken Still
8	Apr 22, 1979	Tallahassee Open	−19 (66-69-67-67=269)	3 strokes	(United States) Lindy Miller

PGA Tour playoff record (3–1)

No.	Year	Tournament	Opponent	Result
1	1964	Lucky International Open	(United States) Don January	Won 18-hole playoff; Rodríguez: −1 (70), January: E (71)
2	1966	Cajun Classic Open Invitational	(United States) Jacky Cupit	Lost to par on second extra hole
3	1968	Sahara Invitational	(United States) Dale Douglass	Won with par on first extra hole
4	1972	Byron Nelson Golf Classic	(United States) Billy Casper	Won with birdie on first extra hole

=== Other wins (4) ===
- 1963 Colombian Open
- 1976 Pepsi-Cola Mixed Team Championship (with Jo Ann Washam)
- 1979 Bahamas Open, Panama Open (tie with Butch Baird)

=== Senior PGA Tour wins (22) ===
Legend
Senior PGA Tour major championships (2)
Other Senior PGA Tour (20)

No.	Date	Tournament	Winning score	Margin of victory	Runner(s)-up
1	Jun 22, 1986	Senior Tournament Players Championship	−10 (69-67-70=206)*	2 strokes	(Australia) Bruce Crampton
2	Aug 10, 1986	Digital Seniors Classic	−13 (70-67-66=203)	1 stroke	(South Africa) Gary Player
3	Sep 14, 1986	United Virginia Bank Seniors	−14 (69-67-66=202)	3 strokes	(United States) Don January
4	Feb 15, 1987	General Foods PGA Seniors' Championship	−6 (70-69-76-67=282)	1 stroke	(United States) Dale Douglass
5	May 10, 1987	Vantage at The Dominion	−13 (67-67-69=203)	3 strokes	(United States) Butch Baird
6	May 17, 1987	United Hospitals Senior Golf Championship	−8 (70-69-63=202)	1 stroke	(United States) Lee Elder
7	May 24, 1987	Silver Pages Classic	−16 (66-65-69=200)	3 strokes	(Australia) Bruce Crampton
8	Jun 7, 1987	Senior Players Reunion Pro-Am	−15 (67-69-65=201)	1 stroke	(Australia) Bruce Crampton
9	Aug 9, 1987	Digital Seniors Classic (2)	−18 (65-66-67=198)	8 strokes	(United States) Orville Moody
10	Aug 23, 1987	GTE Northwest Classic	−10 (70-68-68=206)	1 stroke	(United States) Butch Baird
11	Apr 17, 1988	Doug Sanders Kingwood Celebrity Classic	−8 (70-69-69=208)	2 strokes	(United States) Miller Barber, (United States) John Brodie
12	Jul 31, 1988	Digital Seniors Classic (3)	−14 (68-65-69=202)	1 stroke	(New Zealand) Bob Charles
13	Sep 17, 1989	Crestar Classic (2)	−13 (66-69-68=203)	1 stroke	(United States) Jim Dent, (United States) Dick Rhyan
14	May 6, 1990	Las Vegas Senior Classic	−12 (68-67-69=204)	1 stroke	(United States) George Archer, (United States) Charles Coody
15	Jul 22, 1990	Ameritech Senior Open	−13 (67-70-66=203)	7 strokes	(United States) George Archer, (United States) Al Kelley
16	Aug 12, 1990	Sunwest Bank Charley Pride Senior Golf Classic	−11 (66-71-68=205)	2 strokes	(United States) Charles Coody, (United States) Jim Dent, (United States) Jim Ferree
17	Mar 3, 1991	GTE West Classic	−8 (66-66=132)*	1 stroke	(Australia) Bruce Crampton, (South Africa) Gary Player
18	Mar 24, 1991	Vintage ARCO Invitational	−10 (70-67-69=206)	1 stroke	(United States) Mike Hill, (United States) Don January
19	May 5, 1991	Las Vegas Senior Classic (2)	−12 (70-68-66=204)	3 strokes	(United States) Walt Zembriski
20	May 12, 1991	Murata Reunion Pro-Am (2)	−8 (71-70-67=208)	Playoff	(United States) Jim Colbert
21	Nov 8, 1992	Ko Olina Senior Invitational	−10 (69-68-69=206)	6 strokes	(United States) Charles Coody
22	Jun 20, 1993	Burnet Senior Classic	−15 (69-67-65=201)	2 strokes	(United States) Jim Colbert, (United States) Bob Murphy

*Note: Tournament shortened to 36/54 holes due to rain.

Senior PGA Tour playoff record (1–7)

No.	Year	Tournament	Opponent(s)	Result
1	1986	Greater Grand Rapids Open	(United States) Jim Ferree, (United States) Gene Littler	Ferree won with birdie on first extra hole
2	1989	Bell Atlantic/St. Christopher's Classic	(United States) Dave Hill	Lost to par on third extra hole
3	1989	General Tire Las Vegas Classic	(United States) Charles Coody, (New Zealand) Bob Charles	Coody won with birdie on second extra hole
4	1990	NYNEX Commemorative	(United States) Mike Fetchick, (United States) Jimmy Powell, (United States) Lee Trevino	Trevino won with birdie on fifth extra hole Powell and Rodríguez eliminated by birdie on first hole
5	1991	Murata Reunion Pro-Am	(United States) Jim Colbert	Won with par on fourth extra hole
6	1991	U.S. Senior Open	(United States) Jack Nicklaus	Lost 18-hole playoff; Nicklaus: −5 (65), Rodríguez: −1 (69)
7	1991	Security Pacific Senior Classic	(United States) George Archer, (United States) John Brodie	Brodie won with birdie on first extra hole
8	1993	First of America Classic	(United States) George Archer, (United States) Jim Colbert	Archer won with par on third extra hole Rodríguez eliminated by par on first hole

=== Other senior wins (3) ===
- 1988 Japan PGA Senior Championship, Senior Skins Game
- 1989 Senior Skins Game

== Results in major championships ==
Tournament	1961	1962	1963	1964	1965	1966	1967	1968	1969
Masters Tournament	CUT	T33	CUT	T21	CUT		T26		
U.S. Open				WD	T40	T44	T42		
The Open Championship									
PGA Championship				T44	T71				T15

Tournament	1970	1971	1972	1973	1974	1975	1976	1977	1978	1979
Masters Tournament	T10	T30	CUT	T10	T20	CUT				
U.S. Open	T27	T13	T9	T29	T26		CUT	60	T46	T32
The Open Championship				T28						
PGA Championship	CUT	T66	T24	T24	T39	T22		CUT		T46

Tournament	1980	1981	1982
Masters Tournament	T44		T38
U.S. Open	CUT	T6	CUT
The Open Championship			
PGA Championship	WD		

Top 10
Did not play

CUT = missed the half-way cut
WD = withdrew
"T" indicates a tie for a place

=== Summary ===
Tournament	Wins	2nd	3rd	Top-5	Top-10	Top-25	Events	Cuts made
Masters Tournament	0	0	0	0	2	4	14	9
U.S. Open	0	0	0	0	2	3	16	12
The Open Championship	0	0	0	0	0	0	1	1
PGA Championship	0	0	0	0	0	4	12	9
Totals	0	0	0	0	4	11	43	31

- Most consecutive cuts made – 9 (1972 U.S. Open – 1974 PGA)
- Longest streak of top-10s – 1 (four times)

== Senior major championships ==
=== Wins (2) ===
Year	Championship	Winning score	Margin	Runner-up
1986	Senior Tournament Players Championship	−10 (69-67-70=206)	2 strokes	(Australia) Bruce Crampton
1987	General Foods PGA Seniors' Championship	−6 (70-69-76-67=282)	1 stroke	(United States) Dale Douglass

=== Results timeline ===
Tournament	1986	1987	1988	1989	1990	1991	1992	1993	1994	1995	1996
The Tradition	NYF	NYF	NYF	T7	T48	T6	3	T30	T37	WD	T12
Senior PGA Championship	T5	1	2	T19	2	T12	3	T32	T5	T26	T4
Senior Players Championship	1	T2	T26	T10	T5	T25	4	T20	T32		T13
U.S. Senior Open	T10	3	T6	T18	T3	2	7	T4	T32	T29	T17

Tournament	1997	1998	1999	2000	2001	2002	2003	2004	2005	2006
The Tradition	T43	70	T65	WD	T67		78			
Senior PGA Championship	T27	CUT				CUT				
Senior Players Championship	T34	T50	T33	T60	73					77
U.S. Senior Open	T21	CUT	CUT	T37	CUT					

Win
Top 10
Did not play

NYF = Tournament not yet founded
CUT = missed the half-way cut
WD = withdrew
"T" indicates a tie for a place.

Note: Rodríguez never played in the Senior Open Championship.

== Team appearances ==
- World Cup (representing Puerto Rico): 1961, 1962, 1963, 1964, 1965, 1966, 1967, 1968, 1971, 1974, 1976, 1993
- Ryder Cup (representing the United States): 1973 (winners)
- Wendy's 3-Tour Challenge (representing Senior PGA Tour): 1992, 1993 (winners)

== See also ==
- List of Puerto Ricans
- List of golfers with most Champions Tour wins
