= Al Geiberger =

American professional golfer (born 1937)

Personal information
- Full name: Allen Lee Geiberger Sr.
- Nickname: Mr. 59, Skippy
- Nationality: United States
- Born: September 1, 1937 (age 89) Red Bluff, California, U.S.
- Height: 6 ft 2 in (1.88 m)
- Weight: 180 lb (82 kg; 13 st)

Career
- Sport: Golf
- College: University of Southern California
- Turned professional: 1959
- Former tours: PGA Tour; Champions Tour
- Professional wins: 30

Number of wins by tour
- PGA Tour: 11
- Japan Golf Tour: 1
- PGA Tour Champions: 10
- Other: 8

Best results in major championships (wins: 1)
- Masters Tournament: T12: 1972
- PGA Championship: Won: 1966
- U.S. Open: T2: 1969, 1976
- The Open Championship: T13: 1974

Achievements and awards
- Senior PGA Tour Comeback Player of the Year: 1996

Allen Lee Geiberger Sr. (born September 1, 1937) is an American former professional golfer, known for winning the 1966 PGA Championship.

== Early life ==
In 1937, Geiberger was born in Red Bluff, California, the son of Ray and Mabel Geiberger. His first big tournament win was the 1954 National Jaycee Championship. In 1955, Geiberger graduated from Santa Barbara High School and then attended Menlo College. In 1959, he graduated from the University of Southern California.

== Professional career ==
In 1959, Geiberger turned professional. The following year, he joined the PGA Tour. Geiberger won 11 tournaments on the PGA Tour, the first being the 1962 Ontario Open and the biggest being the 1966 PGA Championship, a major title. He won the Tournament Players Championship in 1975, and played on the Ryder Cup teams in 1967 and 1975. Geiberger also won 10 times on the Senior PGA Tour.

During the second round of the Danny Thomas Memphis Classic in 1977, Geiberger became the first player in history to post a score of 59 (−13) in a PGA Tour-sanctioned event. Starting on the tenth tee of the Colonial Country Club in Cordova, Tennessee, he shot a bogey-free round of six pars, 11 birdies, and an eagle on the 7,193-yard (6,577 m) layout. He sank a forty-foot (12 m) putt for birdie on his opening hole, and ended the round with a birdie from eight feet (2.4 m); the lone eagle was a holed-out wedge shot.

Geiberger won the tournament, though not handily. He shot even-par 72 in the first and third rounds, and was two strokes down to Gary Player on Sunday after a 38 (+2) on the front nine put him at 241 (−11) for 63 holes. He regained the lead with a 32 (−4) on the back nine to finish at 273 (−15), two strokes ahead of Player and Jerry McGee.

Scorecard: Friday, June 10, 1977

Hole	10	11	12	13	14	15	16	17	18	1	2	3	4	5	6	7	8	9
Par	4	4	3	4	4	3	5	4	5	5	4	3	4	3	4	5	4	4
Score	3	4	2	4	4	2	4	3	4	3	3	2	4	3	3	4	4	3
To par	−1	−1	−2	−2	−2	−3	−4	−5	−6	−8	−9	−10	−10	−10	−11	−12	−12	−13

== Personal life ==
Geiberger has six children. His son Brent Geiberger is also a professional golfer who won two PGA Tour events. Another son, John, was the coach of the Pepperdine University golf team from 1996 to 2012, and won the NCAA Championship in 1997.

Geiberger's father was one of the victims of the Tenerife airport disaster in 1977.

Geiberger had surgery in 1980 to remove his colon due to inflammatory bowel disease and has an ileostomy.

== Professional wins (30) ==
=== PGA Tour wins (11) ===
Legend
Major championships (1)
Players Championships (1)
Other PGA Tour (9)

No.	Date	Tournament	Winning score	To par	Margin of victory	Runner(s)-up
1	Oct 21, 1962	Ontario Open Invitational	69-67-70-70=276	−8	1 stroke	(United States) Gardner Dickinson, (United States) Bob Goalby, (United States) Tommy Jacobs, (United States) Chuck Rotar, (United States) John Ruedi
2	Nov 3, 1963	Almaden Open Invitational	69-67-67-74=277	−11	1 stroke	(United States) Dutch Harrison, (United States) Dick Lotz
3	Aug 29, 1965	American Golf Classic	70-69-69-72=280	E	4 strokes	(United States) Arnold Palmer
4	Jul 24, 1966	PGA Championship	68-72-68-72=280	E	4 strokes	(United States) Dudley Wysong
5	Oct 6, 1974	Sahara Invitational	70-68-66-69=273	−11	3 strokes	(United States) Wally Armstrong, (United States) Jerry Heard, (United States) Dave Hill, (United States) Mike Hill
6	Apr 27, 1975	MONY Tournament of Champions	67-67-70-73=277	−11	Playoff	(South Africa) Gary Player
7	Aug 24, 1975	Tournament Players Championship	66-68-67-69=270	−10	3 strokes	(United States) Dave Stockton
8	Apr 4, 1976	Greater Greensboro Open	70-65-65-68=268	−16	2 strokes	(United States) Lee Trevino
9	Jun 27, 1976	Western Open	71-71-73-73=288	+4	1 stroke	(United States) Joe Porter
10	Jun 12, 1977	Danny Thomas Memphis Classic	72-59-72-70=273	−15	2 strokes	(United States) Jerry McGee, (South Africa) Gary Player
11	May 20, 1979	Colonial National Invitation	68-69-64-73=274	−6	1 stroke	(United States) Don January, (United States) Gene Littler

PGA Tour playoff record (1–1)

No.	Year	Tournament	Opponent	Result
1	1967	Carling World Open	(United States) Billy Casper	Lost to par on first extra hole
2	1975	MONY Tournament of Champions	(South Africa) Gary Player	Won with birdie on first extra hole

=== PGA of Japan Tour wins (1) ===
No.	Date	Tournament	Winning score	To par	Margin of victory	Runner-up
1	Nov 25, 1973	ABC Japan vs USA Golf Matches	72-70-76=218	+2	2 strokes	(Japan) Takashi Murakami

=== Other wins (6) ===
- 1961 Utah Open
- 1962 Caracas Open, Almaden Open Invitational
- 1979 Spalding Invitational
- 1982 Frontier Airlines Open
- 1985 Colorado Open

=== Senior PGA Tour wins (10) ===
No.	Date	Tournament	Winning score	To par	Margin of victory	Runner(s)-up
1	Oct 4, 1987	Vantage Championship	72-67-67=206	−4	2 strokes	(United States) Dave Hill
2	Oct 18, 1987	Seniors International Golf Championship	70-68-71=209	−4	Playoff	(United States) Jim Ferree
3	Oct 25, 1987	Las Vegas Senior Classic	68-73-62=203	−13	4 strokes	(United States) Chi-Chi Rodríguez
4	Mar 20, 1988	Pointe/Del E. Webb Arizona Classic	63-69-67=199	−17	1 stroke	(United States) Orville Moody
5	Aug 20, 1989	GTE Northwest Classic	68-68-68=204	−12	3 strokes	(United States) Frank Beard
6	Jul 7, 1991	Kroger Senior Classic	66-69-68=203	−10	1 stroke	(United States) Larry Laoretti
7	Jan 12, 1992	Infiniti Senior Tournament of Champions	71-67-71-73=282	−6	3 strokes	(Australia) Bruce Crampton, (United States) Chi-Chi Rodríguez
8	Jan 10, 1993	Infiniti Senior Tournament of Champions (2)	70-70-69-71=280	−8	2 strokes	(United States) Jim Dent
9	Mar 7, 1993	GTE West Classic	67-65-66=198	−12	2 strokes	(Japan) Isao Aoki, (United States) George Archer
10	Feb 11, 1996	Greater Naples IntelliNet Challenge	68-63-71=202	−14	1 stroke	(Japan) Isao Aoki

Senior PGA Tour playoff record (1-1)

No.	Year	Tournament	Opponent(s)	Result
1	1987	Seniors International Golf Championship	(United States) Jim Ferree	Won with birdie on second extra hole
2	1999	Toshiba Senior Classic	(United States) Allen Doyle, (United States) John Jacobs, (United States) Gary McCord	McCord won with birdie on fifth extra hole Doyle and Geiberger eliminated by eagle on first hole

=== Other senior wins (2) ===
- 1989 Liberty Mutual Legends of Golf (with Harold Henning)
- 2008 Liberty Mutual Legends of Golf - Demaret Division (with Jimmy Powell)

== Major championships ==
=== Wins (1) ===
Year	Championship	54 holes	Winning score	Margin	Runner-up
1966	PGA Championship	4 shot lead	E (68-72-68-72=280)	4 strokes	(United States) Dudley Wysong

=== Results timeline ===
Tournament	1961	1962	1963	1964	1965	1966	1967	1968	1969
Masters Tournament		CUT		T13	T24	T44	T36	T30	T13
U.S. Open	T12	CUT	CUT	T14	T4	T30	T28	T9	T2
The Open Championship									
PGA Championship			T5	T19	19	1	T5	T8	T35

Tournament	1970	1971	1972	1973	1974	1975	1976	1977	1978	1979
Masters Tournament	T45	T24	T12	T37	T31	CUT	T15	CUT	T42	
U.S. Open	CUT	T55	T21	T13	T18	T38	T2	T10	T53	T19
The Open Championship					T13	CUT				
PGA Championship	T16	T30	CUT	T18	8	T33	CUT	T6	CUT	T65

Tournament	1980	1981	1982	1983	1984	1985	1986	1987	1988	1989
Masters Tournament	CUT									
U.S. Open	CUT									
The Open Championship										
PGA Championship		T67	CUT	CUT	CUT	T74				

Tournament	1990	1991	1992	1993	1994	1995	1996	1997	1998
Masters Tournament									
U.S. Open									
The Open Championship									
PGA Championship									CUT

Win
Top 10
Did not play

CUT = missed the halfway cut
"T" indicates a tie for a place.

=== Summary ===
Tournament	Wins	2nd	3rd	Top-5	Top-10	Top-25	Events	Cuts made
Masters Tournament	0	0	0	0	0	6	17	13
U.S. Open	0	2	0	3	5	11	20	16
The Open Championship	0	0	0	0	0	1	2	1
PGA Championship	1	0	0	3	6	10	23	16
Totals	1	2	0	6	11	28	62	46

- Most consecutive cuts made – 20 (1963 PGA – 1970 Masters)
- Longest streak of top-10s – 2 (twice)

== The Players Championship ==
=== Wins (1) ===
Year	Championship	54 holes	Winning score	Margin	Runner-up
1975	Tournament Players Championship	3 shot lead	−10 (66-68-67-69=270)	3 strokes	(United States) Dave Stockton

=== Results timeline ===
Tournament	1974	1975	1976	1977	1978	1979	1980	1981	1982	1983	1984
The Players Championship	T24	1	T24	CUT		T67				T56	CUT

Win
Did not play

CUT = missed the halfway cut
"T" indicates a tie for a place.

== See also ==
- List of golfers with most Champions Tour wins
- List of men's major championships winning golfers
- Lowest rounds of golf
