= Walt Zembriski =

American professional golfer

Personal information
- Full name: Walter Zembriski
- Nationality: United States
- Born: May 24, 1935 (age 91) Mahwah, New Jersey, U.S.

Career
- Sport: Golf
- Status: Professional
- Former tours: PGA Tour; Champions Tour
- Professional wins: 3

Number of wins by tour
- PGA Tour Champions: 3

Best results in major championships
- Masters Tournament: DNP
- PGA Championship: DNP
- U.S. Open: 61st: 1978
- The Open Championship: DNP

Walter Zembriski (born May 24, 1935) is an American professional golfer who played on the PGA Tour and the Senior PGA Tour.

== Early life ==
Zembriski was born in Mahwah, New Jersey. He taught himself how to play golf while working as a caddie at the Out of Bounds Golf Club in Mahwah. His father, Stanley, also worked as a caddie at the same club, and caddied regularly for Babe Ruth.

== Professional career ==
Zembriski earned playing privileges at the 1966 PGA Tour Qualifying School. He had a brief stint as a member of the PGA Tour during this era. During his middle and late thirties, he worked as an ironworker on highrise buildings along the Jersey Shore. During his forties, Zembriski played on the Florida mini-tour. He qualified twice for the U.S. Open during this period, in 1978 and 1982.

Zembriski's greatest success in professional golf came on the Senior PGA Tour, where he won three times.

== Personal life ==
Zembriski now lives in Orlando, Florida and still plays golf regularly.

== Amateur wins ==
this list is probably incomplete

- 1964 Ike Tournament
- 1965 New Jersey Amateur

== Professional wins (3) ==
=== Senior PGA Tour wins (3) ===
No.	Date	Tournament	Winning score	Margin of victory	Runner(s)-up
1	Jul 23, 1988	Newport Cup	−9 (67-65=132) (Note: Shortened to 36 holes due to weather.)	2 strokes	(United States) Charles Coody
2	Oct 9, 1988	Vantage Championship	−10 (73-68-67=70=278)	3 strokes	(United States) Al Geiberger, (United States) Dave Hill, (United States) Dick Rhyan
2	Dec 2, 1989	GTE West Classic	−13 (64-68-65=197)	2 strokes	(United States) George Archer, (United States) Jim Dent

Senior PGA Tour playoff record (0–2)

No.	Year	Tournament	Opponent(s)	Result
1	1985	Citizens Union Senior Golf Classic	(United States) Lee Elder, (United States) Orville Moody, (United States) Dan Sikes	Elder won with birdie on third extra hole Moody eliminated by birdie on second hole
2	1992	Digital Seniors Classic	(United States) Mike Hill	Lost to par on second extra hole

== See also ==
- 1966 PGA Tour Qualifying School graduates
