= Bass Pro Shops Legends of Golf =

Coordinates: 36.5757°N 93.1940°W

Bass Pro Shops Legends of Golf at Big Cedar

Tournament information
- Location: Ridgedale, Missouri, U.S.
- Established: 1978
- Course(s): Buffalo Ridge Golf Course; Top of the Rock
- Par: 71 (BR); 39 (MT); 27 (TR)
- Length: 6,963 yards (6,367 m) (BR); 1,912 yards (1,748 m) (MT); 2,659 yards (2,431 m) (TR)
- Tour(s): PGA Tour Champions (since 2002)
- Format: Stroke play – no cut 67 holes (age 50–65); 58 holes (over 65)
- Prize fund: $1.8 million
- Month played: April

Current champion
- (United States) Scott Hoch and (United States) Tom Pernice Jr.

Location in the United States
Location in Missouri

The Bass Pro Shops Legends of Golf at Big Cedar was a golf tournament on the PGA Tour Champions. From 2014 to 2019, it was played at Big Cedar Lodge in Ridgedale, Missouri, on the par-3 Top of the Rock course, designed by Jack Nicklaus and the 18-hole Buffalo Ridge course, redesigned by Tom Fazio. The tournament was sponsored by Bass Pro Shops, which owns the Big Cedar Lodge. It is often called "The tournament that launched the Champions Tour". Starting in 2018, a second par-3 course, Mountain Top, a 13-hole course designed by Gary Player, was added to the tournament, which has the oddity of being a 67-hole tournament.

From 1978 until 2012, it was known as the Liberty Mutual Insurance Legends of Golf. Prior to Big Cedar Lodge, it was played in Savannah, Georgia, at The Club at Savannah Harbor. Liberty Mutual was the main sponsor of the tournament.

In its final years, it consisted of two separate events using four-ball and alternate shot formats with two-man teams: the 67-hole Champions Division (age 50–65) and the 58-hole Legends Division (age 65+) (on the final day of the tournament, held at Top of the Rock, Legends played the course once, while Champions played the course twice). Only the Champions Division event was an official money/official victory event.

For 2002 to 2013, it consisted of three separate events: the Legends Division is a 54-hole two-man team better-ball event for men over 50, the Raphael Division is a 36-hole two-man team better-ball event for men age 50–69, and the Demaret Division is a 36-hole two-man team better-ball event for men over 70. Only the Legends Division event was an official money/official victory event.

From 2014 until 2016, the tournament was held over 54 holes, one round at Buffalo Ridge, and four nine-hole rounds at Top of the Rock. In 2017, because of weather that washed out play and made the full Buffalo Ridge course unplayable, all 36 (or 27) holes were played at Top of the Rock, the first time a PGA Tour event was held exclusively on a Par 3 course.

The tournament was founded in 1978 and consisted of a 72-hole two-man team better-ball event for men over 50. Its success provided impetus for the formation of the Senior PGA Tour in 1980. In 1987, a Legendary Division was added. This consisted of a 36-hole two-man team better-ball event for men over 60. These teams also competed in the Legends Division - Charles Coody & Dale Douglass won both divisions in 1998. In 1993, the 36-hole Demaret Division (named after tournament co-founder Jimmy Demaret) was added for men over 70. For this year alone, all three divisions were competed at individual stroke play. In 2002 the Legends Division became an individual stroke play event and became an official money event on the Champions Tour. This format remained through 2007. The Legendary Division was renamed the Raphael Division (after tournament co-founder Fred Raphael who had died in 2001) and became the 36-hole two-man team better-ball event for men over 60.

The purse for the 2019 tournament was $1.8 million, with $171,000 going to each member of the winning team.

== Tournament hosts ==
The tournament has been played in several different locations since its founding.

Years	Course	City
2014–2019	Big Cedar Lodge	Ridgedale, Missouri
2003–2013	The Club at Savannah Harbor	Savannah, Georgia
1999–2002	World Golf Village (King & Bear courses)	St. Augustine, Florida
1998	Summer Beach Golf Resort	Amelia Island, Florida
1995–1997	PGA West (Stadium Course)	La Quinta, California
1990–1994	Barton Creek Conference Center	Austin, Texas
1978–1989	Onion Creek Club	Austin, Texas

== Team winners ==
Champions Tour event (Legends Division 2002–2013, Champions Division 2014– )
Unofficial money event (Raphael Division 2002–2013, Demaret Division 2002–2013, Legends Division 2014–2017)

Year	Champions Division (50–65)	Legends Division (65+)	
2020	No tournament		
2019	Scott Hoch & Tom Pernice Jr.		
2018	Paul Broadhurst & Kirk Triplett		
2017	Carlos Franco & Vijay Singh	Allen Doyle & Hubert Green	
2016	Michael Allen & Woody Austin	Bruce Fleisher & Larry Nelson	
2015	Billy Andrade & Joe Durant	Bruce Fleisher & Larry Nelson	
2014	Fred Funk & Jeff Sluman	Jim Colbert & Jim Thorpe	
Year	Legends Division (over 50's)	Raphael Division (60–69)	Demaret Division (over 70's)
2013	Brad Faxon & Jeff Sluman	Ian Baker-Finch & Bart Bryant	Jim Colbert & Bob Murphy
2012	Michael Allen & David Frost	Mark James & Des Smyth	Gibby Gilbert & J. C. Snead
2011	Mark McNulty & David Eger	Mark James & Des Smyth	Gibby Gilbert & J. C. Snead
2010	Mark O'Meara & Nick Price	John Bland & Graham Marsh	Gary Player & Bob Charles
2009	Bernhard Langer & Tom Lehman	Gary Koch & Roger Maltbie	Gary Player & Bob Charles
2008	Andy North & Tom Watson	Gary Koch & Roger Maltbie	Al Geiberger & Jimmy Powell
2007	Jay Haas	Andy North & Tom Watson	Butch Baird & Bobby Nichols
2006	Jay Haas	Andy North & Tom Watson	Orville Moody & Jimmy Powell
2005	Des Smyth	Andy North & Tom Watson	Orville Moody & Jimmy Powell
2004	Hale Irwin	Bob Charles & Stewart Ginn	Don January & Gene Littler
2003	Bruce Lietzke	Gary Koch & Roger Maltbie	Miller Barber & Jim Ferree
2002	Doug Tewell	Bruce Lietzke & Bill Rogers	Miller Barber & Jim Ferree

Unofficial money event (1978–2001)

Year	Legends Division (over 50's)	Legendary Division (over 60's)	Demaret Division (over 70's)
2001	Jim Colbert & Andy North	Jim Albus & Simon Hobday	Don January & Gene Littler
2000	Jim Colbert & Andy North	Mike Hill & Lee Trevino	Joe Jimenez & Charlie Sifford
1999	Hubert Green & Gil Morgan	Orville Moody & Jimmy Powell	Joe Jimenez & Charlie Sifford
1998	Charles Coody & Dale Douglass	Charles Coody & Dale Douglass	Joe Jimenez & Charlie Sifford
1997	John Bland & Graham Marsh	Don January & Gene Littler	George Bayer & Jim Ferree
1996	Mike Hill & Lee Trevino	Orville Moody & Jimmy Powell	Doug Ford & Art Wall Jr.
1995	Mike Hill & Lee Trevino	Orville Moody & Jimmy Powell	Tommy Bolt & Jack Fleck
1994	Charles Coody & Dale Douglass	Don January & Gene Littler	Al Balding & Jay Hebert
1992	Mike Hill & Lee Trevino	Mike Fetchick & Bob Toski	
1991	Mike Hill & Lee Trevino	Roberto De Vicenzo & Charlie Sifford	
1990	Charles Coody & Dale Douglass	Mike Fetchick & Bob Toski	
1989	Al Geiberger & Harold Henning	Roberto De Vicenzo & Charlie Sifford	
1988	Bruce Crampton & Orville Moody	Roberto De Vicenzo & Charlie Sifford	
1987	Bruce Crampton & Orville Moody	Jerry Barber & Doug Ford	
1986	Don January & Gene Littler		
1985	Don January & Gene Littler		
1984	Gay Brewer & Billy Casper		
1983	Roberto De Vicenzo & Rod Funseth		
1982	Don January & Sam Snead		
1981	Gene Littler & Bob Rosburg		
1980	Tommy Bolt & Art Wall Jr.		
1979	Julius Boros & Roberto De Vicenzo		
1978	Gardner Dickinson & Sam Snead		

=== Individual winners ===
Year	Winner	Tournament	Margin of victory	Runner-up
1993	Harold Henning	Legends of Golf Legends Division	Playoff	Don January, Tom Weiskopf
1993	Don January	Legends of Golf Legendary Division	2 strokes	Roberto De Vicenzo, Gay Brewer
1993	Jerry Barber	Legends of Golf Demaret Division	10 strokes	Kel Nagle

=== Multiple winners ===
The following teams have won multiple times through 2017:

Team	Total	Legends/Champions	Raphael/Legends	Demaret
Don January & Gene Littler	6	2	2	2
Mike Hill & Lee Trevino	5	4	1	
Orville Moody & Jimmy Powell	5		3	2
Andy North & Tom Watson	4	1	3	
Charles Coody & Dale Douglass	3	2	1	
Roberto De Vicenzo & Charlie Sifford	3		3	
Gary Koch & Roger Maltbie	3		3	
Joe Jimenez & Charlie Sifford	3			3
Jim Colbert & Andy North	2	2		
Bruce Crampton & Orville Moody	2	2		
John Bland & Graham Marsh	2	1	1	
Mike Fetchick & Bob Toski	2		2	
Mark James & Des Smyth	2		2	
Miller Barber & Jim Ferree	2			2
Gibby Gilbert & J. C. Snead	2			2
Gary Player & Bob Charles	2			2
Larry Nelson & Bruce Fleisher	2		2	

The following individuals have won multiple times (as part of a team or individually) through 2017:

Player	Total	Legends/Champions	Raphael/Legends	Demaret
Don January	8	3	3	2
Gene Littler	7	3	2	2
Orville Moody	7	2	3	2
Andy North	6	3	3	
Jimmy Powell	6		3	3
Charlie Sifford	6		3	3
Mike Hill	5	4	1	
Lee Trevino	5	4	1	
Roberto De Vicenzo	5	2	3	
Charles Coody	4	3	1	
Dale Douglass	4	3	1	
Jim Colbert	4	2	1	1
Tom Watson	4	1	3	
Des Smyth	3	1	2	
Gary Koch	3		3	
Roger Maltbie	3		3	
Bob Charles	3		1	2
Jim Ferree	3			3
Joe Jimenez	3			3
Michael Allen	2	2		
Bruce Crampton	2	2		
Jay Haas	2	2		
Harold Henning	2	2		
Jeff Sluman	2	2		
Sam Snead	2	2		
John Bland	2	1	1	
Hubert Green	2	1	1	
Bruce Lietzke	2	1	1	
Graham Marsh	2	1	1	
Tommy Bolt	2	1		1
Al Geiberger	2	1		1
Art Wall Jr.	2	1		1
Mike Fetchick	2		2	
Mark James	2		2	
Bob Toski	2		2	
Jerry Barber	2		1	1
Doug Ford	2		1	1
Miller Barber	2			2
Gibby Gilbert	2			2
Gary Player	2			2
J. C. Snead	2			2
