= Newport Cup =

Newport Cup may refer to:

- Newport Cup (golf), a golf tournament on the Champions Tour from 1987 to 1992 held at the Newport Country Club
- Newport Cup (polo), an alternative name for the International Polo Cup
- Newport Cup (yachting), New York Harbor race
