= Larry Gilbert =

American golfer (1942–1998)

Personal information
- Full name: Lawrence Allen Gilbert, Sr.
- Nationality: United States
- Born: November 19, 1942 Fort Knox, Kentucky, U.S.
- Died: January 21, 1998 (aged 55) Lexington, Kentucky, U.S.

Career
- Sport: Golf
- College: Middle Tennessee State University
- Status: Professional
- Former tour: Champions Tour
- Professional wins: 21

Number of wins by tour
- PGA Tour Champions: 3
- Other: 18

Best results in major championships
- Masters Tournament: DNP
- PGA Championship: 73rd: 1983
- U.S. Open: CUT: 1976, 1978, 1979
- The Open Championship: DNP

Lawrence Allen Gilbert Sr. (November 19, 1942 – January 21, 1998) was an American professional golfer. He is best known for winning the 1997 Senior Players Championship, one of the major championships on the Senior PGA Tour.

== Early life and amateur career ==
In 1942, Gilbert was born in Fort Knox, Kentucky. He attended Middle Tennessee State University in Murfreesboro, Tennessee and was a distinguished member of the golf team. In 1965, Gilbert led Middle Tennessee State to victory in the 1965 NCAA Division II Men's Golf Championships; Gilbert won the individual medal too.

== Professional career ==
Gilbert spent most of his regular career years as a club pro in Kentucky and Tennessee. He won the PGA Club Professional Championship three times: in 1981, 1982 and 1991. He also won ten Kentucky PGA Championships, three Kentucky Opens, one Tennessee Open, and one Tennessee PGA Championship.

In 1992, he joined the Senior PGA Tour upon turning 50 in 1992.

== Personal life ==
In 1998, Gilbert died in Lexington, Kentucky of lung cancer at the age of 55. He had started smoking cigarettes at an early age, and was often seen smoking a cigar while playing. He won the Senior Players Championship only 192 days before he died.

== Awards and honors ==
- In 1992, Gilbert was inducted into the Kentucky Golf Hall of Fame.
- During his career, Gilbert was inducted into the Middle Tennessee State University Athletics Hall of Fame.

== Professional wins (21) ==
=== Regular career wins (18) ===
- 1968 Kentucky Open
- 1970 Tennessee Open
- 1971 Tennessee PGA Championship
- 1974 Kentucky PGA Championship
- 1975 Kentucky Open
- 1976 Kentucky Open
- 1979 Kentucky PGA Championship
- 1980 Kentucky PGA Championship
- 1981 PGA Club Professional Championship, Kentucky PGA Championship
- 1982 PGA Club Professional Championship, Kentucky PGA Championship
- 1984 Kentucky PGA Championship, Kentucky PGA Match Play Championship
- 1985 Kentucky PGA Championship
- 1986 Kentucky PGA Match Play Championship
- 1990 Kentucky PGA Championship
- 1991 PGA Club Professional Championship

=== Senior PGA Tour wins (3) ===
Legend
Senior PGA Tour major championships (1)
Other Senior PGA Tour (2)

No.	Date	Tournament	Winning score	Margin of victory	Runner(s)-up
1	Apr 24, 1994	Dallas Reunion Pro-Am	−8 (67-68-67=202)	1 stroke	(United States) George Archer, (United States) Rocky Thompson
2	Oct 2, 1994	Vantage Championship	−18 (66-66-66=198)	1 stroke	(United States) Raymond Floyd
3	Jul 13, 1997	Ford Senior Players Championship	−14 (67-68-72-67=274)	3 strokes	(Japan) Isao Aoki, (United States) Bob Dickson, (United States) Jack Kiefer, (United States) Dave Stockton

Senior PGA Tour playoff record (0–1)

No.	Year	Tournament	Opponents	Result
1	1997	Home Depot Invitational	(United States) Jim Dent, (United States) Lee Trevino	Dent won with birdie on second extra hole Gilbert eliminated by birdie on first hole

== Champions Tour major championships ==
=== Wins (1) ===
Year	Championship	Winning score	Margin	Runners-up
1997	Ford Senior Players Championship	−14 (67-68-72-67=274)	3 strokes	(Japan) Isao Aoki, (United States) Bob Dickson, (United States) Jack Kiefer, (United States) Dave Stockton

== U.S. national team appearances ==
- PGA Cup: 1976 (winners), 1977 (tie), 1981 (tie), 1982 (winners), 1983, 1992 (winners)
