= Jimmy Powell (golfer) =

American professional golfer (1935–2021)

Personal information
- Nationality: United States
- Born: January 17, 1935 Dallas, Texas, U.S.
- Died: January 16, 2021 (aged 85) La Quinta, California, U.S.

Career
- Sport: Golf
- College: North Texas State University
- Turned professional: 1959
- Former tours: PGA Tour; Champions Tour
- Professional wins: 14

Number of wins by tour
- PGA Tour Champions: 4
- Other: 10

Best results in major championships
- Masters Tournament: DNP
- PGA Championship: T33: 1975
- U.S. Open: CUT: 1959, 1961, 1972
- The Open Championship: DNP

Jimmy Powell (January 17, 1935 – January 16, 2021) was an American professional golfer who played on the PGA Tour in the 1960s and 1970s, but whose greatest success came on the Senior PGA Tour in the early to mid-1990s.

== Career ==
Powell was born in Dallas, Texas. He graduated from Dallas' Sunset High School and attended North Texas State University. He turned pro in 1959. He was the golf pro at Stevens Park Golf Course in Dallas during the 1980s.

Powell had limited success during the regular phase of his career, but won several official and unofficial events as a senior. In 1995, Powell became the first player to ever win both the Super Seniors competition and the Senior PGA Tour event at the same tournament. He accomplished this at the 1995 First of America Classic. He holds or shares several other Champions Tour records.

Powell lived much of his adult life in La Quinta, California. He was involved in a golf course design business with Harold Heers; the courses they have designed are mainly in the western United States.

== Professional wins (14) ==
=== Regular career wins (3) ===
- 1968 Southern California PGA Championship
- 1970 Southern California PGA Championship
- 1991 Southern California PGA Championship

=== Senior PGA Tour wins (4) ===
No.	Date	Tournament	Winning score	Margin of victory	Runner(s)-up
1	May 13, 1990	Southwestern Bell Classic	−8 (72-71-65=208)	1 stroke	(United States) Jim Dent, (United States) Terry Dill, (United States) Mike Hill, (United States) Rives McBee
2	Feb 9, 1992	Aetna Challenge	−19 (67-65-65=197)	4 strokes	(United States) Lee Trevino
3	Jul 23, 1995	First of America Classic	−15 (68-66-67=201)	5 strokes	(United States) Babe Hiskey
4	Sep 22, 1996	Brickyard Crossing Championship	−10 (68-66=134) (Note: Shortened to 36 holes due to weather.)	1 stroke	(United States) John Jacobs

Senior PGA Tour playoff record (0–2)

No.	Year	Tournament	Opponents	Result
1	1989	Gatlin Brothers Southwest Senior Classic	(United States) George Archer, (United States) Orville Moody	Archer won with par on second extra hole
2	1990	NYNEX Commemorative	(United States) Mike Fetchick, (United States) Chi-Chi Rodríguez, (United States) Lee Trevino	Trevino won with birdie on fifth extra hole Powell and Rodríguez eliminated by birdie on first hole

=== Other senior wins (7) ===
- 1995 First of America Classic (Super Seniors event), Liberty Mutual Legends of Golf - Legendary Division (with Orville Moody)
- 1996 Liberty Mutual Legends of Golf - Legendary Division (with Orville Moody)
- 1999 Liberty Mutual Legends of Golf - Legendary Division (with Orville Moody)
- 2005 Liberty Mutual Legends of Golf - Demaret Division (with Orville Moody)
- 2006 Liberty Mutual Legends of Golf - Demaret Division (with Orville Moody)
- 2008 Liberty Mutual Legends of Golf - Demaret Division (with Al Geiberger)
