= Al Kelley =

American golfer

Personal information
- Full name: Albert Lee Kelley Jr.
- Nationality: United States
- Born: February 9, 1935
- Died: December 17, 2017 (aged 82) Eustis, Florida

Career
- Sport: Golf
- Turned professional: 1962
- Former tours: PGA Tour; Champions Tour
- Professional wins: 1

Number of wins by tour
- PGA Tour Champions: 1

Best results in major championships
- Masters Tournament: DNP
- PGA Championship: T55: 1971
- U.S. Open: CUT: 1978
- The Open Championship: DNP

Albert Lee Kelley Jr. (February 9, 1935 – December 17, 2017) was an American professional golfer. Kelley played on the PGA Tour in the 1960s and found success on the Senior PGA Tour over 20 years later.

== Amateur career ==
Kelley won 18 titles before becoming a professional, including the Florida Amateur championship (1960, 1962) and the Air Force World Wide title (1962).

== Professional career ==
In 1962, Kelley turned professional. In his first round as a professional at the 1962 Coral Gables Open, he led the tournament at the end of the first day, ultimately finishing 15th.

In 1988 and 1989, Kelley had to compete each week in the Monday qualifying rounds in order to gain entry to that week's Senior PGA tournament, earning one of the few qualifying spots available. He earned the nickname "Mr. Monday" for his ability to gain entry into tournaments via the open qualifier on Mondays. From 1988 to 1992, Kelley garnered 17 top-10 finishes, including a second-place finish at the 1990 Ameritech Senior Open and his sole win at the 1990 Newport Cup.

In addition to a successful career on the Senior PGA Tour and a limited run on the PGA Tour, Kelley served for as a club pro and teaching pro in positions throughout Central Florida. His head golf professional positions included stints at Mid-Florida, Dubsdread, Silver Lake Country Clubs, and Mount Dora County Club near Leesburg, Florida.

== Personal life ==
Kelley died December 17, 2017, at his home in Eustis, Florida.

== Professional wins (1) ==
=== Senior PGA Tour wins (1) ===
No.	Date	Tournament	Winning score	Margin of victory	Runners-up
1	Jul 29, 1990	Newport Cup	−10 (66-68=134)	2 strokes	(United States) John Paul Cain, (United States) Jim Dent
