= John Paul Cain =

American golfer (1936–2017)

Personal information
- Full name: John Paul Cain
- Nationality: United States
- Born: January 14, 1936 Sweetwater, Texas, U.S.
- Died: March 20, 2017 (aged 81) Abilene, Texas, U.S.
- Spouse: Carol Cain
- Children: Julia Cain, Kellie Longwell

Career
- Sport: Golf
- College: Texas Tech University
- Turned professional: 1988
- Former tour: Champions Tour
- Professional wins: 2

Number of wins by tour
- PGA Tour Champions: 2

John Paul Cain (January 14, 1936 – March 20, 2017) was an American professional golfer who played on the Senior PGA Tour.

== Early life and amateur career ==
Cain was born and raised in Sweetwater, Texas. He attended Texas Tech University and was a member of the golf team from 1955–1956 and 1958–1959. He helped the Red Raiders win the last two Border Conference championships in 1955 and 1956. In 1959, Cain helped the team win the Southwest Conference championship and place fifth in the NCAA Championship.

== Professional career ==
Cain worked as a stockbroker in Houston until turning professional in 1988 at the age of 52. He won his first tournament a year later at the Greater Grand Rapids Open, becoming only the second Monday qualifier (after Larry Mowry) to win a Senior PGA Tour event. In 1994, Cain, playing as a sponsor's exemption, earned his second Senior Tour title at the Ameritech Senior Open by one stroke over Jim Colbert and Simon Hobday, both of whom had also finished at T-2 the previous year.

== Awards and honors ==
Cain is a member of the Texas Golf Hall of Fame.

== Amateur wins (1) ==
- 1959 Texas State Amateur

== Professional wins (2) ==
=== Senior PGA Tour wins (2) ===
No.	Date	Tournament	Winning score	Margin of victory	Runners-up
1	Jul 16, 1989	Greater Grand Rapids Open	−10 (69-68-66=203)	1 stroke	(United States) Dave Hill, (United States) Charlie Sifford
2	Jul 17, 1994	Ameritech Senior Open	−14 (66-67-69=202)	1 stroke	(United States) Jim Colbert, (South Africa) Simon Hobday

Senior PGA Tour playoff record (0–1)

No.	Year	Tournament	Opponents	Result
1	1996	Bruno's Memorial Classic	(South Africa) John Bland, (United States) Kermit Zarley	Bland won with bogey on third extra hole Zarley eliminated by par on second hole
