= Denver Open Invitational =

PGA Tour golf tournament

Tournament information
- Location: Denver, Colorado
- Established: 1947
- Course: Denver Country Club
- Par: 70
- Tour: PGA Tour
- Format: Stroke play
- Prize fund: US$35,000
- Month played: August/September
- Final year: 1963

Tournament record score
- Aggregate: 263 Dave Hill (1961)
- To par: −21 as above

Final champion
- (United States) Chi-Chi Rodríguez
- Location in the United States Location in Colorado

The Denver Open Invitational was a golf tournament on the PGA Tour that was played intermittently in the Denver, Colorado area from 1947 to 1963. Chi-Chi Rodríguez won his first PGA Tour event at the 1963 tournament, which he calls his biggest thrill in golf.

== Winners ==
Year	Winner	Score	To par	Margin of victory	Runner(s)-up	Venue	Ref.
Denver Open Invitational
1963	(United States) Chi-Chi Rodríguez	276	−4	2 strokes	(United States) Bill Eggers	Denver	
1962	(United States) Bob Goalby	277	−3	1 stroke	(United States) George Bayer (United States) Bob Duden (United States) Jack Fleck (United States) Bill Johnston (United States) Billy Maxwell (United States) Art Wall Jr.	Denver	
1961	(United States) Dave Hill	263	−21	6 strokes	(United States) Bob Goalby (United States) Art Wall Jr.	Meadow Hills	
Denver Open
1959–1960: No tournament
1958	(United States) Tommy Jacobs	266	−14	1 stroke	(United States) Ernie Vossler	Wellshire	
1949–1957: No tournament
1948	(United States) Ben Hogan	270	−18	1 stroke	(United States) Fred Haas	Wellshire	
1947	(United States) Lew Worsham	276	−8	4 strokes	(United States) Ben Hogan (United States) Johnny Palmer (United States) Tom Wright	Cherry Hills	
