= Bruce Crampton =

Australian professional golfer (born 1935)

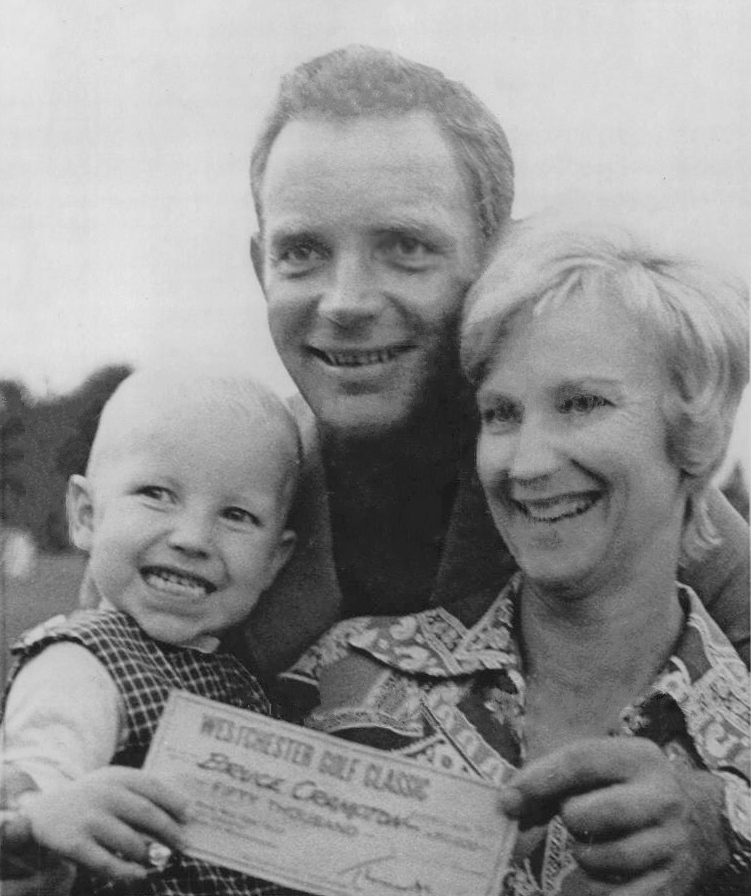
- Crampton with wife Joan and two-years-old son Jay after winning the 1970 Westchester Classic

Personal information
- Nationality: Australia
- Born: 28 September 1935 (age 91) Sydney, New South Wales, Australia
- Height: 5 ft 11 in (180 cm)
- Weight: 180 lb (82 kg)

Career
- Sport: Golf
- Turned professional: 1953
- Former tours: PGA Tour; Champions Tour
- Professional wins: 45

Number of wins by tour
- PGA Tour: 14
- PGA Tour Champions: 20 (Tied-10th all-time)
- Other: 9 (regular); 2 (senior)

Best results in major championships
- Masters Tournament: T2: 1972
- PGA Championship: 2nd: 1973, 1975
- U.S. Open: 2nd: 1972
- The Open Championship: T13: 1956

Achievements and awards
- Vardon Trophy: 1973, 1975
- Senior PGA Tour money list winner: 1986

Bruce Crampton (born 28 September 1935) is an Australian professional golfer.

== Early life and amateur career ==
In 1935, Crampton was born in Sydney, New South Wales. He attended Kogarah High School from 1948 to 1950.

In August 1953, Crampton reached final of the New South Wales Amateur Championship, losing 5&4 to Harry Berwick. As an amateur, he also had success at professional tournaments. In October 1953, at the age of 18, he led the Lakes Open after two rounds. According to Norman Von Nida, he was "probably" the first amateur in roughly 15 years, since Jim Ferrier, "to lead a big tournament after two rounds." In 1953, Von Nida also stated: "Crampton proves my prediction that he would become one of the greatest players Australia has produced."

== Professional career ==
In 1953, Crampton turned professional, becoming an assistant to Billy McWilliam at Beverley Park in Sydney. His decision to turn professional came soon after he had been left out of the Australian amateur team to tour Britain in 1954 and play in the Commonwealth Tournament at St Andrews.

Crampton won the Vardon Trophy for the player with the lowest stroke average on the PGA Tour in 1973 and 1975. He had 14 career wins on the PGA Tour between 1961 and 1975 and was runner up in four major championships – one Masters, one U.S. Open, and two PGA Championships – all to Jack Nicklaus. He was ranked among the top five golfers in the world in both 1972 and 1973, according to Mark McCormack's world golf rankings. His other regular career victories included the Australian Open, New Zealand PGA Championship, Far East Open and the Philippine Open. As a senior, he won 20 times on the Champions Tour, and topped the money list in 1986.

== Awards and honors ==
- Crampton is an Officer of the Order of Australia (AO).
- Crampton is also a Member of the Order of the British Empire (MPE).
- In 1973 and 1975, Crampton earned the Vardon Trophy, given by the PGA of America to the PGA Tour's lowest scorer of the year.
- In 1973, the New South Wales PGA bestowed upon him their Player of the Year award.
- He is also a member of the New South Wales Hall of Champion.
- In 1986, Crampton won the money list for the Senior PGA Tour.
- In 1992, he was inducted into the Texas Golf Hall of Fame.
- In 2001, Crampton was also inducted into the Sport Australia Hall of Fame.

== Professional wins (45) ==
=== PGA Tour wins (14) ===
No.	Date	Tournament	Winning score	Margin of victory	Runner(s)-up
1	23 Jul 1961	Milwaukee Open Invitational	−8 (70-64-67-71=272)	1 stroke	(United States) Gay Brewer, (United States) Bob Goalby
2	15 Jul 1962	Motor City Open	−17 (66-65-70-66=267)	3 strokes	(United States) Dave Hill, (United States) Don Massengale
3	26 Apr 1964	Texas Open Invitational	−7 (71-69-68-65=273)	1 stroke	(New Zealand) Bob Charles, (United States) Chi-Chi Rodríguez
4	24 Jan 1965	Bing Crosby National Pro-Am	−3 (75-67-73-69=284)	3 strokes	(United States) Tony Lema
5	11 May 1965	Colonial National Invitation	−4 (71-68-71-66=276)	3 strokes	(Canada) George Knudson
6	30 May 1965	500 Festival Open Invitation	−5 (71-70-67-71=279)	1 stroke	(United States) Jacky Cupit, (United States) Lionel Hebert
7	9 Nov 1969	Hawaiian Open	−14 (71-71-65-67=274)	4 strokes	(United States) Jack Nicklaus
8	2 Aug 1970	Westchester Classic	−15 (67-71-68-67=273)	1 stroke	(United States) Larry Hinson, (United States) Jack Nicklaus
9	18 Jul 1971	Western Open	−5 (66-73-69-71=279)	2 strokes	(United States) Bobby Nichols
10	14 Jan 1973	Phoenix Open	−12 (68-67-68-65=268)	1 stroke	(United States) Steve Melnyk, (United States) Lanny Wadkins
11	21 Jan 1973	Dean Martin Tucson Open	−11 (70-70-66-71=277)	5 strokes	(United States) George Archer, (United States) Gay Brewer, (United States) Labron Harris Jr.
12	6 May 1973	Houston Open	−11 (72-66-67-72=277)	1 stroke	(United States) Dave Stockton
13	24 Jun 1973	American Golf Classic	−7 (70-67-68-68=273)	3 strokes	(United States) Gay Brewer, (United States) Bob Murphy, (United States) Lanny Wadkins
14	4 May 1975	Houston Open (2)	−15 (68-70-66-69=273)	2 strokes	(United States) Gil Morgan

PGA Tour playoff record (0–2)

No.	Year	Tournament	Opponent	Result
1	1970	Houston Champions International	(United States) Gibby Gilbert	Lost to par on third extra hole
2	1974	B.C. Open	(United States) Richie Karl	Lost to birdie on first extra hole

=== PGA Tour satellite wins (1) ===
- 1968 West End Classic

=== Other wins (8) ===
this list may be incomplete

- 1954 New Zealand PGA Championship
- 1956 Australian Open, Speedo Tournament
- 1957 Pelaco Tournament
- 1958 North Coast Open
- 1959 Far East Open, Philippine Open
- 1971 Wills Masters

=== Senior PGA Tour wins (20) ===
No.	Date	Tournament	Winning score	Margin of victory	Runner(s)-up
1	11 May 1986	Benson & Hedges Invitational	−14 (67-67-68=202)	2 strokes	(New Zealand) Bob Charles
2	27 Jul 1986	MONY Syracuse Senior's Pro Golf Classic	−11 (70-65-71=206)	1 stroke	(Argentina) Roberto De Vicenzo, (United States) Orville Moody, (United States) Chi-Chi Rodríguez
3	17 Jul 1986	GTE Northwest Classic	−6 (77-71-72=210)	2 strokes	(United States) Don January, (United States) George Lanning
4	21 Sep 1986	PaineWebber World Seniors Invitational	−9 (68-69-72=70=279)	1 stroke	(United States) Lee Elder, (United States) Chi-Chi Rodríguez
5	26 Oct 1986	Pepsi Senior Challenge	−8 (65-71=136) (Note: Shortened to 36 holes due to weather.)	1 stroke	(South Africa) Gary Player
6	9 Nov 1986	Las Vegas Senior Classic	−10 (71-67-68=206)	2 strokes	(United States) Dale Douglass
7	23 Nov 1986	Shearson-Lehman Brothers Senior Classic	−16 (65-67-68=200)	4 strokes	(United States) Butch Baird
8	31 May 1987	Denver Champions of Golf	−12 (73-64-67=204)	1 stroke	(United States) Walt Zembriski
9	6 Jul 1987	The Greenbrier American Express Championship	−16 (63-70-67=200)	6 strokes	(United States) Orville Moody
10	19 Jul 1987	MONY Syracuse Senior Classic (2)	−7 (65-67-65=197)	6 strokes	(United States) Chi-Chi Rodríguez
11	6 Sep 1987	Bank One Senior Golf Classic	−13 (63-64-70=197)	6 strokes	(United States) Miller Barber, (New Zealand) Bob Charles, (United States) Joe Jimenez
12	15 May 1988	United Hospitals Classic	−5 (71-65-69=205)	Playoff	(United States) Billy Casper
13	10 Jul 1988	GTE Northwest Classic (2)	−9 (69-68-70=207)	1 stroke	(United States) Don Bies, (Australia) Bruce Devlin
14	12 Mar 1989	MONY Arizona Classic	−16 (67-64-69=200)	1 stroke	(United States) Bobby Nichols
15	23 Jul 1989	Ameritech Senior Open	−11 (70-67-68=205)	1 stroke	(United States) Jim Ferree, (United States) Orville Moody
16	5 Aug 1990	PaineWebber Invitational (2)	−11 (68-69-68=205)	3 strokes	(United States) Tom Shaw
17	14 Oct 1990	Gatlin Brothers Southwest Senior Classic	−12 (67-68-69=204)	4 strokes	(United States) Lee Trevino
18	6 Jan 1991	Infiniti Senior Tournament of Champions	−9 (70-69-69-71=279)	4 strokes	(United States) Frank Beard
19	8 Mar 1992	GTE West Classic	−15 (66-63-66=195)	3 strokes	(United States) Chi-Chi Rodríguez
20	18 May 1997	Cadillac NFL Golf Classic	−6 (76-67-67=210)	Playoff	(South Africa) Hugh Baiocchi

Senior PGA Tour playoff record (2–2)

No.	Year	Tournament	Opponent	Result
1	1988	United Hospitals Classic	(United States) Billy Casper	Won with birdie on first extra hole
2	1990	GTE North Classic	(United States) Mike Hill	Lost to birdie on first extra hole
3	1993	PGA Seniors' Championship	(United States) Tom Wargo	Lost to par on second extra hole
4	1997	Cadillac NFL Golf Classic	(South Africa) Hugh Baiocchi	Won with birdie on third extra hole

=== Other senior wins (2) ===
- 1987 Liberty Mutual Legends of Golf (with Orville Moody)
- 1988 Liberty Mutual Legends of Golf (with Orville Moody)

== Results in major championships ==
Tournament	1956	1957	1958	1959
Masters Tournament		T21	T26	CUT
U.S. Open			T19	CUT
The Open Championship	T13	T39	T34	
PGA Championship				

Tournament	1960	1961	1962	1963	1964	1965	1966	1967	1968	1969
Masters Tournament	T16	CUT	T29	T11	T21	T11	T17	T49		T13
U.S. Open	T38	T22	T45	T5	T14	T32	T57		T46	T6
The Open Championship										
PGA Championship			T17	T3	T56	T20	T43	T26	T23	T15

Tournament	1970	1971	1972	1973	1974	1975	1976
Masters Tournament	T38	T18	T2	T43	T11	CUT	27
U.S. Open	T30	T49	2	CUT	T23		CUT
The Open Championship				T18	CUT		
PGA Championship	T6	T57	T24	2	T48	2	T38

Top 10
Did not play

CUT = missed the half-way cut
"T" indicates a tie for a place

=== Summary ===
Tournament	Wins	2nd	3rd	Top-5	Top-10	Top-25	Events	Cuts made
Masters Tournament	0	1	0	1	1	10	19	16
U.S. Open	0	1	0	2	3	7	17	14
The Open Championship	0	0	0	0	0	2	5	4
PGA Championship	0	2	1	3	4	9	15	15
Totals	0	4	1	6	8	28	56	49

- Most consecutive cuts made – 33 (1961 U.S. Open – 1973 Masters)
- Longest streak of top-10s – 2 (twice)

== Team appearances ==
Amateur

- Australian Men's Interstate Teams Matches (representing New South Wales): 1953

Professional

- World Cup (representing Australia): 1957, 1963, 1964, 1967, 1972
- Slazenger Trophy (representing British Commonwealth and Empire): 1956
- Vicars Shield (representing New South Wales): 1956 (winners)

== See also ==
- List of golfers with most Champions Tour wins
