= Speedo Tournament =

1955–1956 Australian golf tournament

Tournament information
- Location: Australia
- Established: 1955
- Final year: 1956

Final champion
- Bruce Crampton

The Speedo Tournament was a golf tournament held in Australia in 1955 and 1956. Total prize money was A£2,000. The sponsor was Speedo, an Australian swimwear manufacturer.

== Winners ==
Year	Winner	Country	Venue	Score	Margin of victory	Runner-up	Winner's share (A£)	Ref
1955	Peter Thomson	Australia	Bonnie Doon Golf Club	288	2 strokes	(Australia) Frank Phillips	750	
1956	Bruce Crampton	Australia	Victoria Golf Club	278	4 strokes	(Australia) Peter Thomson	400	
