= Kentucky Open =

Kentucky state open golf tournament

The Kentucky Open is the Kentucky state open golf tournament, open to both amateur and professional golfers. It is organized by the Kentucky Golf Association. It has been played annually since 1920 at a variety of courses around the state.

== Winners ==
- 2026 Erik Edwards
- 2025 Cooper Musselman
- 2024 Ashton Van Horne
- 2023 Justin Tereshko (a)
- 2022 Patrick Newcomb
- 2021 J. B. Williams
- 2020 J. B. Williams
- 2019 J. B. Williams
- 2018 Trey Shirley
- 2017 Cooper Musselman (a)
- 2016 Ashton Van Horne
- 2015 Kent Bulle
- 2014 Rick Cochran III
- 2013 Rick Cochran III
- 2012 Keith Ohr
- 2011 Brandon Brown
- 2010 Andy Roberts (a)
- 2009 Matt Savage
- 2008 Trey Bowling (a)
- 2007 Phil Hendrickson (a)
- 2006 Matt Savage (a)
- 2005 Cale Barr (a)
- 2004 J. B. Holmes (a)
- 2003 J. B. Holmes (a)
- 2002 Grant Sturgeon
- 2001 Keith Ohr
- 2000 Buddy Harston
- 1999 Rob Bradley
- 1998 Stan Bickel
- 1997 Steve Smitha
- 1996 Chris Wilson (a)
- 1995 Chris Osborne
- 1994 Stan Bickel
- 1993 Steve Flesch
- 1992 Dave Peege
- 1991 Steve Flesch
- 1990 Dave Peege
- 1989 Rob McNamara (a)
- 1988 Ted Schulz
- 1987 Ralph Landrum
- 1986 Rob McNamara (a)
- 1985 Dave Peege (a)
- 1984 Ted Schulz
- 1983 Dave Peege (a)
- 1982 Steve Rogers (a)
- 1981 Phil Krick
- 1980 Jodie Mudd (a)
- 1979 Jodie Mudd (a)
- 1978 Jack Barber
- 1977 Jack Freeman
- 1976 Larry Gilbert
- 1975 Larry Gilbert
- 1974 Al Atkins
- 1973 Stacy Russell
- 1972 Brown Cullen
- 1971 Moe Demling
- 1970 Jimmy Ferriell
- 1969 Jimmy Ferriell
- 1968 Larry Gilbert
- 1967 Ron Acree
- 1966 Jimmy Ferriell
- 1965 Ted Hale
- 1964 Frank Beard
- 1963 Gordon Leishman
- 1962 Chick Yarbrough
- 1961 Chick Yarbrough
- 1960 Al Atkins
- 1959 Jack Ryan
- 1958 Jack Ryan
- 1957 Al Atkins
- 1956 Pete Doll
- 1955 Herman Coelho
- 1954 Courtney Noe
- 1953 Jack Ryan
- 1952 Jack Ryan
- 1951 Gay Brewer (a)
- 1950 Jack Ryan
- 1949 Jack Ryan
- 1948 Bus Schulz
- 1947 Jack Ryan
- 1946 Alvey Hume
- 1945 George Helm (a)
- 1944 Buck White
- 1943 Byron Nelson
- 1942 Jack Ryan
- 1941 Bud Beirne
- 1940 Jack Ryan
- 1939 Bill Kaiser
- 1938 Bill Kaiser
- 1937 Ray Ottman
- 1936 Jack Ryan
- 1935 Billy Wolfe (a)
- 1934 Bill Kaiser
- 1933 Jack Mohney (a)
- 1932 Ray Ottman
- 1931 Bernard Berning
- 1930 George Starks
- 1929 Ray Ottman
- 1928 Larry Wiechman
- 1927 Ben Wiechman
- 1926 Darwin Stapp (a)
- 1925 Craig Wood
- 1924 Leonard Loos
- 1923 Bob Peebles
- 1922 John Brophy
- 1921 Ernest Morris
- 1920 Bobby Craigs

(a) denotes amateur
