= Gatlin Brothers Southwest Senior Classic =

Texas golf tournament

The Gatlin Brothers Southwest Senior Classic was a golf tournament on the Senior PGA Tour (now PGA Tour Champions) from 1989 to 1990. It was played in Abilene, Texas at the Fairway Oaks Country Club. It replaced the Southwest Golf Classic on the PGA Tour, which had been played from 1981 to 1988 at the same course.

In the inaugural event, George Archer won in a playoff over Orville Moody and Jimmy Powell. Archer had turned 50 just two weeks before and this was his debut Senior PGA Tour event. In the tournament's second and final year, Bruce Crampton won by four strokes over Lee Trevino.

== Winners ==
Year	Date	Winner	Country	Score	To par	Margin of victory	Runner(s)-up	Purse ($)	Winner's share ($)	Ref
1989	Oct 15	George Archer	United States	209	−7	Playoff	(United States) Orville Moody (United States) Jimmy Powell	300,000	45,000	
1990	Oct 14	Bruce Crampton	Australia	204	−12	4 strokes	(United States) Lee Trevino	300,000	45,000	
