= Chi Chi's Pro Challenge Golf =

1993 video game

Chi Chi's Pro Challenge Golf Top Pro Golf 2
- North American cover art
- Developer: Soft Vision
- Publishers: JP: Soft Vision; NA: Virgin Games
- Platform: Sega Genesis
- Release: JP: June 25, 1993; NA: July 1993
- Genre: Traditional golf simulation
- Modes: Single-player; Multiplayer

Chi Chi's Pro Challenge Golf (トッププロゴルフ; Top Pro Golf 2) is a 1993 golf video game that was released for the Sega Genesis featuring Chi-Chi Rodríguez.

== Gameplay ==
The player is making a putt to the hole.

There are options for either stroke play, match play, or an elaborate golf tournament with 23 players trying to win the prestigious "Virgin Cup" Each opponent's skills are measured on putting, approaching the green, and controlling the golf ball using the provided golf clubs. Players can either play on a fictitious U.S. golf course or a fictitious Japanese golf course complete with realistic clouds and hazards. Once they get started, players must find out where to hit the ball from and make the right decision to aim the ball (taking wind speed into consideration). A swing meter then allows the player to deliver the precise strength to get the ball as close to the hole as possible.

Games are saved by passwords.
