= Ko Olina Senior Invitational =

The Ko Olina Senior Invitational was a golf tournament on the Champions Tour played only in 1992. It was played in Ewa Beach, Hawaii at the Ko Olina Golf Club. The purse for the tournament was US$500,000, with $75,000 going to the winner, Chi-Chi Rodríguez.
