= Shearson-Lehman Brothers Senior Classic =

The Shearson-Lehman Brothers Senior Classic was a golf tournament on the Champions Tour played only in 1986. It was played in Delray Beach, Florida at the Gleneagles Country Club. The purse for the tournament was US$200,000, with $30,000 going to the winner, Bruce Crampton.

The tournament was sponsored by Shearson Lehman/American Express.
