= Dave Hill (golfer) =

American professional golfer (1937–2011)

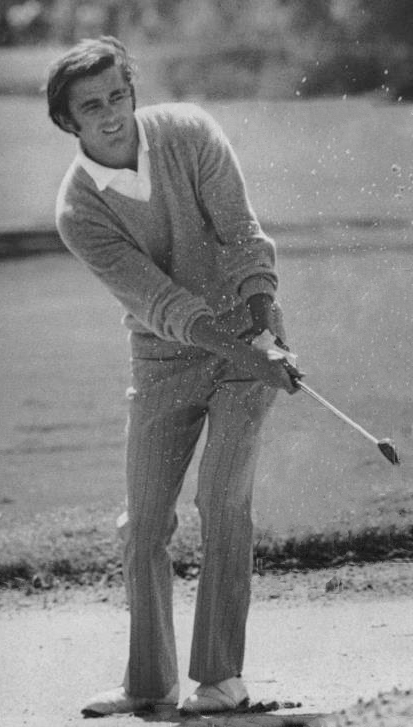
- Hill in 1973

Personal information
- Full name: James David Hill
- Nationality: United States
- Born: May 20, 1937 Jackson, Michigan, U.S.
- Died: September 27, 2011 (aged 74) Jackson, Michigan, U.S.
- Height: 5 ft 11 in (1.80 m)
- Weight: 145 lb (66 kg; 10.4 st)

Career
- Sport: Golf
- College: University of Detroit
- Turned professional: 1958
- Former tours: PGA Tour; Champions Tour
- Professional wins: 25

Number of wins by tour
- PGA Tour: 13
- PGA Tour Champions: 6
- Other: 6

Best results in major championships
- Masters Tournament: T5: 1970
- PGA Championship: T3: 1974
- U.S. Open: 2nd: 1970
- The Open Championship: T18: 1973

Achievements and awards
- Vardon Trophy: 1969

James David Hill (May 20, 1937 – September 27, 2011) was an American professional golfer. He was the brother of Mike Hill who was also a professional golfer.

== Career ==
In 1937, Hill was born in Jackson, Michigan. He attended the University of Detroit, where he played on the golf team. Hill won 13 times on the PGA Tour, three of which came during his career year of 1969, when he also won the Vardon Trophy for lowest scoring average. He was a member of the United States Ryder Cup team in 1969, 1973, and 1977.

Hill was known for his quick wit and biting sarcasm, and was sometimes referred to as "the Don Rickles of the golf tour". He frequently led the tour in fines and was once suspended for two months after he deliberately broke his putter on national television. At the 1966 Thunderbird Classic, Hill signed his second round scorecard that included a score of 108 on the 18th hole. Hill played in the acrimonious 1969 Ryder Cup that ended in a 16–16 tie when Jack Nicklaus made his famous "concession" of a short but missable putt to Tony Jacklin on the 18th green in the final match.

In 1970, Hill had his best finish in a major championship. He finished in solo second place at the 1970 U.S. Open played at Hazeltine National Golf Club in Minnesota.

In 1987, Hill joined the Senior PGA Tour (now the Champions Tour). He won six tournaments on that tour. Hill had a cameo appearance in the movie, Now You See Him, Now You Don't.

== Controversies ==
Hill finished runner-up at the 1970 U.S. Open. What gained him the most notoriety, though, was not his excellent play but his criticisms of the golf course. In the middle of the championship, before the third round, Hill was fined $150 by Joe Dey Jr., commissioner of the Tournament Players Division of the PGA of America, for "criticism that tends to ridicule and demean the club".

When first asked what he thought of the golf course, he said "I'm still looking for it". When asked what Hazeltine needed, he retorted, "Hazeltine really did lack only 80 acres of corn and a few cows. They ruined a good farm when they built this course". Hill was far from alone among the pros in his criticism of Hazeltine, which had to be extensively redesigned before getting a chance to host another men's major, again the U.S. Open, in 1991. Afterward, Hill claimed to have paid a farmer cash to borrow his tractor. If he had won the 1970 U.S. Open, Hill planned to ride the tractor out onto the golf course as he hoisted the trophy.

Another controversy involving Hill started in 1971. At the 1971 Colonial National Invitation, Hill shot rounds of 77-85 to miss the cut. On his last hole, Hill threw a ball out of a sand trap. Hill was disqualified but it was for his signing a scorecard with an incorrect score on it. When Hill went to play in his next tournament, the Danny Thomas Memphis Classic, Hill was told he was being fined $500 for conduct unbecoming a professional golfer. Hill was required to pay the fine before teeing it up in the tournament. He did so but less than a week later, Hill filed a one-million dollar anti-trust suit against the PGA Tour. In response, the tour put Hill on probation for one year. Hill then increased the amount of damages he was seeking to three-million dollars. The litigation was resolved out of court in less than a year and Hill was taken off probation.

Late in 1971 Hill played some events in Australia. He had a "series of verbal clashes" with Australian golfer Peter Thomson at the Wills Masters. The following week Hill and Thomson played the Australian Open and were paired together in the first round. The "cold war" between the two players continued as neither offered to shake the other man's hand at the beginning of the round. Through the round both did not communicate much to each other but did occasionally congratulate the other golfer when he hit a good shot. In 1974, he had made a comment about playing in the Houston Open to "get even" with the Houston Golf Association, as he apparently was refused permission by executive director John Davis to withdraw from the tournament a year earlier, which saw him rush to travel to Houston to play one round before withdrawing. He made a dramatic comeback to shoot seven-under-par 65 on the final round (for a total of −12) to win by a stroke before expressing his dislike about talking to the press.

At the 1991 Transamerica Senior Golf Championship, Hill got into a fight on the driving range with J. C. Snead. Snead was hitting shots across the range, the balls rolling near a spot where Hill was practicing. Hill yelled at Snead, then grabbed a club and came after his much bigger adversary. After punching and wrestling their way to the ground, they were separated by other players and caddies.

== Personal life ==
Hill died on September 27, 2011, in Jackson, Michigan, after spending the last few years of his life battling emphysema.

== Professional wins (24) ==
=== PGA Tour wins (13) ===
No.	Date	Tournament	Winning score	Margin of victory	Runner(s)-up
1	Feb 19, 1961	Home of the Sun Open	−11 (69-66-69-65=269)	Playoff	(United States) Tommy Bolt, (United States) Bud Sullivan
2	Sep 10, 1961	Denver Open Invitational	−21 (63-64-67-69=263)	6 strokes	(United States) Bob Goalby, (United States) Art Wall Jr.
3	Jul 14, 1963	Hot Springs Open Invitational	−11 (69-70-70-68=277)	Playoff	(United States) Mike Souchak
4	Jun 4, 1967	Memphis Open Invitational	−8 (65-66-68-73=272)	2 strokes	(United States) Johnny Pott
5	Jun 1, 1969	Memphis Open Invitational (2)	−15 (67-67-66-65=265)	2 strokes	(United States) Lee Elder
6	Jul 6, 1969	Buick Open Invitational	−11 (68-68-71-70=277)	2 strokes	(United States) Frank Beard
7	Jul 20, 1969	IVB-Philadelphia Golf Classic	−9 (71-71-68-69=279)	Playoff	(United States) Gay Brewer, (United States) Tommy Jacobs, (United States) R. H. Sikes
8	May 31, 1970	Danny Thomas Memphis Classic (3)	−13 (63-69-67-68=267)	3 strokes	(United States) Frank Beard, (United States) Homero Blancas, (New Zealand) Bob Charles
9	Apr 16, 1972	Monsanto Open	−13 (64-68-68-71=271)	1 stroke	(United States) Jerry Heard
10	May 20, 1973	Danny Thomas Memphis Classic (4)	−5 (68-69-74-72=283)	1 stroke	(United States) Allen Miller, (United States) Lee Trevino
11	May 12, 1974	Houston Open	−12 (70-67-74-65=276)	1 stroke	(United States) Rod Curl, (United States) Steve Melnyk, (United States) Andy North
12	Sep 28, 1975	Sahara Invitational	−14 (68-66-67-69=270)	Playoff	(United States) Rik Massengale
13	Jul 4, 1976	Greater Milwaukee Open	−18 (66-67-68-69=270)	3 strokes	(United States) John Jacobs

PGA Tour playoff record (4–2)

No.	Year	Tournament	Opponent(s)	Result
1	1961	Home of the Sun Open	(United States) Tommy Bolt, (United States) Bud Sullivan	Won with birdie on third extra hole
2	1963	Hot Springs Open Invitational	(United States) Mike Souchak	Won with par on second extra hole
3	1969	IVB-Philadelphia Golf Classic	(United States) Gay Brewer, (United States) Tommy Jacobs, (United States) R. H. Sikes	Won with birdie on first extra hole
4	1969	Greater Hartford Open	(United States) Bob Lunn	Lost to birdie on fourth extra hole
5	1972	Glen Campbell-Los Angeles Open	(United States) Tommy Aaron, (United States) George Archer	Archer won 18-hole playoff; Archer: −5 (66), Aaron: −3 (68), Hill: −3 (68)
6	1975	Sahara Invitational	(United States) Rik Massengale	Won with par on first extra hole

=== Other wins (5) ===
this list may be incomplete

- 1959 Michigan Open
- 1971 Colorado Open
- 1976 Colorado Open
- 1977 Colorado Open
- 1981 Colorado Open

=== Senior PGA Tour wins (6) ===
No.	Date	Tournament	Winning score	Margin of victory	Runner(s)-up
1	Nov 22, 1987	Fairfield Barnett Senior Classic	−14 (68-66-68=202)	5 strokes	(United States) Lee Elder, (United States) Al Geiberger
2	Jan 17, 1988	MONY Senior Tournament of Champions	−5 (68-72-71=211) (Note: Shortened to 54 holes due to weather.)	1 stroke	(United States) Miller Barber, (United States) Al Geiberger
3	Aug 14, 1988	MONY Syracuse Senior Classic	−16 (68-64-68=206)	5 strokes	(United States) Butch Baird, (United States) Bobby Nichols
4	Sep 25, 1988	PaineWebber Invitational	−10 (68-68-70=206)	1 stroke	(Australia) Bruce Crampton
5	May 14, 1989	Bell Atlantic/St. Christopher's Classic	−4 (72-68-66=206)	Playoff	(United States) Chi-Chi Rodríguez
6	Aug 13, 1989	Rancho Murieta Senior Gold Rush	−11 (69-70-68=207)	1 stroke	(United States) Orville Moody

Senior PGA Tour playoff record (1–1)

No.	Year	Tournament	Opponent(s)	Result
1	1989	GTE Suncoast Classic	(New Zealand) Bob Charles, (United States) Jim Ferree, (South Africa) Harold Henning	Charles won with birdie on third extra hole Hill and Ferree eliminated by birdie on first hole
2	1989	Bell Atlantic/St. Christopher's Classic	(United States) Chi-Chi Rodríguez	Won with par on third extra hole

=== Other senior wins (1) ===
- 1988 Mazda Champions (with Colleen Walker)

== Results in major championships ==
Tournament	1961	1962	1963	1964	1965	1966	1967	1968	1969
Masters Tournament								T50	T24
U.S. Open	T51	WD		CUT		T22	T18	T16	T13
The Open Championship									
PGA Championship		CUT	T17	CUT			T11	T17	T15

Tournament	1970	1971	1972	1973	1974	1975	1976	1977	1978	1979
Masters Tournament	T5	T27	CUT	T37	T11	7	T15	T39	T45	CUT
U.S. Open	2	CUT	T29		CUT				CUT	
The Open Championship				T18						
PGA Championship	T68	T6	WD	CUT	T3	T7	T22	T48	T50	

Top 10
Did not play

CUT = missed the half-way cut (3rd round cut in 1964 PGA Championship)
WD = withdrew
"T" indicates a tie for a place

=== Summary ===
Tournament	Wins	2nd	3rd	Top-5	Top-10	Top-25	Events	Cuts made
Masters Tournament	0	0	0	1	2	5	12	10
U.S. Open	0	1	0	1	1	5	12	7
The Open Championship	0	0	0	0	0	1	1	1
PGA Championship	0	0	1	1	3	8	15	11
Totals	0	1	1	3	6	19	40	29

- Most consecutive cuts made – 1 (1966 U.S. Open – 1971 Masters)
- Longest streak of top-10s – 3 (1974 PGA – 1975 PGA)

== U.S. national team appearances ==
Professional

- Ryder Cup: 1969 (tied, cup retained), 1973 (winners), 1977 (winners)
