= Orville Moody =

American professional golfer (1933–2008)

Personal information
- Full name: Orville James Moody
- Nickname: Sarge
- Nationality: United States
- Born: December 9, 1933 Chickasha, Oklahoma, U.S.
- Died: August 8, 2008 (aged 74) Allen, Texas, U.S.
- Height: 5 ft 10 in (1.78 m)
- Weight: 200 lb (91 kg; 14 st)
- Spouse: Beverly Moody
- Children: 4

Career
- Sport: Golf
- College: Oklahoma (briefly)
- Turned professional: 1967
- Former tours: PGA Tour; Champions Tour
- Professional wins: 31

Number of wins by tour
- PGA Tour: 1
- PGA Tour Champions: 11
- Other: 19

Best results in major championships (wins: 1)
- Masters Tournament: T18: 1970
- PGA Championship: T7: 1969
- U.S. Open: Won: 1969
- The Open Championship: T11: 1978

Achievements and awards
- PGA Player of the Year: 1969

Orville Moody
- Military career
- Allegiance: United States
- Branch: United States Army
- Service years: 1952–1966

Orville James Moody (December 9, 1933 – August 8, 2008) was an American professional golfer who won numerous tournaments in his career. He won the U.S. Open in 1969, the last champion in the 20th century to win through local and sectional qualifying.

== Early life ==
In 1933, Moody was born in Chickasha, Oklahoma. He was the youngest of ten children. The son of a golf course superintendent, he began his career at Capitol Hill High School in Oklahoma City, winning the 1952 state high school golf championship.

After attempting college for a few weeks at the University of Oklahoma he joined the U.S. Army. He was able to continue playing golf while in uniform, winning the All-Service championship and the Korea Open three times. He spent fourteen years in the Army heading up maintenance supervision and instruction at all Army golf courses.

== Professional career ==
In 1967, Moody gave up his military career in favor of a trial run at the PGA Tour. His nickname on tour was "Sarge" because he rose to the rank of sergeant in the Army. Moody had limited success on the PGA Tour prior to 1969. In April of that year, he took part in a four-way playoff at the Greater Greensboro Open won by Gene Littler.

The 1969 U.S. Open was played in June at the Cypress Creek Course of the Champions Golf Club in Houston, Texas. Defending champion Lee Trevino picked Moody to win, saying, "He's one helluva player." Moody won by one stroke over Deane Beman, Al Geiberger, and Bob Rosburg with a 72-hole score of 281. He tied for sixteenth at the British Open, tied for seventh at the PGA Championship, and was named PGA Player of the Year for 1969.

The U.S. Open win was Moody's sole tour victory in 266 career events, although he was runner-up five times. He toured Japan, played in a few tournaments and eventually took a club pro job in Sulphur Springs, Texas. Moody was troubled by poor putting during his early pro years.

His career on the Senior PGA Tour was dramatically different. After turning fifty in late 1983, he won two of his first five tournaments in 1984 and finished fifth on the money list. In 1989, he became only the fourth man to win both the U.S. Open and the U.S. Senior Open. Moody went to a long putter after becoming a senior golfer, and this method improved his putting significantly. He had eleven wins on the senior tour, with the last in 1992.

Moody had triple bypass heart surgery prior to the 1995 season but still managed to play in 29 events.

Moody continued to play in charity and other golf events up until 2007.

== Personal life ==
In 2008, he died at the age of 74 in Allen, Texas, from complications of a stroke he had earlier suffered and/or complications from multiple myeloma. He was survived by his wife, Beverly, their son and three daughters, and eight grandchildren.

== Awards and honors ==
In 1969, Moody earned PGA Player of the Year honors

== Professional wins (31) ==
=== PGA Tour wins (1) ===
Legend
Major championships (1)
Other PGA Tour (0)

No.	Date	Tournament	Winning score	To par	Margin of victory	Runners-up
1	Jun 15, 1969	U.S. Open	71-70-68-72=281	+1	1 stroke	(United States) Deane Beman, (United States) Al Geiberger, (United States) Bob Rosburg

PGA Tour playoff record (0–2)

No.	Year	Tournament	Opponents	Result
1	1969	Greater Greensboro Open	(United States) Julius Boros, (United States) Gene Littler, (United States) Tom Weiskopf	Littler won with birdie on fifth extra hole Weiskopf eliminated by par on first hole
2	1973	Bing Crosby National Pro-Am	(United States) Raymond Floyd, (United States) Jack Nicklaus	Nicklaus won with birdie on first extra hole

=== Asia Golf Circuit wins (1) ===
No.	Date	Tournament	Winning score	To par	Margin of victory	Runner-up
1	Apr 4, 1971	Hong Kong Open	66-66-66-68=266	−14	2 strokes	(Japan) Haruo Yasuda

=== Korean wins (5) ===
- 1958 Korea Open
- 1959 KPGA Championship, Korea Open
- 1960 Korea Open
- 1966 KPGA Championship

=== Other wins (3) ===
This list is incomplete

- 1969 World Series of Golf, World Cup (team with Lee Trevino)
- 1971 Hassan II Golf Trophy

=== Senior PGA Tour wins (11) ===
Legend
Senior PGA Tour major championships (2)
Other Senior PGA Tour (9)

No.	Date	Tournament	Winning score	To par	Margin of victory	Runner(s)-up
1	Apr 8, 1984	Daytona Beach Seniors Golf Classic	70-74-69=213	−3	Playoff	(United States) Arnold Palmer, (United States) Dan Sikes
2	May 6, 1984	MONY Senior Tournament of Champions	71-75-70-72=288	E	7 strokes	(United States) Dan Sikes
3	Aug 16, 1987	Rancho Murieta Senior Gold Rush	69-67-69=205	−11	2 strokes	(United States) Butch Baird
4	Dec 13, 1987	GTE Kaanapali Classic	65-67=132*	−12	3 strokes	(United States) John Brodie
5	Mar 6, 1988	Vintage Chrysler Invitational	66-64-70-63=263	−25	11 strokes	(United States) Al Geiberger, (South Africa) Harold Henning
6	Jun 5 1988	Senior Players Reunion Pro-Am	70-70-66=206	−10	Playoff	(New Zealand) Bob Charles, (United States) Don Massengale, (United States) Bobby Nichols
7	Aug 21, 1988	Greater Grand Rapids Open	68-65-70=203	−7	1 stroke	(United States) Chick Evans, (South Africa) Gary Player, (United States) Chi-Chi Rodríguez
8	Jun 11, 1989	Mazda Senior Tournament Players Championship	67-69-64-71=271	−17	2 strokes	(United States) Charles Coody
9	Jul 2, 1989	U.S. Senior Open	72-73-64-70=279	−9	2 strokes	(United States) Frank Beard
10	Jun 23, 1991	PaineWebber Invitational	69-68-70=207	−9	1 stroke	(United States) Dick Hendrickson
11	Aug 30, 1992	Franklin Showdown Classic	70-67=137*	−7	Playoff	(United States) Bob Betley

*Note: Tournament shortened to 36 holes due to weather.

Senior PGA Tour playoff record (3–4)

No.	Year	Tournament	Opponent(s)	Result
1	1984	Daytona Beach Seniors Golf Classic	(United States) Arnold Palmer, (United States) Dan Sikes	Won with birdie on second extra hole
2	1985	Citizens Union Senior Golf Classic	(United States) Lee Elder, (United States) Dan Sikes, (United States) Walt Zembriski	Elder won with birdie on third extra hole Moody eliminated by birdie on second hole
3	1988	Senior Players Reunion Pro-Am	(New Zealand) Bob Charles, (United States) Don Massengale, (United States) Bobby Nichols	Won with birdie on first extra hole
4	1989	Southwestern Bell Classic	(United States) Bobby Nichols	Lost to birdie on third extra hole
5	1989	Northville Long Island Classic	(United States) Butch Baird, (United States) Frank Beard, (United States) Don Bies	Baird won with birdie on first extra hole
6	1989	Gatlin Brothers Southwest Senior Classic	(United States) George Archer, (United States) Jimmy Powell	Archer won with par on second extra hole
7	1992	Franklin Showdown Classic	(United States) Bob Betley	Won with birdie on eighth extra hole

=== Other senior wins (10) ===
- 1984 Viceroy Panama Open
- 1986 Australian PGA Seniors Championship
- 1987 Liberty Mutual Legends of Golf (with Bruce Crampton)
- 1987 Australian PGA Seniors Championship
- 1988 Liberty Mutual Legends of Golf (with Bruce Crampton)
- 1995 Liberty Mutual Legends of Golf - Legendary Division (with Jimmy Powell)
- 1996 Liberty Mutual Legends of Golf - Legendary Division (with Jimmy Powell)
- 1999 Liberty Mutual Legends of Golf - Legendary Division (with Jimmy Powell)
- 2005 Liberty Mutual Legends of Golf - Demaret Division (with Jimmy Powell)
- 2006 Liberty Mutual Legends of Golf - Demaret Division (with Jimmy Powell)

== Major championships ==
=== Wins (1) ===
Year	Championship	54 holes	Winning score	Margin	Runners-up
1969	U.S. Open	3 shot deficit	+1 (71-70-68-72=281)	1 stroke	(United States) Deane Beman, (United States) Al Geiberger, (United States) Bob Rosburg

=== Results timeline ===
Tournament	1962	1963	1964	1965	1966	1967	1968	1969
Masters Tournament								
U.S. Open	CUT							1
The Open Championship								T16
PGA Championship								T7

Tournament	1970	1971	1972	1973	1974	1975	1976	1977	1978	1979	1980
Masters Tournament	T18	T20	CUT	CUT	44						
U.S. Open	CUT	T27	T15	CUT		CUT					
The Open Championship	CUT								T11	T19	CUT
PGA Championship	T41	CUT	WD	T30						CUT	

Win
Top 10
Did not play

CUT = missed the half-way cut (3rd round cut in 1970 and 1980 Open Championships)
WD = withdrew
"T" = tied

=== Summary ===
Tournament	Wins	2nd	3rd	Top-5	Top-10	Top-25	Events	Cuts made
Masters Tournament	0	0	0	0	0	2	5	3
U.S. Open	1	0	0	1	1	2	7	3
The Open Championship	0	0	0	0	0	3	5	3
PGA Championship	0	0	0	0	1	1	6	3
Totals	1	0	0	1	2	8	23	12

- Most consecutive cuts made – 4 (1969 U.S. Open – 1970 Masters)
- Longest streak of top-10s – 1 (twice)

== Champions Tour major championships ==
=== Wins (2) ===
Year	Championship	Winning score	Margin	Runner-up
1989	Mazda Senior Tournament Players Championship	−17 (67−69−64−71=271)	2 strokes	(United States) Charles Coody
1989	U.S. Senior Open	−9 (72−73−64−70=279)	2 strokes	(United States) Frank Beard

== U.S. national team appearances ==
Professional

- World Cup: 1969 (winners)

== See also ==
- 1967 PGA Tour Qualifying School graduates
- List of golfers with most Champions Tour wins
