= MONY Syracuse Senior Classic =

The MONY Syracuse Senior Classic was a golf tournament on the Champions Tour from 1982 to 1991. It was played in Syracuse, New York at the Bellevue Country Club (1982–1984) and in Jamesville, New York at the Lafayette Country Club (1985–1991).

The purse for the 1991 tournament was US$400,000, with $60,000 going to the winner. The tournament was founded in 1982 as the Greater Syracuse Senior's Pro Golf Classic.

== Winners ==
MONY Syracuse Senior Classic

- 1991 Rocky Thompson
- 1990 Jim Dent
- 1989 Jim Dent
- 1988 Dave Hill
- 1987 Bruce Crampton

MONY Syracuse Senior's Pro Golf Classic

- 1986 Bruce Crampton

MONY Syracuse Senior's Classic

- 1985 Peter Thomson

Greater Syracuse Senior's Pro Classic

- 1984 Miller Barber
- 1983 Gene Littler

Greater Syracuse Senior's Pro Golf Classic

- 1982 Bill Collins
