= Crestar Classic =

The Crestar Classic was a golf tournament on the Champions Tour from 1983 to 1990. It was played in Manakin-Sabot, Virginia at the Hermitage Country Club. In 1988, it was the last professional victory for Arnold Palmer.

The purse for the 1990 tournament was US$350,000, with $52,500 going to the winner. The tournament was founded in 1983 as the United Virginia Bank Seniors.

== Winners ==
Crestar Classic

- 1990 Jim Dent
- 1989 Chi-Chi Rodríguez
- 1988 Arnold Palmer
- 1987 Larry Mowry

United Virginia Bank Seniors

- 1986 Chi-Chi Rodríguez
- 1985 Peter Thomson
- 1984 Dan Sikes
- 1983 Miller Barber
