= Dallas Reunion Pro-Am =

The Dallas Reunion Pro-Am was a golf tournament on the Champions Tour from 1985 to 1995. It was played at a number of locations in the greater Dallas, Texas area: Bent Tree Country Club (1985–1988), Stonebriar Country Club (1989–1993) in Frisco, Texas, and Oak Cliff Country Club (1994–1995).

The purse for the 1995 tournament was US$550,000, with $82,500 going to the winner. The tournament was founded in 1985 as the Senior Players Reunion Pro-Am.

== Winners ==
Dallas Reunion Pro-Am

- 1995 Tom Wargo
- 1994 Larry Gilbert

Muratec Reunion Pro-Am

- 1993 Dave Stockton

Murata Reunion Pro-Am

- 1992 George Archer
- 1991 Chi-Chi Rodríguez
- 1990 Frank Beard

Murata Seniors Reunion

- 1989 Don Bies

Senior Players Reunion Pro-Am

- 1988 Orville Moody
- 1987 Chi-Chi Rodríguez
- 1986 Don January
- 1985 Peter Thomson
