= Gold Rush Classic =

Golf tournament

The Gold Rush Classic was a golf tournament on the Champions Tour from 1987 to 2001. It was played in Rancho Murieta, California at the Rancho Murieta Country Club (1987–1995) and in El Dorado Hills, California at Serrano Country Club (1996–2001).

The purse for the 2001 tournament was US$1,300,000, with $195,000 going to the winner. The tournament was founded in 1987 as the Rancho Murieta Senior Gold Rush.

== Winners ==
Gold Rush Classic

- 2001 Tom Kite
- 2000 Jim Thorpe

Raley's Gold Rush Classic

- 1999 David Graham
- 1998 Dana Quigley
- 1997 Bob Eastwood
- 1996 Jim Colbert

Raley's Senior Gold Rush

- 1995 Don Bies
- 1994 Bob Murphy
- 1993 George Archer
- 1992 Bob Charles
- 1991 George Archer

Rancho Murieta Senior Gold Rush

- 1990 George Archer
- 1989 Dave Hill
- 1988 Bob Charles
- 1987 Orville Moody
