= Sunwest Bank Charley Pride Senior Golf Classic =

The Sunwest Bank Charley Pride Senior Golf Classic was a golf tournament on the Senior PGA Tour, later known as the Champions Tour, from 1986 to 1991. It was played in Albuquerque, New Mexico at the Four Hills Country Club. The purse for the 1991 tournament was US$350,000, with $52,500 going to the winner.

Originally founded as the Charley Pride Golf Fiesta, the tournament was an amateur celebrity event until 1983 when it became a fixture on the short lived PGA Tour satellite tour, the Tournament Players Series, with a purse of US$200,000. When that circuit ended after the 1985 season, the Charley Pride changed to become an event on the over-50s seniors tour with a new title sponsor and an increased purse of US$250,000.

== Winners ==
Senior PGA Tour

- 1991 Lee Trevino
- 1990 Chi-Chi Rodríguez
- 1989 Bob Charles
- 1988 Bob Charles
- 1987 Bob Charles
- 1986 Gene Littler

Tournament Players Series

- 1985 Jim Gallagher Jr.
- 1984 Darrell Kestner
- 1983 Jay Cudd
