= George Archer =

American professional golfer (1939–2005)

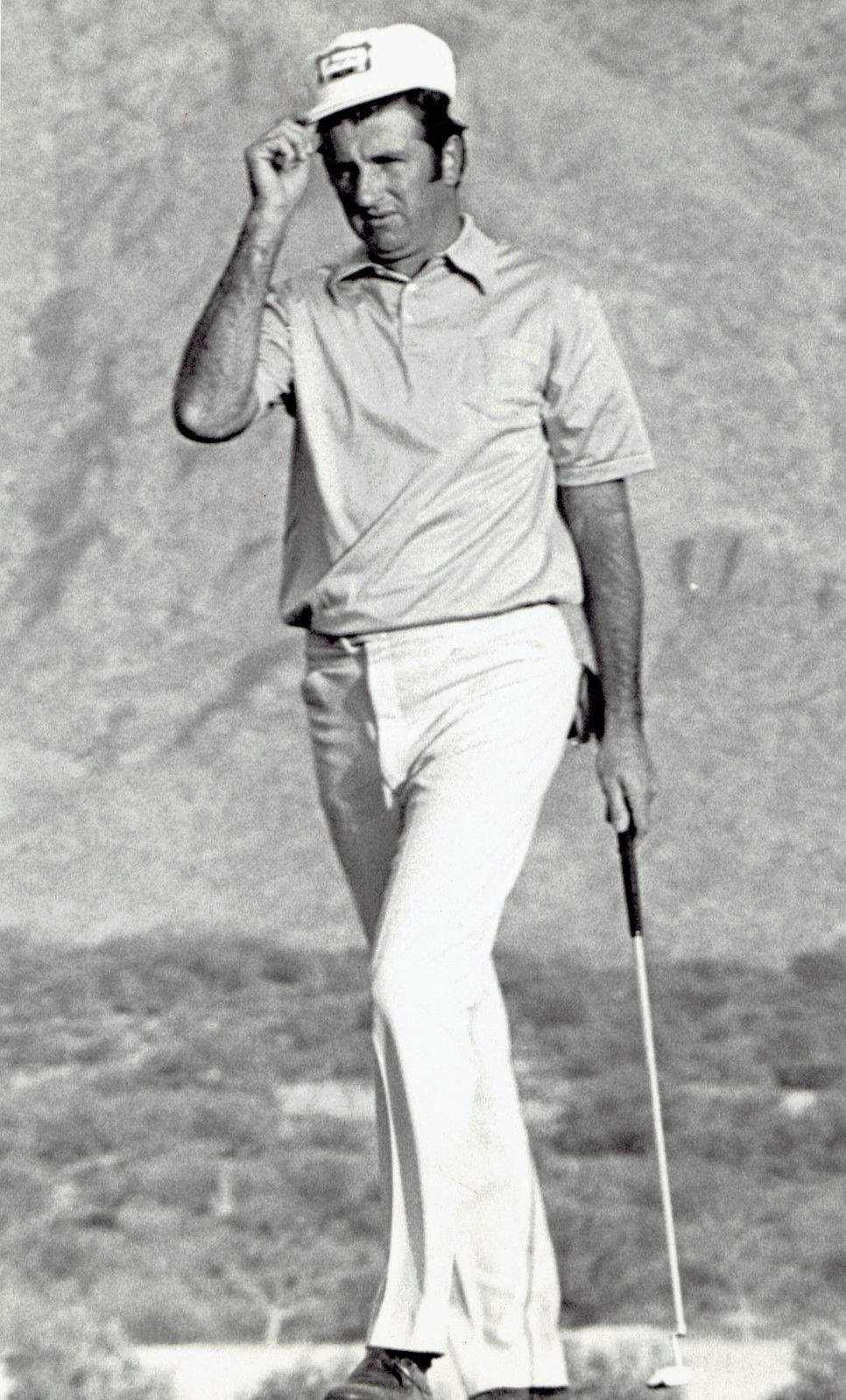
- Archer in 1972

Personal information
- Full name: George William Archer
- Nationality: United States
- Born: October 1, 1939 San Francisco, California, U.S.
- Died: September 25, 2005 (aged 65) Incline Village, Nevada, U.S.
- Height: 6 ft 5 1/2 in (1.97 m)
- Weight: 200 lb (91 kg; 14 st)
- Spouse: Donna Garman Archer
- Children: 2

Career
- Sport: Golf
- College: none
- Turned professional: 1964
- Former tours: PGA Tour; Champions Tour
- Professional wins: 43

Number of wins by tour
- PGA Tour: 13
- PGA Tour Champions: 19
- Other: 7 (regular); 4 (senior)

Best results in major championships (wins: 1)
- Masters Tournament: Won: 1969
- PGA Championship: T4: 1968
- U.S. Open: T5: 1971
- The Open Championship: WD: 1969

Achievements and awards
- Senior PGA Tour Player of the Year: 1991
- Senior PGA Tour Comeback Player of the Year: 1997

George Archer
- Military career
- Allegiance: United States
- Branch: U.S. Army
- Service years: early 1960s
- Conflicts: Cold War

George William Archer (October 1, 1939 – September 25, 2005) was an American professional golfer who won 13 events on the PGA Tour, including one major championship, the Masters in 1969.

== Early life ==
Archer was born in San Francisco, California, and raised just south in San Mateo. He grew to 6 ft 5 1/2 in (1.97 m) tall, and as a boy he dreamed of a basketball career, but took up golf at San Mateo High School after working as a caddy at the Peninsula Golf and Country Club near his home. He was kicked off the high school basketball team because he missed too many practices due to golf.

== Professional career ==
In 1964, Archer turned professional and claimed the first of 13 victories on the PGA Tour at the Lucky International Open the following year.

The leading achievement of his career was his win at the Masters in 1969. In the first round, he fired a 67, good for second place behind Billy Casper. His subsequent rounds of 73-69-72 earned him a one-stroke victory over runners-up Casper, Tom Weiskopf, and George Knudson.

Archer's other top-10 finishes in the majors came at the U.S. Open (10th in 1969, fifth in 1971) and the PGA Championship (fourth in 1968).

Archer was hampered by injuries throughout his career and had surgery on his left wrist (1975), back (1979) and left shoulder (1987). In 1996, he had his right hip replaced and two years later became the first man to win on the Senior PGA Tour (now the PGA Tour Champions) after having the surgery. He won 19 times on the Senior Tour between 1989 and 2000, although he did not win a senior major. Archer is also the only player in PGA Tour Champions history to win a tournament in each of the first three decades of its existence.

Archer is considered one of the game's all-time great putters, and at one time held the PGA Tour record for fewest putts over four rounds with 94 putts at the Sea Pines Heritage in 1980 (1.3 per hole). The record stood for nine years, until broken by Kenny Knox in 1989.

Archer was known as the "Golfing Cowboy," tracing to a summer job in his youth at his friend and sponsor, Lucky Lager Brewing Company founder Eugene Selvage's, Lucky Hereford Ranch in Gilroy.

Archer made Masters history in 1983 when he employed its first female caddy, his 19-year-old daughter Elizabeth, in the first year that outside caddies were allowed at Augusta National. He finished tied for 12th, his third-best at Augusta and final top-20 finish in a major. At the time Liz was a sophomore at Stanford University and had caddied for her father at twenty previous events; a member of the Cardinal track team, she threw the javelin and discus. She started caddying for him on tour in the summer of 1980, prior to her senior year at Gilroy High School.

== Personal life ==
=== Illiteracy ===
Six months after his death, Archer's widow, Donna, revealed in the March/April 2006 issue of Golf For Women magazine that he had suffered his entire life from a severe form of learning impairment. Despite years of effort and the consultation of many experts, he was never able to read more than the simplest sentences and could only write his own name. She reported that they never revealed this truth beyond their family and that Archer lived in constant fear that the secret of his illiteracy would be revealed.

In 2008, Donna created the George Archer Memorial Foundation for Literacy, a 501(c)(3) organization located in Incline Village, Nevada. The Foundation's mission is to raise funds to identify reading deficiencies, diagnose causes and effective treatments for learning disabilities, improve systems for training teachers, tutors and other educators in literacy issues, provide grants, stipends and scholarships for deserving students, and assist in the development of tools and techniques for the effective teaching of reading and writing skills. The Foundation's primary fundraiser is the George Archer Memorial Stroke of Genius Pro-Am golf tournament held every October since 2008 at the Peninsula Golf and Country Club, in San Mateo, California – the club at which Archer began his golf career.

== Death ==
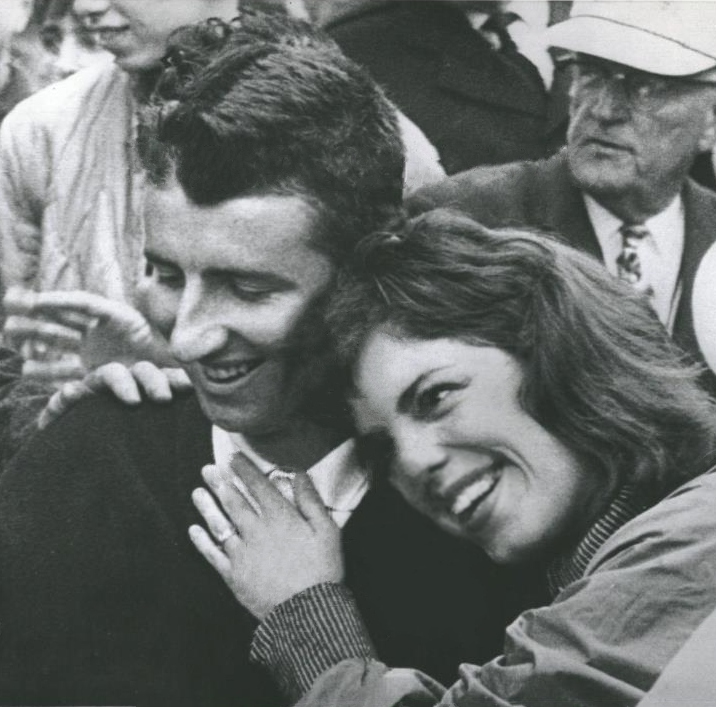
Archer with wife in 1965

Archer died of Burkitt's lymphoma – a lymphatic system malignancy – in Incline Village, Nevada in 2005, six days before his 66th birthday. He was survived by his wife, Donna, and two daughters, Elizabeth and Marilyn. He played his final round of golf with his wife in nearby Truckee on August 25, a month before his death.

== Amateur wins ==
- 1963 Trans-Mississippi Amateur, San Francisco City Championship

== Professional wins (43) ==
=== PGA Tour wins (13) ===
Legend
Major championships (1)
Other PGA Tour (12)

No.	Date	Tournament	Winning score	To par	Margin of victory	Runner(s)-up
1	Jan 31, 1965	Lucky International Open	68-73-69-68=278	−6	Playoff	(New Zealand) Bob Charles
2	Apr 2, 1967	Greater Greensboro Open	67-64-68-68=267	−17	2 strokes	(United States) Doug Sanders
3	Mar 25, 1968	Pensacola Open Invitational	66-68-69-65=268	−20	1 stroke	(England) Tony Jacklin, (United States) Dave Marr
4	May 12, 1968	Greater New Orleans Open Invitational	69-65-70-67=271	−17	2 strokes	(United States) Bert Yancey
5	Sep 22, 1968	PGA National Team Championship (with (United States) Bobby Nichols)	65-66-69-65=265	−22	2 strokes	(United States) Monty Kaser and (United States) Rives McBee
6	Jan 27, 1969	Bing Crosby National Pro-Am	72-68-72-71=283	−5	1 stroke	(United States) Bob Dickson, (United States) Dale Douglass, (United States) Howie Johnson
7	Apr 13, 1969	Masters Tournament	67-73-69-72=281	−7	1 stroke	(United States) Billy Casper, (Canada) George Knudson, (United States) Tom Weiskopf
8	Jan 31, 1971	Andy Williams-San Diego Open Invitational	67-72-68-65=272	−16	3 strokes	(United States) Dave Eichelberger
9	Sep 6, 1971	Greater Hartford Open Invitational	68-66-68-66=268	−16	Playoff	(United States) Lou Graham, (United States) J. C. Snead
10	Jan 9, 1972	Glen Campbell-Los Angeles Open	66-69-69-66=270	−14	Playoff	(United States) Tommy Aaron, (United States) Dave Hill
11	Apr 2, 1972	Greater Greensboro Open (2)	70-68-66-68=272	−12	Playoff	(United States) Tommy Aaron
12	Oct 3, 1976	Sahara Invitational	67-66-69-69=271	−13	2 strokes	(United States) Dave Hill, (United States) Don January
13	Sep 9, 1984	Bank of Boston Classic	69-66-70-65=270	−14	6 strokes	(United States) Frank Conner, (United States) Joey Sindelar

PGA Tour playoff record (4–3)

No.	Year	Tournament	Opponent(s)	Result
1	1965	Lucky International Open	(New Zealand) Bob Charles	Won with birdie on second extra hole
2	1969	Kaiser International Open Invitational	(United States) Billy Casper, (United States) Don January, (United States) Jack Nicklaus	Nicklaus won with birdie on second extra hole January eliminated by birdie on first hole
3	1970	Robinson Open Golf Classic	(Canada) George Knudson	Lost to par on fourth extra hole
4	1971	Greater Hartford Open Invitational	(United States) Lou Graham, (United States) J. C. Snead	Won with birdie on first extra hole
5	1972	Glen Campbell-Los Angeles Open	(United States) Tommy Aaron, (United States) Dave Hill	Won 18-hole playoff; Archer: −5 (66), Aaron: −3 (68), Hill: −3 (68)
6	1972	Dean Martin Tucson Open	(United States) Miller Barber	Lost to birdie on third extra hole after 18-hole playoff; Archer: E (72), Barber: E (72)
7	1972	Greater Greensboro Open	(United States) Tommy Aaron	Won with par on second extra hole

=== Other wins (7) ===
- 1963 Northern California Open, Northern California Medal Play
- 1964 Northern California Open
- 1967 Northern California Open
- 1969 Argentine Masters
- 1981 Colombian Open
- 1982 Philippines Invitational

=== Senior PGA Tour wins (19) ===
No.	Date	Tournament	Winning score	To par	Margin of victory	Runner(s)-up
1	Oct 15, 1989	Gatlin Brothers Southwest Senior Classic	69-72-68=209	−7	Playoff	(United States) Orville Moody, (United States) Jimmy Powell
2	Jan 7, 1990	MONY Senior Tournament of Champions	73-69-67-74=283	−5	7 strokes	(Australia) Bruce Crampton
3	Jul 8, 1990	Northville Long Island Classic	69-67-72=208	−16	1 stroke	(United States) Frank Beard, (United States) Charles Coody
4	Aug 26, 1990	GTE Northwest Classic	69-66-70=205	−15	2 strokes	(Australia) Bruce Crampton
5	Oct 28, 1990	Rancho Murieta Senior Gold Rush	70-68-66=204	−12	1 stroke	(United States) Dale Douglass
6	Aug 4, 1991	Northville Long Island Classic (2)	68-67-69=204	−12	2 strokes	(United States) Jim Colbert, (United States) Larry Laoretti
7	Sep 1, 1991	GTE North Classic	66-66-67=199	−17	1 stroke	(United States) Dale Douglass
8	Oct 13, 1991	Raley's Senior Gold Rush (2)	67-71-68=206	−10	1 stroke	(South Africa) Simon Hobday
9	May 10, 1992	Murata Reunion Pro-Am	66-72-73=211	−5	Playoff	(United States) Tommy Aaron
10	Aug 2, 1992	Northville Long Island Classic (3)	70-67-68=205	−9	2 strokes	(United States) Jim Albus
11	Aug 16, 1992	Bruno's Memorial Classic	66-68-74=208	−8	1 stroke	(United States) Jack Kiefer, (United States) Rocky Thompson
12	Jul 18, 1993	Ameritech Senior Open	67-66=133 (Note: Shortened to 36 holes due to weather.)	−11	1 stroke	(United States) Jim Colbert, (South Africa) Simon Hobday, (United States) Dick Rhyan
13	Jul 25, 1993	First of America Classic	67-69-63=199	−14	Playoff	(United States) Jim Colbert, (United States) Chi-Chi Rodríguez
14	Oct 17, 1993	Raley's Senior Gold Rush (3)	68-66-68=202	−14	1 stroke	(New Zealand) Bob Charles, (United States) Chi-Chi Rodríguez
15	Oct 31, 1993	Ping Kaanapali Classic	67-69-63=199	−14	Playoff	(United States) Dave Stockton, (United States) Lee Trevino
16	Feb 20, 1995	Toshiba Senior Classic	67-68-64=199	−11	1 stroke	(United States) Dave Stockton, (United States) Tom Wargo
17	May 14, 1995	Cadillac NFL Golf Classic	69-66-70=205	−11	1 stroke	(United States) Raymond Floyd, (United States) Bob Murphy
18	Aug 16, 1998	First of America Classic (2)	68-67-64=199	−17	5 strokes	(United States) Jim Dent
19	Jan 23, 2000	MasterCard Championship (2)	67-71-69=207	−9	2 strokes	(United States) Hale Irwin, (Australia) Graham Marsh, (United States) Dana Quigley, (United States) Lee Trevino

Senior PGA Tour Tour playoff record (4–2)

No.	Year	Tournament	Opponent(s)	Result
1	1989	Gatlin Brothers Southwest Senior Classic	(United States) Orville Moody, (United States) Jimmy Powell	Won with par on second extra hole
2	1991	Security Pacific Senior Classic	(United States) John Brodie, (United States) Chi-Chi Rodríguez	Brodie won with birdie on first extra hole
3	1992	GTE Suncoast Classic	(United States) Jim Colbert	Lost to birdie on fourth extra hole
4	1992	Murata Reunion Pro-Am	(United States) Tommy Aaron	Won with birdie on third extra hole
5	1993	First of America Classic	(United States) Jim Colbert, (United States) Chi-Chi Rodríguez	Won with par on third extra hole Rodríguez eliminated by par on first hole
6	1993	Ping Kaanapali Classic	(United States) Dave Stockton, (United States) Lee Trevino	Won with birdie on first extra hole

=== Other senior wins (4) ===
- 1990 Sports Shinko Cup, Princeville Classic
- 1991 Sports Shinko Cup
- 1994 Chrysler Cup (individual)

== Major championships ==
=== Wins (1) ===
Year	Championship	54 holes	Winning score	To par	Margin	Runners-up
1969	Masters Tournament	1 shot deficit	67-73-69-72=281	−7	1 stroke	(United States) Billy Casper, (Canada) George Knudson, (United States) Tom Weiskopf

=== Results timeline ===
Tournament	1964	1965	1966	1967	1968	1969
Masters Tournament				T16	T22	1
U.S. Open	T39		T17	WD	T16	T10
The Open Championship						WD
PGA Championship		T61		T55	T4	T69

Tournament	1970	1971	1972	1973	1974	1975	1976	1977	1978	1979
Masters Tournament	T31	35	T12	T43	WD	CUT	CUT	T19	WD	
U.S. Open	T30	T5	T65	T34				T27	CUT	
The Open Championship										
PGA Championship	T61	T34	T36	T51				T19	61	

Tournament	1980	1981	1982	1983	1984	1985	1986	1987	1988	1989
Masters Tournament	CUT	T11	T30	T12	T25	T53	CUT		CUT	T43
U.S. Open		T58								
The Open Championship										
PGA Championship	T17	CUT	T34	T67		T47				

Tournament	1990	1991	1992
Masters Tournament	49	WD	51
U.S. Open			
The Open Championship			
PGA Championship			

Win
Top 10
Did not play

CUT = missed the half-way cut
WD = withdrew
"T" = tied

=== Summary ===
Tournament	Wins	2nd	3rd	Top-5	Top-10	Top-25	Events	Cuts made
Masters Tournament	1	0	0	1	1	8	24	16
U.S. Open	0	0	0	1	2	4	12	10
The Open Championship	0	0	0	0	0	0	1	0
PGA Championship	0	0	0	1	1	3	15	14
Totals	1	0	0	3	4	15	52	40

- Most consecutive cuts made – 13 (1969 PGA – 1973 PGA)
- Longest streak of top-10s – 3 (1968 PGA – 1969 U.S. Open)

== See also ==
- List of golfers with most Champions Tour wins
