= Farmers Charity Classic =

The Farmers Charity Classic was a golf tournament on the Champions Tour from 1986 to 2004. It was played in Grand Rapids, Michigan area, first at the Elks Country Club (1986–1989), then at The Highlands (1990–1993), and finally at the Egypt Valley Country Club (1994–2004) in nearby Ada.

The purse for the 2004 tournament was US$1,600,000, with $240,000 going to the winner. The tournament was founded in 1986 as the Greater Grand Rapids Open.

== Winners ==
- 2004 Jim Thorpe
- 2003 Doug Tewell
- 2002 Jay Sigel
- 2001 Larry Nelson

Foremost Insurance Championship

- 2000 Larry Nelson
- 1999 Christy O'Connor Jnr

First of America Classic

- 1998 George Archer
- 1997 Gil Morgan
- 1996 Dave Stockton
- 1995 Jimmy Powell
- 1994 Tony Jacklin
- 1993 George Archer
- 1992 Gibby Gilbert
- 1991 Harold Henning

Greater Grand Rapids Open

- 1990 Don Massengale
- 1989 John Paul Cain
- 1988 Orville Moody
- 1987 Billy Casper
- 1986 Jim Ferree
