= Newport Cup (golf) =

The Newport Cup was a golf tournament on the Champions Tour from 1987 to 1992. It was played in Newport, Rhode Island at the Newport Country Club.

The purse for the 1992 tournament was US$400,000, with $60,000 going to the winner.

== Winners ==
- 1992 Jim Dent
- 1991 Larry Ziegler
- 1990 Al Kelley
- 1989 Jim Dent
- 1988 Walt Zembriski
- 1987 Miller Barber
