= Jim Dent =

American professional golfer (1939–2025)

Personal information
- Full name: James Lacey Dent
- Nationality: United States
- Born: May 9, 1939 Augusta, Georgia, U.S
- Died: May 2, 2025 (aged 85) Augusta, Georgia, U.S.
- Height: 6 ft 3 in (1.91 m)
- Weight: 224 lb (102 kg; 16.0 st)
- Spouse: Willye Malveaux Dent
- Children: 7

Career
- Sport: Golf
- College: Paine College
- Turned professional: 1966
- Former tours: PGA Tour; Champions Tour
- Professional wins: 16

Number of wins by tour
- PGA Tour Champions: 12
- Other: 4

Best results in major championships
- Masters Tournament: DNP
- PGA Championship: T34: 1978
- U.S. Open: T36: 1979
- The Open Championship: DNP

James Lacey Dent (May 9, 1939 – May 2, 2025) was an American professional golfer. Dent, who was nicknamed "Big Boy" because of his size and long drives, played professionally for more than 40 years on the PGA Tour and PGA Tour Champions. During his PGA Tour career, he won four unofficial tournaments and approximately a half-million dollars. In 1974 and 1975, Dent won the first two World Long Drive Championships. On the PGA Champions Tour, he won 12 tournaments and more than $9 million. In recognition of his career accomplishments, Dent was inducted into the Caddie Hall of Fame, Georgia Sports Hall of Fame, and National Black Golf Hall of Fame, among others.

== Early life ==
Dent was born in Augusta, Georgia, home of the Masters Tournament. He was the fourth of six children to Carrie and Tom Dent, who owned farmland near the Augusta Country Club. His mother died when he was six, and his father died when he was 12 years old. After his parents’ death, he was raised by his aunt, Mary Benton, a housekeeper, who inherited four of the Dent children. The family lived in Sand Hills, a predominantly black neighborhood listed on the National Register of Historic Places. As a teenager, he would play golf with friends on The Hill, a modest Augusta course. Following in his older brother Paul's footsteps, he got his first job working as a caddie at the Augusta National Golf Club. Paul Dent would later caddie for President Dwight Eisenhower.

At the age of 15, Dent caddied in his first Masters, carrying the bags for Bob Rosburg in the 1956 tournament. In addition to Rosburg, he caddied for Masters' golfers Bob Goalby, Walker Inman, and Frank Stranahan. When he was 17, he bought his first set of clubs for $30 from Henry Avery, who worked at Augusta Country Club.

Dent attended Laney High School and played on the football team with future NFL player Emerson Boozer.

== Amateur career ==
In 1959, Dent won a football scholarship and played end at Paine College, a HBCU in Augusta. Dent dropped out of college after a year to pursue a golf career.

Dent began his career in the Atlantic City, New Jersey area, working as a busboy and waiter at the Smithfield Inn, and practicing and playing golf at night. In 1961, he returned to Augusta to caddie for Patty Berg at the Titleholders Championship, that was an LPGA major; Berg finished second in the tournament.

In his 20s, Dent began entering local golf tournaments. He eventually moved to California, where he met Mose "Mo" Stevens, a wealthy black businessman who became his benefactor. Stevens would pay for Dent's daily practice sessions and sponsored him on the professional golf tour.

== Professional career ==
In 1966, Dent turned professional. He played on a minor league golf circuit and in events hosted by the United Golfers Association, a tour that attracted the top black golfers of that era. In 1969, Dent won the National Negro Open and other tournaments, including the $100,000 Queen Mary event.

=== PGA Tour ===
In 1968, Dent attended the PGA Tour's Qualifying Tournament and failed to earn his tour card. In 1969, he failed again to make the tour. In 1970, he qualified for the PGA Tour by finishing in a tie for tenth at qualifier at the Tucson Country Club.

He enjoyed an illustrious career on the Tour, making 450 career starts and maintaining a streak of 16 consecutive years on Tour appearing in at least 22 tournaments per season. Although he did not win an official 'regular' PGA Tour event, he collected 25 top-10s, played in five U.S. Opens, and six PGA Championships. His best chance to earn a Masters berth came in the 1980 U.S. Open, where he needed to finish in the top eight. Dent started the final round at 4-over par and T-28th after shooting rounds of 72-72-70 at the par-70 course. As the final round concluded, +2 made the top-8 and Dent would have needed a 68. He shot 76 in the final round and ended up tying for 38th.

In the 1970s, he was one of the longest hitters on the PGA Tour. It is estimated he could drive a golf ball between 315 and 340 yards. As a black golfer, he was not alone on the PGA Tour in the 1970s: Lee Elder, George Johnson, Charlie Sifford, Curtis Sifford, Nate Starks, Calvin Peete (who joined in 1975), and Chuck Thorpe – whose younger brother Jim joined the Tour in the late 1970s – were part of group of approximately twelve black players on Tour.

Dent's best finish in a regular PGA Tour event came at the end of the 1972 season: the Walt Disney World Open Invitational, which featured an 89-man field and was played from November 30 – December 3, 1972. Jack Nicklaus won the tournament in a final-round runaway finishing 21-under and winning by 9 strokes over Dent, Bobby Mitchell and Larry Wood. Dent started the final round of the Disney only two strokes behind Nicklaus in second alone, but Nicklaus fired a final-round 8-under par 64 and no one could keep up. In the end, Dent shot rounds of 71-69-65-71 and earned $11,600. In 1973, he earned $30,000 on the tour. His best year on the Tour was 1974 when he finished in the top-60 on the official money list.

In 1974 and 1975, Dent won the first two World Long Drive Championships. He won three consecutive Florida PGA Championships in 1976, 1977, and 1978. Dent achieved top-40 finishes in the PGA Championship in 1978, and the U.S. Open 1979.

1982 was the first PGA Tour season of the "All-Exempt Tour" which now exempted the top 125 money winners as opposed to only the top 60; Dent won $55,095 on Tour that year and easily retained exempt status for 1983. In 1983, he played in the Tournament Players Series and won the Michelob-Chattanooga Gold Cup Classic. He played in 10 PGA Tour events in 1988, finishing in the money six times and placing twice in the top-10. At the Provident Classic, played in Chattanooga, Tennessee in late August when Dent was 49, he shared the lead with Phil Blackmar, Bill Britton and Payne Stewart going into the final round. Dent shot a final round even-par 70 and finished T-3, five strokes short of winning.

=== PGA Tour Champions ===
In 1989, Dent was named Senior Tour Rookie-of-the-Year by several golf publications. He was a member of the 1990 and 1991 United States DuPont Cup teams.

In 1990, he claimed a career-best four wins, including recording the lowest 54-hole winning score, 17-under-par 199, when he won his second consecutive MONY Syracuse Senior Classic, and finished among the top-10 on the money list for the first time with almost $700,000 in earnings.

Throughout his senior career, Dent finished in the top-10 on the season-long money list seven times and won more than $9 million. In 2010, he retired from the Champions Tour.

== Personal life ==
Dent had a daughter, Charlene Dent-Wilkins, with his first wife, Evelyn Green Davis. Dent and his second wife, Willye Malveaux Dent, had a daughter born in 1973, followed by a son born in 1976. Nineteen years after the birth of their first son, the Dents decided to expand their family and adopted four children. His golf career enabled him to send all of his children to college and to buy a house for his aunt Mary, who had raised him.

Several of Dent's family members are involved in golf. His oldest son, James Dent, is the head pro at Augusta Municipal Golf Course. His son, Joseph Dent, played golf at Strawberry Crest High School, and is now pursuing a professional golf career. Joseph and his twin brother, Joshua, were named "2017 Youth Golfers of the Year" by the African American Golfers Hall of Fame. His grandson, Andre Lacey II, is the head men's and women's golf coach at Paine College.

=== Death ===
In 2025, Dent, who was recovering from a stroke, attended the Masters to celebrate the 50th anniversary of Lee Elder becoming the first black player to play in the tournament. The next day, Dent suffered a second stroke, and died on May 2, 2025, at the age of 85.

== Awards and honors ==
- In 1992, Dent was inducted into the National Black Golf Hall of Fame
- In 1994, he was inducted into the Georgia Golf Hall of Fame
- In 2006, Dent was inducted into the African American Golfers Hall of Fame
- In 2008, he was inducted into the Georgia Sports Hall of Fame
- In 2009, Dent was inducted into the Paine College Sports Hall of Fame
- In 2013, he was inducted into the Local Legends wing at the Augusta Museum of History
- In 2020, the road leading to Augusta Municipal Golf Course, also known as "The Patch," was renamed "Jim Dent Way" in his honor
- In 2022, Dent was inducted into the Caddie Hall of Fame

== Professional wins (16) ==
=== Tournament Players Series wins (1) ===
| No. | Date | Tournament | Winning score | Margin of victory | Runner-up |
|---|---|---|---|---|---|
| 1 | May 15, 1983 | Michelob-Chattanooga Gold Cup Classic | −12 (67-69-70-66=272) | 1 stroke | (United States) Lance Ten Broeck |

=== Other wins (3) ===
- 1976 Florida PGA Championship
- 1977 Florida PGA Championship
- 1978 Florida PGA Championship

=== Senior PGA Tour wins (12) ===
| No. | Date | Tournament | Winning score | Margin of victory | Runner(s)-up |
|---|---|---|---|---|---|
| 1 | Jun 25, 1989 | MONY Syracuse Senior Classic | −15 (69-68-64=201) | 1 stroke | (United States) Al Geiberger |
| 2 | Jul 30, 1989 | Newport Cup | −10 (67-73-66=206) | 1 stroke | (South Africa) Harold Henning |
| 3 | Mar 18, 1990 | Vantage at The Dominion | −11 (69-70-66=205) | 3 strokes | (South Africa) Harold Henning |
| 4 | Jun 17, 1990 | MONY Syracuse Senior Classic (2) | −17 (66-67-66=199) | 1 stroke | (United States) George Archer |
| 5 | Jul 15, 1990 | Kroger Senior Classic | −9 (67-66=133) (Note: Shortened to 36 holes due to weather.) | 1 stroke | (South Africa) Harold Henning |
| 6 | Sep 23, 1990 | Crestar Classic | −14 (73-64-65=202) | 1 stroke | (United States) Lee Trevino |
| 7 | Oct 26, 1992 | Newport Cup (2) | −12 (67-69-68=204) | 1 stroke | (United States) Jimmy Powell |
| 8 | Jun 5, 1994 | Bruno's Memorial Classic | −15 (66-68-67=201) | 2 strokes | (New Zealand) Bob Charles, (United States) Larry Gilbert, (United States) Kermit Zarley |
| 9 | Jun 11, 1995 | BellSouth Senior Classic | −13 (66-69-68=203) | 2 strokes | (United States) Bob Murphy |
| 10 | Aug 25, 1996 | Bank of Boston Senior Classic | −12 (69-68-67=204) | 1 stroke | (United States) Jay Sigel, (United States) Tom Wargo |
| 11 | May 11, 1997 | Home Depot Invitational | −8 (68-70-70=208) | Playoff | (United States) Larry Gilbert, (United States) Lee Trevino |
| 12 | May 10, 1998 | Home Depot Invitational (2) | −9 (67-68-72=207) | Playoff | (New Zealand) Bob Charles |

Senior PGA Tour playoff record (2–2)

| No. | Year | Tournament | Opponent(s) | Result |
|---|---|---|---|---|
| 1 | 1993 | Ralphs Senior Classic | (United States) Dale Douglass | Lost to birdie on first extra hole |
| 2 | 1997 | Home Depot Invitational | (United States) Larry Gilbert, (United States) Lee Trevino | Dent won with birdie on second extra hole Gilbert eliminated by birdie on first hole |
| 3 | 1998 | Home Depot Invitational | (New Zealand) Bob Charles | Won with par on third extra hole |
| 4 | 2000 | Vantage Championship | (United States) Gil Morgan, (United States) Larry Nelson | Nelson won with birdie on sixth extra hole Dent eliminated by birdie on first hole |

== See also ==
- 1970 PGA Tour Qualifying School graduates
- 1985 PGA Tour Qualifying School graduates
- List of golfers with most Champions Tour wins
