= 1975 Masters Tournament =

- Front cover of the 1975 Masters Guide

Tournament information
- Dates: April 10–13, 1975
- Location: Augusta, Georgia; 33.503°N 82.020°W
- Course: Augusta National Golf Club
- Organized by: Augusta National Golf Club
- Tour: PGA Tour

Statistics
- Par: 72
- Length: 7,020 yards (6,419 m)
- Field: 76 players, 46 after cut
- Cut: 148 (+4)
- Winner's share: $40,000

Champion
- (United States) Jack Nicklaus
- 276 (−12)

Location map
- Location in the United States Location in Georgia

The 1975 Masters Tournament was the 39th Masters Tournament, held April 10–13 at Augusta National Golf Club in Augusta, Georgia.

Jack Nicklaus won his fifth Masters and thirteenth major title, one stroke ahead of runners-up Johnny Miller and Tom Weiskopf. At age 40, Lee Elder became the first African-American to compete at the tournament, but missed the cut by four strokes.

The 1975 Masters is widely considered to be one of the greatest majors ever, with three great players at the peak of their games dueling in a Sunday finish.

Had a playoff been required, it would have been a full 18-hole round on Monday. Prior to the next Masters in 1976, a sudden-death format was introduced and was first used in 1979.

Nicklaus won his sixth green jacket eleven years later in 1986 at age 46.

== Course ==
Hole	Name	Yards	Par	Hole	Name	Yards	Par
1	Tea Olive	400	4	10	Camellia	485	4
2	Pink Dogwood	555	5	11	White Dogwood	445	4
3	Flowering Peach	360	4	12	Golden Bell	155	3
4	Flowering Crab Apple	220	3	13	Azalea	475	5
5	Magnolia	450	4	14	Chinese Fir	420	4
6	Juniper	190	3	15	Firethorn	520	5
7	Pampas	365	4	16	Redbud	190	3
8	Yellow Jasmine	530	5	17	Nandina	400	4
9	Carolina Cherry	440	4	18	Holly	420	4
Out		3,510	36	In		3,510	36
Source:				Total		7,020	72

== Field ==
1. Masters champions

Tommy Aaron (12), George Archer, Gay Brewer (12), Billy Casper (12), Charles Coody, Doug Ford, Bob Goalby (8), Jack Nicklaus (2,3,4,8,9,10,11,12), Arnold Palmer (8,9,12), Gary Player (3,4,8,9,10,11), Sam Snead (8,10), Art Wall Jr.

- Jack Burke Jr., Jimmy Demaret, Ralph Guldahl, Claude Harmon, Ben Hogan, Herman Keiser, Cary Middlecoff, Byron Nelson, Henry Picard, and Gene Sarazen did not play.

The following categories only apply to Americans

2. U.S. Open champions (last five years)

Hale Irwin (8,9), Johnny Miller (8,11), Lee Trevino (3,4,10,11,12)

3. The Open champions (last five years)

Tom Weiskopf (8,9,11,12)

4. PGA champions (last five years)

Dave Stockton (8,11)

5. 1974 U.S. Amateur semi-finalists

John Grace (a), Gary Koch (7,a), Jerry Pate (6,7,a), Curtis Strange (7,a)

6. Previous two U.S. Amateur and Amateur champions

Dick Siderowf (a), Craig Stadler (a)

7. Members of the 1974 U.S. Eisenhower Trophy team

George Burns (a)

8. Top 24 players and ties from the 1974 Masters Tournament

Buddy Allin (9,11), Miller Barber (11), Frank Beard (9), Jim Colbert (9,11), Ben Crenshaw, Raymond Floyd (9), Hubert Green (10,11), Jerry Heard, Dave Hill (10,11,12), Ralph Johnston, Bobby Nichols (11), Phil Rodgers, Chi-Chi Rodríguez (12), Dan Sikes

9. Top 16 players and ties from the 1974 U.S. Open

Forrest Fezler (11), Lou Graham (12), Tom Kite, John Mahaffey, Mike Reasor, Tom Watson (11), Bert Yancey, Larry Ziegler (11)

10. Top eight players and ties from 1974 PGA Championship

Al Geiberger (11)

11. Winners of PGA Tour events since the previous Masters

Rod Curl, Terry Diehl, Lee Elder, Pat Fitzsimons, Gary Groh, Richie Karl, Gene Littler, Mac McLendon, Bob Menne, Allen Miller, Bob Murphy, J. C. Snead (12), Ed Sneed

12. Members of the U.S. 1973 Ryder Cup team

Homero Blancas

13. Foreign invitations

Isao Aoki, Hugh Baiocchi, Maurice Bembridge (8), Bob Charles, Bobby Cole (10), Bruce Crampton (8), Roberto De Vicenzo, Bruce Devlin, Dale Hayes, Tony Jacklin (2), Lu Liang-Huan, Graham Marsh, Peter Oosterhuis, Masashi Ozaki, Victor Regalado (11)

- Numbers in brackets indicate categories that the player would have qualified under had they been American.

== Round summaries ==
=== First round ===
Thursday, April 10, 1975

Place	Player	Score	To par
1	(United States) Bobby Nichols	67	−5
T2	(United States) Allen Miller	68	−4
T2	(United States) Jack Nicklaus	68	−4
T4	(United States) Arnold Palmer	69	−3
T4	(United States) J. C. Snead	69	−3
T4	(United States) Tom Weiskopf	69	−3
T7	(United States) Billy Casper	70	−2
T7	(United States) Bob Murphy	70	−2
T7	(United States) Tom Watson	70	−2
T10	(United States) Tommy Aaron	71	−1
T10	(United States) Jerry Heard	71	−1
T10	(United States) Mac McLendon	71	−1
T10	(United States) Jerry Pate (a)	71	−1
T10	(United States) Sam Snead	71	−1
T10	(United States) Lee Trevino	71	−1
T10	(United States) Larry Ziegler	71	−1

- (a) = amateur

=== Second round ===
Friday, April 11, 1975

Snead, age 62, was one-over-par after 27 holes when he withdrew due to a back injury.

Place	Player	Score	To par
1	(United States) Jack Nicklaus	68-67=135	−9
T2	(United States) Billy Casper	70-70=140	−4
T2	(United States) Arnold Palmer	69-71=140	−4
T2	(United States) Tom Watson	70-70=140	−4
T5	(United States) Homero Blancas	72-69=141	−3
T5	(United States) Pat Fitzsimons	73-68=141	−3
T5	(United States) Bobby Nichols	67-74=141	−3
T5	(United States) J. C. Snead	69-72=141	−3
T5	(United States) Lee Trevino	71-70=141	−3
T5	(United States) Tom Weiskopf	69-72=141	−3

=== Third round ===
Saturday, April 12, 1975

Nicklaus entered the weekend with a five-shot lead but struggled with a one-over 73 in the final pairing with Arnold Palmer. Weiskopf carded a 66 (−6) to take a one-stroke lead and Miller a 65 to climb into solo third. Nicklaus three-putted four times on Saturday and was three-over-par on the last four holes to lose the lead.

Place	Player	Score	To par
1	(United States) Tom Weiskopf	69-72-66=207	−9
2	(United States) Jack Nicklaus	68-67-73=208	−8
3	(United States) Johnny Miller	75-71-65=211	−5
4	(United States) Tom Watson	70-70-72=212	−4
T5	(United States) Billy Casper	70-70-73=213	−3
T5	(United States) Bobby Nichols	67-74-72=213	−3
T7	(United States) Buddy Allin	73-69-73=215	−1
T7	(United States) Hubert Green	74-71-70=215	−1
T7	(United States) Allen Miller	68-75-72=215	−1
T7	(United States) Arnold Palmer	69-71-75=215	−1
T7	(United States) Lee Trevino	71-70-74=215	−1

=== Final round ===
Sunday, April 13, 1975

==== Summary ====
Although Nicklaus was in solo second after 54 holes, he played with Tom Watson in the penultimate pairing, followed by Miller and leader Weiskopf. Nicklaus was three-under for the round and led Weiskopf by a stroke at the 14th tee, but he bogeyed while Weiskopf birdied for a two-shot swing and a lead change. On the par-3 16th hole, Nicklaus listened on the green as both Weiskopf and Miller birdied on the 15th green, as he had done. Nicklaus then sank a 40-foot (12 m) birdie putt, while Weiskopf and Miller watched from the 16th tee. Weiskopf left his tee shot 80 feet (24 m) short and bogeyed, while Miller made par and birdied 17.

Both were a stroke behind with makeable birdie putts on the 72nd green to tie Nicklaus, who had just missed his 12-foot (3.7 m) birdie attempt. Miller missed left and low from 18 feet (5.5 m) while Weiskopf's eight-footer (2.4 m) missed right.

==== Final leaderboard ====
Champion
Silver Cup winner (low amateur)
(a) = amateur
(c) = past champion

Top 10
Place	Player	Score	To par	Money (US$)
1	(United States) Jack Nicklaus (c)	68-67-73-68=276	−12	40,000
T2	(United States) Johnny Miller	75-71-65-66=277	−11	21,250
T2	(United States) Tom Weiskopf	69-72-66-70=277	−11	21,250
T4	(United States) Hale Irwin	73-74-71-64=282	−6	12,500
T4	(United States) Bobby Nichols	67-74-72-69=282	−6	12,500
6	(United States) Billy Casper (c)	70-70-73-70=283	−5	7,500
7	(United States) Dave Hill	75-71-70-68=284	−4	6,000
T8	(United States) Hubert Green	74-71-70-70=285	−3	4,500
T8	(United States) Tom Watson	70-70-72-73=285	−3	4,500
T10	(United States) Tom Kite	72-74-71-69=286	−2	3,600
T10	(United States) J. C. Snead	69-72-75-70=286	−2	3,600
T10	(United States) Lee Trevino	71-70-74-71=286	−2	3,600

Leaderboard below the top 10
Place	Player	Score	To par	Money ($)
T13	(United States) Arnold Palmer (c)	69-71-75-72=287	−1	3,250
T13	(United States) Larry Ziegler	71-73-74-69=287	−1	3,250
T15	(South Africa) Bobby Cole	73-71-73-71=288	E	2,900
T15	(United States) Rod Curl	72-70-76-70=288	E	2,900
T15	(Australia) Bruce Devlin	72-70-76-70=288	E	2,900
T15	(United States) Allen Miller	68-75-72-73=288	E	2,900
T15	(United States) Art Wall Jr. (c)	72-74-72-70=288	E	2,900
T20	(United States) Buddy Allin	73-69-73-74=289	+1	2,550
T20	(United States) Ralph Johnston	74-73-69-73=289	+1	2,550
T22	(South Africa) Hugh Baiocchi	76-72-72-70=290	+2	2,275
T22	(United States) Pat Fitzsimons	73-68-79-70=290	+2	2,275
T22	(United States) Gene Littler	72-72-72-74=290	+2	2,275
T22	(Australia) Graham Marsh	75-70-74-71=290	+2	2,275
T26	(United States) Miller Barber	74-72-72-73=291	+3	2,000
T26	(England) Maurice Bembridge	75-72-75-69=291	+3	2,000
T26	(United States) Jerry Heard	71-75-72-73=291	+3	2,000
T26	(United States) Dave Stockton	72-72-73-74=291	+3	2,000
T30	(United States) George Burns (a)	72-72-76-72=292	+4	0
T30	(United States) Ben Crenshaw	72-71-75-74=292	+4	1,950
T30	(United States) Forrest Fezler	76-71-71-74=292	+4	1,950
T30	(United States) Raymond Floyd	72-73-79-68=292	+4	1,950
T30	(South Africa) Gary Player (c)	72-74-73-73=292	+4	1,950
T30	(Mexico) Victor Regalado	76-72-72-72=292	+4	1,950
T30	(United States) Bert Yancey	74-71-74-73=292	+4	1,950
37	(United States) Jerry Pate (a)	71-75-78-69=293	+5	0
T38	(United States) Tommy Aaron (c)	71-75-76-72=294	+6	1,850
T38	(United States) Gary Groh	72-76-71-75=294	+6	1,850
T40	(United States) Charles Coody (c)	72-75-75-73=295	+7	1,850
T40	(United States) Lou Graham	72-72-77-74=295	+7	1,850
42	(United States) Bob Murphy	70-72-80-74=296	+8	1,750
T43	(United States) Homero Blancas	72-69-79-77=297	+9	1,700
T43	(Chinese Taipei) Lu Liang-Huan	73-74-78-72=297	+9	1,700
T43	(Japan) Masashi Ozaki	73-73-83-68=297	+9	1,700
46	(United States) Richie Karl	72-75-79-76=302	+14	1,650
CUT	(United States) Gay Brewer (c)	77-72=149	+5	
CUT	(Argentina) Roberto De Vicenzo	74-75=149	+5	
CUT	(United States) Mac McLendon	71-78=149	+5	
CUT	(United States) Mike Reasor	74-75=149	+5	
CUT	(United States) Phil Rodgers	77-72=149	+5	
CUT	(United States) Chi-Chi Rodríguez	74-75=149	+5	
CUT	(United States) Frank Beard	76-74=150	+6	
CUT	(New Zealand) Bob Charles	76-74=150	+6	
CUT	(United States) Jim Colbert	75-75=150	+6	
CUT	(United States) Terry Diehl	72-78=150	+6	
CUT	(United States) Al Geiberger	79-71=150	+6	
CUT	(United States) Ed Sneed	74-76=150	+6	
CUT	(Japan) Isao Aoki	75-76=151	+7	
CUT	(South Africa) Dale Hayes	77-74=151	+7	
CUT	(England) Tony Jacklin	77-74=151	+7	
CUT	(United States) Gary Koch (a)	77-74=151	+7	
CUT	(England) Peter Oosterhuis	79-72=151	+7	
CUT	(United States) George Archer (c)	80-72=152	+8	
CUT	(United States) Lee Elder	74-78=152	+8	
CUT	(United States) Doug Ford (c)	78-74=152	+8	
CUT	(United States) John Mahaffey	77-75=152	+8	
CUT	(United States) Curtis Strange (a)	75-77=152	+8	
CUT	(United States) Bob Goalby (c)	81-72=153	+9	
CUT	(United States) Dick Siderowf (a)	75-78=153	+9	
CUT	(United States) John Grace (a)	79-75=154	+10	
CUT	(Australia) Bruce Crampton	76-79=155	+11	
CUT	(United States) Craig Stadler (a)	80-76=156	+12	
CUT	(United States) Bob Menne	76-82=158	+14	
CUT	(United States) Dan Sikes	76-82=158	+14	
WD	(United States) Sam Snead (c)	71	−1	

==== Scorecard ====
Hole	1	2	3	4	5	6	7	8	9	10	11	12	13	14	15	16	17	18
Par	4	5	4	3	4	3	4	5	4	4	4	3	5	4	5	3	4	4
(United States) Nicklaus	−7	−8	−9	−9	−10	−10	−10	−10	−11	−11	−11	−11	−11	−10	−11	−12	−12	−12
(United States) Miller	−5	−6	−5	−6	−6	−7	−7	−8	−9	−9	−8	−8	−9	−9	−10	−10	−11	−11
(United States) Weiskopf	−9	−9	−10	−10	−10	−11	−11	−11	−11	−11	−10	−10	−10	−11	−12	−11	−11	−11
(United States) Irwin	+2	+1	E	−1	−1	−1	−1	−2	−2	−3	−3	−3	−4	−4	−5	−5	−6	−6
(United States) Nichols	−3	−3	−4	−4	−4	−4	−4	−5	−5	−5	−5	−6	−6	−6	−6	−6	−6	−6
(United States) Casper	−3	−3	−4	−4	−4	−4	−4	−5	−5	−5	−4	−4	−5	−5	−5	−5	−5	−5
(United States) Hill	E	−1	−1	−1	−1	−1	−1	−2	−2	−1	−2	−2	−3	−3	−4	−4	−4	−4
(United States) Green	E	E	+1	+1	+1	+1	+1	+1	+1	E	E	E	−2	−2	−2	−2	−2	−3
(United States) Watson	−4	−4	−4	−4	−4	−4	−5	−5	−6	−6	−5	−5	−6	−6	−6	−2	−2	−3
(United States) Kite	+1	E	E	−1	−1	−1	−1	E	E	E	E	E	−1	−1	−2	−2	−2	−2
(United States) Snead	+1	+1	+1	+1	+1	E	E	E	E	−1	E	E	−1	E	−1	−1	−1	−2
(United States) Trevino	−1	−1	−2	−3	−3	−3	−2	−3	−3	−3	−2	−3	−3	−3	−3	−2	−2	−2

Cumulative tournament scores, relative to par

Eagle	Birdie	Bogey	Double bogey	Triple bogey+
