= 2022 U.S. Senior Women's Open =

Golf tournament

Tournament information
- Dates: August 25–28, 2022
- Location: Dayton, Ohio, U.S. 39.680°N 84.196°W
- Courses: NCR Country Club, South Course
- Organized by: USGA
- Tour: Legends Tour
- Format: 72 holes stroke play

Statistics
- Par: 73
- Length: 6,231 yards (5,698 m)
- Field: 120 players, 52 after cut
- Cut: 164 (+18) (50 top players and ties after 36 holes)
- Prize fund: $1,000,000
- Winner's share: $180,000

Champion
- (United States) Jill McGill
- 289 (−3)
- Location in the United States Location in Ohio

The 2022 U.S. Senior Women's Open took place August 25–28 at NCR Country Club in Dayton, Ohio, and was the fourth U.S. Senior Women's Open. It was a professional golf tournament organized by the United States Golf Association, open to women over 50 years of age.

Jill McGill won by one stroke over Leta Lindley.

== Venue ==
The hosting club had previously hosted the 2005 U.S. Senior Open, the 1986 U.S. Women's Open and the 1969 PGA Championship on its South Course, where the championship took place.

The club's two courses, the South Course and the North Course, located in Kettering, 7 kilometres south of the city center of Dayton, Ohio, were designed by Dick Wilson and opened in 1954.

=== Course layout ===
The course layout differed between each round. Approximate length is shown.

Hole	Yards	Par	Hole	Yards	Par
1	443	5	10	511	5
2	131	3	11	352	4
3	379	4	12	350	4
4	362	4	13	125	3
5	504	5	14	357	4
6	480	5	15	180	3
7	355	4	16	448	5
8	158	3	17	333	4
9	376	4	18	387	4
Out	3,188	37	In	3,043	36
			Total	6,231	73

== Format ==
The walking-only tournament was played over 72 holes of stroke play, with the top 50 and ties making the 36-hole cut. In the event of a tie after 72 holes, a two-hole aggregate playoff would take place.

== Field ==
Qualifying for the championship was open to any professional or amateur golfer who was 50 years of age or over on the start of the tournament on 25 August 2022, however restricted by a certain handicap level. 48 players entered the competition through some of several exemption categories, including winners of the U.S. Women's Open, winners of other LPGA majors and winners of the U.S. Women's Amateur. 72 players qualified through sectional qualifying at 16 sites nationwide.

When entries closed on July 6, 377 entries were accepted. The final field of 120 players, 37 amateurs and 83 professionals, included 2021 champion Annika Sörenstam.

Eleven countries were represented in the field – Australia (2), Canada (6), England (4), France (1), India (1), Italy (1), Japan (7), Peru (1), Scotland (2), Sweden (5) and United States (90).

=== Exempt players ===
Many players were exempt in multiple categories. Players are listed only once, in the first category in which they became exempt.

Players eligible in categories with an upper age limit of 52, 54 or 59, were eligible regardless of age provided they were 50 or older.

Each exemption category required players to have reached their 50th birthday on or before August 25, 2022.

1. Former winners of the U.S. Senior Women's Open Championship, ages 50–65:

- Laura Davies (2018), Helen Alfredsson (2019), Annika Sörenstam (2021)

2. From the 2021 U.S. Senior Women's Open Championship, the 20 lowest scorers and anyone tying for 20th place:

- Cheryl Anderson, Dana Ebster, Tammie Green, Juli Inkster, Christa Johnson, Trish Johnson, Rosie Jones, Martha Leach (a), Catriona Matthew, Michelle McGann, Barbara Moxness, Liselotte Neumann, Ellen Port (a), Michele Redman, Yuko Saito, Kris Tschetter, Karen Weiss, Kimberly Williams
- Suzy Green-Roebuck – did not play

3. From the 2021 U.S. Senior Women's Open Championship, the amateur(s) returning the lowest 72-hole score:

4. Winners of the U.S. Women's Open Championship (10-year exemption):

- Amy Alcott, JoAnne Carner, Jane Geddes, Alison Nicholas, Hollis Stacy, Jan Stephenson

5. From the 2021 and 2022 U.S. Women's Open Championship, any age eligible player returning a 72-hole score

6. Any professional or applicant for reinstatement who has won the U.S. Women's Amateur Championship (three-year exemption):

- Amy Fruhwirth, Jill McGill

7. Winners of the U.S. Women's Amateur (must be an amateur; five-year exemption):

- Carol Semple Thompson (a)
- Anne Sander (a) – did not play

8. Winners of the 2019 and 2021 U.S. Senior Women's Amateur Championship, and the 2021 runner-up (must be an amateur):

- Lara Tennant (a) (2019 and 2021 champion)

9. Winners of the 2019 and 2021 U.S. Women's Mid-Amateur Championship (must be an amateur)

10. Playing members of the two most recent United States and Great Britain & Ireland Curtis Cup Teams, and the two most current United States Women's World Amateur Teams (must be an amateur)

11. Winners of the 2017–2019, and 2021 Senior LPGA Championship, and the 2019 and 2021 runners-up (must be age-eligible; the Senior LPGA Championship age minimum is 45)

12. From the 2021 Senior LPGA Championship, the 10 lowest scorers and anyone tying for 10th place:

- Lisa DePaulo, Moira Dunn-Bohls, Leta Lindley

13. From the final 2021 official Legends Tour Performance Points list, the top 30 point leaders and ties (note the Legends Tour age minimum is 45):

- Danielle Ammaccapane, Jean Bartholomew, Jackie Gallagher-Smith, Lisa Grimes, Becky Iverson, Nicole Jeray, Cathy Johnston-Forbes, Susie Redman, Maggie Will
- Jane Crafter – did not play

14. Winners of Legends Tour events, of a minimum of 36 holes, excluding team events, in 2019, 2021 and 2022

15. Winners of the LPGA Teaching & Club Professional Championship (Championship Division) from 2016–21, and the five lowest scores and ties from the most recent Championship (2021)

16. From the 2021 LPGA Teaching & Club Professional Championship (Senior Division), the three lowest scores and ties:

- Tonya Gill Danckaert

17. Winners of the 2021 R&A Women's Senior Amateur and Canadian Women's Senior Amateur Championships (must be an amateur):

- Shelly Stouffer (a) (Canadian Women's Senior Amateur)

18. Winners of the following events when deemed a major by the LPGA Tour, Chevron Championship (1983–present); Evian Championship (2013–present); Women's British Open (2001–present); du Maurier Classic (1979–2000); Women's PGA Championship (1955–present); Titleholders Championship (1946–1966, 1972) or Women's Western Open (1930–1967) (10-year exemption):

- Brandie Burton, Pat Hurst
- Donna Andrews, Alice Miller – did not play

19. From the final 2021 LPGA Tour all-time money list, the top 10 age-eligible players not otherwise exempt as of February 16, 2022:

- Carin Hjalmarsson
- Val Skinner – did not play

20. Winners of LPGA Tour events 2016–2022

21. Playing members of the five most recent United States and European Solheim Cup Teams

22. From the 2021 final official Ladies European Tour and Japan LPGA Tour career money lists, the top five money leaders

24. Special exemptions as selected by the USGA

=== Qualifiers ===
Additional players qualified through sectional qualifying tournaments, which took place July 11 – August 8, 2022, at 16 different sites across the United States.

Date	Location	Venue	Qualifiers (Note: (a) – denotes amateur) (Note: Players who do not play in the championship, despite being qualified, written in italics.)
Jul 11	Brandenton, Florida	Brandenton Country Club	Sue Ertl, Mary Jane Hiestand (a), Pat Shriver, Barb Bunkowsky, Laura Carson (a), Laurel Kean, Susie Keane (a)
Jul 12	White Bear Lake, Minnesota	White Bear Yacht Club	Kelley Brooke, Kristal Parker
Jul 13	Salisbury, North Carolina	Country Club of Salisbury	Brenda Kuehn (a) (did not play), Denise Killeen, Joy Bonhurst, Pam Prescott, Laura Shanahan Rowe, Jayne Pardus, Anne Marie Palli
Jul 13	Northbrook, Illinois	Heritage Oaks Golf Club	Tracy Hanson, Audra Burks, Elaine Crosby, Jamie Fischer, Eriko Gejo, Kaori Shimura, Maggie Leef (a)
Jul 18	Mansfield, Texas	Walnut Creek Country Club	Kay Daniel (a), Martha Linscott (a), Michaelyn Farmer (a), Julie Oxendine (a)
Jul 18	Roseville, California	Sierra View Country Club	Teresa Ishiguro, Karen Garcia (a), Lynne Cowan (a), Sally Voss Krueger (a), Tina Barker (a), Itsuko Moridaira (a)
Jul 20	Goodyear, Arizona	Pebble Creek Golf Resort (Eagle's Nest Course)	Sue Wooster (a), Kristi Albers, Tina Tombs, Dina Ammaccapane
Jul 21	Marietta, Georgia	Atlanta Country Club	Patricia Ehrhart (a), Suzanne Strudwick, Theresa Mahlik (a), Laura Coble (a)
Jul 21	Blacklick, Ohio	Jefferson Country Club	Adele Snyder, Christine Lindsey, Judith Kyrinis (a), Marion Reid (a), Karen Bennett, Cheryl Fox, Gigi Higgins (a)
Jul 25	Niwot, Colorado	Lake Valley Golf Club	Sherry Andonian-Smith, Yukako Matsumoto, Janet Moore (a)
Jul 25	Newton, Massachusetts	Charles River Country Club	Lisa McGill (a), Anna Morales (a), Helene Chartrand (a), Catherine Panton-Lewis
Jul 26	Rye, New York	Rye Golf Club	Wendy Modic, Michelle Dobek, CJ Reeves
Jul 26	Allentown, Pennsylvania	Lehigh Country Club	Smriti Mehra, Yuko Ogura, Suzi Spotleson (a), Stephenie Harris (a), Noreen Mohler (a)
Jul 27	Springfield, Virginia	Springfield Golf & Country Club	Catrin Nilsmark, Stefania Croce
Aug 8	DuPont, Washington	The Home Course	Kim Shek (a), Dana Bates
Aug 8	Calabasas, California	Calabasas Country Club	Angela Buzminski, Yuka Shiroto, Kathy Kurata (a), Leslie Spalding, Sherry Wright (a), Avis Brown-Riley

== Results ==
52 players, 46 professionals and six amateurs, made the 36-hole cut.

=== Final leaderboard ===
Sunday, August 28, 2022

Place	Player	Score	To par	Money ($)
1	(United States) Jill McGill	74-71-71-73=289	−3	180,000
2	(United States) Leta Lindley	69-75-72-74=290	−2	108,000
T3	(Sweden) Helen Alfredsson	70-70-75-76=291	−1	58,960
T3	(Scotland) Catriona Matthew	72-76-70-73=291	−1	58,960
T5	(England) Laura Davies	71-76-68-78=293	+1	36,010
T5	(United States) Juli Inkster	70-70-74-72=293	+1	36,010
T5	(Sweden) Annika Sörenstam	73-70-73-77=293	+1	36,010
8	(Sweden) Catrin Nilsmark	69-76-76-73=294	+2	28,890
T9	(Sweden) Liselotte Neumann	76-73-71-75=295	+3	25,024
T9	(United States) Michelle Redman	75-74-71-75=295	+3	25,024
