= Jimmy Wright (golfer) =

American professional golfer (born 1939)

Personal information
- Nationality: United States
- Born: December 1, 1939 (age 86) Bentonville, Arkansas, U.S.
- Height: 6 ft 3 in (1.91 m)
- Weight: 190 lb (86 kg; 14 st)
- Spouse: Joyce McGugin

Career
- Sport: Golf
- College: Oklahoma State University
- Turned professional: 1961
- Former tour: PGA Tour
- Professional wins: 12

Best results in major championships
- Masters Tournament: T29: 1970
- PGA Championship: 4th: 1969
- U.S. Open: CUT: 1970, 1971, 1977, 1978, 1981, 1982
- The Open Championship: CUT: 1974

Jimmy Wright (born December 1, 1939) is an American professional golfer.

== Early life ==
Wright was born on a farm in Bentonville, Arkansas. At the age of 10, he moved to Enid, Oklahoma where he spent most of his youth. He started caddying at a local golf course when he was 12 and began playing golf the following year. He shot a 72 on the first 9 holes he ever played. Five years later, on the same par-36 nine holes, he shot an 8-under-par 28. In 1957, he won the State High School Championship.

== Amateur career ==
After high school, Wright attended Oklahoma State University in Stillwater, Oklahoma where he graduated with a Bachelor of Arts Degree in Business Administration in January 1962. Wright was an All-American for three years at Oklahoma State (at the time freshmen were not allowed to compete). He was the only sophomore to make the All-American team. In 1960, Wright won the Oklahoma Amateur.

== Professional career ==
In September 1961, he turned professional and won the first professional tournament he entered. After graduating from college, he played the PGA Tour part-time in 1962 and 1963.

Wright joined the National Guard in 1963 and headed off to basic military training. Upon fulfilling his active duty obligation to the National Guard, he returned home to marry Joyce McGugin in March 1964.

Shortly thereafter, Wright resumed his golf career and was selected for the number one assistant position at Winged Foot Golf Club in Mamaroneck, New York, where he worked under the tutelage of respected and noted golf instructor Claude Harmon. Wright was at Winged Foot from 1964 until the fall of 1965 when he was selected as the Head Professional of the Inwood Country Club in Long Island, New York. While at Inwood, Wright played part-time on the PGA Tour, making 48 starts between 1968 and 1972.

After a decade at Inwood, Wright replaced Herman Barron as the head golf professional of the Fenway Golf Club in Scarsdale, New York. He held this position from 1976 to 1988, when he accepted the position as head golf professional at The Falls Country Club in Lake Worth, Florida. Five years later, Wright became the Director of Golf at The Oaks Club in Osprey, Florida. Wright worked at The Oaks until 2002 before embarking on an enterprise of opening a golf retail store in Sarasota, Florida called The Wright Approach.

In 2005, Wright closed his store and accepted a position as the Director of Golf at a new premier private club in Bradenton, Florida called The Concession Golf Club - a Jack Nicklaus Signature Golf Course designed in association with Tony Jacklin. The Concession, which was honored as the "Best New Private Course" of 2006 by Golf Digest, commemorates one of the greatest acts of sportsmanship in the history of golf, when Nicklaus conceded a two-foot putt to Jacklin in the 1969 Ryder Cup matches. Wright's love for and commitment to The Concession Golf Club and the traditions of the game and competitive play continues today in the role of Tournament Director.

== Results in major championships ==
Tournament	1967	1968	1969	1970	1971	1972	1973	1974	1975	1976	1977	1978	1979	1980	1981	1982	1983	1984
Masters Tournament			T29															
U.S. Open				CUT	CUT						CUT	CUT			CUT	CUT		
The Open Championship								CUT										
PGA Championship	T52		4	T55	CUT	T48	CUT	CUT	T54	T60	CUT		T42			CUT		CUT

Top 10
Did not play

CUT = missed the halfway cut
"T" = tied

== Accomplishments ==
- Finished 4th in 1969 PGA Championship at NCR Country Club in Dayton, Ohio (highest finish of a club professional in any PGA Championship since it went to stroke play)
- Participated in 21 major championships
- Participated in 13 PGA Championships
- Participated in six U.S. Opens
- Participated in Masters Tournament (1970) - finished T-29th
- 14 National Club Pro Championships (finished 2nd in 1969; 4th in 1968; 5th in 1978 and 1981)
- 1990 won the first senior tournament he entered (Sandpiper Golf Club, Port Saint Lucie, Fla.)

Holder of 15 course records:

- Most notable: a 59, 60 and 62. The 59 was shot in 1981 at MeadowLake Golf Club in Enid, Oklahoma. The 60 was shot in 1963 at Oakwood Country Club in Enid. The 62 was shot during the second round of the 1976 Westchester Classic at Westchester Country Club in Rye, New York.
- Another record, 66, occurred during the 1971 International Pro-Am at Carnoustie Golf Links in Scotland.
- Lastly, Wright shot a 65 at the Coral Creek Club in Placida, Florida at the age of 60.

PGA Club Professional records:

- Only club professional to compete in the Masters Tournament in the past 50 years
- Highest finish of a club professional in the PGA Championship since it went to the stroke play format, 1969
- Played in 21 major championships
- Won 118 professional golf tournaments

== Awards and honors ==
- Wright was a three-time NCAA All-American at Oklahoma State University (1959–1961)
- Wright earned the Metropolitan PGA Player of the Year award seven times: in 1969, 1972–1976, and 1980
- In 1982, Wright was inducted into the Metropolitan Hall of Fame

== Professional wins (12) ==
- 1969 Metropolitan Open, Long Island Open
- 1970 Long Island Open, Long Island PGA Championship
- 1972 Metropolitan PGA Championship, Long Island Open
- 1973 Long Island PGA Championship
- 1974 Metropolitan PGA Championship, Long Island Open, Long Island PGA Championship
- 1976 Metropolitan PGA Championship
- 1980 Metropolitan PGA Championship

== U.S. national team appearances ==
- PGA Cup: 1975 (winners), 1979, 1982 (winners)
