= 1976 Masters Tournament =

- Front cover of the 1976 Masters Guide

Tournament information
- Dates: April 8–11, 1976
- Location: Augusta, Georgia; 33.503°N 82.020°W
- Course: Augusta National Golf Club
- Organized by: Augusta National Golf Club
- Tour: PGA Tour

Statistics
- Par: 72
- Length: 7,030 yards (6,428 m)
- Field: 72 players, 47 after cut
- Cut: 150 (+6)
- Winner's share: $40,000

Champion
- (United States) Raymond Floyd
- 271 (−17)
- Location in the United States Location in Georgia

The 1976 Masters Tournament was the 40th Masters Tournament, held April 8–11 at Augusta National Golf Club in Augusta, Georgia.

Raymond Floyd won his only Masters title, eight strokes ahead of runner-up Ben Crenshaw. He shot a 131 (−13) over the first two rounds, then posted two rounds of 70 on the weekend to tie Jack Nicklaus' record of 271 (−17), set in 1965. In the first three rounds, Floyd was under-par on every par-5, with eleven birdies and an eagle, and his 54-hole total of 201 (−15) was the lowest ever. Defending champion Nicklaus was the nearest pursuer, eight shots back at 209. It was the second of Floyd's four major titles. Tiger Woods broke the 72-hole record by a stroke 21 years later in 1997 with 270 (−18), which was tied by Jordan Spieth in 2015.

Beginning with this Masters, a sudden-death playoff format was introduced, and originally planned to start at the first hole. After three years without use, it was changed to begin on the 10th hole in 1979; used for the first time that year, it ended on the eleventh green. In 2004, the playoff was changed to start on the 18th hole and then alternate with the adjacent 10th hole. Prior to 1976, playoffs were full 18-hole rounds on Monday, and the last was won by Billy Casper in 1970. The first playoff in 1935 was the exception at 36 holes.

Floyd was the fourth wire-to-wire winner in Masters history, following Craig Wood in 1941, Arnold Palmer in 1960, and Nicklaus in 1972. The next was Jordan Spieth, 39 years later, in 2015.

== Field ==
1. Masters champions

Tommy Aaron, George Archer, Gay Brewer, Billy Casper (8,10,11,12), Charles Coody, Doug Ford, Bob Goalby, Jack Nicklaus (2,4,8,9,10,11,12), Arnold Palmer (8,9), Gary Player (3,4), Sam Snead, Art Wall Jr. (8,11)

- Jack Burke Jr., Jimmy Demaret, Ralph Guldahl, Claude Harmon, Ben Hogan, Herman Keiser, Cary Middlecoff, Byron Nelson, Henry Picard, and Gene Sarazen did not play.

The following categories only apply to Americans

2. U.S. Open champions (last five years)

Lou Graham (9,12), Hale Irwin (8,9,10,11,12), Johnny Miller (8,11,12), Lee Trevino (3,4,8,12)

3. The Open champions (last five years)

Tom Watson (8,9,11), Tom Weiskopf (8,10,11,12)

4. PGA champions (last five years)

5. 1975 U.S. Amateur semi-finalists

Henri DeLozier (a), Keith Fergus (a), Fred Ridley (6,a)

- Andy Bean forfeited his exemption by turning professional.

6. Previous two U.S. Amateur and Amateur champions

Vinny Giles (7,a)

- Jerry Pate (7) forfeited his exemption by turning professional.

7. Members of the 1975 U.S. Walker Cup team

William C. Campbell (a), John Grace (a), Jay Haas (a), Dick Siderowf (a), Curtis Strange (a)

- George Burns, Gary Koch, and Craig Stadler forfeited their exemptions by turning professional.

8. Top 24 players and ties from the 1975 Masters Tournament

Buddy Allin, Rod Curl, Pat Fitzsimons (9), Hubert Green (11), Dave Hill (10,11), Ralph Johnston, Tom Kite, Gene Littler (10,11,12), Allen Miller, Bobby Nichols, J. C. Snead (11,12), Larry Ziegler

9. Top 16 players and ties from the 1975 U.S. Open

Frank Beard, Ben Crenshaw (11), Joe Inman, John Mahaffey, Rik Massengale (11), Bob Murphy (12), Eddie Pearce, Jim Wiechers

10. Top eight players and ties from 1975 PGA Championship

Andy North

11. Winners of PGA Tour events since the previous Masters

Don Bies, Jim Colbert, Raymond Floyd (12), Al Geiberger (12), Bob Gilder, Don Iverson, Don January, Tom Jenkins, Roger Maltbie, Jerry McGee, Dean Refram

12. Members of the U.S. 1975 Ryder Cup team

13. Foreign invitations

Hugh Baiocchi (8), Maurice Bembridge, Bobby Cole (8), Bruce Crampton (10,11), Bruce Devlin (8), Priscillo Diniz (a), Dale Hayes, Graham Marsh (8), Takashi Murakami, Jack Newton, Peter Oosterhuis (9), Masashi Ozaki, Bob Shearer

- Numbers in brackets indicate categories that the player would have qualified under had they been American.

== Round summaries ==
=== First round ===
Thursday, April 8, 1976

Place	Player	Score	To par
1	(United States) Raymond Floyd	65	−7
2	(United States) Andy North	66	−6
T3	(United States) Jack Nicklaus	67	−5
T3	(United States) Larry Ziegler	67	−5
5	(United States) Lou Graham	68	−4
T6	(United States) Bud Allin	69	−3
T6	(United States) Dave Hill	69	−3
T8	(United States) Ben Crenshaw	70	−2
T8	(United States) Rod Curl	70	−2
T8	(United States) Rik Massengale	70	−2

=== Second round ===
Friday, April 9, 1976

Place	Player	Score	To par
1	(United States) Raymond Floyd	65-66=131	−13
2	(United States) Jack Nicklaus	67-69=136	−8
3	(United States) Hubert Green	71-66=137	−7
4	(United States) Larry Ziegler	67-71=138	−6
T5	(United States) Ben Crenshaw	70-70=140	−4
T5	(United States) Tom Kite	73-67=140	−4
T7	(United States) Charles Coody	72-69=141	−3
T7	(United States) Lou Graham	68-73=141	−3
T7	(Australia) Graham Marsh	73-68=141	−3
T10	(United States) Dave Hill	69-73=142	−2
T10	(United States) Rik Massengale	70-72=142	−2
T10	(United States) Eddie Pearce	71-71=142	−2

=== Third round ===
Saturday, April 10, 1976

Place	Player	Score	To par
1	(United States) Raymond Floyd	65-66-70=201	−15
2	(United States) Jack Nicklaus	67-69-73=209	−7
3	(United States) Larry Ziegler	67-71-72=210	−6
4	(United States) Charles Coody	72-69-70=211	−5
T5	(United States) Ben Crenshaw	70-70-72=212	−4
T5	(United States) Tom Kite	73-67-72=212	−4
7	(United States) Lou Graham	68-73-72=213	−3
8	(United States) Tom Weiskopf	73-71-70=214	−2
T9	(United States) Hubert Green	71-66-78=215	−1
T9	(United States) Hale Irwin	71-77-67=215	−1

=== Final round ===
Sunday, April 11, 1976

==== Final leaderboard ====
Champion
Silver Cup winner (low amateur)
(a) = amateur
(c) = past champion

Top 10
Place	Player	Score	To par	Money (US$)
1	(United States) Raymond Floyd	65-66-70-70=271	−17	40,000
2	(United States) Ben Crenshaw	70-70-72-67=279	−9	25,000
T3	(United States) Jack Nicklaus (c)	67-69-73-73=282	−6	16,250
T3	(United States) Larry Ziegler	67-71-72-72=282	−6	16,250
T5	(United States) Charles Coody (c)	72-69-70-74=285	−3	11,167
T5	(United States) Hale Irwin	71-77-67-70=285	−3	11,167
T5	(United States) Tom Kite	73-67-72-73=285	−3	11,167
8	(United States) Billy Casper (c)	71-76-71-69=287	−1	8,000
T9	(United States) Roger Maltbie	72-75-70-71=288	E	6,000
T9	(Australia) Graham Marsh	73-68-75-72=288	E	6,000
T9	(United States) Tom Weiskopf	73-71-70-74=288	E	6,000

Leaderboard below the top 10
Place	Player	Score	To par	Money ($)
T12	(United States) Jim Colbert	71-72-74-72=289	+1	3,567
T12	(United States) Lou Graham	68-73-72-76=289	+1	3,567
T12	(United States) Gene Littler	71-72-74-72=289	+1	3,567
T15	(United States) Al Geiberger	75-70-73-73=291	+3	2,950
T15	(United States) Dave Hill	69-73-76-73=291	+3	2,950
T15	(United States) Jerry McGee	71-73-72-75=291	+3	2,950
T15	(United States) Curtis Strange (a)	71-76-73-71=291	+3	0
T19	(United States) Buddy Allin	69-76-72-75=292	+4	2,550
T19	(Australia) Bruce Devlin	77-69-72-74=292	+4	2,550
T19	(United States) Hubert Green	71-66-78-77=292	+4	2,550
T19	(South Africa) Dale Hayes	75-74-73-70=292	+4	2,550
T23	(United States) Gay Brewer (c)	75-74-71-73=293	+5	2,225
T23	(United States) Rik Massengale	70-72-78-73=293	+5	2,225
T23	(United States) Johnny Miller	71-73-74-75=293	+5	2,225
T23	(England) Peter Oosterhuis	76-74-75-68=293	+5	2,225
27	(Australia) Bruce Crampton	74-76-71-73=294	+6	2,000
T28	(United States) Bob Murphy	72-74-76-73=295	+7	1,950
T28	(United States) Eddie Pearce	71-71-79-74=295	+7	1,950
T28	(South Africa) Gary Player (c)	73-73-70-79=295	+7	1,950
T28	(United States) Lee Trevino	75-75-69-76=295	+7	1,950
T28	(United States) Art Wall Jr. (c)	74-71-75-75=295	+7	1,950
T33	(United States) Don January	73-74-76-73=296	+8	1,900
T33	(Japan) Masashi Ozaki	72-75-75-74=296	+8	1,900
T33	(United States) Tom Watson	77-73-76-70=296	+8	1,900
36	(United States) Joe Inman	74-75-71-77=297	+9	1,850
T37	(Japan) Takashi Murakami	74-71-80-73=298	+10	1,800
T37	(United States) Andy North	66-81-75-76=298	+10	1,800
T39	(United States) Bob Gilder	71-75-76-77=299	+11	1,750
T39	(United States) John Mahaffey	72-74-78-75=299	+11	1,750
T39	(Australia) Bob Shearer	73-75-76-75=299	+11	1,750
42	(United States) Tommy Aaron (c)	73-76-77-74=300	+12	1,700
T43	(United States) Frank Beard	74-75-78-74=301	+13	1,650
T43	(United States) J. C. Snead	72-77-76-76=301	+13	1,650
45	(United States) Pat Fitzsimons	71-79-77-76=303	+15	1,600
46	(United States) Dick Siderowf (a)	76-73-77-81=307	+19	0
47	(South Africa) Bobby Cole	75-74-78-82=309	+21	1,500
CUT	(United States) Bob Goalby (c)	76-75=151	+7	
CUT	(United States) Sam Snead (c)	72-79=151	+7	
CUT	(United States) Rod Curl	70-82=152	+8	
CUT	(United States) George Archer (c)	74-79=153	+9	
CUT	(United States) Don Bies	76-77=153	+9	
CUT	(United States) Keith Fergus (a)	76-77=153	+9	
CUT	(United States) Jay Haas (a)	76-77=153	+9	
CUT	(United States) Don Iverson	73-80=153	+9	
CUT	(United States) Jim Wiechers	74-79=153	+9	
CUT	(South Africa) Hugh Baiocchi	78-76=154	+10	
CUT	(United States) Doug Ford (c)	74-80=154	+10	
CUT	(United States) John Grace (a)	75-79=154	+10	
CUT	(United States) Tom Jenkins	75-79=154	+10	
CUT	(United States) Henri DeLozier (a)	75-80=155	+11	
CUT	(Brazil) Priscillo Diniz (a)	78-77=155	+11	
CUT	(United States) Bobby Nichols	78-77=155	+11	
CUT	(United States) Arnold Palmer (c)	74-81=155	+11	
CUT	(United States) Allen Miller	79-77=156	+12	
CUT	(United States) Dean Refram	77-79=156	+12	
CUT	(United States) William C. Campbell (a)	78-80=158	+14	
CUT	(United States) Fred Ridley (a)	77-81=158	+14	
CUT	(United States) Ralph Johnston	76-83=159	+15	
CUT	(Australia) Jack Newton	76-83=159	+15	
CUT	(England) Maurice Bembridge	78-86=164	+20	
CUT	(United States) Vinny Giles (a)	83-81=164	+20	

==== Scorecard ====
Hole	1	2	3	4	5	6	7	8	9	10	11	12	13	14	15	16	17	18
Par	4	5	4	3	4	3	4	5	4	4	4	3	5	4	5	3	4	4
(United States) Floyd	−15	−15	−15	−14	−15	−15	−15	−15	−15	−15	−15	−16	−16	−16	−17	−17	−17	−17
(United States) Crenshaw	−3	−3	−4	−4	−4	−4	−5	−6	−6	−6	−6	−6	−8	−9	−9	−9	−9	−9
(United States) Nicklaus	−7	−7	−6	−6	−6	−6	−6	−7	−6	−6	−6	−6	−7	−7	−7	−6	−6	−6
(United States) Ziegler	−6	−6	−6	−6	−7	−7	−7	−7	−7	−7	−6	−6	−7	−7	−7	−7	−6	−6

Cumulative tournament scores, relative to par

Eagle	Birdie	Bogey
