= 1984 U.S. Open =

1984 U.S. Open may refer to:

- 1984 U.S. Open (golf), a major golf tournament
- 1984 US Open (tennis), a Grand Slam tennis tournament
