= 1975 Masters =

1975 Masters may refer to:

- 1975 Masters Tournament, golf
- 1975 Masters (snooker)
- 1975 Commercial Union Assurance Masters, tennis
