= 1965 PGA Tour Qualifying School graduates =

This is a list of the 1965 PGA Tour Qualifying School graduates.

== Tournament summary ==
There were 49 players at the 1965 event. The school began on Monday October 25 and lasted 10 days in total. During the first three days, the players exclusively attended lectures. The topics included player conduct, the rules of golf, the relationship between golf and the law, and a number of other issues. Professional golfers like Chick Harbert, Jack Burke Jr., and Dave Marr provided the lectures.

On Thursday October 28, the golf tournament proper began. It was played at PGA National Golf Club in Palm Beach Gardens, Florida over 144 holes and lasted one week. Seventeen players graduated.

According to Billy Booe, PGA Tournament Administrator, "it was not an impressive group" of graduates. As of May 1966, only 4 of the 17 of them had made any money on tour and only two of them had been in the money multiple times.

== List of graduates ==
Place	Player	Notes
1	(United States) John Schlee	
2	(United States) John Josephson	
3	(United States) Richard Canon	
4	(United States) Ron Gillespie	
T5	(United States) Richard Killian	
T5	(Canada) Bob Rose	
7	(United States) Dave Marad	
T8	(United States) Randy Petri	
T8	(United States) Dave Philo	
T10	(United States) Jimmy Fetters	
T10	(United States) Laurie Hammer	
T12	(United States) Stanley Brion	
T12	(United States) Roy Siegel Jr.	
T12	(Canada) Frank Whibley	
T15	(United States) Jim Colbert	
T15	(United States) William Giese	
T15	(United States) James Langley	
