= U.S. Professional Match Play Championship =

Golf tournament formerly on the PGA Tour

Tournament information
- Location: Cary, North Carolina
- Established: 1971
- Course: MacGregor Downs Country Club
- Par: 71
- Tour: PGA Tour
- Format: Match play
- Prize fund: US$200,000
- Month played: August
- Final year: 1973

Tournament record score
- Aggregate: 71 DeWitt Weaver (1971)
- To par: −1 as above
- Score: 2 and 1 Jack Nicklaus (1972)

Final champion
- (United States) John Schroeder
- Location in United States Location in North Carolina

The U.S. Professional Match Play Championship was a PGA Tour event that was played in North Carolina in the early 1970s.

The event was first played as the Liggett & Myers Open Match Play Championship in 1971 at The Country Club of North Carolina in Pinehurst. The field of 64 players in 1971 consisted of the winners of tour events from the previous 12 months and the leaders from the 1971 money list. The tournament was played in medal match play. The purse in 1971 was $267,500 with $35,000 going to the winner.

For 1972, the tournament, now called the U.S. Professional Match Play Championship, was held in conjunction with the Liggett & Myers Open. Eight players were exempt into the field of 16 with the other eight players being the leaders after the first two rounds of the Liggett & Myers Open. The tournament was played on Saturday and Sunday, two rounds each day, concurrently with the final two rounds of the Liggett & Myers Open. The tournament was played at normal match play. The purse in 1972 was $150,000 with $40,000 going to the winner. Losers in the first round received $5,000, or more than the fourth-place finisher in the Liggett & Myers Open.

In 1973, the format and purse remained the same but the events shifted to MacGregor Downs Country Club in Cary, North Carolina.

== Winners ==
Year	Winner	Score	To par	Margin of victory	Runner-up	Ref.
U.S. Professional Match Play Championship
1973	(United States) John Schroeder	2 up			(United States) DeWitt Weaver	
1972	(United States) Jack Nicklaus	2 and 1			(United States) Frank Beard	
Liggett & Myers Open Match Play Championship
1971	(United States) DeWitt Weaver	71	−1	6 strokes	(United States) Phil Rodgers	
