= 1973 PGA Tour =

Golf tour season

1973 PGA Tour season
- Duration: January 3, 1973 – November 3, 1973
- Number of official events: 48
- Most wins: (United States) Jack Nicklaus (7)
- Money list: (United States) Jack Nicklaus
- PGA Player of the Year: (United States) Jack Nicklaus

The 1973 PGA Tour was the 58th season of the PGA Tour, the main professional golf tour in the United States. It was also the fifth season since separating from the PGA of America.

== Schedule ==
The following table lists official events during the 1973 season.

Date	Tournament	Location	Purse (US$)	Winner (Note: The number in parentheses after each winner's name is the number of PGA Tour events they had won up to and including that tournament. This information is only shown for PGA Tour members.)	Notes
Jan 7	Glen Campbell-Los Angeles Open	California	135,000	(United States) Rod Funseth (2)	
Jan 14	Phoenix Open	Arizona	150,000	(Australia) Bruce Crampton (10)	
Jan 21	Dean Martin Tucson Open	Arizona	150,000	(Australia) Bruce Crampton (11)	
Jan 28	Bing Crosby National Pro-Am	California	180,000	(United States) Jack Nicklaus (46)	Pro-Am
Feb 4	Hawaiian Open	Hawaii	200,000	(United States) John Schlee (1)	
Feb 11	Bob Hope Desert Classic	California	160,000	(United States) Arnold Palmer (62)	Pro-Am
Feb 18	Andy Williams-San Diego Open Invitational	California	170,000	(United States) Bob Dickson (2)	
Feb 25	Jackie Gleason Inverrary-National Airlines Classic	Florida	260,000	(United States) Lee Trevino (16)	
Mar 4	Florida Citrus Open	Florida	150,000	(United States) Buddy Allin (2)	
Mar 11	Doral-Eastern Open	Florida	150,000	(United States) Lee Trevino (17)	
Mar 18	Greater Jacksonville Open	Florida	130,000	(United States) Jim Colbert (3)	
Mar 25	Greater New Orleans Open	Louisiana	125,000	(United States) Jack Nicklaus (47)	
Apr 2	Greater Greensboro Open	North Carolina	210,000	(United States) Chi-Chi Rodríguez (7)	
Apr 8	Magnolia Classic	Mississippi	35,000	(United States) Dwight Nevil (n/a)	Second Tour (Note: Official money; unofficial win.)
Apr 9	Masters Tournament	Georgia	224,825	(United States) Tommy Aaron (3)	Major championship
Apr 15	Monsanto Open	Florida	150,000	(United States) Homero Blancas (4)	
Apr 22	Tournament of Champions	California	200,000	(United States) Jack Nicklaus (48)	Winners-only event
Apr 22	Tallahassee Open	Florida	75,000	(United States) Hubert Green (2)	Alternate event
Apr 29	Byron Nelson Golf Classic	Texas	150,000	(United States) Lanny Wadkins (2)	
May 6	Houston Open	Texas	205,000	(Australia) Bruce Crampton (12)	
May 13	Colonial National Invitation	Texas	150,000	(United States) Tom Weiskopf (6)	Invitational
May 20	Danny Thomas Memphis Classic	Tennessee	175,000	(United States) Dave Hill (10)	
May 27	Atlanta Classic	Georgia	150,000	(United States) Jack Nicklaus (49)	
Jun 3	Kemper Open	North Carolina	200,000	(United States) Tom Weiskopf (7)	
Jun 10	IVB-Philadelphia Golf Classic	Pennsylvania	150,000	(United States) Tom Weiskopf (8)	
Jun 17	U.S. Open	Pennsylvania	227,200	(United States) Johnny Miller (3)	Major championship
Jun 24	American Golf Classic	Ohio	160,000	(Australia) Bruce Crampton (13)	
Jul 1	Western Open	Illinois	175,000	(United States) Billy Casper (49)	
Jul 8	Greater Milwaukee Open	Wisconsin	130,000	(United States) Dave Stockton (6)	
Jul 14	The Open Championship	Scotland	£50,000	(United States) Tom Weiskopf (9)	Major championship (Note: Unofficial money event at the time, but retrospectively counted as an official win.)
Jul 15	Shrine-Robinson Open Golf Classic	Illinois	125,000	(United States) Deane Beman (4)	Alternate event
Jul 22	St. Louis Children's Hospital Golf Classic	Missouri	210,000	(United States) Gene Littler (25)	
Jul 29	Canadian Open	Canada	175,000	(United States) Tom Weiskopf (10)	
Aug 5	Westchester Classic	New York	250,000	(United States) Bobby Nichols (10)	
Aug 12	PGA Championship	Ohio	225,000	(United States) Jack Nicklaus (50)	Major championship
Aug 19	USI Classic	Massachusetts	200,000	(United States) Lanny Wadkins (3)	
Aug 26	U.S. Professional Match Play Championship	North Carolina	200,000	(United States) John Schroeder (1)	Limited-field event
Aug 26	Liggett & Myers Open	North Carolina	100,000	(United States) Bert Greene (1)	Alternate event
Sep 3	Sammy Davis Jr.-Greater Hartford Open	Connecticut	200,000	(United States) Billy Casper (50)	
Sep 9	Southern Open	Georgia	100,000	(South Africa) Gary Player (18)	
Sep 16	Sea Pines Heritage Classic	South Carolina	150,000	(United States) Hale Irwin (2)	Invitational
Sep 23	B.C. Open	New York	100,000	(United States) Hubert Green (3)	
Sep 30	Quad Cities Open	Iowa	100,000	(United States) Sam Adams (1)	
Oct 7	Ohio Kings Island Open	Ohio	125,000	(United States) Jack Nicklaus (51)	New tournament
Oct 21	Kaiser International Open Invitational	California	150,000	(United States) Ed Sneed (1)	
Oct 28	Sahara Invitational	Nevada	135,000	(United States) John Mahaffey (1)	
Nov 4	San Antonio Texas Open	Texas	125,000	(United States) Ben Crenshaw (1)	
Nov 17	World Open Golf Championship	North Carolina	50,000	(United States) Miller Barber (8)	New tournament
Dec 1	Walt Disney World Golf Classic	Florida	150,000	(United States) Jack Nicklaus (52)	

=== Unofficial events ===
The following events were sanctioned by the PGA Tour, but did not carry official money, nor were wins official.

Date	Tournament	Location	Purse ($)	Winner(s)	Notes
Jun 30	Lake Michigan Classic	Michigan	16,000	(Canada) Wilf Homenuik	
Sep 22	Ryder Cup	Scotland	n/a	Team USA	Team event
Nov 25	World Cup	Spain	4,200	(United States) Johnny Miller and (United States) Jack Nicklaus	Team event
Nov 25	World Cup Individual Trophy	Spain	2,100	(United States) Johnny Miller	

== Money list ==
The money list was based on prize money won during the season, calculated in U.S. dollars.

Position	Player	Prize money ($)
1	(United States) Jack Nicklaus	308,362
2	(Australia) Bruce Crampton	274,266
3	(United States) Tom Weiskopf	245,463
4	(United States) Lee Trevino	210,017
5	(United States) Lanny Wadkins	200,455
6	(United States) Miller Barber	184,014
7	(United States) Hale Irwin	130,388
8	(United States) Billy Casper	129,474
9	(United States) Johnny Miller	127,833
10	(United States) John Schlee	118,017

== Awards ==
Award	Winner	Ref.
PGA Player of the Year	(United States) Jack Nicklaus	
Scoring leader (Vardon Trophy)	(Australia) Bruce Crampton	
