= John Schlee =

American professional golfer (1939–2000)

Personal information
- Full name: John H. Schlee
- Nationality: United States
- Born: June 2, 1939 Kremmling, Colorado, U.S.
- Died: June 2, 2000 (aged 61) Costa Mesa, California, U.S.
- Height: 6 ft 3 in (1.91 m)
- Weight: 165 lb (75 kg; 11.8 st)

Career
- Sport: Golf
- College: Memphis State University
- Turned professional: 1964
- Former tours: PGA Tour; Champions Tour
- Professional wins: 1

Number of wins by tour
- PGA Tour: 1

Best results in major championships
- Masters Tournament: T8: 1977
- PGA Championship: T4: 1976
- U.S. Open: 2nd: 1973
- The Open Championship: WD: 1973

John H. Schlee (June 2, 1939 – June 2, 2000) was an American professional golfer who played on the PGA Tour in the 1960s and 1970s.

== Early life and amateur career ==
Schlee was born in Kremmling, Colorado and grew up in Seaside, Oregon, where he was known as Jack Schlee. He served two years in the U.S. Army starting in 1957. Schlee attended Memphis State University and was a member of the golf team.

== Professional career ==
In 1964, Schlee turned pro. He took club pro jobs after college, and in 1965 was medalist at the inaugural PGA Tour Qualifying School. He was the 1966 PGA Tour Rookie-of-the-Year making the cut in 13 events and finishing 48th on the money list.

Schlee played full-time on the PGA Tour from 1966 to 1977. He had more than 30 top-10 finishes in PGA Tour events. His career year was 1973 when he won the Hawaiian Open and finished one stroke behind Johnny Miller at the U.S. Open. Schlee had four top-10 finishes in major championships: the aforementioned solo 2nd at the 1973 U.S. Open, a T10 at the 1975 PGA Championship, a T4 at the 1976 PGA Championship, and a T8 at 1977 Masters Tournament.

Schlee was forced into part-time play on the PGA Tour in the mid-1970s due to a series of health problems starting with back surgery in 1975 and followed by knee surgery in 1976. Schlee took a club pro job in Rancho Viejo, Texas in June 1977 after his third serious ailment in as many years, a painful injury to his left thumb. His last appearance was at the Danny Thomas Memphis Classic in 1978.

In 1980, Schlee began a teaching pro career at Industry Hills Golf Resort, east of Los Angeles, California. He also invented devices to help students of the game learn. In 1986, Schlee wrote a book, Maximum Golf, which was a collection of his instructional theories and a tribute to his mentor, Ben Hogan.

After reaching the age of 50 in 1989, Schlee played in a few dozen Senior PGA Tour events but never came close to winning an event. His best finish in this venue was a T-42. Schlee lived in Texas during most of his regular career years and in California during his senior career years.

== Personal life ==
Schlee died in a Costa Mesa, California hospital in 2000 of complications from Alzheimer's disease.

== Awards and honors ==
Schlee was named the 1966 PGA Tour Rookie of the Year by Golf Digest.

== Professional wins (1) ==
=== PGA Tour wins (1) ===
No.	Date	Tournament	Winning score	Margin of victory	Runner-up
1	Feb 4, 1973	Hawaiian Open	−15 (70-68-67-68=273)	2 strokes	(United States) Orville Moody

PGA Tour playoff record (0–1)

No.	Year	Tournament	Opponent	Result
1	1973	Kaiser International Open Invitational	(United States) Ed Sneed	Lost to par on first extra hole

== Results in major championships ==
Tournament	1967	1968	1969	1970	1971	1972	1973	1974	1975	1976	1977	1978
Masters Tournament					T36		57	T26			T8	T42
U.S. Open	CUT	CUT	T52		T42		2	CUT	T38		CUT	
The Open Championship							WD					
PGA Championship					T40	T40	T60	T17	T10	T4	T36	

Top 10
Did not play

CUT = missed the half-way cut
WD = withdrew
"T" indicates a tie for a place

=== Summary ===
Tournament	Wins	2nd	3rd	Top-5	Top-10	Top-25	Events	Cuts made
Masters Tournament	0	0	0	0	1	1	5	5
U.S. Open	0	1	0	1	1	1	8	4
The Open Championship	0	0	0	0	0	0	1	0
PGA Championship	0	0	0	1	2	3	7	7
Totals	0	1	0	2	4	5	21	16

- Most consecutive cuts made – 7 (1969 U.S. Open – 1973 U.S. Open)
- Longest streak of top-10s – 2 (1976 PGA – 1977 Masters)

== See also ==
- 1965 PGA Tour Qualifying School graduates
