= Bert Greene (golfer) =

American professional golfer (born 1944)

Personal information
- Full name: Charles Greene
- Nationality: United States
- Born: February 11, 1944 (age 82) Gray, Georgia, U.S.
- Height: 6 ft 0 in (1.83 m)
- Weight: 170 lb (77 kg; 12 st)

Career
- Sport: Golf
- College: University of Tennessee
- Turned professional: 1966
- Former tour: PGA Tour
- Professional wins: 5

Number of wins by tour
- PGA Tour: 1
- Other: 4

Best results in major championships
- Masters Tournament: 12th/T12: 1970, 1971
- PGA Championship: 3rd: 1969
- U.S. Open: T42: 1969
- The Open Championship: DNP

Charles "Bert" Greene (born February 11, 1944) is an American professional golfer who played on the PGA Tour.

== Early life and amateur career ==
In 1944, Greene was born in Gray, Georgia.

Greene attended the University of Tennessee where he was a member of the golf team. He won the 1964 SEC Championship and was a third-team All-American in 1964 and 1965.

== Professional career ==
In 1966, Greene turned professional. He had success at 1966 PGA Tour Qualifying School to make it onto the PGA Tour. Greene played on the PGA Tour from 1967 to 1975. He won one tour event, the 1973 Liggett Myers Open at MacGregor Downs Country Club in Cary, North Carolina, in a playoff with Miller Barber.

In 1969, Greene also finished runner-up at two tournaments: the Westchester Classic, one stroke behind Frank Beard, and the Tallahassee Open Invitational, one stroke behind Chuck Courtney. His best finish in a major was a third-place finish at the 1969 PGA Championship.

At a golf tournament in 1972, Greene was shot in the foot when a gun in his golf bag accidentally discharged.

== Awards and honors ==
- In 1964 and 1965, while at the University of Tennessee, Greene earned All-American honors.

== Amateur wins ==
- 1963 Tennessee State Amateur
- 1964 SEC Championship

== Professional wins (5) ==
=== PGA Tour wins (1) ===
No.	Date	Tournament	Winning score	Margin of victory	Runner-up
1	Feb 4, 1973	Liggett & Myers Open	−6 (68-73-67-70=278)	Playoff	(United States) Miller Barber

PGA Tour playoff record (1–0)

No.	Year	Tournament	Opponent	Result
1	1973	Liggett & Myers Open	(United States) Miller Barber	Won with birdie on fifth extra hole

=== Caribbean Tour wins (2) ===
- 1970 Los Lagartos Open
- 1971 Los Lagartos Open

=== South American wins (2) ===
- 1970 Brazil Open
- 1971 Colombian Open

== Results in major championships ==
Tournament	1965	1966	1967	1968	1969	1970	1971	1972	1973	1974
Masters Tournament		CUT				T12	12	T31		CUT
U.S. Open	CUT			CUT	T42	T54				
PGA Championship					3	T48	T71			T73

Note: Greene never played in The Open Championship.

Top 10
Did not play

CUT = missed the half-way cut
"T" indicates a tie for a place

== See also ==
- 1966 PGA Tour Qualifying School graduates
