= 1979 Masters Tournament =

- Front cover of the 1979 Masters Guide

Tournament information
- Dates: April 12–15, 1979
- Location: Augusta, Georgia; 33.503°N 82.020°W
- Course: Augusta National Golf Club
- Organized by: Augusta National Golf Club
- Tour: PGA Tour

Statistics
- Par: 72
- Length: 7,040 yards (6,437 m)
- Field: 72 players, 45 after cut
- Cut: 145 (+1)
- Winner's share: $50,000

Champion
- (United States) Fuzzy Zoeller
- 280 (−8), playoff

Location map
- Location in the United States Location in Georgia

The 1979 Masters Tournament was the 43rd Masters Tournament, held April 12–15 at Augusta National Golf Club in Augusta, Georgia.

Fuzzy Zoeller won his only Masters, the first of his two major titles, with a birdie on the second hole of a playoff with Ed Sneed and Tom Watson. Jack Nicklaus climbed up the leaderboard on Sunday with a 69 (−3), but bogeyed 17 to finish a stroke out of the playoff; Tom Kite had a double bogey at 16 for an even par 72 in the final round to finish fifth, three strokes back.

Second and third round leader Sneed seemed to have a commanding three-shot lead with only three holes to go, but bogeyed the final three holes to card a final round 76 (+4) and fell into the playoff. It was the debut of the sudden-death format at Augusta, adopted by the Masters in 1976. Its last playoff was nine years earlier in 1970, then a full 18-hole round on Monday.

The sudden-death playoff began on the tenth hole, a downhill par-4, where all three players missed birdie putts and parred. On the second hole, the par-4 11th, Sneed failed to hole a bunker shot and Watson a birdie putt, and then Zoeller made his from 6 feet (2 m) to win.

Zoeller, age 27, was the first to win the Masters in his initial attempt since Gene Sarazen in 1935, the second edition of the tournament. In his fifth season on tour, it was Zoeller's second win, the first came less than three months earlier at the Andy Williams-San Diego Open Invitational. He won his other major five years later at the 1984 U.S. Open, also in a playoff.

The second round was suspended for two hours Friday afternoon due to heavy rain and tornado warnings. Due to the delay, not all golfers were able to complete their second rounds on Friday and the cut line was not determined until these rounds were completed on Saturday morning. Normally scheduled to conclude on the second Sunday of April, this Masters was held a week later, as was 1984.

== Field ==
1. Masters champions

Tommy Aaron, Gay Brewer, Billy Casper, Charles Coody, Raymond Floyd (8,9,11,12), Doug Ford, Bob Goalby, Jack Nicklaus (3,4,8,9,11,12), Arnold Palmer, Gary Player (3,8,9,11), Sam Snead, Art Wall Jr., Tom Watson (3,8,9,10,11,12)

- George Archer, Jack Burke Jr., Jimmy Demaret, Ralph Guldahl, Claude Harmon, Ben Hogan, Herman Keiser, Cary Middlecoff, Byron Nelson, Henry Picard, and Gene Sarazen did not play.

The following categories only apply to Americans

2. U.S. Open champions (last five years)

Lou Graham (12), Hubert Green (8,11,12), Hale Irwin (8,9,12), Andy North (9), Jerry Pate (8,9,10,11)

3. The Open champions (last five years)

Johnny Miller (9)

4. PGA champions (last five years)

Dave Stockton (9,12), Lee Trevino (8,9,10,11), Lanny Wadkins (8,11,12)

- John Mahaffey (10,11) withdrew because of injury.

5. 1978 U.S. Amateur semi-finalists

Bobby Clampett (7,a), John Cook (6,7,a), Scott Hoch (7,a), Mike Peck (a)

6. Previous two U.S. Amateur and Amateur champions

- John Fought forfeited his exemption by turning professional.

7. Members of the 1978 U.S. Eisenhower Trophy team

Jay Sigel (a)

8. Top 24 players and ties from the 1978 Masters Tournament

Wally Armstrong, Miller Barber, Andy Bean (9,10,11), Rod Funseth (11), Joe Inman (9), Don January (12), Tom Kite (11), Billy Kratzert (9), Gene Littler, Jerry McGee (12), Lindy Miller, Gil Morgan (10,11), Ed Sneed (12), Leonard Thompson, Tom Weiskopf (9,10)

9. Top 16 players and ties from the 1978 U.S. Open

Mike McCullough, Artie McNickle, J. C. Snead

10. Top eight players and ties from 1978 PGA Championship

Craig Stadler

11. Winners of PGA Tour events since the previous Masters

Bob Byman, Ben Crenshaw, Lee Elder, Jerry Heard, Lon Hinkle, Barry Jaeckel, Bruce Lietzke, Mark McCumber, Mac McLendon, Larry Nelson, Jim Simons, Ron Streck, Fuzzy Zoeller

12. Members of the U.S. 1977 Ryder Cup team

Dave Hill

13. Foreign invitations

Isao Aoki, Seve Ballesteros (8,9), Nick Faldo, David Graham (8), Graham Marsh (10), Peter McEvoy (6,a), Jack Newton (11), Peter Oosterhuis (8), Simon Owen, Masashi Ozaki, Victor Regalado (11), Bob Shearer (9)

- Numbers in brackets indicate categories that the player would have qualified under had they been American.

== Round summaries ==
=== First round ===
Thursday, April 12, 1979

Place	Player	Score	To par
1	(United States) Bruce Lietzke	67	−5
T2	(United States) Tom Watson	68	−4
T2	(United States) Joe Inman	68	−4
T2	(United States) Leonard Thompson	68	−4
T2	(United States) Ed Sneed	68	−4
T6	(United States) Craig Stadler	69	−3
T6	(United States) Jack Nicklaus	69	−3
T6	(United States) Lou Graham	69	−3
T6	(United States) Billy Casper	69	−3
T6	(United States) Andy Bean	69	−3

=== Second round ===
Friday, April 13, 1979
Saturday, April 14, 1979

Place	Player	Score	To par
T1	(United States) Ed Sneed	68-67=135	−9
T1	(United States) Craig Stadler	69-66=135	−9
T3	(United States) Raymond Floyd	70-68=138	−6
T3	(United States) Leonard Thompson	68-70=138	−6
T5	(United States) Miller Barber	75-64=139	−5
T5	(United States) Tom Watson	68-71=139	−5
T5	(United States) Joe Inman	68-71=139	−5
T8	(Spain) Seve Ballesteros	72-68=140	−4
T8	(United States) Jack Nicklaus	69-71=140	−4
T8	(United States) Lou Graham	69-71=140	−4
T8	(United States) Lindy Miller	73-67=140	−4

=== Third round ===
Saturday, April 14, 1979

Place	Player	Score	To par
1	(United States) Ed Sneed	68-67-69=204	−12
T2	(United States) Tom Watson	68-71-70=209	−7
T2	(United States) Craig Stadler	69-66-74=209	−7
T4	(United States) Bruce Lietzke	67-75-68=210	−6
T4	(United States) Fuzzy Zoeller	70-71-69=210	−6
T6	(United States) Tom Kite	71-72-68=211	−5
T6	(Australia) Jack Newton	70-72-69=211	−5
T6	(United States) Miller Barber	75-64-72=211	−5
T6	(United States) Raymond Floyd	70-68-73=211	−5
T6	(United States) Leonard Thompson	68-70-73=211	−5

=== Final round ===
Sunday, April 15, 1979

==== Final leaderboard ====
Champion
Silver Cup winner (low amateur)
(a) = amateur
(c) = past champion

Top 10
Place	Player	Score	To par	Money (US$)
T1	(United States) Ed Sneed	68-67-69-76=280	−8	Playoff
T1	(United States) Tom Watson (c)	68-71-70-71=280	−8	Playoff
T1	(United States) Fuzzy Zoeller	70-71-69-70=280	−8	Playoff
4	(United States) Jack Nicklaus (c)	69-71-72-69=281	−7	15,000
5	(United States) Tom Kite	71-72-68-72=283	−5	13,000
6	(United States) Bruce Lietzke	67-75-68-74=284	−4	11,500
T7	(United States) Craig Stadler	69-66-74-76=285	−3	9,000
T7	(United States) Leonard Thompson	68-70-73-74=285	−3	9,000
T7	(United States) Lanny Wadkins	73-69-70-73=285	−3	9,000
T10	(United States) Hubert Green	74-69-72-71=286	−2	6,500
T10	(United States) Gene Littler	74-71-69-72=286	−2	6,500

Leaderboard below the top 10
Place	Player	Score	To par	Money ($)
T12	(Spain) Seve Ballesteros	72-68-73-74=287	−1	3,740
T12	(United States) Miller Barber	75-64-72-76=287	−1	3,740
T12	(Australia) Jack Newton	70-72-69-76=287	−1	3,740
T12	(United States) Andy North	72-72-74-69=287	−1	3,740
T12	(United States) Lee Trevino	73-71-70-73=287	−1	3,740
T17	(United States) Lee Elder	73-70-74-71=288	E	2,700
T17	(United States) Raymond Floyd (c)	70-68-73-77=288	E	2,700
T17	(United States) Billy Kratzert	73-68-71-76=288	E	2,700
T17	(United States) Artie McNickle	71-72-74-71=288	E	2,700
T17	(South Africa) Gary Player (c)	71-72-74-71=288	E	2,700
22	(United States) J. C. Snead	73-71-72-73=289	+1	2,400
T23	(United States) Bobby Clampett (a)	73-71-73-73=290	+2	0
T23	(United States) Lou Graham	69-71-76-74=290	+2	2,225
T23	(United States) Joe Inman	68-71-76-75=290	+2	2,225
T23	(United States) Hale Irwin	72-70-74-74=290	+2	2,225
T23	(United States) Jim Simons	72-70-75-73=290	+2	2,225
T28	(United States) Tommy Aaron (c)	72-73-76-70=291	+3	2,000
T28	(United States) Andy Bean	69-74-74-74=291	+3	2,000
T28	(Australia) Graham Marsh	71-72-73-75=291	+3	2,000
T31	(United States) Gil Morgan	72-69-71-80=292	+4	1,975
T31	(United States) Larry Nelson	70-75-70-77=292	+4	1,975
T31	(Mexico) Victor Regalado	71-74-75-72=292	+4	1,975
T34	(Japan) Isao Aoki	71-72-72-78=293	+5	1,950
T34	(United States) Bob Byman	71-71-75-76=293	+5	1,950
T34	(United States) Charles Coody (c)	71-72-74-76=293	+5	1,950
T34	(United States) Scott Hoch (a)	72-73-74-74=293	+5	0
T34	(England) Peter Oosterhuis	73-72-73-75=293	+5	1,950
39	(United States) John Cook (a)	72-72-75-76=295	+7	0
40	(England) Nick Faldo	73-71-79-73=296	+8	1,875
T41	(United States) Jerry Pate	72-70-75-80=297	+9	1,850
T41	(United States) Tom Weiskopf	73-72-71-81=297	+9	1,850
43	(United States) Billy Casper (c)	69-75-80-75=299	+11	1,800
44	(United States) Rod Funseth	70-73-78-79=300	+12	1,775
45	(United States) Lindy Miller	73-67-75-86=301	+13	1,750
CUT	(United States) Barry Jaeckel	75-71=146	+2	
CUT	(United States) Don January	73-73=146	+2	
CUT	(United States) Jerry McGee	77-69=146	+2	
CUT	(United States) Arnold Palmer (c)	74-72=146	+2	
CUT	(United States) Wally Armstrong	73-74=147	+3	
CUT	(United States) Jay Sigel (a)	72-75=147	+3	
CUT	(United States) Jerry Heard	75-73=148	+4	
CUT	(United States) Johnny Miller	77-71=148	+4	
CUT	(United States) Sam Snead (c)	74-74=148	+4	
CUT	(United States) Dave Hill	75-74=149	+5	
CUT	(United States) Lon Hinkle	77-72=149	+5	
CUT	(New Zealand) Simon Owen	74-75=149	+5	
CUT	(United States) Dave Stockton	74-75=149	+5	
CUT	(United States) Art Wall Jr. (c)	74-75=149	+5	
CUT	(United States) Gay Brewer (c)	75-75=150	+6	
CUT	(United States) Mike McCullough	73-77=150	+6	
CUT	(United States) Mac McLendon	74-77=151	+7	
CUT	(Japan) Masashi Ozaki	76-75=151	+7	
CUT	(United States) Ben Crenshaw	73-80=153	+9	
CUT	(United States) Mark McCumber	75-78=153	+9	
CUT	(United States) Mike Peck (a)	78-75=153	+9	
CUT	(United States) Ron Streck	78-76=154	+10	
CUT	(England) Peter McEvoy (a)	79-79=158	+14	
CUT	(United States) Bob Goalby (c)	79-81=160	+16	
WD	(Australia) Bob Shearer	73	+1	
WD	(United States) Doug Ford (c)	77	+5	
WD	(Australia) David Graham	79	+7	

==== Scorecard ====
Hole	1	2	3	4	5	6	7	8	9	10	11	12	13	14	15	16	17	18
Par	4	5	4	3	4	3	4	5	4	4	4	3	5	4	5	3	4	4
(United States) Zoeller	−6	−6	−6	−5	−5	−5	−5	−6	−6	−6	−6	−5	−6	−6	−7	−7	−8	−8
(United States) Sneed	−12	−12	−12	−11	−11	−10	−10	−10	−10	−9	−9	−9	−10	−10	−11	−10	−9	−8
(United States) Watson	−7	−8	−9	−8	−8	−8	−8	−8	−8	−8	−8	−8	−8	−7	−8	−8	−8	−8
(United States) Nicklaus	−4	−5	−5	−4	−4	−4	−4	−5	−5	−6	−6	−6	−7	−7	−7	−8	−7	−7
(United States) Kite	−5	−5	−5	−6	−6	−6	−6	−6	−6	−6	−6	−6	−7	−7	−7	−5	−5	−5
(United States) Lietzke	−6	−6	−6	−6	−5	−5	−5	−5	−5	−5	−4	−4	−3	−3	−3	−3	−4	−4
(United States) Stadler	−6	−7	−8	−8	−8	−8	−7	−7	−6	−4	−3	−2	−4	−2	−2	−2	−3	−3
(United States) Thompson	−4	−4	−4	−3	−3	−3	−3	−4	−4	−4	−4	−3	−4	−3	−3	−3	−3	−3
(United States) Wadkins	−2	−2	−2	−2	−2	−2	−2	−2	−1	−2	−2	−1	E	−1	−2	−3	−3	−3

Cumulative tournament scores, relative to par

=== Playoff ===
Place	Player	Score	To par	Money ($)
1	(United States) Fuzzy Zoeller	4-3	−1	50,000
T2	(United States) Ed Sneed	4-x		30,000
T2	(United States) Tom Watson	4-4		30,000

- Sudden-death playoff began on hole #10 and ended at hole #11, when Zoeller birdied.
