= Fuzzy Zoeller =

American professional golfer (1951–2025)

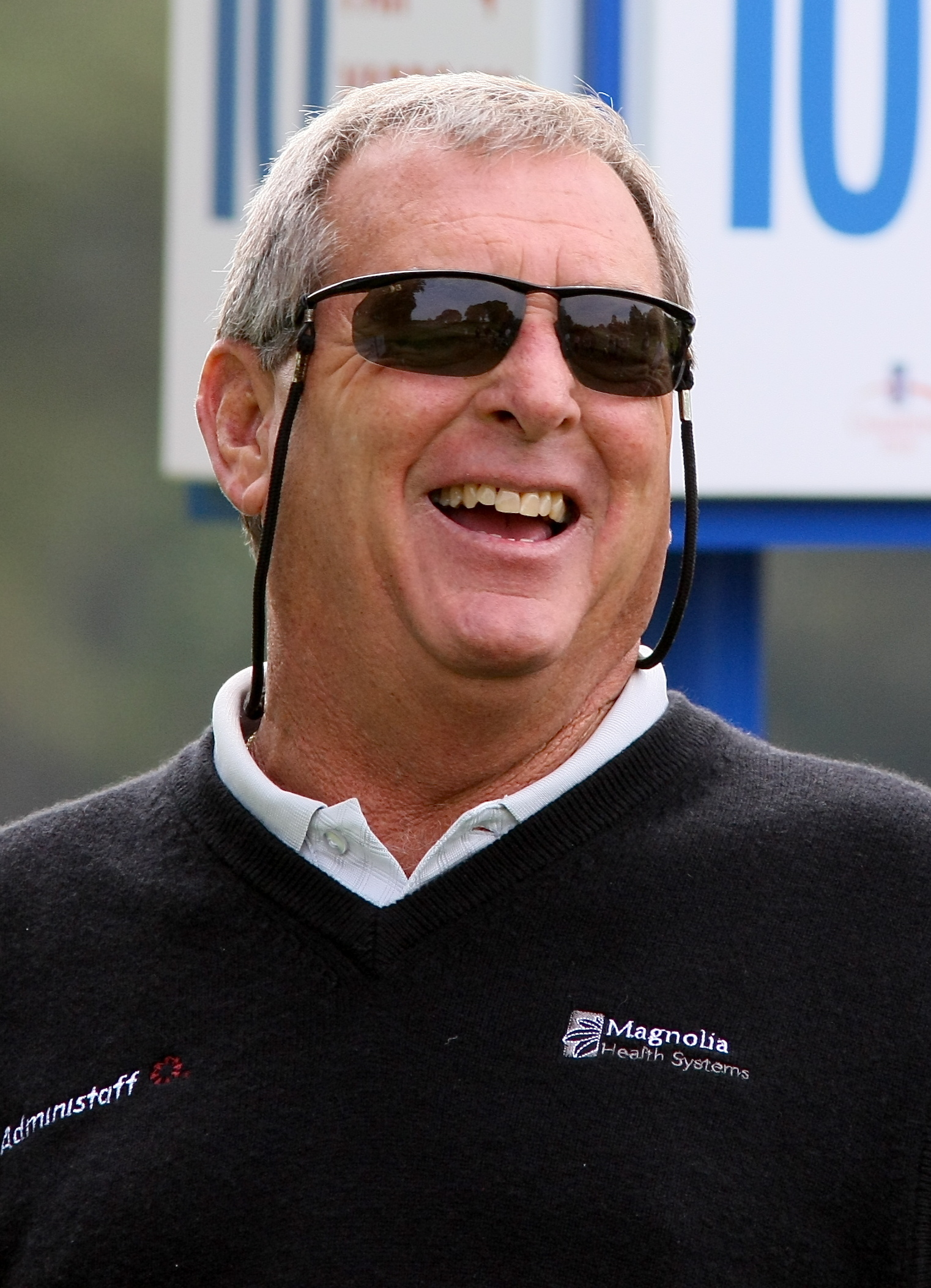
- Zoeller in 2008

Personal information
- Full name: Frank Urban Zoeller Jr.
- Nickname: Fuzzy
- Nationality: United States
- Born: November 11, 1951 New Albany, Indiana, U.S.
- Died: November 27, 2025 (aged 74)
- Height: 5 ft 10 in (1.78 m)
- Weight: 190 lb (86 kg; 14 st)
- Spouse: Diane Thornton Zoeller
- Children: 4

Career
- Sport: Golf
- College: Edison College (FL); University of Houston
- Turned professional: 1973
- Former tours: PGA Tour; Champions Tour
- Professional wins: 19

Number of wins by tour
- PGA Tour: 10
- PGA Tour Champions: 2
- Other: 7

Best results in major championships (wins: 2)
- Masters Tournament: Won: 1979
- PGA Championship: 2nd: 1981
- U.S. Open: Won: 1984
- The Open Championship: 3rd: 1994

Achievements and awards
- Bob Jones Award: 1985

Frank Urban "Fuzzy" Zoeller Jr. (/ˈzɛlər/; November 11, 1951 – November 27, 2025) was an American professional golfer who won 10 PGA Tour events including two major championships. He won the 1979 Masters Tournament, becoming the third golfer to win in his first appearance in the event. He also won the 1984 U.S. Open.

== Early life and amateur career ==
Zoeller was born and raised in New Albany, Indiana. While attending New Albany High School, he was a star golfer, finishing as the runner-up in the 1970 state high school tournament with a state record low round (67).

After graduating high school, he attended Edison Junior College in Florida, transferred to the University of Houston in Texas, and became a professional golfer in 1973.

== Professional golfing career ==
Zoeller became a professional golfer in 1973.

In 1979, Zoeller became the first golfer since 1935 (Note: The only two other golfers to have won The Masters on their debut at Augusta were the winners of the first two Masters tournaments Horton Smith and Gene Sarazen, in 1934 and 1935 respectively.) to win The Masters in his first appearance in the event. Zoeller won both of his two major tournaments in playoffs: the Masters in 1979 at Augusta National Golf Club in a three-way sudden-death playoff with Ed Sneed and Tom Watson; and the 1984 U.S. Open at Winged Foot Golf Club after an 18-hole playoff with Greg Norman. It was the first sudden-death playoff at The Masters.

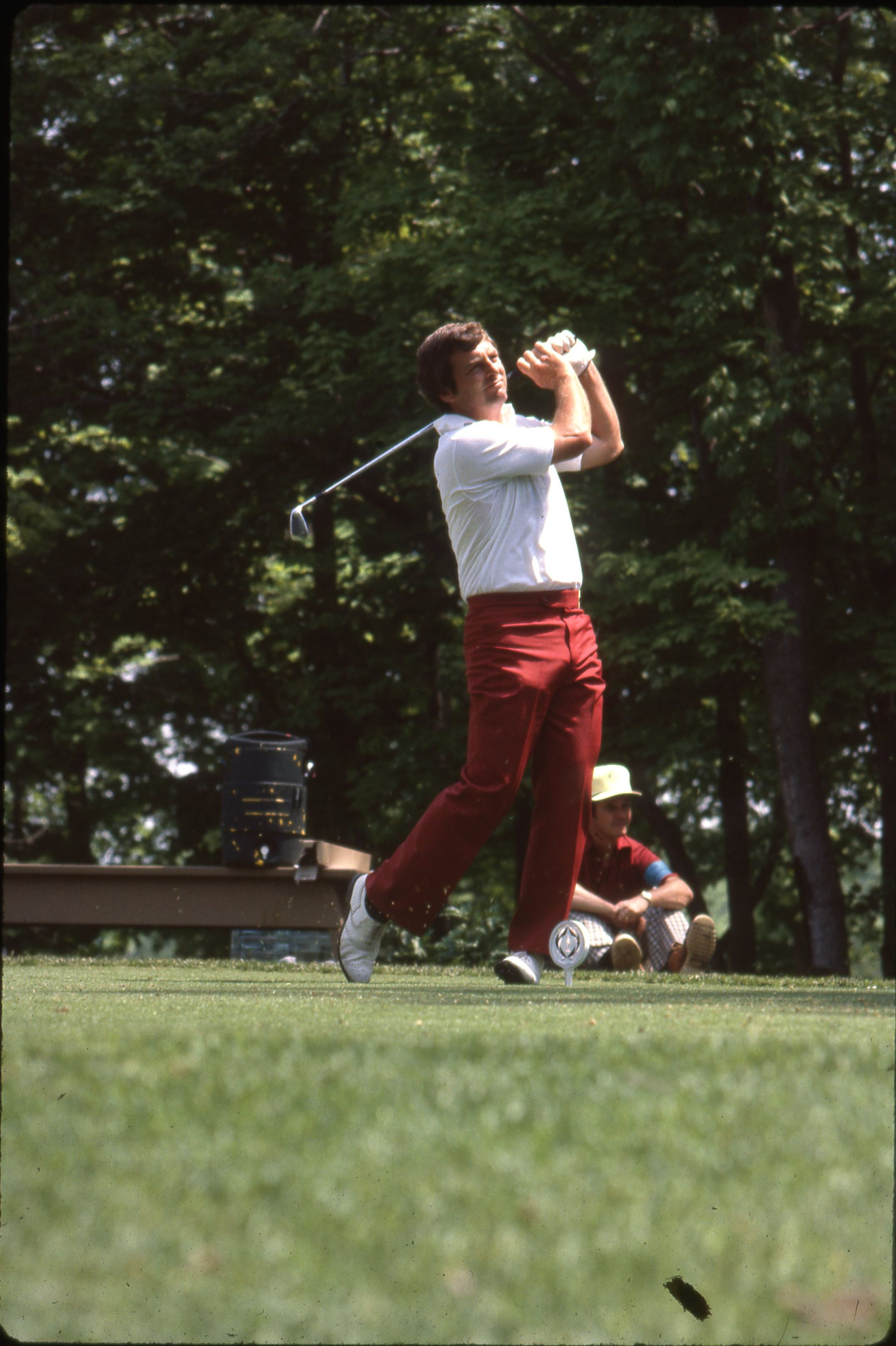
Fuzzy Zoeller after hitting a shot off a tee during the first round of the 1980 Memorial Tournament at the Muirfield Village Golf Club

For much of his career, Zoeller was famous for waving a white towel in mock surrender from the fairway of the 72nd hole of the 1984 U.S. Open, after Greg Norman holed a long putt on the 72nd green to tie Zoeller for the tournament lead. At the end of the 18-hole playoff the next day between Norman and Zoeller (which Zoeller won by 8 strokes), Norman waved a white towel himself, returning the joke.

Zoeller was voted the 1985 winner of the Bob Jones Award, the highest honor given by the United States Golf Association in recognition of distinguished sportsmanship in golf. He shared the 54-hole lead in the 1994 Open Championship after a 3rd round of 64, but finished the tournament in 3rd place, his best-ever finish in The Open. Zoeller missed an 8-foot (2.4 m) birdie putt on the 18th green in his 3rd round at Turnberry which would have tied the record for the best single round at The Open.

He competed in the 1979, 1983, and 1985 Ryder Cups. In 2002, he joined the Champions Tour and won the Senior PGA Championship, a senior major, that year. He also won the 2004 MasterCard Championship.

== Other pursuits ==
In 2009, Zoeller began selling vodka under the brand name Fuzzy's Vodka. Starting in 2012, the brand sponsored Ed Carpenter Racing's entries in the IndyCar Series.

== Controversies and legal issues ==
In 1997, during the 1997 Masters Tournament, Zoeller was asked about Tiger Woods and responded, "Tell him not to serve fried chicken next year...or collard greens or whatever the hell they serve". The remarks were condemned as racist, and this incident haunted Zoeller for the rest of his life.

=== Defamation lawsuit ===
On February 13, 2007, Zoeller sued Josef Silny & Associates, a foreign-credential evaluation firm based in Miami, Florida. The lawsuit alleged that defamatory statements appeared in the Wikipedia article about Zoeller in December 2006, originating from a computer at that firm. According to the suit, the edits suggested Zoeller had committed acts including alcohol, drug, and domestic abuse. Defendant Josef Silny said a computer consultant would investigate. However, Zoeller dropped the lawsuit in December 2007 after being unsuccessful in finding the poster. Zoeller was unable to sue Wikipedia for the statements due to protections accorded to providers of "interactive computer services" under Section 230 of the Communications Decency Act.

== Personal life and death ==
Zoeller was married to Diane, who died in 2021. He had four children.

Zoeller died on November 27, 2025, at the age of 74.

== Awards and honors ==
In 1985, he was awarded the Bob Jones Award by the United States Golf Association.

== Amateur wins ==
- 1972 Florida State Junior College Championship (individual)
- 1973 Old Capital Invitational (Indiana)
- 1973 Indiana State Amateur

== Professional wins (19) ==
=== PGA Tour wins (10) ===
Legend
Major championships (2)
Other PGA Tour (8)

No.	Date	Tournament	Winning score	To par	Margin of victory	Runner(s)-up	Refs.
1	Jan 28, 1979	Andy Williams-San Diego Open Invitational	76-67-67-72=282	−6	5 strokes	(United States) Billy Kratzert, (United States) Wayne Levi, (United States) Artie McNickle, (United States) Tom Watson	
2	Apr 15, 1979	Masters Tournament	70-71-69-70=280	−8	Playoff	(United States) Ed Sneed, (United States) Tom Watson	
3	May 17, 1981	Colonial National Invitation	67-69-68-70=274	−6	4 strokes	(United States) Hale Irwin	
4	Apr 18, 1983	Sea Pines Heritage	67-72-65-71=275	−9	2 strokes	(Canada) Jim Nelford	
5	Sep 18, 1983	Panasonic Las Vegas Pro Celebrity Classic	63-70-70-64-73=340	−18	4 strokes	(United States) Rex Caldwell	
6	Jun 18, 1984	U.S. Open	71-66-69-70=276	−4	Playoff	(Australia) Greg Norman	
7	Mar 10, 1985	Hertz Bay Hill Classic	70-72-66-67=275	−9	2 strokes	(United States) Tom Watson	
8	Feb 2, 1986	AT&T Pebble Beach National Pro-Am	69-66-70=205 (Note: Shortened to 54 holes due to weather.)	−11	5 strokes	(United States) Payne Stewart	
9	Apr 20, 1986	Sea Pines Heritage (2)	68-68-69-71=276	−8	1 stroke	(United States) Chip Beck, (United States) Roger Maltbie, (Australia) Greg Norman	
10	Jul 13, 1986	Anheuser-Busch Golf Classic	70-68-72-64=274	−10	2 strokes	(United States) Jodie Mudd	

PGA Tour playoff record (2–2)

No.	Year	Tournament	Opponent(s)	Result	Refs.
1	1979	Masters Tournament	(United States) Ed Sneed, (United States) Tom Watson	Won with birdie on second extra hole	
2	1983	Colonial National Invitation	(United States) Jim Colbert	Lost to par on sixth extra hole	
3	1984	U.S. Open	(Australia) Greg Norman	Won 18-hole playoff; Zoeller: −3 (67), Norman: +5 (75)	
4	1994	Tour Championship	(United States) Mark McCumber	Lost to birdie on first extra hole	

=== Other wins (4) ===
- 1985 Skins Game
- 1986 Skins Game
- 1987 Merrill Lynch Shoot-Out Championship
- 2003 Tylenol Par-3 Shootout

=== Champions Tour wins (2) ===
Legend
Senior major championships (1)
Other Champions Tour (1)

No.	Date	Tournament	Winning score	Margin of victory	Runner(s)-up	Refs.
1	Jun 9, 2002	Senior PGA Championship	−2 (69-71-70-68=278)	1 stroke	(United States) Hale Irwin, (United States) Bobby Wadkins	
2	Jan 25, 2004	MasterCard Championship	−20 (67-65-64=196)	1 stroke	(United States) Dana Quigley	

=== Other senior wins (3) ===
- 2002 Senior Slam
- 2008 Wendy's Champions Skins Game (with Peter Jacobsen)
- 2009 Wendy's Champions Skins Game (with Ben Crenshaw)

== Major championships ==
=== Wins (2) ===
Year	Championship	54 holes	Winning score	To par	Margin	Runner(s)-up	Refs.
1979	Masters Tournament	6 shot deficit	70-71-69-70=280	−8	Playoff^{1}	(United States) Ed Sneed, (United States) Tom Watson	
1984	U.S. Open	1 shot deficit	71-66-69-70=276	−4	Playoff^{2}	(Australia) Greg Norman	

^{1}Defeated Sneed and Watson in a sudden-death playoff - Zoeller 4-3 (−1), Sneed 4-4 (E) and Watson 4-4 (E).
^{2}Defeated Norman in an 18-hole playoff - Zoeller 67 (–3), Norman 75 (+5).

=== Results timeline ===
Tournament	1976	1977	1978	1979
Masters Tournament				1
U.S. Open	T38	T44	CUT	CUT
The Open Championship				CUT
PGA Championship		T54	10	T54

Tournament	1980	1981	1982	1983	1984	1985	1986	1987	1988	1989
Masters Tournament	T19	T43	T10	T20	T31	CUT	T21	T27	T16	T26
U.S. Open	T53		T15	CUT	1	T9	T15	CUT	T8	CUT
The Open Championship	CUT		T8	T14	T14	T11	T8	T29	T52	CUT
PGA Championship	T41	2	CUT	T6		T54	CUT	64	CUT	CUT

Tournament	1990	1991	1992	1993	1994	1995	1996	1997	1998	1999
Masters Tournament	T20	T12	T19	T11	T35	CUT	CUT	T34	T33	CUT
U.S. Open	T8	T5	CUT	T68	T58	T21		T28	CUT	CUT
The Open Championship		T80		T14	3		CUT			
PGA Championship	T14	CUT		T31	T19	69	T36	CUT		

Tournament	2000	2001	2002	2003	2004	2005	2006	2007	2008	2009
Masters Tournament	CUT	CUT	CUT	CUT	CUT	CUT	CUT	60	CUT	CUT
U.S. Open										
The Open Championship										
PGA Championship			CUT							

Win
Top 10
Did not play

CUT = missed the halfway cut (3rd round cut in 1979 Open Championship)
"T" indicates a tie for a place.

=== Summary ===
Tournament	Wins	2nd	3rd	Top-5	Top-10	Top-25	Events	Cuts made
Masters Tournament	1	0	0	1	2	10	31	18
U.S. Open	1	0	0	2	5	8	22	14
The Open Championship	0	0	1	1	3	7	14	10
PGA Championship	0	1	0	1	3	5	20	13
Totals	2	1	1	5	13	30	87	55

- Most consecutive cuts made – 8 (1993 Masters – 1994 PGA)
- Longest streak of top-10s – 2 (twice)

== Results in The Players Championship ==
Tournament	1975	1976	1977	1978	1979	1980	1981	1982	1983	1984	1985	1986	1987	1988	1989	1990	1991	1992	1993	1994	1995	1996	1997	1998	1999
The Players Championship	CUT	79	CUT	CUT	CUT	CUT	CUT	T56	CUT		T27	CUT	T54	T23	T45	CUT	2	T64	T34	2	T55	T4	T14		CUT

Top 10
Did not play

CUT = missed the halfway cut
"T" indicates a tie for a place

== Champions Tour major championships ==
=== Wins (1) ===
Year	Championship	Winning score	To par	Margin	Runners-up	Refs.
2002	Senior PGA Championship	69-71-70-68=278	−2	2 strokes	(United States) Hale Irwin, (United States) Bobby Wadkins	

== U.S. national team appearances ==
Professional

- Ryder Cup: 1979 (winners), 1983 (winners), 1985
- Wendy's 3-Tour Challenge (representing Senior PGA Tour): 2001

== See also ==
- 1974 PGA Tour Qualifying School graduates
