= Liggett & Myers Open =

Golf tournament formerly on the PGA Tour

Tournament information
- Location: Cary, North Carolina
- Established: 1972
- Course: MacGregor Downs Country Club
- Par: 71
- Tour: PGA Tour
- Format: Stroke play
- Prize fund: US$100,000
- Month played: August
- Final year: 1973

Tournament record score
- Aggregate: 278 Bert Greene (1973)
- To par: −6 as above

Final champion
- (United States) Bert Greene
- Location in United States Location in North Carolina

The Liggett & Myers Open was a golf tournament on the PGA Tour. It was sponsored by the Liggett & Myers Tobacco Company.

It was played in 1972 and 1973 in conjunction with the U.S. Professional Match Play Championship. After the first two rounds of play, the top eight players dropped from the Liggett & Myers Open and joined eight exempt players to compete in the U.S. Professional Match Play Championship. The purse for the Liggett & Myers Open was $100,000 with $20,000 going to the winner, while the purse for the U.S. Professional Match Play Championship was $150,000 with $40,000 going to the winner and $5,000 going to first round losers.

== Tournament hosts ==
- 1973 MacGregor Downs Country Club in Cary, North Carolina.
- 1972 Country Club of North Carolina in Pinehurst, North Carolina.

== Winners ==
Year	Winner	Score	To par	Margin of victory	Runner(s)-up	Ref.
1973	(United States) Bert Greene	278	−6	Playoff	(United States) Miller Barber	
1972	(United States) Lou Graham	285	−3	1 stroke	(Australia) David Graham (United States) Hale Irwin (United States) Larry Ziegler	
