= Michigan Golf Classic =

Golf tournament formerly on the PGA Tour

Tournament information
- Location: Walled Lake, Michigan
- Established: 1969
- Courses: Shenandoah Golf and Country Club
- Par: 70
- Length: 6,708 yards (6,134 m)
- Tour: PGA Tour
- Format: Stroke play
- Prize fund: US$100,000
- Month played: September
- Final year: 1969

Tournament record score
- Aggregate: 272 Homero Blancas (1969); 272 Larry Ziegler (1969)
- To par: −12 as above

Final champion
- (United States) Larry Ziegler
- Location in the United States Location in Michigan

The Michigan Golf Classic was a tournament on the PGA Tour that was played in September 1969 at the Shenandoah Golf & Country Club, a par-70, 6,708-yard course in Walled Lake, Michigan. The event was won by Larry Ziegler, a 30-year-old from Bonne Terre, Missouri, and was his first PGA Tour win. He defeated former University of Houston star Homero Blancas with a birdie on the second hole of a sudden-death playoff.

Tournament Supervisor George Walsh shocked the players when he revealed that the sponsors of the fledgling tournament said they didn't have enough money to pay all the prizes. Players had been promised a total purse of $100,000 with $20,000 and a new car going to the winner.

== Winners ==
Year	Winner	Score	To par	Margin of victory	Runner-up
1969	(United States) Larry Ziegler	272	−12	Playoff	(United States) Homero Blancas
