= Jill McGill =

American professional golfer (born 1972)

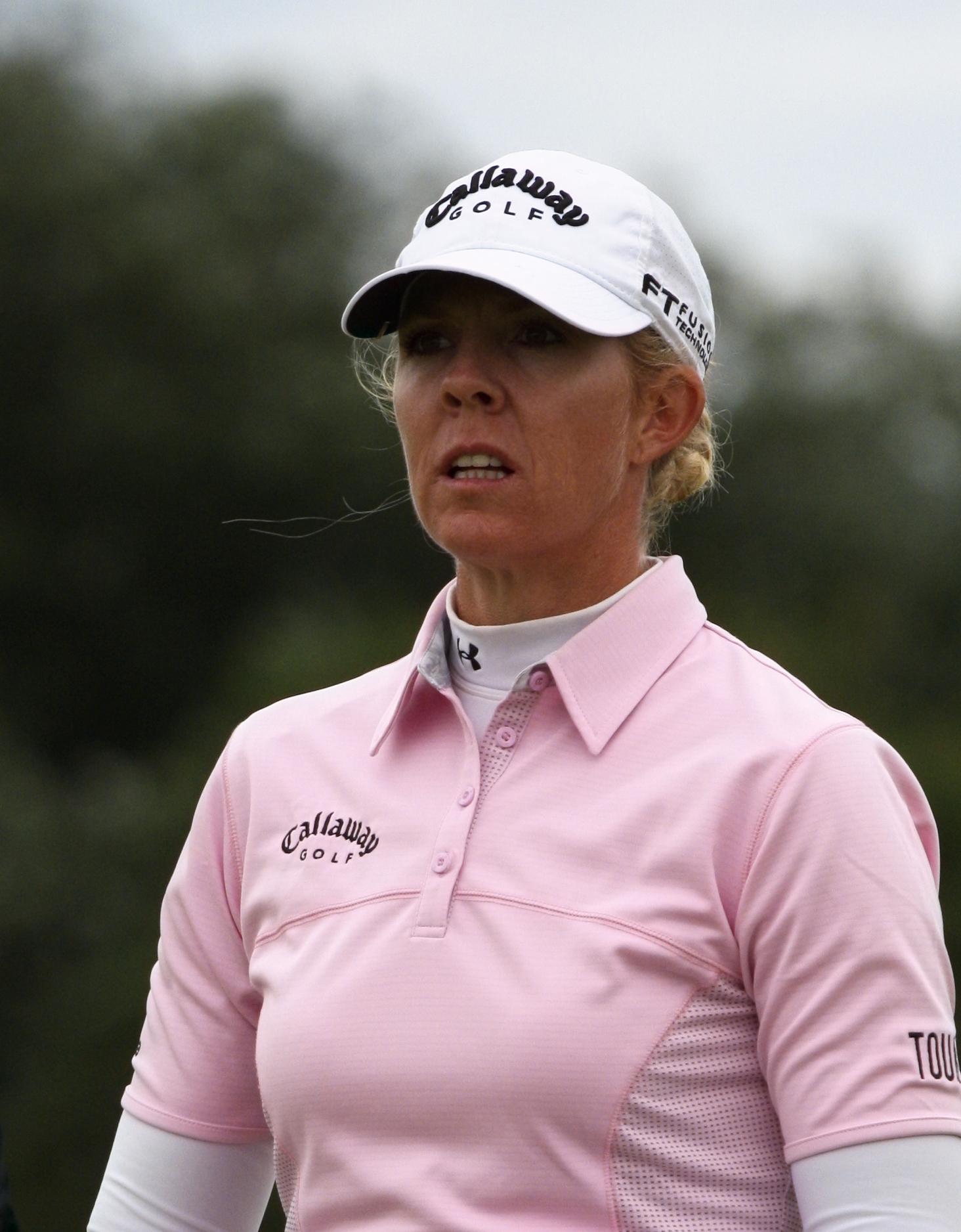
- McGill at the 2009 Women's British Open

Personal information
- Nationality: United States
- Born: January 30, 1972 (age 54) Denver, Colorado, U.S.
- Height: 6 ft 0 in (1.83 m)
- Spouse: Patrick Byerly

Career
- Sport: Golf
- College: University of Southern California
- Turned professional: 1994
- Former tours: LPGA Tour; Ladies European Tour
- Professional wins: 1

Best results in LPGA major championships
- Chevron Championship: T21: 2001
- Women's PGA C'ship: T7: 1999
- U.S. Women's Open: T12: 2002
- du Maurier Classic: T9: 1999
- Women's British Open: T15: 2001
- Evian Championship: DNP

Jill McGill (born January 30, 1972) is an American professional golfer who played on the LPGA Tour.

McGill was born in Denver, Colorado. She played college golf at the University of Southern California and won the U.S. Women's Amateur title in 1993 and the U.S. Women's Amateur Public Links in 1994. She played on the 1994 Curtis Cup team. She turned professional in December 1994.

McGill finished tied second at the 1995 Women's British Open, when it was co-sanctioned with the LPGA Tour and the Ladies European Tour, but not yet recognized as a major championship by the LPGA Tour.

McGill scored her first professional win at the 2022 U.S. Senior Women's Open at age 50.

== Personal life ==
McGill is married to Patrick Byerly. Her sister, Shelley O'Keefe, serves as her caddie. She has two children, a son and a daughter. McGill lives in Dallas, Texas.

== Professional wins (1) ==
=== Legends Tour wins (1) ===
Legend
Legends Tour major championships (1)
Other Legends Tour (0)

No.	Date	Tournament	Winning score	Margin of victory	Runner(s)-up
1	28 Aug 2022	U.S. Senior Women's Open	-3 (74-71-71-73=289)	1 stroke	(Sweden) Leta Lindley

== Team appearances ==
Amateur

- Curtis Cup (representing the United States): 1994 (tie)

Professional

- Lexus Cup (representing International team): 2005 (winners)
