= Smriti Mehra =

Indian professional golfer

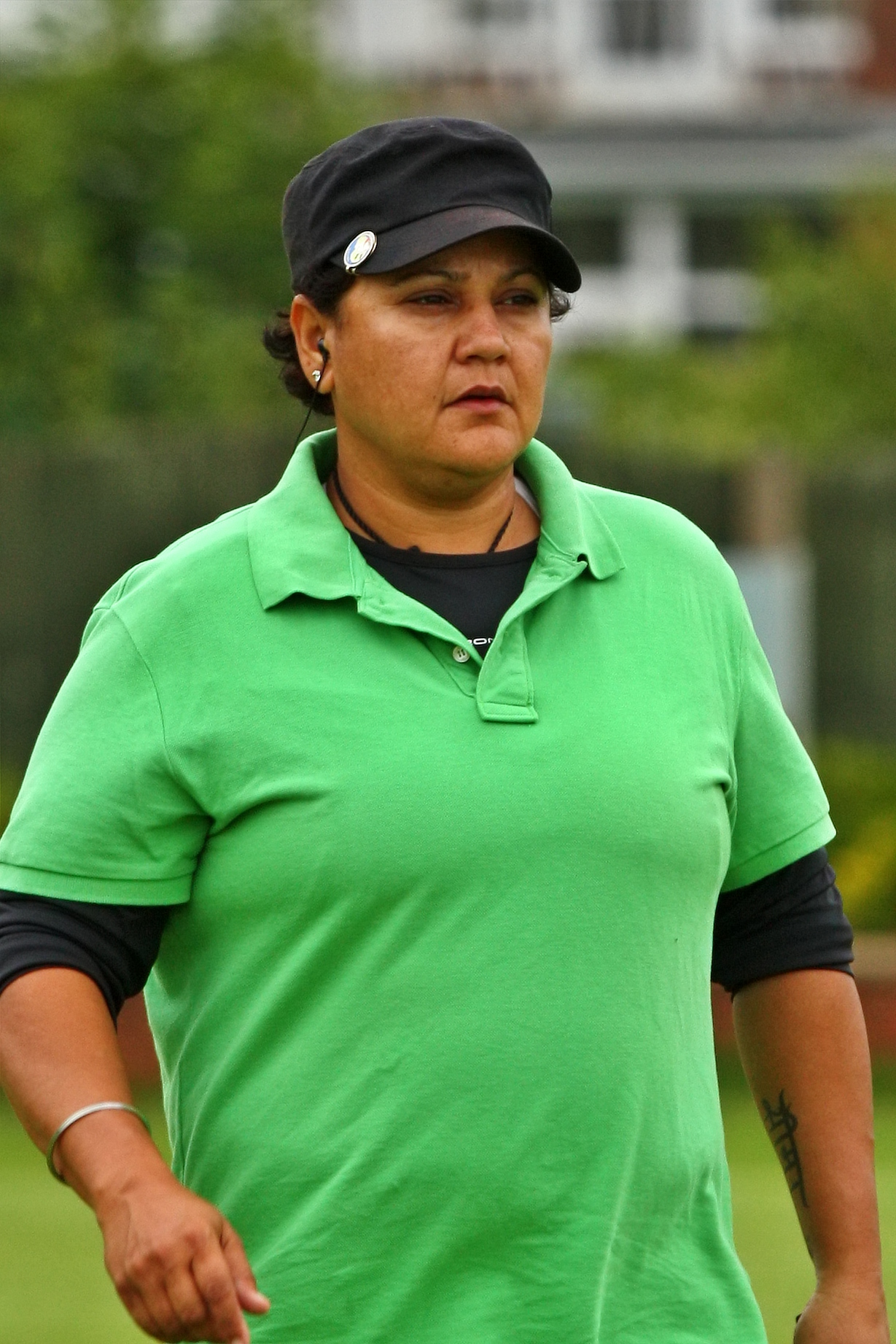
- Mehra during the 2010 Women's British Open

Personal information
- Nickname: Simi
- Nationality: India
- Born: 12 May 1972 (age 54) Kolkata, West Bengal, India
- Height: 5 ft 5 in (1.65 m)

Career
- Sport: Golf
- College: University of Calcutta
- Turned professional: 1994
- Former tours: LPGA Tour (1997–2008); Futures Tour (1994–2006)
- Professional wins: 4

Number of wins by tour
- Ladies Asian Golf Tour: 1
- Epson Tour: 3

Best results in LPGA major championships
- Chevron Championship: DNP
- Women's PGA C'ship: CUT: 1998, 1999, 2002, 2003
- U.S. Women's Open: T53: 2001
- du Maurier Classic: T27: 1998
- Women's British Open: CUT: 2001

Smriti "Simi" Mehra (born 21 May 1972) is the first woman from India to become a member of the world's leading golf tour for women, the US-based LPGA Tour. She is recognized as "a pioneer and a pillar for women's golf in India". She was born in Kolkata, and attended the University of Calcutta before turning professional in 1994.

Mehra qualified for the LPGA Tour after a victory in the second-tier Futures Tour in 1996. She played in the LPGA Tour from 1997–1999, and from 2001-2004. Her career was interrupted by shoulder surgery in 2005, after which she took part in the Futures Tour in 2006 in the hope of regaining her place at the top level.

In October 2005, Mehra played LPGA Tour golfers Heather Daly-Donofrio, Hilary Lunke and Celeste Troche in the first Women's Professional Skins Game in India to demonstrate top level women's golf in her home country.

In 2012, Mehra was named the "Player of the Year" at the Hero-WGAI awards function. She was credited with being part of the team that stabilised the women's pro tour. She played in all 15 events and won seven of them.

In addition to her own athletic accomplishments, Mehra impacted the golf world by co-founding the Women's Golf Association of India in order to offer Indian women golfers the opportunity to make golf a career.

== Personal life ==
Mehra learned to play golf at the Royal Calcutta Golf Club, inspired by her mother, Billy, who had been one of Southeast Asia's leading amateur golfers. Mehra spends her free time teaching disadvantaged children through the Golf Foundation of India.

== Amateur wins ==
- 1993 Malaysian National Championship
- 1994 Indian National Match Play Championship, Indian National Stroke Play Championship

== Professional wins (4) ==
=== Futures Tour wins (3) ===
- 1996 Green Mountain National FUTURES Golf Classic
- 2004 Frye Classic, Hunters Oak FUTURES Golf Classic

=== Ladies Asian Golf Tour wins (1) ===
- 2003 Malaysia Ladies Open

== Team appearances ==
Professional

- World Cup (representing India): 2008
