= Larry Ziegler =

American professional golfer (born 1939)

Personal information
- Nickname: Half Pay Ziegler
- Nationality: United States
- Born: August 12, 1939 (age 87) St. Louis, Missouri, U.S.
- Height: 6 ft 0 in (1.83 m)
- Weight: 185 lb (84 kg; 13.2 st)

Career
- Sport: Golf
- Turned professional: 1959
- Former tours: PGA Tour; Champions Tour
- Professional wins: 7

Number of wins by tour
- PGA Tour: 3
- PGA Tour Champions: 2

Best results in major championships
- Masters Tournament: T3: 1976
- PGA Championship: T5: 1969
- U.S. Open: T8: 1970
- The Open Championship: DNP

Larry Ziegler (born August 12, 1939) is an American professional golfer who played on the PGA Tour and the Champions Tour.

== Early life ==
Ziegler was born in St. Louis and grew up in Creve Coeur, Missouri. He was one of 14 children; he had seven brothers and six sisters. He began as a caddie and worked his way up to head club pro.

== Professional career ==
In 1959, Ziegler turned professional. He had more than 40 top-10 finishes in PGA Tour events during his career including three wins. He had three top-10 finishes in major championships; his best was T3 at the Masters Tournament in 1976.

In 1969, Ziegler won the Michigan Golf Classic. Ziegler originally did not receive any prize money for his victory as the sponsors went bankrupt during the course of the tournament. However, in early 1970 the PGA Tour managed to pay Ziegler the $20,000 he earned.

After reaching the age of 50 in August 1989, Ziegler joined the Senior PGA Tour, where he has recorded over 20 top-10 finishes including two wins. Ziegler's two Senior PGA Tour wins were six years apart – a record for the Tour. His second victory, at the 1998 Saint Luke's Classic, occurred when Ziegler's caddie was Baseball Hall of Fame member George Brett.

Ziegler once was on the board of directors for the St. Louis Blues hockey team.

== Awards and honors ==
In 2024, Ziegler was inducted into the Missouri Sports Hall of Fame.

== Professional wins (7) ==
=== PGA Tour wins (3) ===
No.	Date	Tournament	Winning score	Margin of victory	Runner(s)-up
1	Sep 7, 1969	Michigan Golf Classic	–12 (72-70-66-64=272)	Playoff	(United States) Homero Blancas
2	Mar 23, 1975	Greater Jacksonville Open	–12 (73-69-69-65=276)	2 strokes	(United States) Mac McLendon, (United States) Mike Morley
3	Apr 25, 1976	First NBC New Orleans Open	–14 (69-68-67-70=274)	1 stroke	(Mexico) Victor Regalado

PGA Tour playoff record (1–1)

No.	Year	Tournament	Opponent(s)	Result
1	1969	Michigan Golf Classic	(United States) Homero Blancas	Won with birdie on second extra hole
2	1972	Liggett & Myers Open	(Australia) David Graham, (United States) Lou Graham, (United States) Hale Irwin	L. Graham won with birdie on third extra hole D. Graham and Ziegler eliminated by par on first hole

=== Other wins (2) ===
- 1974 Hassan II Golf Trophy
- 1980 Friendship Cup (Costa Rica)

=== Senior PGA Tour wins (2) ===
No.	Date	Tournament	Winning score	Margin of victory	Runner(s)-up
1	Ju1 14, 1991	Newport Cup	–17 (66-66-67=199)	6 strokes	(United States) George Archer, (United States) Jim Dent, (United States) Tom Shaw
2	May 17, 1998	Saint Luke's Classic	–2 (69-67-72=208)	1 stroke	(United States) Tom Shaw

== Results in major championships ==
Tournament	1965	1966	1967	1968	1969	1970	1971	1972	1973	1974	1975	1976	1977	1978	1979	1980	1981	1982
Masters Tournament						CUT	T30			T39	T13	T3	CUT					
U.S. Open	CUT			T24	CUT	T8	CUT	CUT	T13	T12	CUT				T41	CUT		T53
PGA Championship				T73	T5	T45	T46		CUT	T32	CUT	CUT					CUT	

Note: Ziegler never played in The Open Championship.

Top 10
Did not play

CUT = missed the half-way cut
"T" indicates a tie for a place

=== Summary ===
Tournament	Wins	2nd	3rd	Top-5	Top-10	Top-25	Events	Cuts made
Masters Tournament	0	0	1	1	1	2	6	4
U.S. Open	0	0	0	0	1	4	12	6
The Open Championship	0	0	0	0	0	0	0	0
PGA Championship	0	0	0	1	1	1	9	5
Totals	0	0	1	2	3	7	27	15

- Most consecutive cuts made – 4 (1974 Masters – 1975 Masters)
- Longest streak of top-10s – 1 (three times)
