= 1969 PGA Championship =

Coordinates: 39.680°N 84.196°W

Tournament information
- Dates: August 14–17, 1969
- Location: Kettering, Ohio
- Course(s): NCR Country Club, South Course
- Organized by: PGA of America
- Tour(s): PGA Tour

Statistics
- Par: 71
- Length: 6,915 yards (6,323 m)
- Field: 139 players, 79 after cut
- Cut: 149 (+7)
- Prize fund: $175,000
- Winner's share: $35,000

Champion
- (United States) Raymond Floyd
- 276 (−8)

Location in United States
Location in Ohio

The 1969 PGA Championship was the 51st PGA Championship, played August 14–17 on the South Course of NCR Country Club in Kettering, Ohio, a suburb south of Dayton. Raymond Floyd, age 26, won the first of his four major titles, one stroke ahead of runner-up Gary Player.

Floyd held a five-shot lead after the third round, at 202 (−11), and carded a 74 (+3) on Sunday.

During the tournament's third round, demonstrators tried to disrupt the play of Player and Jack Nicklaus. Ice was thrown in Player's face and one spectator yelled while Nicklaus prepared to putt. Security was stepped up for the final round on Sunday.

This was the first PGA Championship after the formation of the "Tournament Players Division" in December 1968, later renamed the PGA Tour. It also marked the permanent move of the PGA Championship to August (although it only lasted for decades until it rescheduled in 2019), excluding 1971, which was played in Florida in February. Except for 1965, it had been played in July in the 1960s; five times during the decade it was held the week immediately after The Open Championship in Britain, including 1968. The new scheduling allowed more players to participate in both majors, cementing the concept of the modern grand slam.

The attendance on Sunday was 23,543 and a new record was set for the four days at 80,847; including practice days, the week's attendance was 106,043.

== Round summaries ==
=== First round ===
Thursday, August 14, 1969

Place	Player	Score	To par
T1	(United States) Charles Coody	69	−2
T1	(United States) Raymond Floyd	69	−2
T1	(United States) Al Geiberger	69	−2
T1	(United States) Bunky Henry	69	−2
T1	(United States) Bob Lunn	69	−2
T1	(United States) Larry Mowry	69	−2
T1	(United States) Johnny Pott	69	−2
T1	(United States) Tom Shaw	69	−2
T1	(United States) Larry Ziegler	69	−2
T10	(United States) Tommy Aaron	70	−1
T10	(United States) Frank Beard	70	−1
T10	(Australia) Bruce Crampton	70	−1
T10	(United States) Jacky Cupit	70	−1
T10	(Australia) Bruce Devlin	70	−1
T10	(Canada) George Knudson	70	−1
T10	(United States) Jack Nicklaus	70	−1
T10	(United States) Phil Rodgers	70	−1
T10	(United States) Tom Weiskopf	70	−1

=== Second round ===
Friday, August 15, 1969

Place	Player	Score	To par
1	(United States) Raymond Floyd	69-66=135	−7
2	(South Africa) Gary Player	71-65=136	−6
3	(United States) Bunky Henry	69-68=137	−5
T4	(United States) Don Bies	74-64=138	−4
T4	(United States) Orville Moody	70-68=138	−4
T4	(United States) Jack Nicklaus	70-68=138	−4
T7	(United States) Bert Greene	71-68=139	−3
T7	(United States) Jimmy Wright	71-68=139	−3
T9	(United States) Ron Cerrudo	74-66=140	−2
T9	(United States) Charles Coody	69-71=140	−2
T9	(Australia) Bruce Crampton	70-70=140	−2
T9	(United States) Larry Mowry	69-71=140	−2
T9	(United States) Larry Ziegler	69-71=140	−2

=== Third round ===
Saturday, August 16, 1969

Place	Player	Score	To par
1	(United States) Raymond Floyd	69-66-67=202	−11
T2	(United States) Bert Greene	71-68-68=207	−6
T2	(United States) Bunky Henry	69-68-70=207	−6
T2	(South Africa) Gary Player	71-65-71=207	−6
5	(United States) Jimmy Wright	71-68-69=208	−5
T6	(United States) Don Bies	74-64-71=209	−4
T6	(United States) Orville Moody	70-68-71=209	−4
T6	(United States) Larry Mowry	69-71-69=209	−4
T9	(United States) Ron Cerrudo	74-66-70=210	−3
T9	(United States) Larry Ziegler	69-71-70=210	−3

=== Final round ===
Sunday, August 17, 1969

Place	Player	Score	To par	Money ($)
1	(United States) Raymond Floyd	69-66-67-74=276	−8	35,000
2	(South Africa) Gary Player	71-65-71-70=277	−7	20,000
3	(United States) Bert Greene	71-68-68-71=278	−6	12,400
4	(United States) Jimmy Wright	71-68-69-71=279	−5	8,300
T5	(United States) Miller Barber	73-75-64-68=280	−4	6,725
T5	(United States) Larry Ziegler	69-71-70-70=280	−4	6,725
T7	(United States) Charles Coody	69-71-72-69=281	−3	5,144
T7	(United States) Orville Moody	70-68-71-72=281	−3	5,144
T7	(United States) Terry Wilcox	72-71-72-66=281	−3	5,144
10	(United States) Frank Beard	70-75-68-69=282	−2	4,375
