= Ed Sneed =

American professional golfer (born 1944)

Personal information
- Full name: Edgar Sneed Jr.
- Nationality: United States
- Born: August 6, 1944 (age 82) Roanoke, Virginia, U.S.
- Height: 6 ft 2 in (1.88 m)
- Weight: 185 lb (84 kg; 13.2 st)

Career
- Sport: Golf
- College: Ohio State University
- Turned professional: 1967
- Former tours: PGA Tour; Champions Tour
- Professional wins: 8

Number of wins by tour
- PGA Tour: 4
- PGA Tour of Australasia: 1
- Other: 3

Best results in major championships
- Masters Tournament: T2: 1979
- PGA Championship: T28: 1979
- U.S. Open: T8: 1980
- The Open Championship: T26: 1979

Edgar Sneed Jr. (born August 6, 1944) is an American professional golfer, sportscaster and course design consultant, who played on the PGA Tour and the Champions Tour.

== Biography ==
Sneed was born in Roanoke, Virginia. He graduated from Ohio State University and was a member of the golf team. He turned pro in 1967. He worked briefly at Scioto Country Club in Columbus, Ohio, the same golf course where Jack Nicklaus learned to play golf.

Sneed won four PGA Tour events during his career. His first professional win, however, was in Australia. On October 14, 1973, he won the Australian Tour's New South Wales Open by two strokes over Australian Bob Shearer. One shot back of Shearer on the 17th, Sneed finished eagle-par to defeat Shearer by two shots. The very next week, on October 21, 1973, he won his first PGA Tour tournament at the Kaiser International Open Invitational. He defeated U.S. Open runner-up John Schlee in a playoff. A year later he was a wire-to-wire winner at the Greater Milwaukee Open. Sneed was a member of the Ryder Cup team in 1977. He had 46 top-10 finishes in his career on the PGA Tour.

Sneed is best known for his performance at the 1979 Masters Tournament. He began Sunday's round with a 5-stroke lead. He had a 3-stroke lead with three holes to play but bogeyed them all. He went into a sudden-death playoff with Tom Watson and Fuzzy Zoeller, but lost to Zoeller on the second hole. This was the first time the Masters used a sudden-death format to decide the Championship.

He finished runner-up on the European Tour's 1979 Irish Open and won the unofficial 1980 Morocco Grand Prix over Lee Trevino. Sneed's last win was at the 1982 Michelob-Houston Open. Like his first official win, defeated Bob Shearer down the wire (this time in a playoff).

Sneed made his debut on the Senior PGA Tour in 1994 upon reaching the age of 50. His best finish in this venue is a T-5 at the 1995 Bell Atlantic Classic.

Sneed worked for eight years as a golf broadcaster for ABC television and was with CNBC in 2001. He has also done some course design consulting. He lives in Palm Harbor, Florida. He plans on providing golf instruction with director of golf, Larry Dornisch, at Muirfield Village Golf Club in Dublin, Ohio.

== Amateur wins ==
- 1965 Ohio Intercollegiate

== Professional wins (8) ==
=== PGA Tour wins (4) ===
No.	Date	Tournament	Winning score	Margin of victory	Runner-up
1	Oct 21, 1973	Kaiser International Open Invitational	−13 (68-66-69-72=275)	Playoff	(United States) John Schlee
2	Jul 6, 1974	Greater Milwaukee Open	−12 (66-67-71-72=276)	4 strokes	(United States) Grier Jones
3	Apr 17, 1977	Tallahassee Open	−12 (68-70-68-70=276)	Playoff	(United States) Lon Hinkle
4	May 9, 1982	Michelob-Houston Open	−9 (64-70-71-70=275)	Playoff	(Australia) Bob Shearer

PGA Tour playoff record (3–1)

No.	Year	Tournament	Opponent(s)	Result
1	1973	Kaiser International Open Invitational	(United States) John Schlee	Won with par on first extra hole
2	1977	Tallahassee Open	(United States) Lon Hinkle	Won with birdie on first extra hole
3	1979	Masters Tournament	(United States) Tom Watson, (United States) Fuzzy Zoeller	Zoeller won with birdie on second extra hole
4	1982	Michelob-Houston Open	(Australia) Bob Shearer	Won with birdie on first extra hole

=== PGA Tour of Australasia wins (1) ===
No.	Date	Tournament	Winning score	Margin of victory	Runner-up
1	Oct 14, 1973	New South Wales Open	−5 (70-71-70-72=283)	2 strokes	(Australia) Bob Shearer

=== Other wins (3) ===
- 1972 Maumelle Open
- 1978 Jerry Ford Invitational (tie with Dale Douglass)
- 1980 Hassan II Golf Trophy

== Results in major championships ==
Tournament	1972	1973	1974	1975	1976	1977	1978	1979	1980	1981	1982	1983	1984	1985	1986	1987	1988
Masters Tournament			43	CUT			T18	T2	T44	CUT		CUT					
U.S. Open	CUT	CUT		T29			T46	T11	T8	CUT		CUT					
The Open Championship							CUT	T26			CUT		CUT				CUT
PGA Championship		T35	CUT	T54	T57	T36	T64	T28	T55	T70	T61	T80					

Top 10
Did not play

CUT = missed the half-way cut
"T" indicates a tie for a place

=== Summary ===
Tournament	Wins	2nd	3rd	Top-5	Top-10	Top-25	Events	Cuts made
Masters Tournament	0	1	0	1	1	2	7	4
U.S. Open	0	0	0	0	1	2	8	4
The Open Championship	0	0	0	0	0	0	5	1
PGA Championship	0	0	0	0	0	0	11	10
Totals	0	1	0	1	2	4	31	19

- Most consecutive cuts made – 8 (1978 PGA – 1980 PGA)
- Longest streak of top-10s – 1 (twice)

== See also ==
- Fall 1968 PGA Tour Qualifying School graduates

== U.S. national team appearances ==
Professional

- Ryder Cup: 1977 (winners)
