= NCR Country Club =

Country club in Dayton, Ohio

- Interactive map of NCR Country Club
- 39°42′12″N 84°11′30″W

Club information
- Location: Dayton, Ohio (Kettering)
- Established: 1954
- Type: Private
- Tota holes: 36
- Tournaments: 1969 PGA Championship; 1986 U.S. Women's Open; 2005 U.S. Senior Open 2022 U.S. Senior Women's Open
- Greens: Bent grass
- Fairways: Bent grass
- Website: www.NCRCountryClub.com

North
- Designed by: Dick Wilson
- Par: 71
- Length: 7150
- Course rating: 72.9
- Slope rating: 134

South
- Designed by: Dick Wilson
- Par: 71 (73 for 2022 USSWO)
- Length: 7055 (6199 for 2022 USSWO)
- Course rating: 74.3
- Slope rating: 143

NCR Country Club is a country club located in Dayton, Ohio where NCR Corporation used to be headquartered. There are two golf courses at the club, the North course and the South course. The 1969 PGA Championship was played on the South course and won by Raymond Floyd. It also hosted the 2005 U.S. Senior Open won by Allen Doyle and the 1986 U.S. Women's Open, which was won by Jane Geddes. The 2022 U.S. Senior Women's Open was won by Jill McGill.

== Tournaments hosted ==
- 2022 U.S. Senior Women's Open
- 2005 U.S. Senior Open
- 1986 U.S. Women's Open
- 1969 PGA Championship

== Scorecard ==
North Course
Tee	Rating/Slope	1	2	3	4	5	6	7	8	9	Out	10	11	12	13	14	15	16	17	18	In	Total
Black	73.6/125	361	581	181	460	468	392	347	474	205	3469	379	204	610	229	403	417	462	400	455	3559	7028
Gold	70.6/126	340	524	161	426	415	377	328	449	188	3208	365	177	484	191	387	391	367	384	432	3178	6386
White	M:68.5/121 W:73.9/131	317	506	147	379	394	328	309	403	169	2952	350	151	459	161	371	363	349	368	414	2986	5938
Silver	M:64.4/113 W:69.0/120	236	444	133	302	315	279	277	327	147	2460	272	138	379	131	323	330	294	321	340	2528	4988
Copper	M:63.3/111 W:67.6/117	229	432	119	288	305	270	264	314	137	2358	263	132	370	121	308	319	280	302	328	2423	4781
SI	Men's	17	5	13	1	7	9	15	3	11		4	12	18	16	14	6	2	10	8
Par		4	5	3	4	4	4	4	4	3	35	4	3	5	3	4	4	4	4	4	35	70
SI	Women's	17	5	11	9	1	7	13	5	15		14	12	6	18	16	2	8	10	4

South Course
Tee	Rating/Slope	1	2	3	4	5	6	7	8	9	Out	10	11	12	13	14	15	16	17	18	In	Total
Black	74.5/139	449	174	423	389	549	530	428	174	442	3558	618	374	458	204	401	235	455	354	419	3518	7076
Gold	M:72.4/139 W:78.9/148	433	155	403	354	527	497	409	153	412	3343	548	360	441	186	367	200	441	339	404	3286	6629
White	M:70.1/134 W:76.2/142	416	129	381	298	501	475	384	131	383	3098	515	345	421	172	321	174	427	324	479	3078	6176
Silver	M:65.8/125 W:70.9/130	364	119	337	279	408	423	318	107	331	2686	423	270	353	107	256	145	329	279	306	2531	5217
SI	Men's	7	17	1	11	5	13	9	15	3		12	10	4	18	6	14	2	16	8
Par		4	3	4	4	5	5	4	3	4	36	5	4	4	3	4	3	4	4	4	35	71
SI	Women's	7	15	1	13	11	5	9	17	3		10	12	2	18	16	6	4	14	8
