= 1984 U.S. Open (golf) =

Coordinates: 40.9577°N 73.7538°W

Tournament information
- Dates: June 14–18, 1984
- Location: Mamaroneck, New York
- Courses: Winged Foot Golf Club, West Course
- Tour: PGA Tour

Statistics
- Par: 70
- Length: 6,930 yards (6,337 m)
- Field: 155 players, 63 after cut
- Cut: 147 (+7)
- Prize fund: $596,925
- Winner's share: $94,000

Champion
- (United States) Fuzzy Zoeller
- 276 (−4), playoff

Location in the United States
Location in New York

The 1984 U.S. Open was the 84th U.S. Open, held June 14–18 at Winged Foot Golf Club in Mamaroneck, New York, a suburb northeast of New York City. Fuzzy Zoeller defeated Greg Norman in an 18-hole playoff to win his first U.S. Open title and second major championship.

Arnold Palmer failed to qualify for this U.S. Open, snapping a streak of 31 consecutive Opens played, which began in 1953. The 1960 champion played in one more, at Oakmont in 1994.

This was the fourth U.S. Open at Winged Foot's West Course; it previously hosted in 1929, 1959, and 1974. It later hosted the PGA Championship in 1997 and the U.S. Open in 2006 and 2020.

== Course layout ==
West Course

Hole	Name	Yards	Par	Hole	Name	Yards	Par
1	Genesis	446	4	10	Pulpit	190	3
2	Elm	411	4	11	Billows	383	4
3	Pinnacle	216	3	12	Cape	535	5
4	Sound View	460	4	13	White Mule	212	3
5	Long Lane	515	5	14	Shamrock	418	4
6	El	324	4	15	Pyramid	417	4
7	Babe-in-the-Woods	161	3	16	Hells Bells	452	4
8	Arena	442	4	17	Well-Well	444	4
9	Meadow	456	4	18	Revelations	448	4
Out		3,431	35	In		3,499	35
Source:				Total		6,930	70

Lengths of the course for previous majors:

- 1974 U.S. Open: 6,961 yards (6,365 m), par 70
- 1959 U.S. Open: 6,873 yards (6,285 m), par 70
- 1929 U.S. Open: 6,786 yards (6,205 m), par 72

== Round summaries ==
=== First round ===
Thursday, June 14, 1984

Place	Player	Score	To par
T1	(United States) Mike Donald	68	−2
T1	(United States) Hubert Green	68	−2
T1	(United States) Hale Irwin	68	−2
T1	(United States) Jim Thorpe	68	−2
T5	(Spain) Seve Ballesteros	69	−1
T5	(United States) David Canipe	69	−1
T5	(United States) Lennie Clements	69	−1
T5	(United States) Fred Couples	69	−1
T5	(United States) Jay Sigel (a)	69	−1
T5	(United States) Mick Soli	69	−1
T5	(United States) Curtis Strange	69	−1

=== Second round ===
Friday, June 15, 1984

Place	Player	Score	To par
1	(United States) Hale Irwin	68-68=136	−4
2	(United States) Fuzzy Zoeller	71-66=137	−3
T3	(United States) David Canipe	69-69=138	−2
T3	(Australia) Greg Norman	70-68=138	−2
T5	(United States) Curtis Strange	69-70=139	−1
T5	(United States) Jim Thorpe	68-71=139	−1
7	(United States) Fred Couples	69-71=140	E
T8	(United States) Andy Bean	70-71=141	+1
T8	(United States) Jay Sigel (a)	69-72=141	+1
T10	(Japan) Isao Aoki	72-70=142	+2
T10	(Spain) Seve Ballesteros	69-73=142	+2
T10	(United States) Johnny Miller	74-68=142	+2
T10	(United States) Jack Nicklaus	71-71=142	+2
T10	(United States) Mike Reid	70-72=142	+2

Amateurs: Sigel (+1), Fehr (+7), Tentis (+8), Kirby (+9), Case (+10), Mediate (+11), Gallagher (+16), Hadden (+17), Burroughs (+19), Friend (+20), Ludwig (+20).

=== Third round ===
Saturday, June 16, 1984

Place	Player	Score	To par
1	(United States) Hale Irwin	68-68-69=205	−5
2	(United States) Fuzzy Zoeller	71-66-69=206	−4
3	(Australia) Greg Norman	70-68-69=207	−3
4	(United States) Jim Thorpe	68-71-70=209	−1
5	(United States) Tim Simpson	72-71-68=211	+1
T6	(United States) Morris Hatalsky	70-73-69=212	+2
T6	(United States) Johnny Miller	74-68-70=212	+2
T6	(United States) Jack Nicklaus	71-71-70=212	+2
T6	(United States) Lee Trevino	71-72-69=212	+2
T10	(Australia) David Graham	71-72-70=213	+3
T10	(United States) Curtis Strange	69-70-74=213	+3
T10	(United States) Mike Sullivan	70-73-70=213	+3

=== Final round ===
Sunday, June 17, 1984

Hale Irwin, the 1974 champion at Winged Foot, was the 54-hole leader, but faded in the final round with a 79 to finish in sixth place. With Irwin's collapse, the tournament became a duel between Zoeller and Norman. Zoeller led Norman by three shots heading to the back-nine, but Norman managed to draw level by the time he reached 18. His approach shot on the last sailed into the grandstand, but he managed to save par by holing a 45-foot (14 m) putt. Zoeller, standing in the 18th fairway, waved a white towel as a playful sign of surrender, then proceeded to par the hole himself to force a playoff. The two finished at 276 (−4), five shots clear of the rest of the field.

Place	Player	Score	To par	Money ($)
T1	(United States) Fuzzy Zoeller	71-66-69-70=276	−4	Playoff
T1	(Australia) Greg Norman	70-68-69-69=276	−4	Playoff
3	(United States) Curtis Strange	69-70-74-68=281	+1	36,000
T4	(United States) Johnny Miller	74-68-70-70=282	+2	22,335
T4	(United States) Jim Thorpe	68-71-70-73=282	+2	22,335
6	(United States) Hale Irwin	68-68-69-79=284	+4	16,238
T7	(United States) Peter Jacobsen	72-73-73-67=285	+5	14,237
T7	(United States) Mark O'Meara	71-74-71-69=285	+5	14,237
T9	(United States) Fred Couples	69-71-74-72=286	+6	12,122
T9	(United States) Lee Trevino	71-72-69-74=286	+6	12,122

Amateurs: Fehr (+14), Sigel (+14).

==== Scorecard ====
Final round

Hole	1	2	3	4	5	6	7	8	9	10	11	12	13	14	15	16	17	18
Par	4	4	3	4	5	4	3	4	4	3	4	5	3	4	4	4	4	4
(United States) Zoeller	−4	−3	−4	−5	−6	−7	−7	−7	−7	−6	−6	−6	−6	−5	−5	−5	−4	−4
(Australia) Norman	−2	−2	−2	−2	−3	−3	−4	−4	−4	−4	−4	−3	−3	−4	−4	−4	−4	−4
(United States) Strange	+3	+2	+2	+2	+2	+1	+2	+2	+2	+2	+2	+2	+2	+2	+1	+1	+1	+1
(United States) Miller	+2	+3	+4	+5	+5	+4	+3	+3	+3	+3	+2	+1	+2	+2	+2	+3	+3	+2
(United States) Thorpe	E	E	E	E	−1	−1	−1	−1	−1	E	−1	−2	E	E	E	E	+1	+2
(United States) Irwin	−4	−4	−3	−3	−2	−3	−3	−2	E	E	E	+1	+1	+2	+2	+3	+4	+4

Cumulative tournament scores, relative to par

Birdie	Bogey	Double bogey

=== Playoff ===
Monday, June 18, 1984

The playoff proved to be no contest. Both birdied the first and Zoeller the 2nd, but Norman double-bogeyed it and fell three strokes behind. Zoeller carried a five-shot lead at the turn. Network coverage on ABC joined the round in progress, on the back nine at 4 pm EDT. Zoeller finished with a 67, eight shots better than Norman; this time on 18, it was Norman who waved a white towel in mock surrender. Zoeller's 67 was the lowest round ever recorded in a U.S. Open playoff.

Place	Player	Score	To par	Money ($)
1	(United States) Fuzzy Zoeller	34-33=67	−3	94,000
2	(Australia) Greg Norman	39-36=75	+5	47,000

==== Scorecard ====
Hole	1	2	3	4	5	6	7	8	9	10	11	12	13	14	15	16	17	18
Par	4	4	3	4	5	4	3	4	4	3	4	5	3	4	4	4	4	4
(United States) Zoeller	−1	−2	−1	−1	−1	−1	−1	−1	−1	−1	−1	−2	−2	−3	−3	−3	−3	−3
(Australia) Norman	−1	+1	+2	+3	+3	+2	+3	+4	+4	+4	+4	+3	+3	+4	+5	+6	+5	+5
Zoeller's lead	0	3	3	4	4	3	4	5	5	5	5	5	5	7	8	9	8	8

Birdie	Bogey	Double bogey
