= Rod Curl =

American professional golfer (born 1943)

Personal information
- Full name: Rodney Dean Curl
- Nickname: Little Beaver
- Nationality: United States
- Born: January 9, 1943 (age 83) Redding, California, U.S.
- Height: 5 ft 5 in (1.65 m)
- Weight: 160 lb (73 kg; 11 st)

Career
- Sport: Golf
- Turned professional: 1968
- Former tours: PGA Tour; Pro Golf Tour
- Professional wins: 3

Number of wins by tour
- PGA Tour: 1
- Other: 2

Best results in major championships
- Masters Tournament: T15: 1975
- PGA Championship: T20: 1980
- U.S. Open: T30: 1978
- The Open Championship: CUT: 1975

Rodney Dean Curl (born January 9, 1943) is an American professional golfer best known for being the first full-blooded Native American to win a PGA Tour event.

== Early life ==
Curl was born in Redding, California. He is a Wintu Indian. Before taking up golf at age 19, he was an outstanding baseball player at Central Valley High School in Shasta County, California.

== Professional career ==
In 1968, Curl turned pro. He joined the PGA Tour in 1969 and played regularly through 1978. He had 42 top-10 finishes in official PGA Tour events including one win and a half-dozen second and third-place finishes. In 1974, he won the Colonial National Invitation in Fort Worth by one stroke after runner-up Jack Nicklaus bogeyed the 17th hole and a birdied the last.

Curl played in a limited number of Senior PGA Tour events after reaching the age of 50 in 1993. Late in life, he worked as a corporate instructor with VIP Golf Academy.

== Personal life ==
Curl lives in Jupiter, Florida.

== Professional wins (3) ==
=== PGA Tour wins (1) ===
No.	Date	Tournament	Winning score	To par	Margin of victory	Runner-up
1	May 19, 1974	Colonial National Invitation	70-67-71-68=276	−4	1 stroke	(United States) Jack Nicklaus

=== Pro Golf Tour wins (1) ===
No.	Date	Tournament	Winning score	To par	Margin of victory	Runner-up
1	May 29, 1988	Pointe Royale Invitational	68-71-64-64=267	−13	4 strokes	(United States) Ben Theobald

=== Other wins (1) ===
- 1977 World Indian Open

== See also ==
- Spring 1969 PGA Tour Qualifying School graduates
- 1985 PGA Tour Qualifying School graduates
