= 1986 Senior PGA Tour =

Golf tour season

1986 Senior PGA Tour season
- Duration: January 8, 1986 – November 23, 1986
- Number of official events: 28
- Most wins: (Australia) Bruce Crampton (7)
- Money list: (Australia) Bruce Crampton

The 1986 Senior PGA Tour was the seventh season of the Senior PGA Tour, the main professional golf tour in the United States for men aged 50 and over.

== Schedule ==
The following table lists official events during the 1986 season.

Date	Tournament	Location	Purse (US$)	Winner (Note: The number in parentheses after each winner's name is the number of Senior PGA Tour events they had won up to and including that tournament. This information is only shown for Senior PGA Tour members.)	Notes
Jan 11	MONY Senior Tournament of Champions	California	100,000	(United States) Miller Barber (18)	
Feb 9	Treasure Coast Classic	Florida	225,000	(United States) Charles Owens (1)	
Feb 16	General Foods PGA Seniors' Championship	Florida	250,000	(South Africa) Gary Player (2)	Senior major championship
Mar 16	Del E. Webb Senior PGA Tour Roundup	Arizona	200,000	(United States) Charles Owens (2)	
Mar 23	Vintage Invitational	California	300,000	(United States) Dale Douglass (1)	
Mar 30	Johnny Mathis Seniors Classic	California	250,000	(United States) Dale Douglass (2)	
May 4	Sunwest Bank Charley Pride Senior Golf Classic	New Mexico	250,000	(United States) Gene Littler (4)	New to Senior PGA Tour
May 11	Benson & Hedges Invitational	Texas	250,000	(Australia) Bruce Crampton (1)	
May 18	United Hospitals Senior Golf Championship	Pennsylvania	200,000	(South Africa) Gary Player (3)	
Jun 1	Denver Post Champions of Golf	Colorado	250,000	(South Africa) Gary Player (4)	
Jun 8	Senior Players Reunion Pro-Am	Texas	175,000	(United States) Don January (19)	Pro-Am
Jun 22	Senior Tournament Players Championship	Ohio	300,000	(United States) Chi-Chi Rodríguez (1)	Senior PGA Tour major championship
Jun 29	U.S. Senior Open	Ohio	275,000	(United States) Dale Douglass (3)	Senior major championship
Jul 13	The Greenbrier American Express Championship	West Virginia	200,000	(United States) Don January (20)	
Jul 20	Greater Grand Rapids Open	Michigan	250,000	(United States) Jim Ferree (1)	New tournament
Jul 27	MONY Syracuse Senior's Pro Golf Classic	New York	200,000	(Australia) Bruce Crampton (2)	
Aug 3	Merrill Lynch/Golf Digest Commemorative	New York	250,000	(United States) Lee Elder (7)	
Aug 10	Digital Seniors Classic	Massachusetts	200,000	(United States) Chi-Chi Rodríguez (2)	
Aug 17	GTE Northwest Classic	Washington	250,000	(Australia) Bruce Crampton (3)	New tournament
Aug 31	Bank One Senior Golf Classic	Kentucky	200,000	(United States) Gene Littler (5)	
Sep 14	United Virginia Bank Seniors	Virginia	300,000	(United States) Chi-Chi Rodríguez (3)	
Sep 21	PaineWebber World Seniors Invitational	North Carolina	200,000	(Australia) Bruce Crampton (4)	
Oct 12	Fairfield Barnett Classic	Florida	175,000	(United States) Dale Douglass (4)	
Oct 19	Cuyahoga Seniors International	South Carolina	200,000	(United States) Butch Baird (1)	
Oct 26	Pepsi Senior Challenge	Georgia	250,000	(Australia) Bruce Crampton (5)	New tournament
Nov 2	Seiko-Tucson Senior Match Play Championship	Arizona	300,000	(United States) Don January (21)	
Nov 9	Las Vegas Senior Classic	Nevada	250,000	(Australia) Bruce Crampton (6)	New tournament
Nov 23	Shearson-Lehman Brothers Senior Classic	Florida	200,000	(Australia) Bruce Crampton (7)	New tournament

== Money list ==
The money list was based on prize money won during the season, calculated in U.S. dollars.

Position	Player	Prize money ($)
1	(Australia) Bruce Crampton	454,299
2	(United States) Chi-Chi Rodríguez	399,172
3	(United States) Dale Douglass	309,760
4	(United States) Don January	299,795
5	(South Africa) Gary Player	291,190

== Awards ==
Award	Winner	Ref.
Scoring leader (Byron Nelson Award)	(United States) Chi-Chi Rodríguez	
