= Dale Douglass =

American professional golfer (1936–2022)

Personal information
- Full name: Dale Dwight Douglass
- Nationality: United States
- Born: March 5, 1936 Wewoka, Oklahoma, U.S.
- Died: July 6, 2022 (aged 86) Scottsdale, Arizona, U.S.
- Height: 6 ft 2 in (1.88 m)
- Weight: 170 lb (77 kg; 12 st)

Career
- Sport: Golf
- College: University of Colorado
- Turned professional: 1960
- Former tours: Champions Tour; PGA Tour
- Professional wins: 21

Number of wins by tour
- PGA Tour: 3
- PGA Tour Champions: 11
- Other: 3 (regular); 4 (senior)

Best results in major championships
- Masters Tournament: T19: 1969
- PGA Championship: T17: 1975
- U.S. Open: T13: 1969
- The Open Championship: T32: 1970

Dale Dwight Douglass (March 5, 1936 – July 6, 2022) was an American professional golfer who won tournaments at both the PGA Tour and the Champions Tour level.

== Early life ==
Douglass was born in Wewoka, Oklahoma. He grew up in Fort Morgan, Colorado, where he graduated from high school in 1956. In 1959, Douglass graduated from University of Colorado.

== Professional career ==
In 1960, Douglass turned pro. In 1963, He joined the PGA Tour. He played on the 1969 Ryder Cup team.

Douglass won three times and earned $573,351 in just under 25 years on the PGA Tour. His best finish in a major championship was T-13 at the 1969 U.S. Open. His fortunes improved dramatically when he reached the age of 50 and joined the Senior PGA Tour. In this venue, Douglass had 11 wins including the 1986 U.S. Senior Open and accumulated approximately $7 million in earnings.

== Personal life ==
Douglass lived in Paradise Valley, Arizona. He died in Scottsdale, Arizona, on July 6, 2022, at the age of 86.

== Professional wins (21) ==
=== PGA Tour wins (3) ===
No.	Date	Tournament	Winning score	Margin of victory	Runner(s)-up
1	Apr 20, 1969	Azalea Open Invitational	−9 (70-70-66-69=275)	3 strokes	(United States) Jim Langley, (United States) Larry Mowry, (United States) Bob Stone, (United States) Terry Wilcox
2	Jun 22, 1969	Kemper Open	−14 (69-70-68-67=274)	4 strokes	(United States) Charles Coody
3	Jan 18, 1970	Phoenix Open Invitational	−13 (71-66-68-66=271)	1 stroke	(United States) Howie Johnson, (United States) Gene Littler

PGA Tour playoff record (0–3)

No.	Year	Tournament	Opponent(s)	Result
1	1968	Sahara Invitational	(United States) Chi-Chi Rodríguez	Lost to par on first extra hole
2	1970	Greater Jacksonville Open	(United States) Don January	Lost 18-hole playoff; January: −3 (69), Douglass: E (72)
3	1971	Kemper Open	(South Africa) Gary Player, (United States) Lee Trevino, (United States) Tom Weiskopf	Weiskopf won with birdie on first extra hole

=== Other wins (3) ===
- 1965 Arizona Open
- 1978 Jerry Ford Invitational (tie with Ed Sneed)
- 1983 Colorado PGA Championship

=== Senior PGA Tour wins (11) ===
Legend
Senior major championships (1)
Other Senior PGA Tour (10)

No.	Date	Tournament	Winning score	Margin of victory	Runner(s)-up
1	Mar 23, 1986	Vintage Invitational	−16 (67-70-69-66=272)	4 strokes	(South Africa) Gary Player
2	Mar 30, 1986	Johnny Mathis Seniors Classic	−14 (67-69-66=202)	3 strokes	(United States) Chi-Chi Rodríguez
3	Jun 29, 1986	U.S. Senior Open	−5 (66-72-68-73=279)	1 stroke	(South Africa) Gary Player
4	Oct 12, 1986	Fairfield Barnett Classic	−13 (68-67-68=203)	1 stroke	(United States) Miller Barber
5	Feb 21, 1988	GTE Suncoast Classic	−6 (67-69-74=210)	2 strokes	(United States) Orville Moody
6	May 27, 1990	Bell Atlantic Classic	−4 (70-66-70=206)	Playoff	(South Africa) Gary Player
7	Aug 11, 1991	Showdown Classic	−7 (71-67-71=209)	1 stroke	(United States) George Archer, (United States) Don Bies
8	May 31, 1992	NYNEX Commemorative	−7 (67-66=133) (Note: Shortened to 36 holes due to weather.)	Playoff	(United States) Terry Dill
9	Jul 19, 1992	Ameritech Senior Open	−15 (65-70-66=201)	4 strokes	(United States) Jim Dent
10	Oct 24, 1993	Ralphs Senior Classic	−17 (66-66-64=196)	Playoff	(United States) Jim Dent
11	Jun 23, 1996	Bell Atlantic Classic (2)	−4 (69-69-68=206)	Playoff	(United States) John Schroeder, (United States) Tom Wargo

Senior PGA Tour playoff record (4–4)

No.	Year	Tournament	Opponent(s)	Result
1	1986	Del E. Webb Senior PGA Tour Roundup	(United States) Charles Owens	Lost to par on second extra hole
2	1990	Bell Atlantic Classic	(South Africa) Gary Player	Won with par on second extra hole
3	1990	Fairfield Barnett Space Coast Classic	(United States) Mike Hill	Lost to par on first extra hole
4	1990	New York Life Champions	(United States) Mike Hill, (United States) Lee Trevino	Hill won with birdie on first extra hole
5	1992	NYNEX Commemorative	(United States) Terry Dill	Won with par on first extra hole
6	1993	Ralphs Senior Classic	(United States) Jim Dent	Won with birdie on first extra hole
7	1994	The Tradition	(United States) Raymond Floyd	Lost to birdie on first extra hole
8	1996	Bell Atlantic Classic	(United States) John Schroeder, (United States) Tom Wargo	Won with birdie on third extra hole

=== Other senior wins (4) ===
- 1990 Liberty Mutual Legends of Golf (with Charles Coody)
- 1994 Liberty Mutual Legends of Golf (with Charles Coody)
- 1998 Liberty Mutual Legends of Golf (Legends Division with Charles Coody)
- 1998 Liberty Mutual Legends of Golf (Legendary Division with Charles Coody)

== Results in major championships ==
Tournament	1965	1966	1967	1968	1969
Masters Tournament					T19
U.S. Open			CUT	CUT	T13
The Open Championship					
PGA Championship	T43		T45		T48

Tournament	1970	1971	1972	1973	1974	1975	1976	1977	1978	1979
Masters Tournament	T38	T27								
U.S. Open	CUT	T42			T18	T24			T24	T32
The Open Championship	T32									
PGA Championship			T40			T17				

Tournament	1980	1981	1982	1983	1984	1985	1986	1987
Masters Tournament								
U.S. Open	CUT							T31
The Open Championship								
PGA Championship								

Did not play

CUT = missed the half-way cut
"T" = tied

== Senior major championships ==
=== Wins (1) ===
Year	Championship	Winning score	Margin	Runner-up
1986	U.S. Senior Open	−5 (66-72-68-73=279)	1 stroke	(South Africa) Gary Player

== Legacy ==
- Dale Douglass Classic, annual golf tournament held at the Fort Morgan golf course.
- Dale and Joyce Douglass Scholarship

== U.S. national team appearances ==
Professional

- Ryder Cup: 1969 (tie, cup retained)

== See also ==
- List of golfers with most PGA Tour Champions wins
