= Sleepy Hollow Country Club =

Country club in Briarcliff Manor, New York

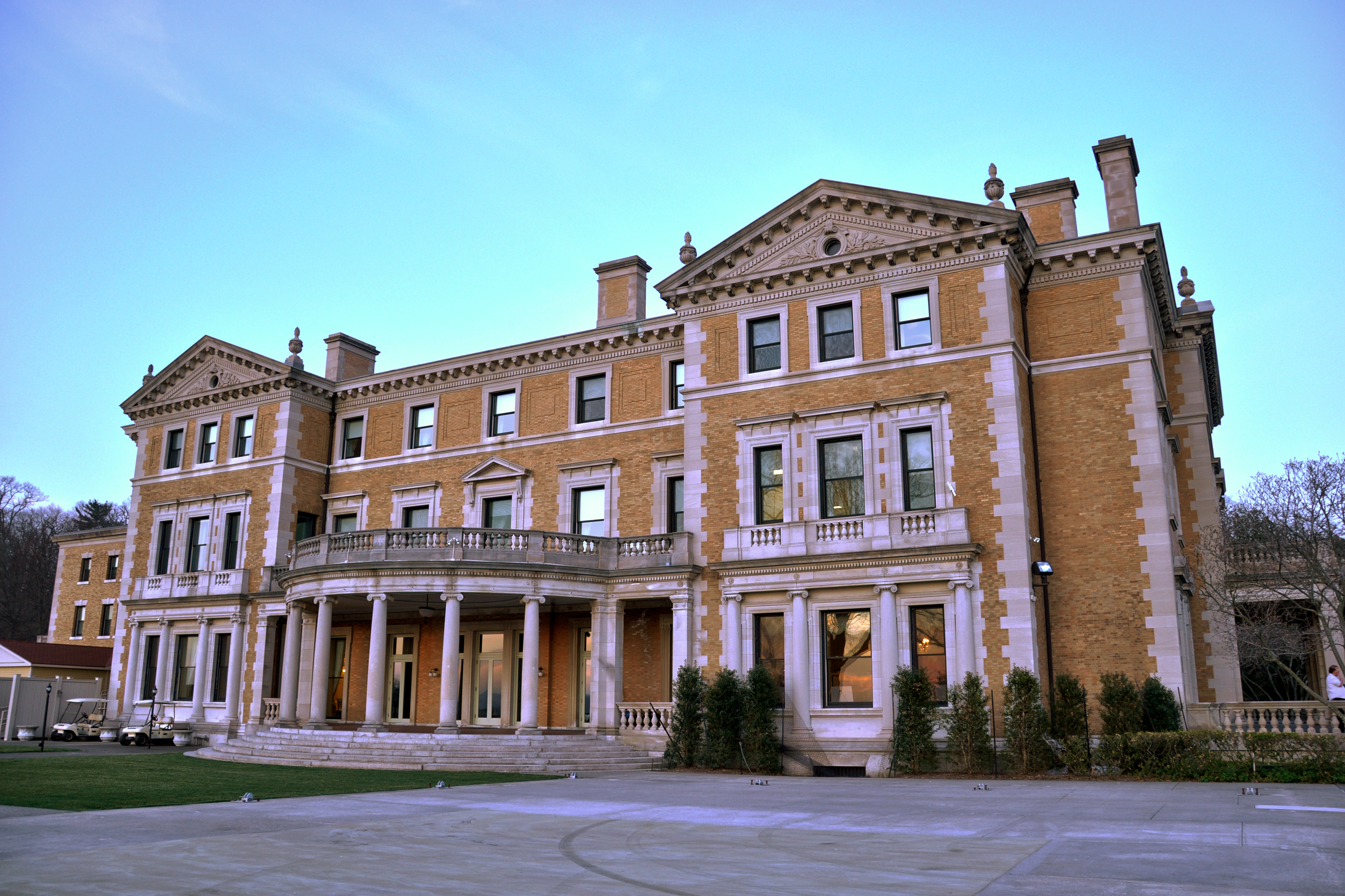
- Interactive map of Sleepy Hollow Country Club

Club information
- Established: 1911
- Type: Private
- Total holes: 27
- Website: sleepyhollowcc.org
- Sleepy Hollow Country Club
- U.S. Historic district – Contributing property
- Location within New York

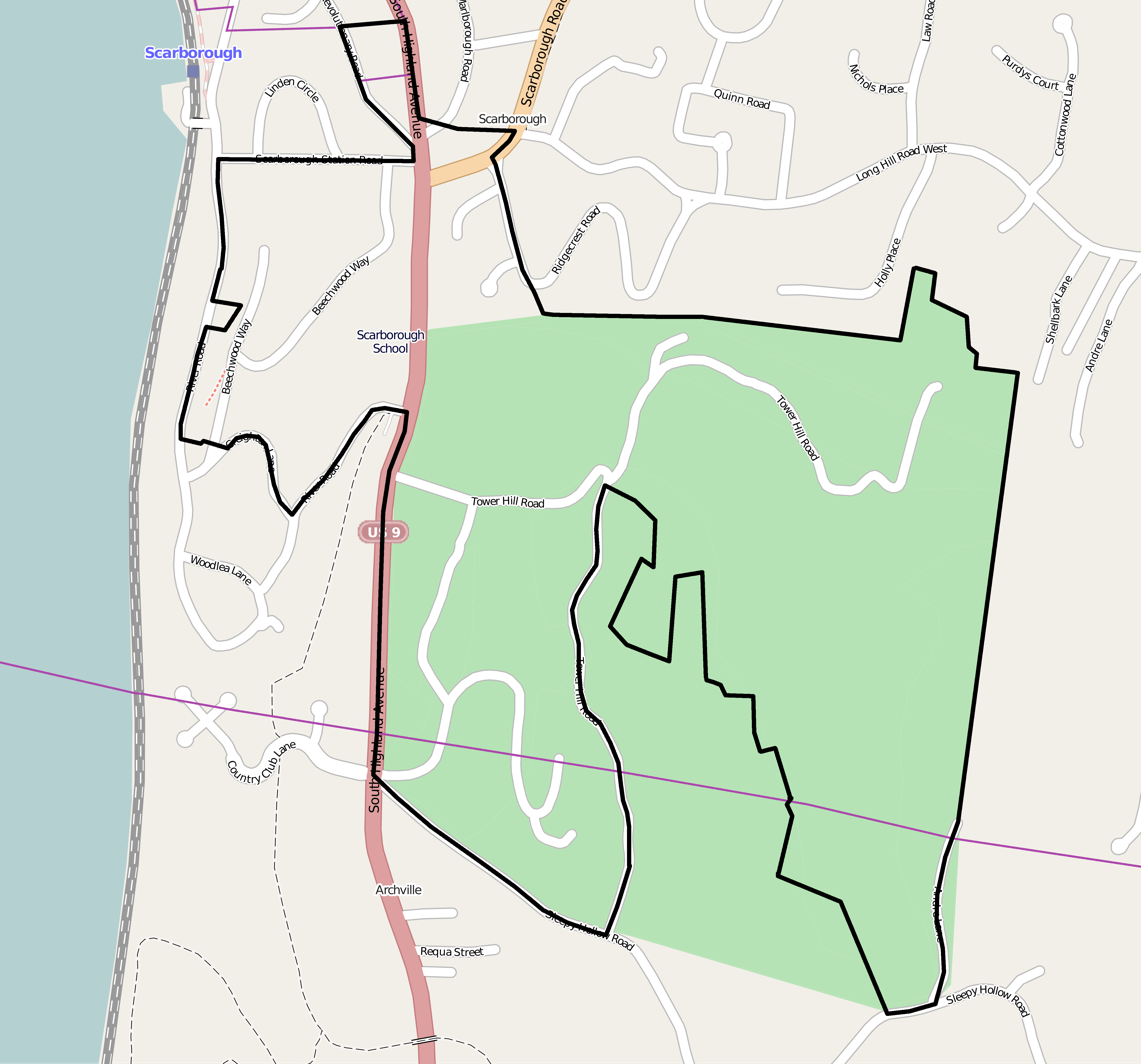
- Map of the Scarborough Historic District; country club land is green
- Location: 777 Albany Post Road (US 9), Scarborough, New York 10510
- Coordinates: 41°07′34.8″N 73°51′14.7″W
- Area: 338 acres (0.5 sq mi)
- Built: 1892–5
- Architect: McKim, Mead & White (Mead supervising)
- Architectural style: Italian Renaissance Revival
- Part of: Scarborough Historic District (ID84003433)
- Added to NRHP: September 7, 1984

Sleepy Hollow Country Club is a historic country club in Scarborough-on-Hudson in Briarcliff Manor, New York. The club was founded in 1911, and its clubhouse was known as Woodlea, a 140-room Vanderbilt mansion owned by Colonel Elliott Fitch Shepard and his wife Margaret Louisa Vanderbilt Shepard. It was built in 1892–95 at a cost of $2 million ($71.7 million in 2025) and was designed by the architectural firm McKim, Mead & White; the estate became a contributing property to the Scarborough Historic District (on the National Register of Historic Places) in 1984.

Woodlea's exterior was designed in an Italian Renaissance Revival style, incorporating Beaux-Arts details. The building's facades are composed primarily of buff-colored Italian brick. The south and west facades are symmetrical, but the overall plan of the house is not. The house's west facade is the longest and most ornate, and has a view of the Hudson River from its west-facing windows and adjoining terrace. The main entrance is on the building's south, directly approached from the south drive. The interior also has significant features, including marble fireplaces, coffered ceilings, and extensive carved wood and plaster detail. The house has between 65,000 and 70,000 square feet (6,039 and 6,503 m^{2}) of interior space, making it one of the largest privately owned houses in the United States.

== Club ==
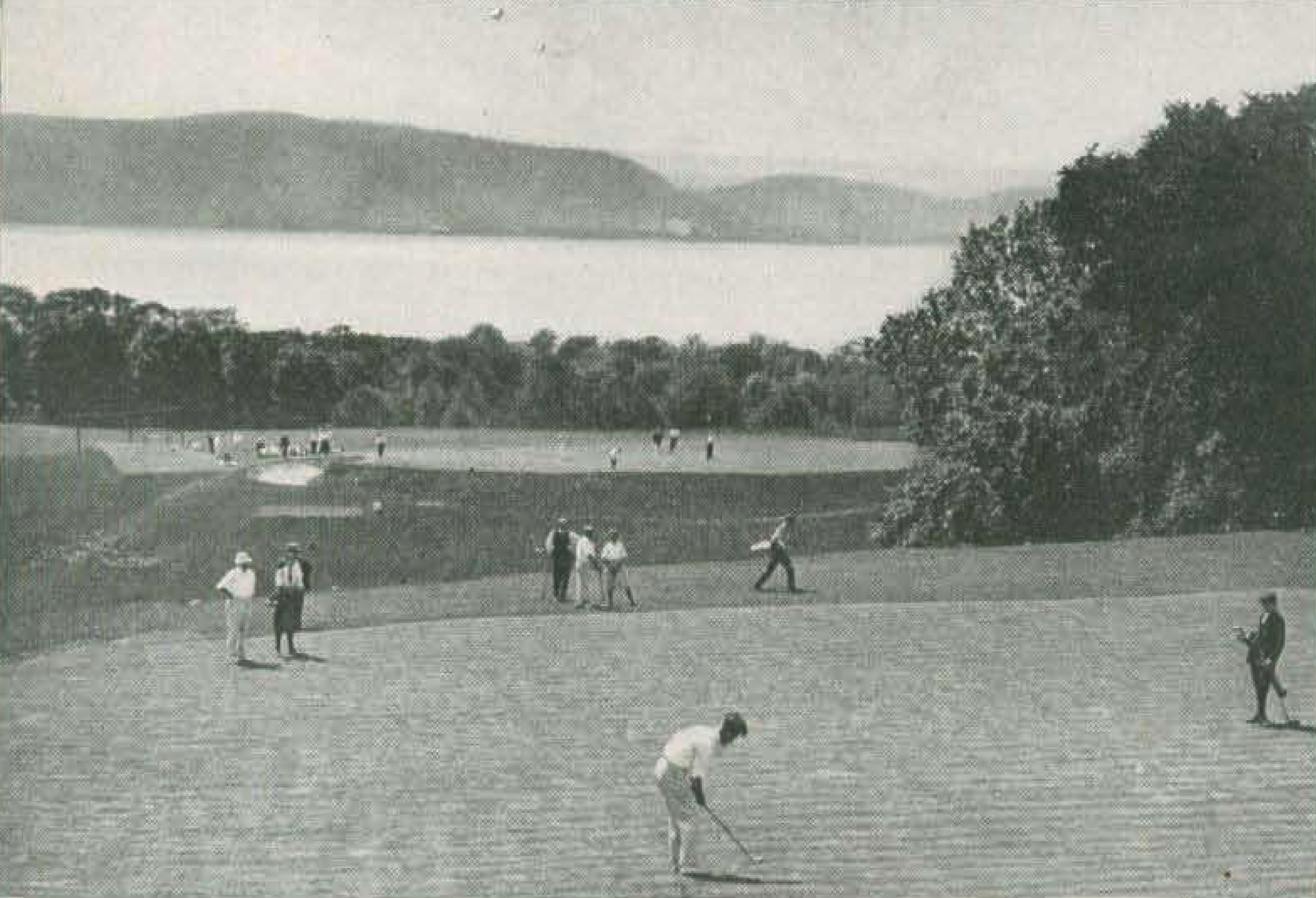
Golfing at the club, c. 1920

The club currently has 338 acres (0.5 sq mi) and a 27-hole golf course with tree-limb footbridges. Facilities include the main clubhouse, a pool complex, ten Har-Tru tennis courts, four aluminum heated platform tennis courts, four squash courts, eighteen guest rooms, skeet and trap areas, a 45-horse boarding facility, twenty paddocks, a large indoor riding arena, pro shops for golf and paddle sports, a fitness complex, the golf course and practice range (non-contributing), outdoor riding rings, stables, and a carriage house. Youth activities include golf, tennis, squash and riding. The clubhouse has three dining rooms, and altogether the club can hold 400 guests.

The club currently has 570 members, and a staff consisting of 60 year-round employees and 200 during the height of the season. The stables have a tack room, fifty stalls, and two indoor arenas, and they host the Sleepy Hollow Stable and Riding Academy. The club's gross revenue is $12 million; of it, $2.5 million is from food and beverage sales. The club property surrounds Saint Mary's Episcopal Church on three sides and slopes upwards east from U.S. Route 9. The clubhouse, which is open through every season of the year, sits on a wide central plateau. Notable early members included George G. Haven, V. Everit Macy, George W. Perkins, Moses Taylor, Oakleigh Thorne, and Frank Vanderlip; notable current members include Bill Murray, James Patterson, and several members of the Rockefeller family.

== History ==
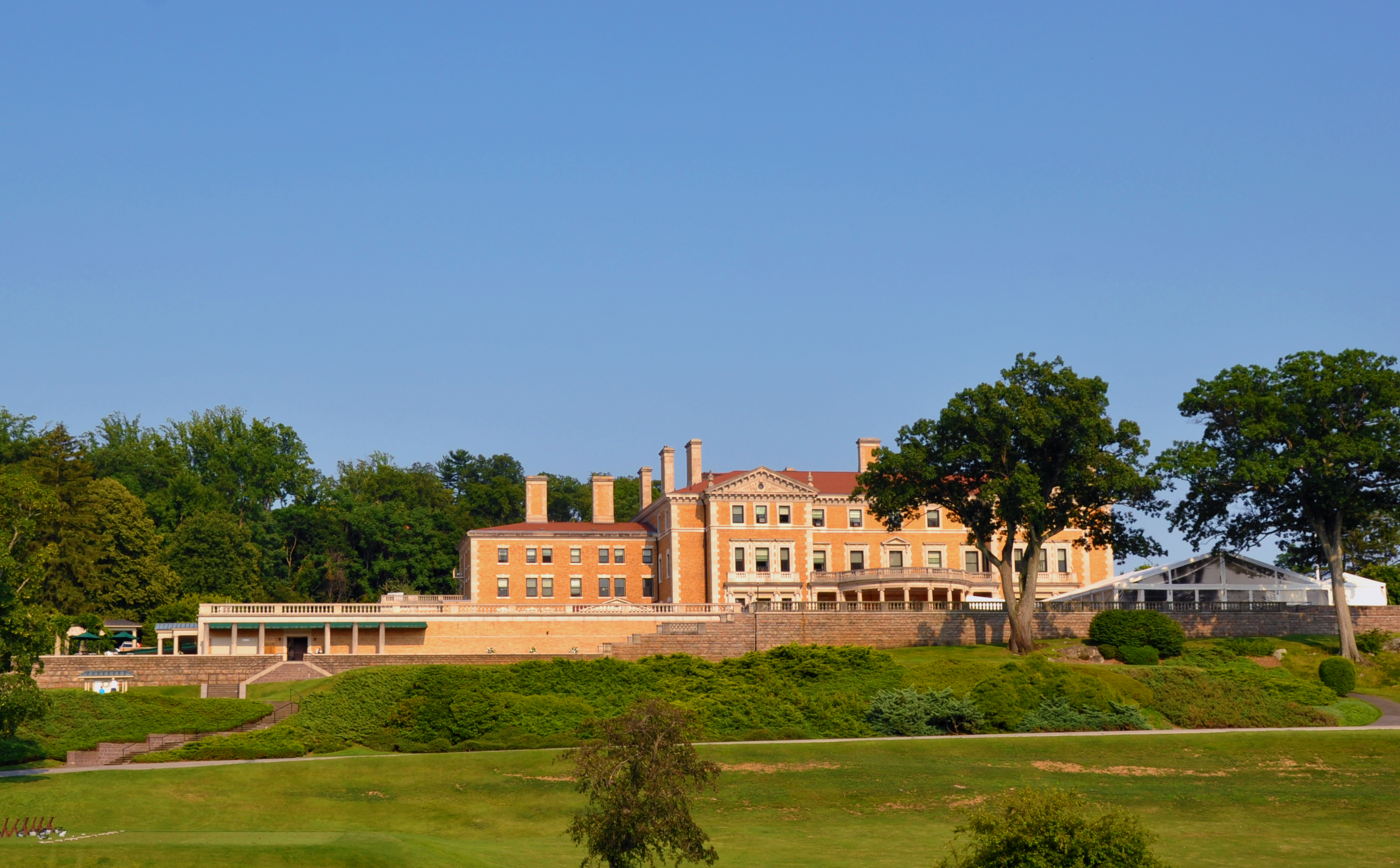
Woodlea's riverfront facade

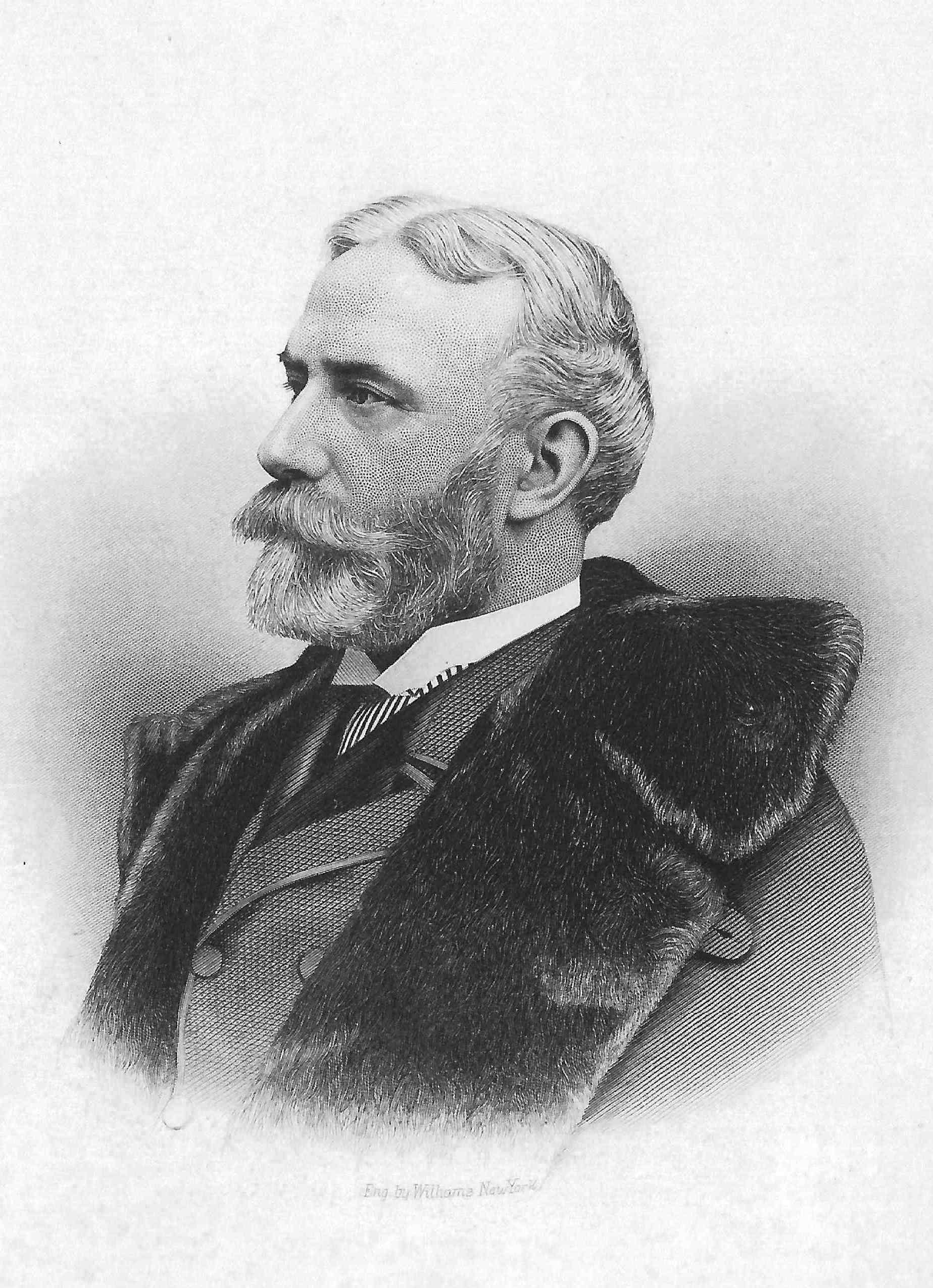
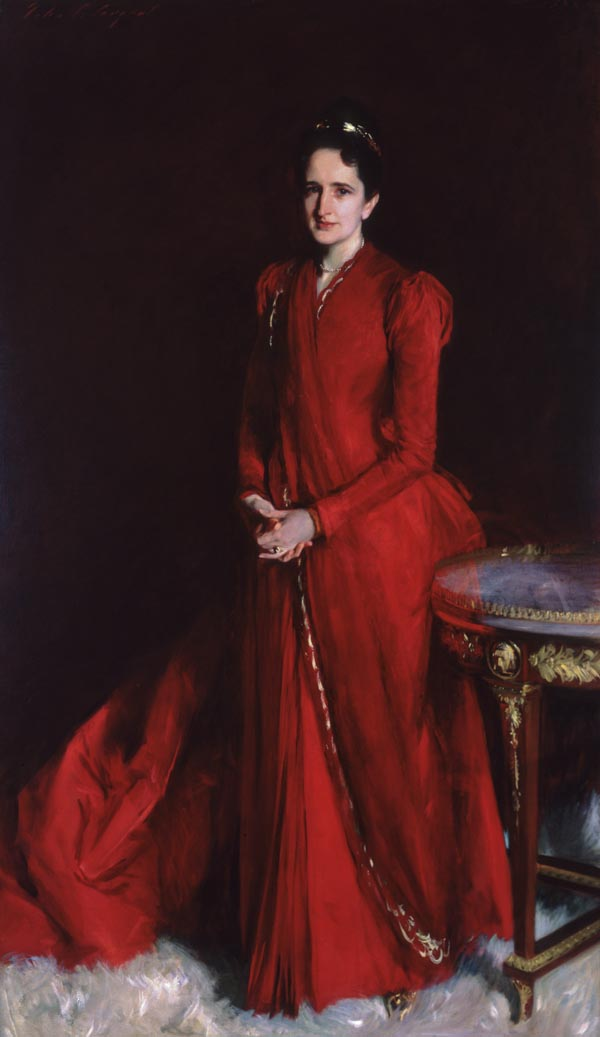
Elliott and Margaret Louisa Vanderbilt Shepard

=== Name ===
Sleepy Hollow Country Club, founded in 1911, predates the 1996 renaming of the neighboring village of North Tarrytown to Sleepy Hollow. The club is named after its location in the river valley of the Pocantico River, a river which was once called Slapershaven ("sleepers' harbor" in Dutch); the Dutch name later grew to apply to the valley. Today, as a geographic term, "Sleepy Hollow" refers only to the incorporated village.

=== 19th century ===
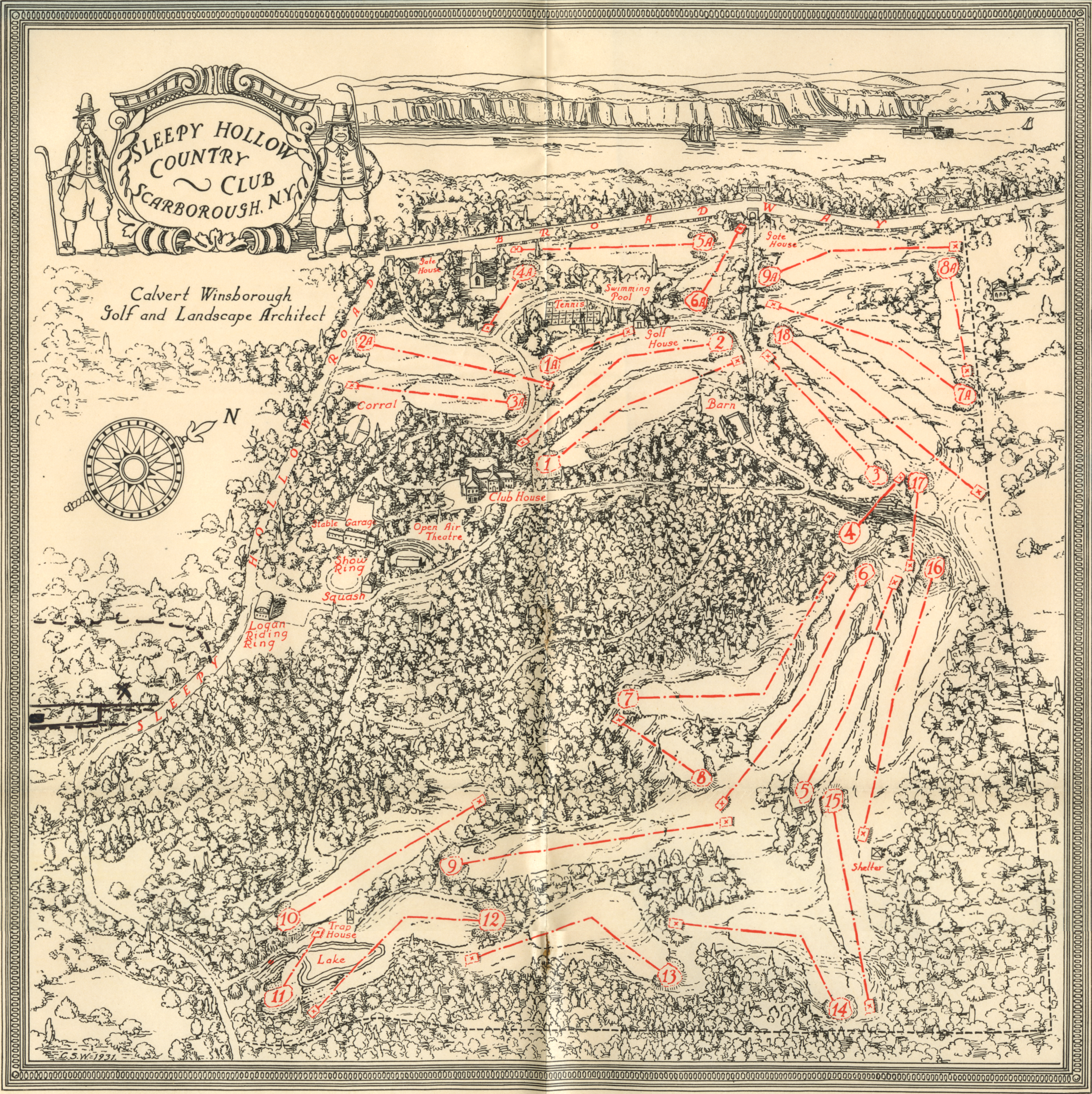
Map of the country club, 1931

Sleepy Hollow's clubhouse was once a private residence named Woodlea. The mansion retained the name of a former house of J. Butler Wright (son of Benjamin Wright), who lived there and called it Woodlea; it dates to around 1806. Wright's Victorian house, of painted brick with porches and a high tower on one end, was later renamed the Villa. The current property was originally made up of various farms. Colonel Elliott Fitch Shepard came to the Briarcliff area in the early 1890s, and having purchased the house and its 500-acre (0.8 sq mi) property, ordered construction of the existing house and improvements to the grounds. Construction on the mansion began in 1892, and it was completed in 1895. In 1892 Shepard ordered the construction of Scarborough's first dock (at the present Scarborough Park) to allow construction materials to be shipped to his property. Shepard died in 1893, leaving his wife Margaret to oversee the completion of Woodlea. After his death, Margaret lived there only during spring and autumn, with less frequent trips as time went on. In November 1896, Maria Louisa Kissam (Margaret's mother and widow of William Henry Vanderbilt) died in the house. Maria's sister and Margaret called for a Scarborough doctor who was unable to assist her.

On September 11, 1906, New York businessman Archibald S. White purchased the then-250-acre (100 ha) property from Mrs. Shepard for between $1 and 1.5 million. He bought it as a present for his wife Olive Celeste Moore White; together they lived on the property. The house and property's worth at the time was estimated between $4 and 6 million, and it was often said that its owners didn't know how much money had been spent constructing and improving the estate. Around 1910, Frank Vanderlip and William Rockefeller purchased the estate. Vanderlip thought of it as too big of a bargain to pass up – it was offered for only $165,000 ($5,701,300 in 2025). Narcissa Vanderlip thought the house too large and grand to live in, and so the Vanderlip family remained in their nearby property of Beechwood.

=== 20th century to the present ===
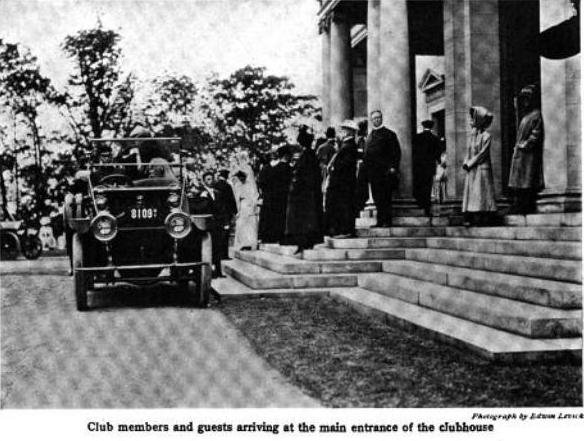
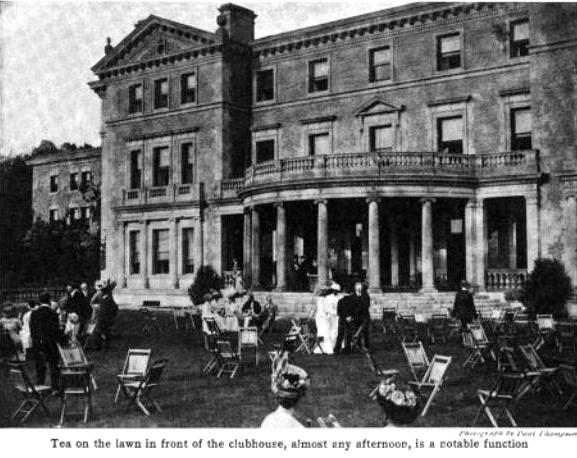
The clubhouse's south entranceway and west facade, 1914

The two men assembled a board of directors to form a country club, including future Titanic victim John Jacob Astor IV, coal baron Edward Julius Berwind, cotillion leaders Elisha Dyer and Lispenard Stewart, and sportsmen W. Averell Harriman, Cornelius Vanderbilt III, and Harrison A. Williams. (Note: Other sources list other men, including Cornelius Vanderbilt, V. Everit Macy, and Edward Harden; James Stillman and Oliver Harriman, uncle of E. H. Harriman; and George W. Perkins and Samuel Sloan.) The country club was incorporated on May 11, 1911, with 600 members. The directors' first meeting took place at Vanderlip's office at 55 Wall St., the National City Bank Building (Vanderlip was the president of the bank at the time). Initiation and yearly dues were each $100 ($3,500 in 2025). For the first few years, the club rented Woodlea for $25,000 ($863,800 in 2025) a year, and in 1912 the club purchased the property from Vanderlip and Rockefeller for $350,000 ($11,676,700 in 2025).

The club then constructed the golf course in close harmony to the existing lawns, and also built an outdoor garden theater with clipped cedars and a 16th-century Italian portal. The club ended up paying $310,000 for the land and house, and spent another $100,000 on improvements. The club spent four years, starting in 1910, rearranging the house's kitchen, pantries, and service wing to house and serve more people, and in renovating one of the stables into a garage. The club also constructed more tennis courts and a toboggan slide for use in the winter. The grounds and Italian garden had been designed by the sons of Frederick Law Olmsted from 1895 to 1901, including long stretches of lawns and using American and foreign trees; the club had Charles B. Macdonald and Seth Raynor design the first golf course in 1911, and A. W. Tillinghast designed an update in 1935, succeeded by Gil Hanse's redesign from 18 to 27 holes around 2008.

In 1916, golf course architect Devereux Emmet and his son Devereux Emmet Jr. won the father-son tournament at Sleepy Hollow Country Club. This prompted the United States Golf Association to institute the "architects rule" that barred golf course architects from competing as amateurs in tournaments.

In 1917 the club had 1,000 members, and its president was Frank Vanderlip. In June of that year, William Rockefeller purchased 387 acres (0.6 sq mi) for the club, bringing its area to 480 acres (0.8 sq mi) (the house was originally sold with only 93 acres (0.1 sq mi)). Rockefeller spent $600,000 ($15,077,900 in 2025), making it the largest single real estate transaction in the county. The purchases allowed for the construction of about 40 houses on the club property. New facilities were built in the 1920s, including a manager's house, skeet house, squash house, indoor riding ring, and swimming pool. The club had operated at a loss from the beginning, and after the Wall Street Crash of 1929, club members were not successful in maintaining their wealth, and membership declined. Cuts were made – horses were sold, Woodlea was closed except for special occasions, and the golf house became the primary clubhouse. 5-acre (0.008 sq mi) building lots north of Woodlea were sold to members. In 1933, notable amateur golfer Bobby Jones played at the course. The club was also not successful during World War II and later; in 1950 a member could stay overnight at Woodlea for $5 ($67 in 2025), and for less in the golf house. The first formal dance that year also cost $5 a person. In 1961, in time for the club's 50th anniversary, Woodlea was redecorated with more modern fabrics, warm gold and forest green carpets, dropped lighting, and some lowered ceilings.

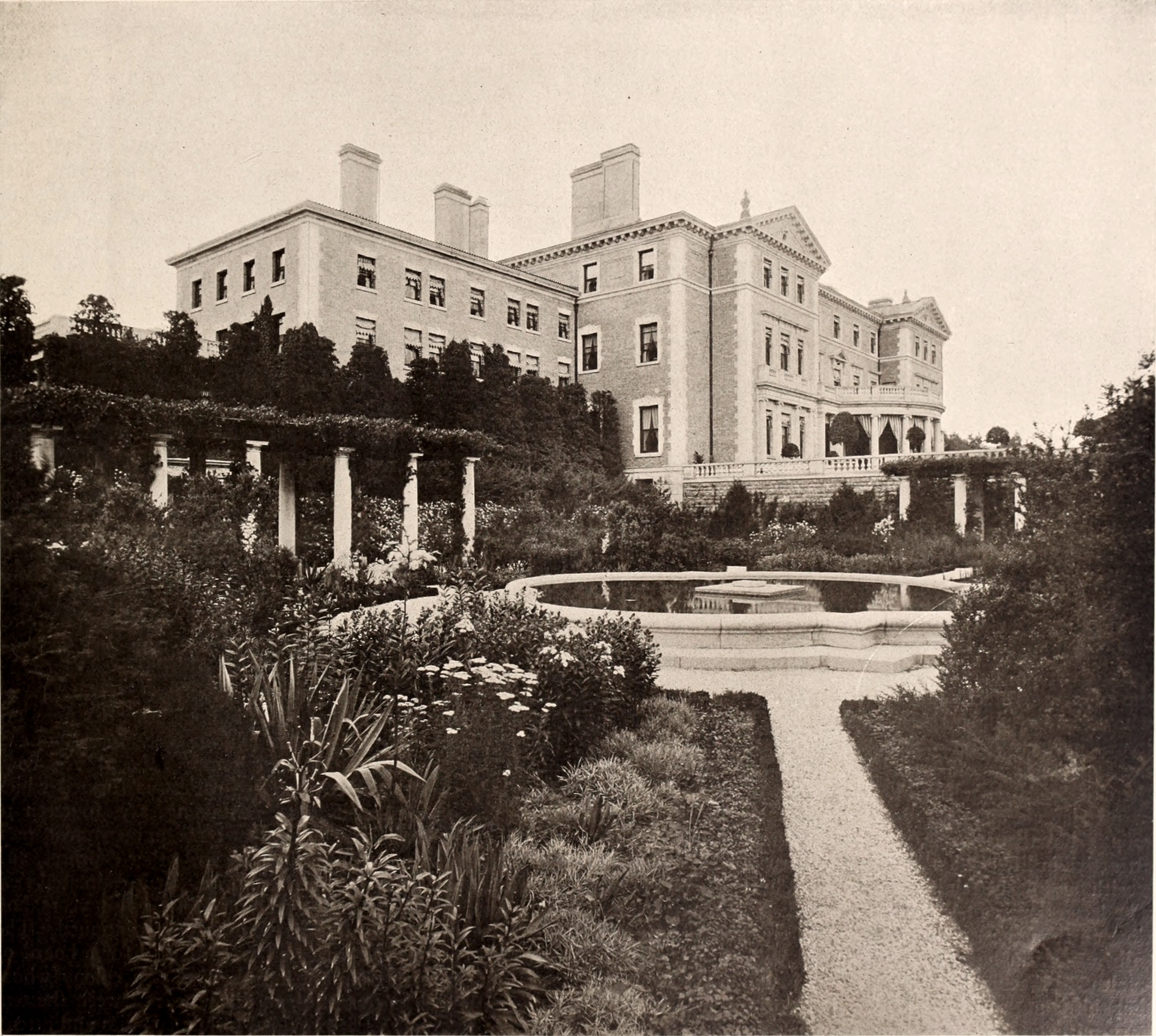
Hillside Italian garden, c. 1906

Original to the house, and occupying its northwest terrace against its service wing, was an Italian garden with vine-clad pergolas on each side, symmetrical gravel paths, marble benches, and long stone balustrades, giving it characteristics of a hanging garden. The garden was below the house's first floor, and was built against the hillside, occupying a portion of the slope that falls far below it. The lower walls of the house were screened with a row of large cedars planted on the highest part of the garden. The garden formed an immense rectangular space, and on the four sides of the terrace there were pergolas thickly overgrown with vines. In the center was a pool and a carved stone fountain imported from Rome. Walks and beds of flowers and shrubbery occupied the rest, visible from the west-facing windows of the house.

The garden was demolished in the 1960s, as was the golf house (in 1967). In the garden's location and replacing the use of the golf house, a wing was added to the clubhouse, constructed on the northeast terrace and completed in 1962. The building holds a pro shop, dining facilities, and locker rooms. The structure was designed to be spacious and convenient and not be noticeable from the grounds below, although from Woodlea, the sight of the tar roof and ventilators was noted to be worse than the prior standing gardens. The club hosted the NYNEX Commemorative from 1986 to 1993. In 1989, professional golfer Bob Charles set a current record when he won the tournament. In 2002, the club hosted the U.S. Women's Amateur Golf Championship.

In 2014 the country club expanded and renovated the snack bar building, renovated the locker room building exterior, constructed a large array of solar panels on the roof of the locker room and dining facility building, and performed other renovations. Replacing the golf house's location, a pool facility and tennis shop was constructed in 1968.

== Architecture ==
=== Woodlea ===
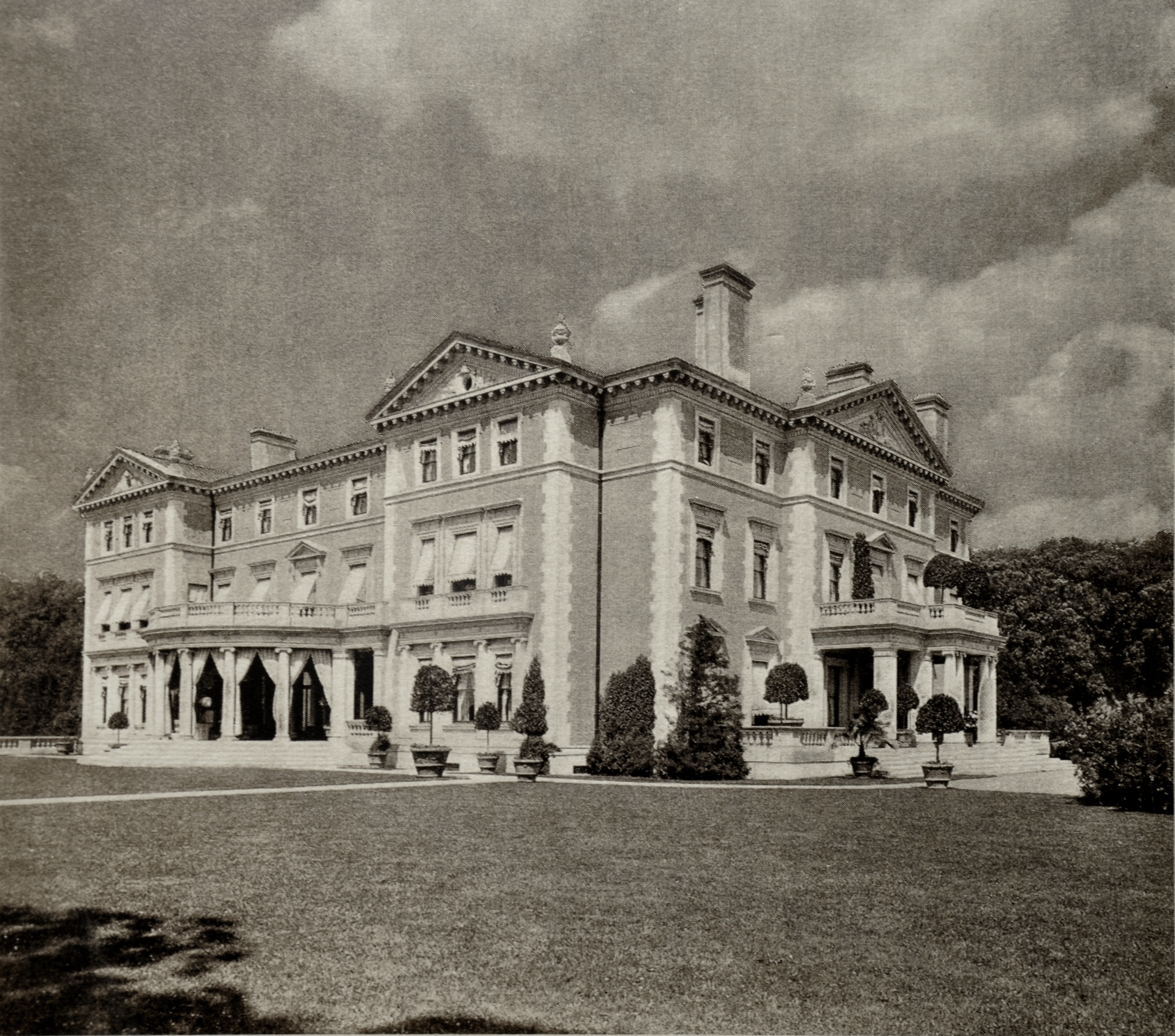
Southwest view, 1895

The architect of Woodlea is variously stated as McKim, Mead & White, and Stanford White, although according to William Mitchell Kendall in his 1920 list of the firm's works, he attributes the house's design to McKim, Mead & White, with W. R. Mead as the supervising architect. Mead was rarely involved in architectural design in the partnership, making his design of Woodlea and another Vanderbilt house, Florham, unusual. He was related to Shepard, as Mead's sister was married to Shepard's brother.

==== Exterior ====
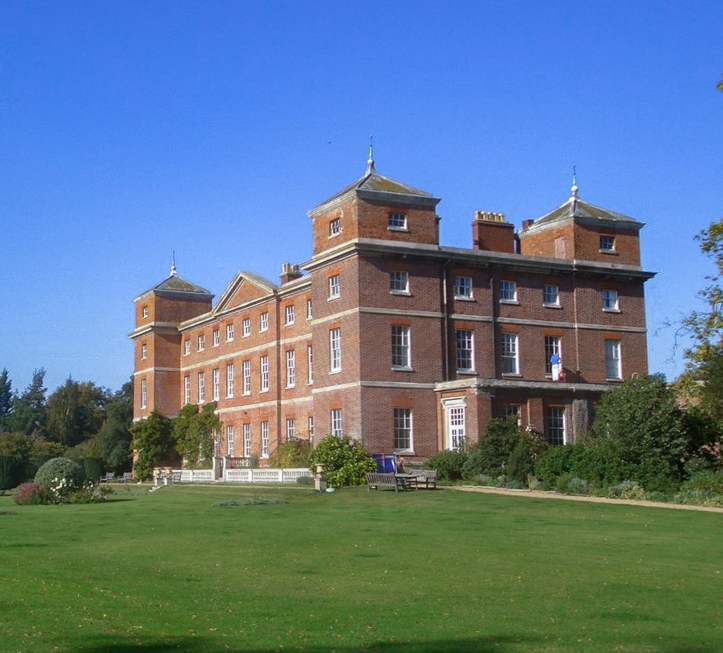
Kimberley Hall in Norfolk likely served as a model for Woodlea

Woodlea's exterior was designed in an Italian Renaissance Revival style. The house is said to have been modeled after Kimberley Hall in Kimberley, Norfolk. Its classical devices of 18th-century English architecture include urns, pediments, columns, and balusters. The house also is a full-blown expression of the American Renaissance. Woodlea incorporates characteristics of the Beaux-Arts style of architecture – the exterior dictates the use of the interior, with family and guest rooms on the third floor. At the north end of the house, situated farthest from the main entrance, and of a size larger than most houses, is the service wing, which contains the servant quarters. Compared to the rest of the house, this wing has lower ceilings, smaller windows, and less exterior trim. In the early 1900s, the wing was clad in ivy.

Woodlea is constructed of buff-colored pressed Italian brick with pale limestone trim. It is three stories tall, seven bays wide, and more than fourteen bays deep. The south and west facades are both symmetrical, although the house has an asymmetrical overall plan. The house has pedimented pavilions and entrance porticos on the west, south, and east; window trim consisting of stone surrounds, pediments, lintels, and sills; classical balusters and quoins. The house's third story is separated visually by a stone string course and is topped with a modillioned cornice. From a shallow hipped roof rise brick chimneys that are trimmed and capped with stone. The pavilion pediments have decorative urn-shaped elements. The house's windows are primarily rectangular, double hung, one-over-one panel style, except for a large triple Palladian window, which has stained glass and is situated midway up the house's main staircase, illuminating its lower steps. The house has distinctive quoins, pediments, and classical balustrades of pale gray limestone.

The west facade of the house is the most ornate, and faces the Hudson River, with a view of the river from its terrace and west-facing windows. The curtain wall between the facade's pavilions contains a semicircular portico, and its entablature is upheld by Ionic columns, and supports a balustrade. A flight of semicircular steps descends to the terrace. The river front is parallel with the east front, which had a porte-cochère, a minor entrance, and a service entrance. The main entrance is at the building's south, directly approached by the south drive. The entrance is recessed, with a portico of Ionic columns over the entranceway.

The house has been described as "low and spreading, notwithstanding its unusual height". It has between 65,000 and 70,000 square feet (6,000 and 6,500 m^{2}), making it one of the largest houses in the U.S. The property has about three miles of wide driveways.

==== Interior ====
The house also has significant interior features, including marble fireplaces, wood paneling, coffered ceilings, window and door architraves, parquet floors, and extensive carved wood and plaster detail, primarily in the Adamesque mold. The original furnishings together were reported in 1895 to have cost hundreds of thousands of dollars, and to have included rare tapestries, carved woods, paintings, and Italian marble.

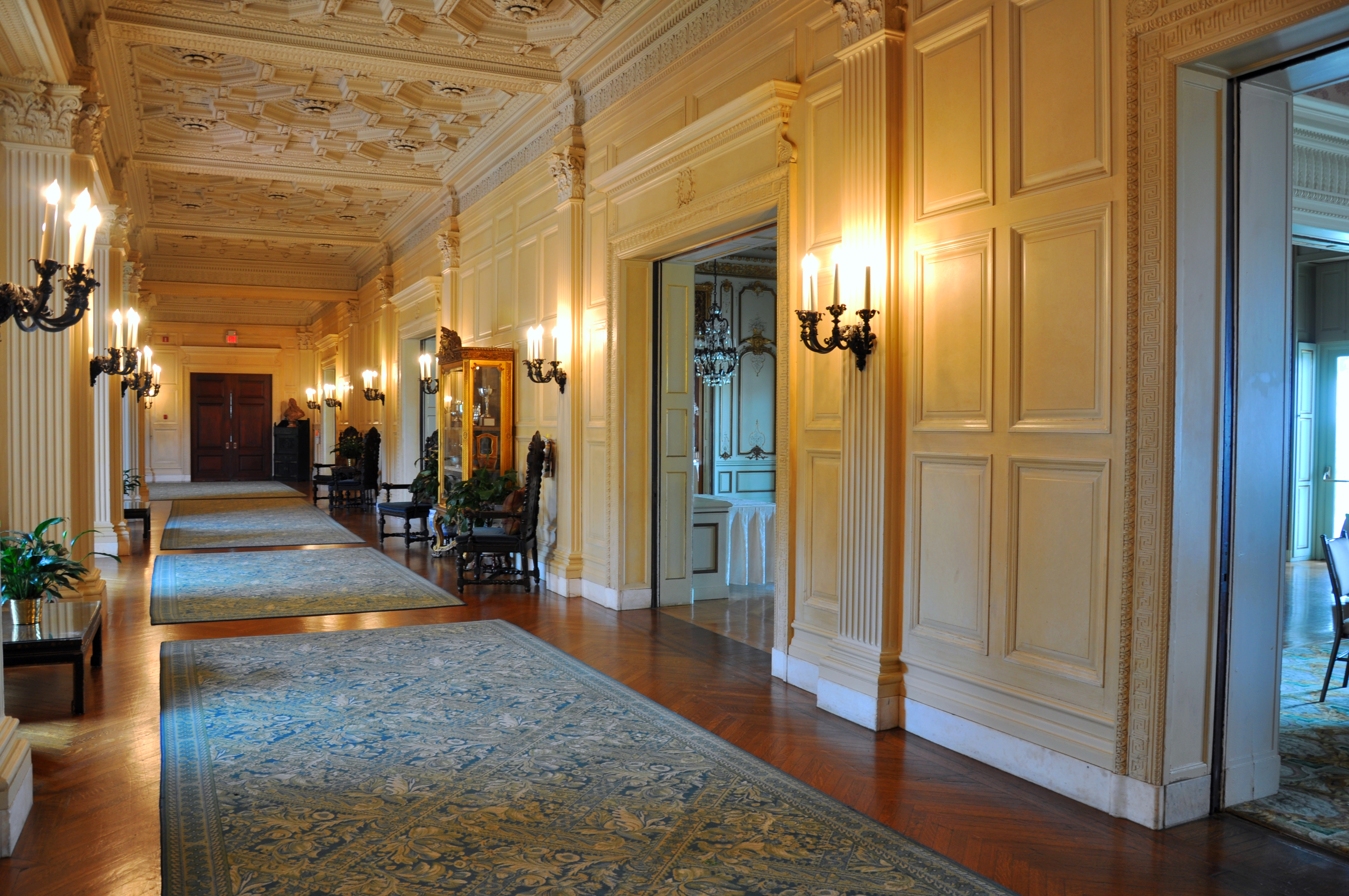
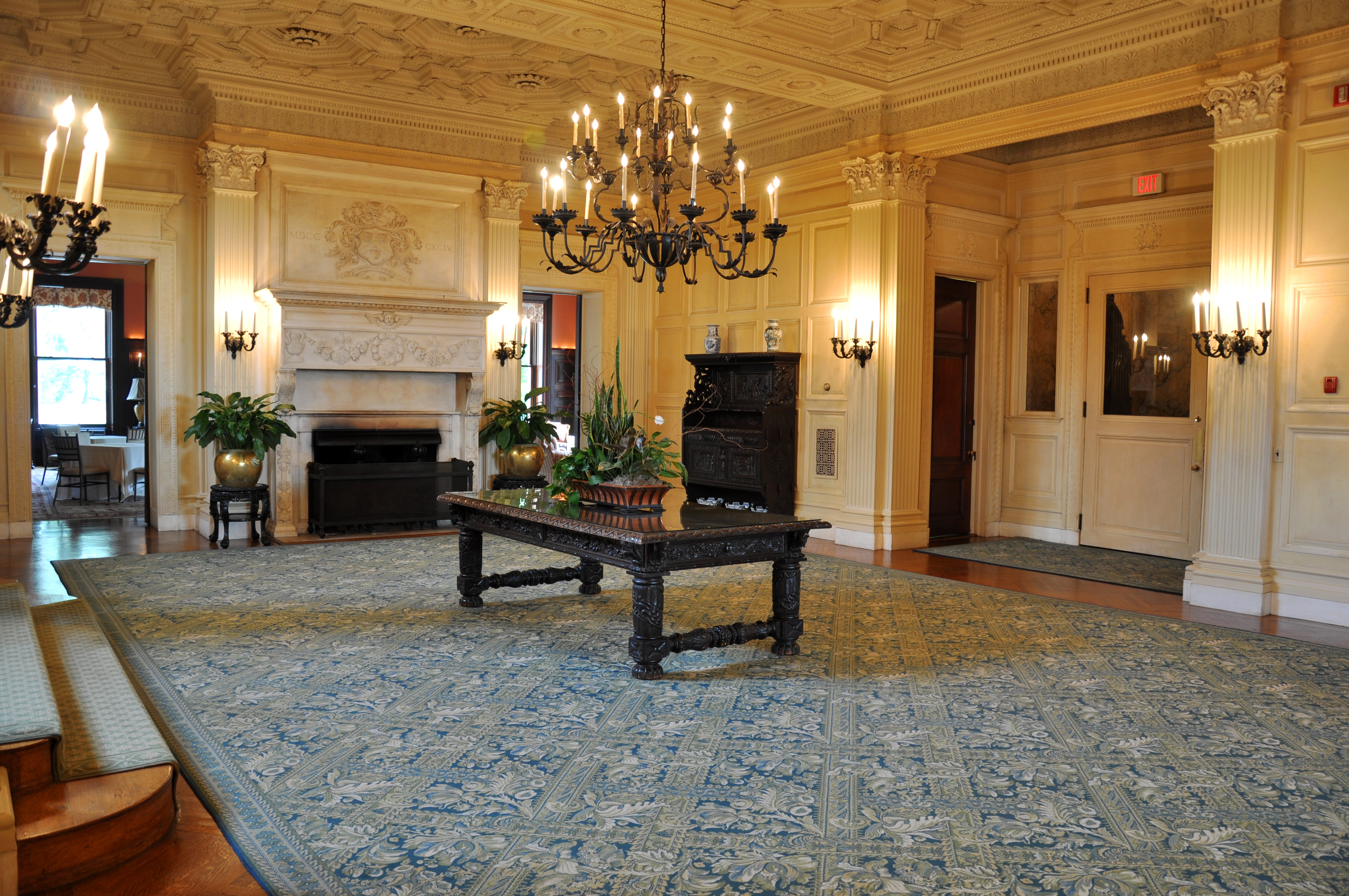
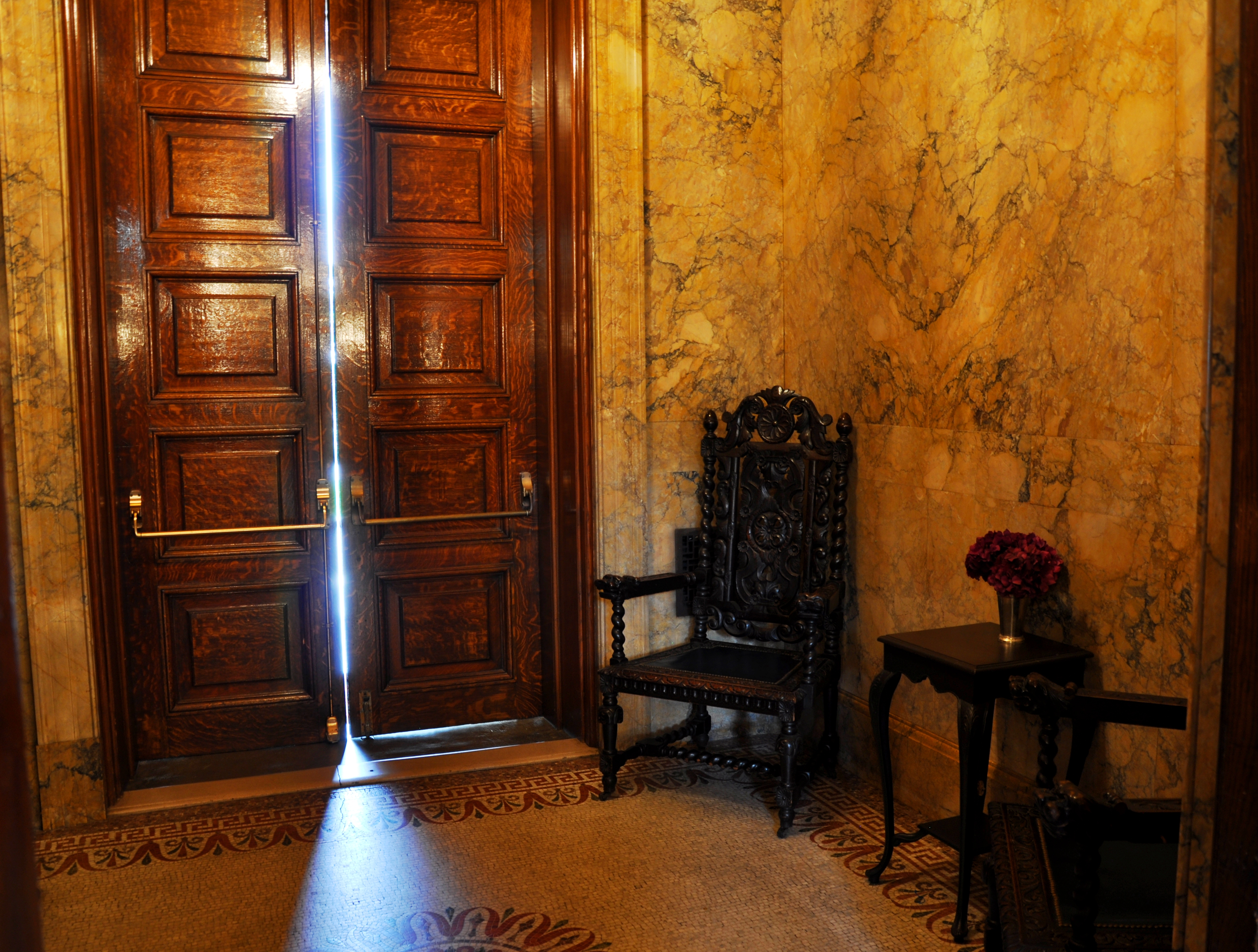
From north to south, the central corridor, main hall, and south vestibule
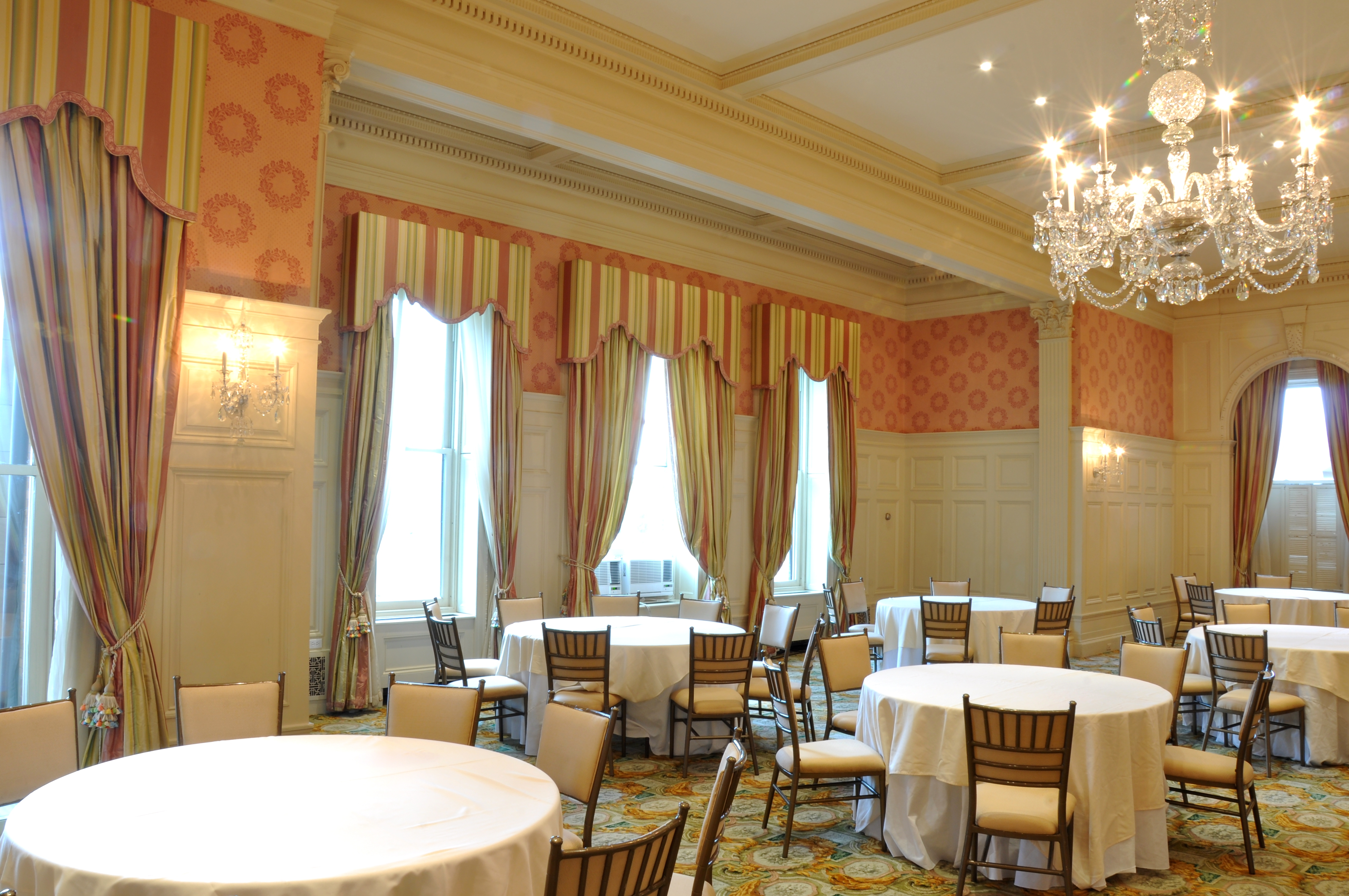
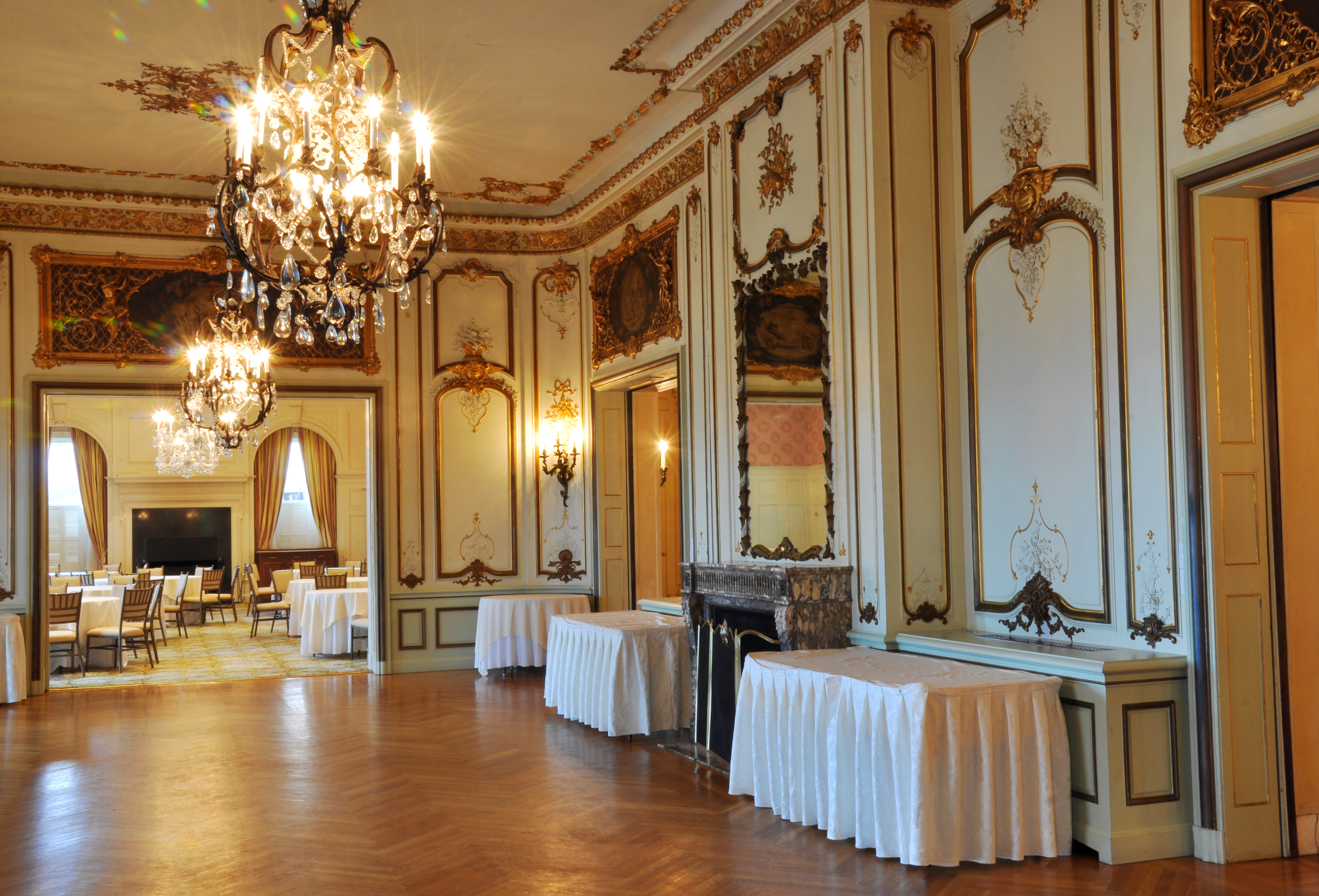
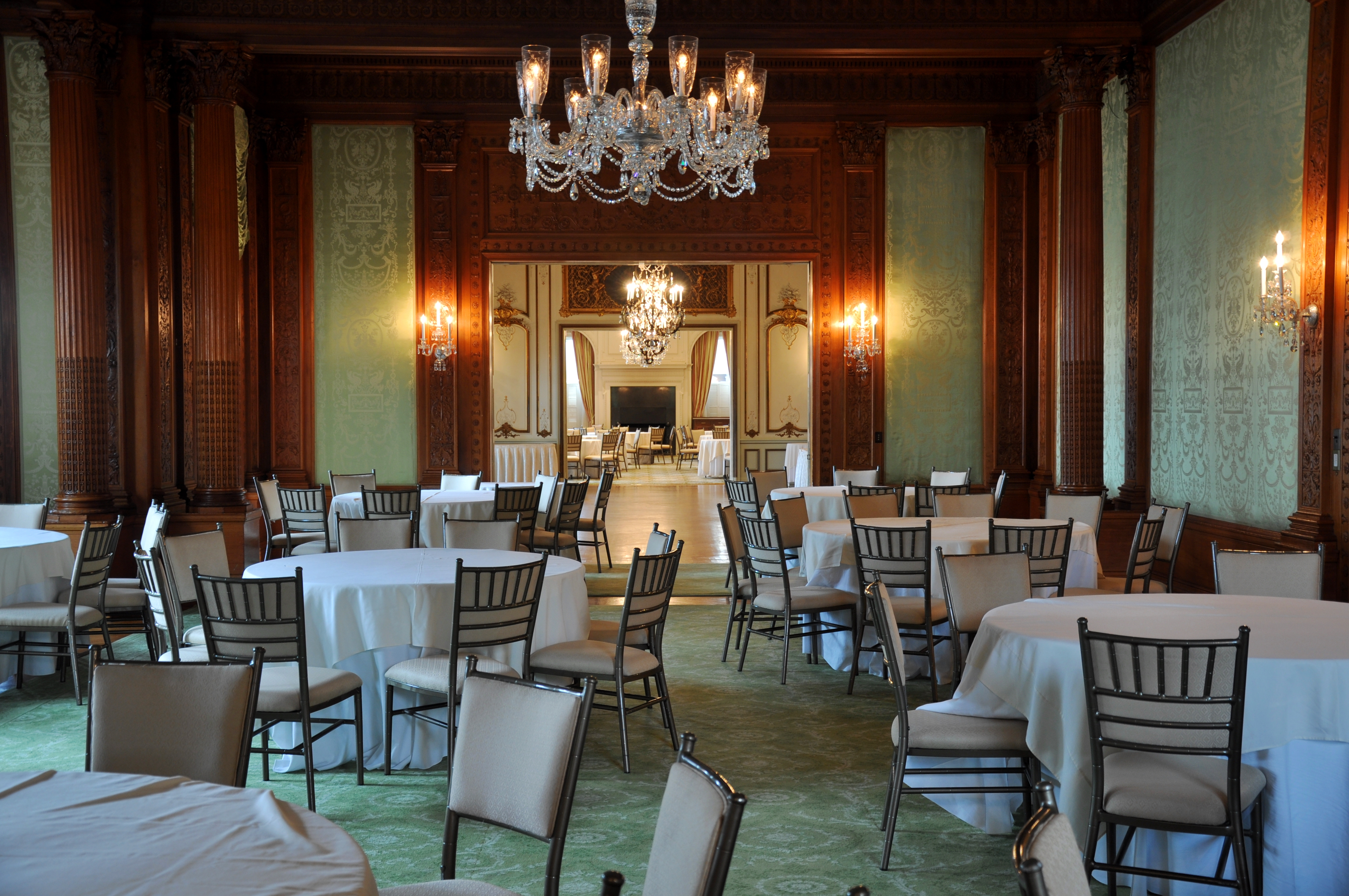
From north to south, three banquet halls
(formerly the dining room, parlor, and living room)

In 1906, the house had 16 bathrooms and 65 rooms, including 20 for servants. The house's main door opens into a square vaulted vestibule, walled throughout with highly polished yellow marble. It leads into the main hall, which is paneled to the ceiling in wood, painted white, the corners and angles accentuated by pilasters, and the rich mahogany doors encased within monumental frames. The white ceiling is intricately coffered. The hall has a large fireplace of carved white marble and a large table in the room's center, which was on a large red rug covering most of the floor. The main hall also featured Gobelins and Italian tapestries. The first floor also has an enfilade of three rooms: the green silk- and cedar-paneled living room, the white and gold drawing room, and the dark mahogany dining room. The three rooms have large doorways between them to allow hosts to combine rooms for a large event. The combined space has a span or linear distance of about 150 feet. A corridor connects the main hall to three rooms; it has recessed windows, dividing the corridor into bays. The corridor has pilasters and the same coffered ceiling of the main hall, and it used to have heavy velvet curtains at the window alcoves and entrance to the hallway; the windows had curtains of delicate salmon silk. The corridor originally displayed silk and velvet tapestries from various parts of the world.

The first room from the corridor was the living room, with a wainscot, pilasters, cornice, and door and window frames all of Spanish cedar, and a mantelpiece imported from an Italian chateau. Walls are paneled in green silk, mirroring the rug and furnishings. In its early history, the walls were inlaid with embossed Italian leather. The drawing room, sometimes referred to as the music room, salon, or parlor was at the center, with paneled walls in ivory white and gold, with gilded moldings and ornaments. There are richly interlaced panels above the doorways with paintings inserted in them. The mantle dates to around 1700, and is of mottled purple and white marble, and has a built-in mirror above it. The room has richly gilt chandeliers hanging from ornamental reliefs in the otherwise plain ceiling. Furniture was of tapestry and gold, with a light rug and yellow and gold curtains at the windows and doors.

The dining room had a high wainscot of mahogany, paneled in rectangles, above which is a broad tapestry frieze. The ceiling is beamed with closely set beams, and the cornice is mahogany like the other woodwork. The room is lighted by the cluster of lights applied to the wainscot. The house's pantry was "as large as many New York apartments", had a counter and wash bowls and large rows of glazed closets around other walls. The kitchen and serving room had a refrigerator and were well stocked and equipped. The breakfast room was green and white, with woodwork painted white and walls covered in Nile green cloth; it had a wood mantel with facings of mottled white marble, also imported from Italy. Adjoining is the morning-room, finished in quartered oak, with walls papered in red stripes of two shades, has a quartered oak wainscot and white cornice, curtains and furniture are red and gold.

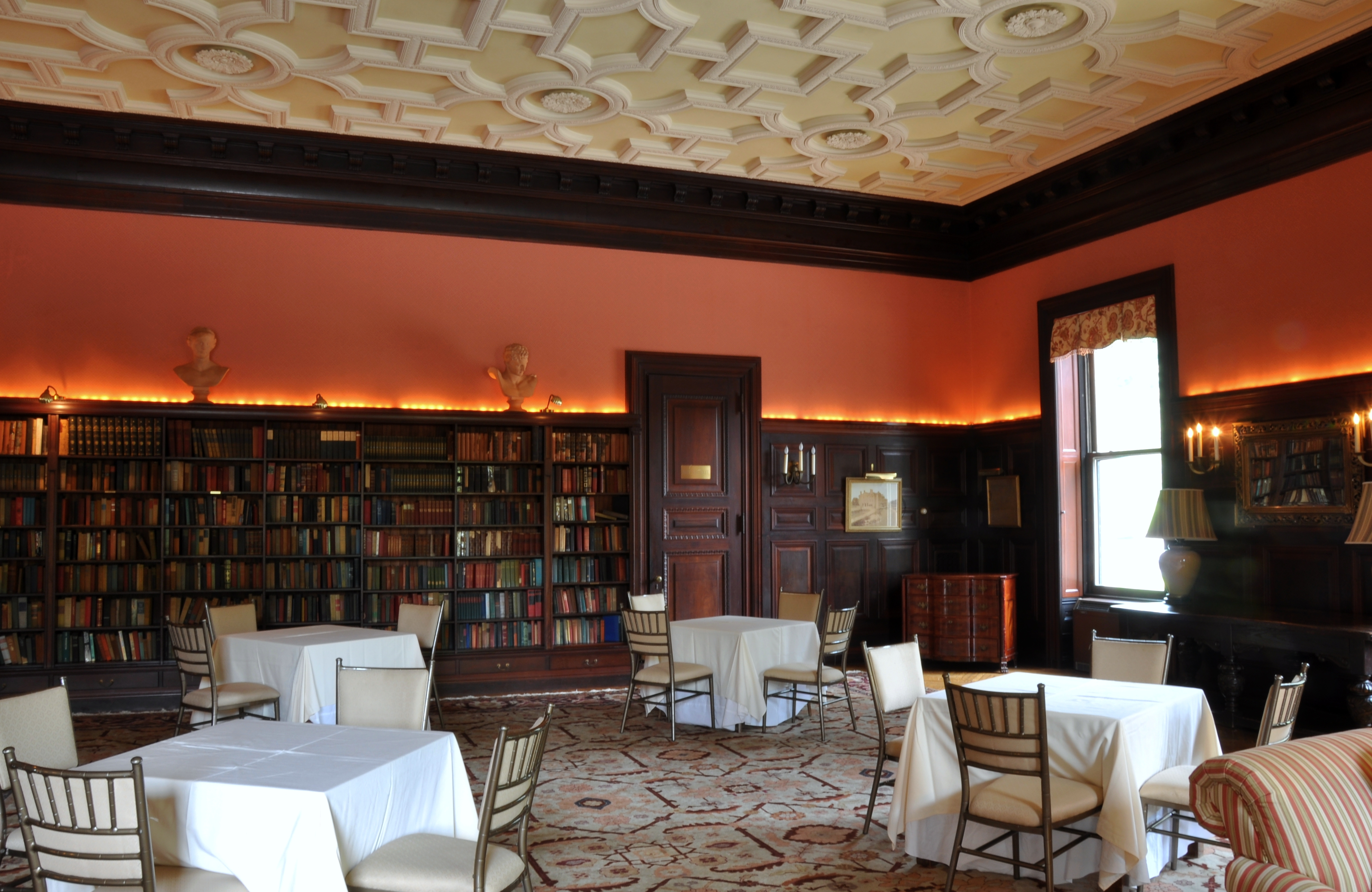
The library, currently a banquet hall

The library is on the right of the hall, removed from the other rooms; it once held a billiard table. The walls are lined with tall bookcases containing rare books; the walls were otherwise covered in large square panel-like pieces of leather. The room has a richly coffered ceiling and had green and brown curtains. The house has bedrooms of various sizes, most large, with Mrs. Shepard's the biggest. Each room has distinct furnishings and from moderate to rich decoration. One particular was the Moorish room, furnished in the Moorish style, with mantel and furniture inlaid with mother of pearl. The third floor had bedrooms, a children's suite and a large playroom.

The house's room arrangement was planned for convenience and comfort, as compared to typical English mansions, which often were built with kitchens far from the dining room. Woodlea has 140 rooms, which were designed not to be drafty, and with important rooms not too remote. The rooms are all over-scaled in terms of the height of the ceilings and size of the doors, with large fireplaces, and the length and breadth of the stairway to the house's second floor. The staircases have recesses with intricate decorative panels.

=== Stable ===
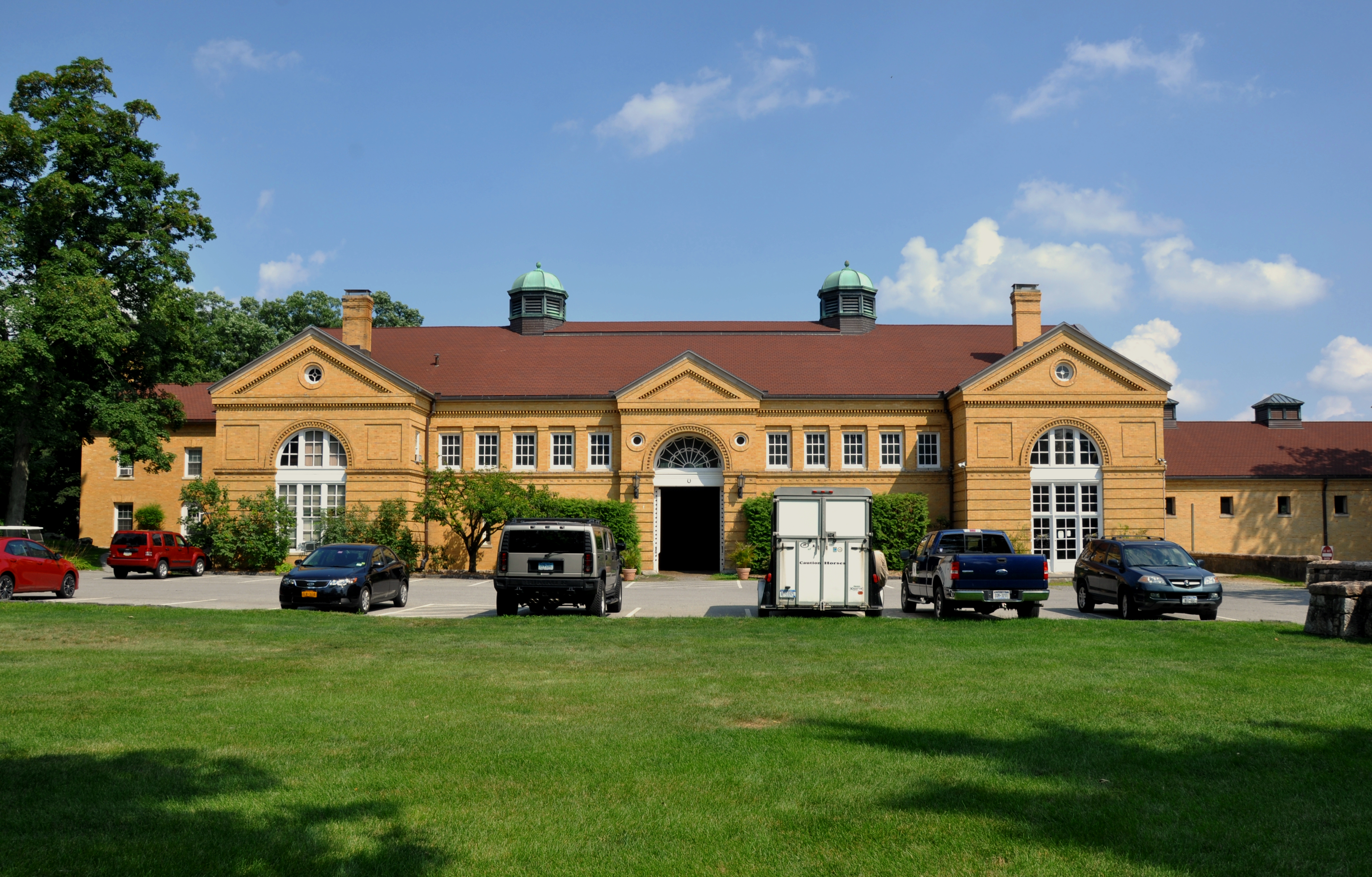
The club's stable

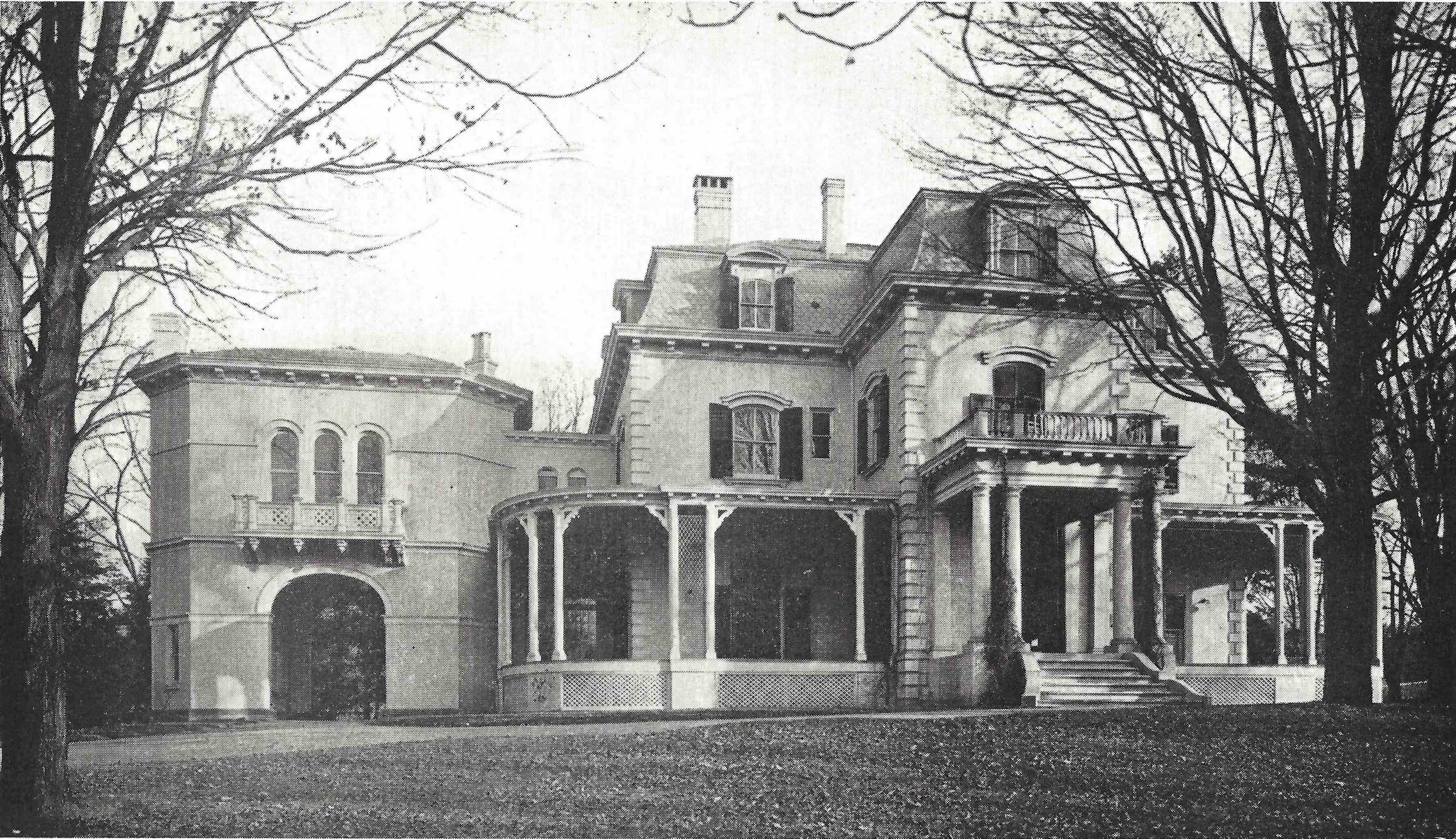
The golf and tennis house (c. 1931), originally the residence of J. Butler Wright

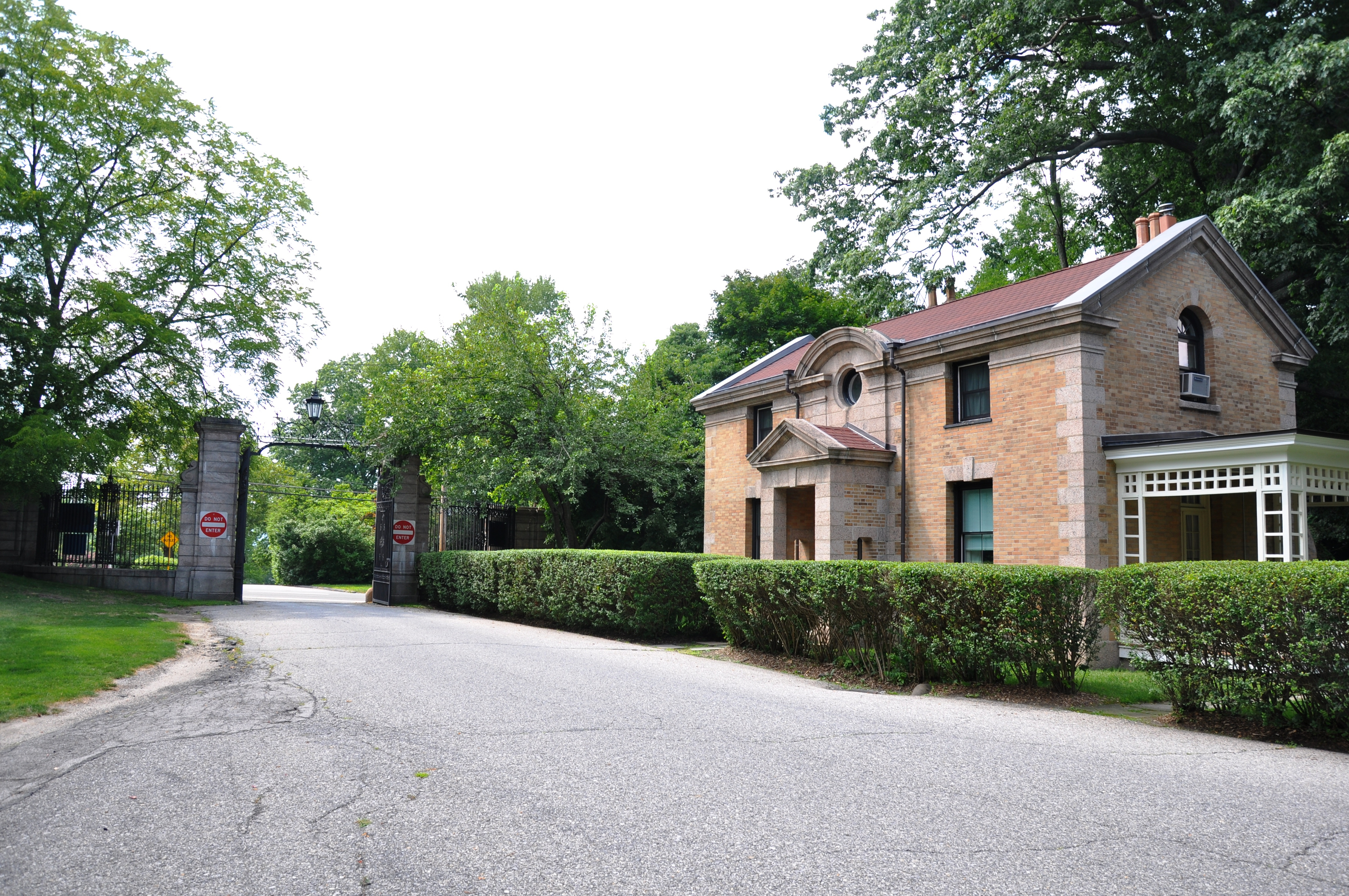
The club's entranceway and south gatehouse

The stable was designed by McKim, Mead & White and built in the late 19th century using the same yellow brick used for the main residence. The stable is two and a half stories high, 29 bays wide, and 5 bays deep, and it has a gable roof covered with asbestos shingles that replaced its original ceramic tile. On the roof's ridge sits a shallow monitor, flanked by two taller octangular monitors with louvered ventilating elements and bell-cast copper roofs.

The end bays of the west (main) facade are framed in pedimented pavilions, which have recessed brick panels above the impost line, and below it are bricks coursed to resemble rustication. One glazed roundel is at the middle of each tympanum. The pedimented central bay has an arched recessed entrance with a pair of oversized double wood doors beneath a fanlight. The arch is flanked with blind roundels above the impost line, with rustication below. The bay's tympanum is undecorated. The arch impost line continues as a belt course between the pavilions and forms the sills for recessed wood-framed, fixed-sashed, nine-light windows on the building's second level. The windows are divided by Doric pilasters.

Fenestration at the main facade's lower level is only narrow wood-framed double-hung glazed embrasures with two-over-two sash. The facades have a denticulated cornice, repeated within the pediments and arched pavilion lintels. The stable is built into a hill, and has a partial basement level with 51 stalls.

The two-story interior space on the first floor was originally used for carriages and then for automobiles, and now is used as an indoor exercising ring for the horses occupying the stalls below. In the end pavilions, there is a reception area, tack room, and small apartment designed to be occupied by the riding instructor.

=== Golf house ===
In the 1920s, the old Butler Wright house became the golf house. It was at the center of the club's sporting operations, originally holding a pro shop, dining room, bar, and bedrooms. In 1931, it was refurbished with more showers and dressing rooms, an addition to the locker room to double its space and increase the lounge space, an enlarged kitchen, a new women's locker room and sitting room, a larger dining veranda, an enclosed porch on the northwest corner of the building, and a new porch on the building's east side. The club's first pool was constructed adjoining the house in 1930, necessitating the construction of the showers and dressing rooms. The building was demolished in 1967.

=== Gatehouses ===
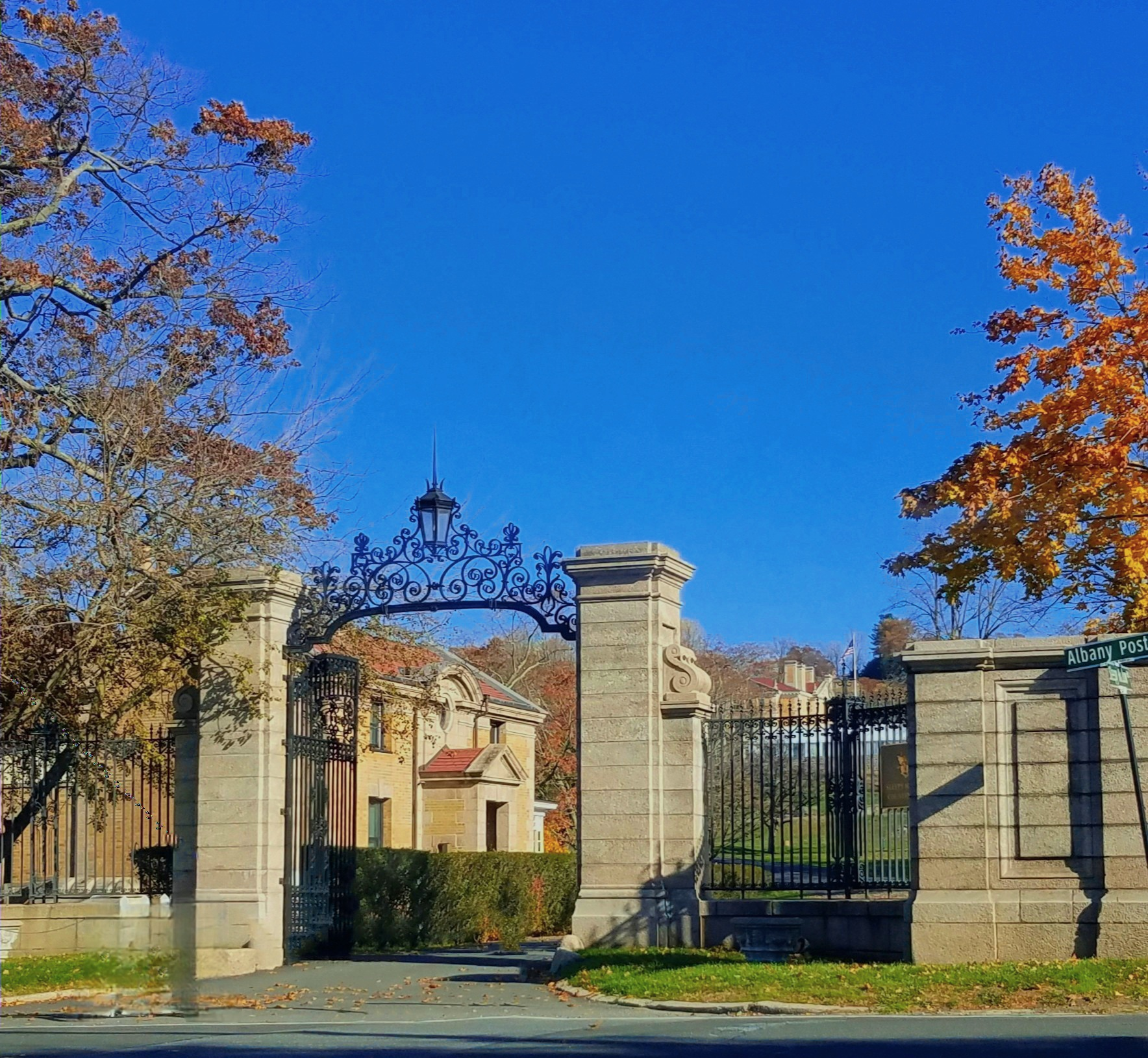
View of the gates from Albany Post Road (U.S. Route 9)

Both of the country club's Route 9 entrances have a gatehouse. Both are small, two stories high, three bays wide, and one bay deep, and were constructed along with the house in the 1890s. The gatehouses resemble Woodlea in materials and simplified stylistic detail. Both gatehouses have gable roofs and a shed-roofed one-story high rear addition. The houses have stone and brick pedimented porticos over their entranceways. The lower-level windows have flat-arched surrounds with keystones; the oculi break the cornice lines beneath segmentally arched pediments. The northern gatehouse has another one-story rear addition and a small one-car garage. The club's two tall gateways are made of French-imported carved stone and ironwork.

=== Pool house ===
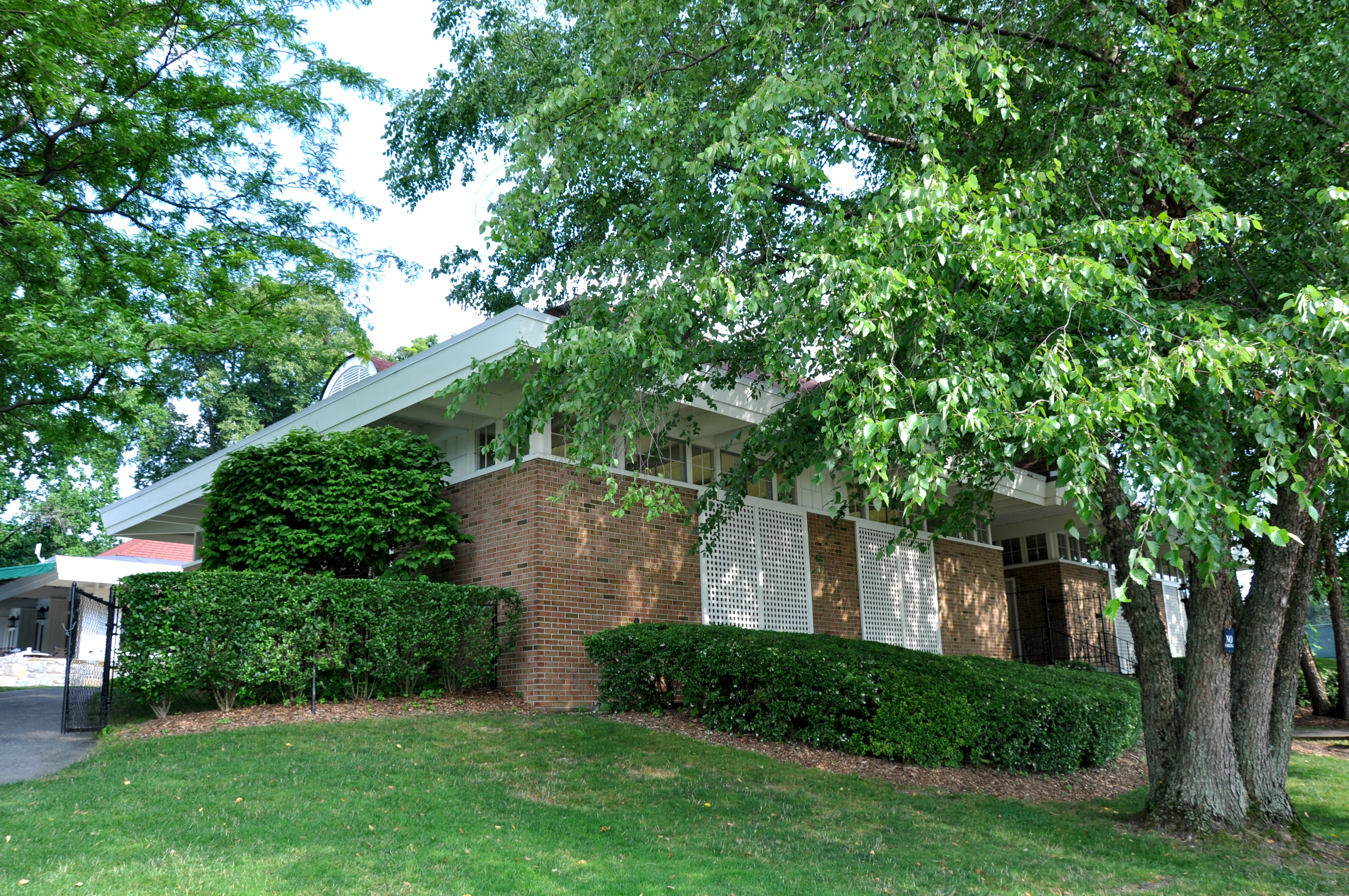
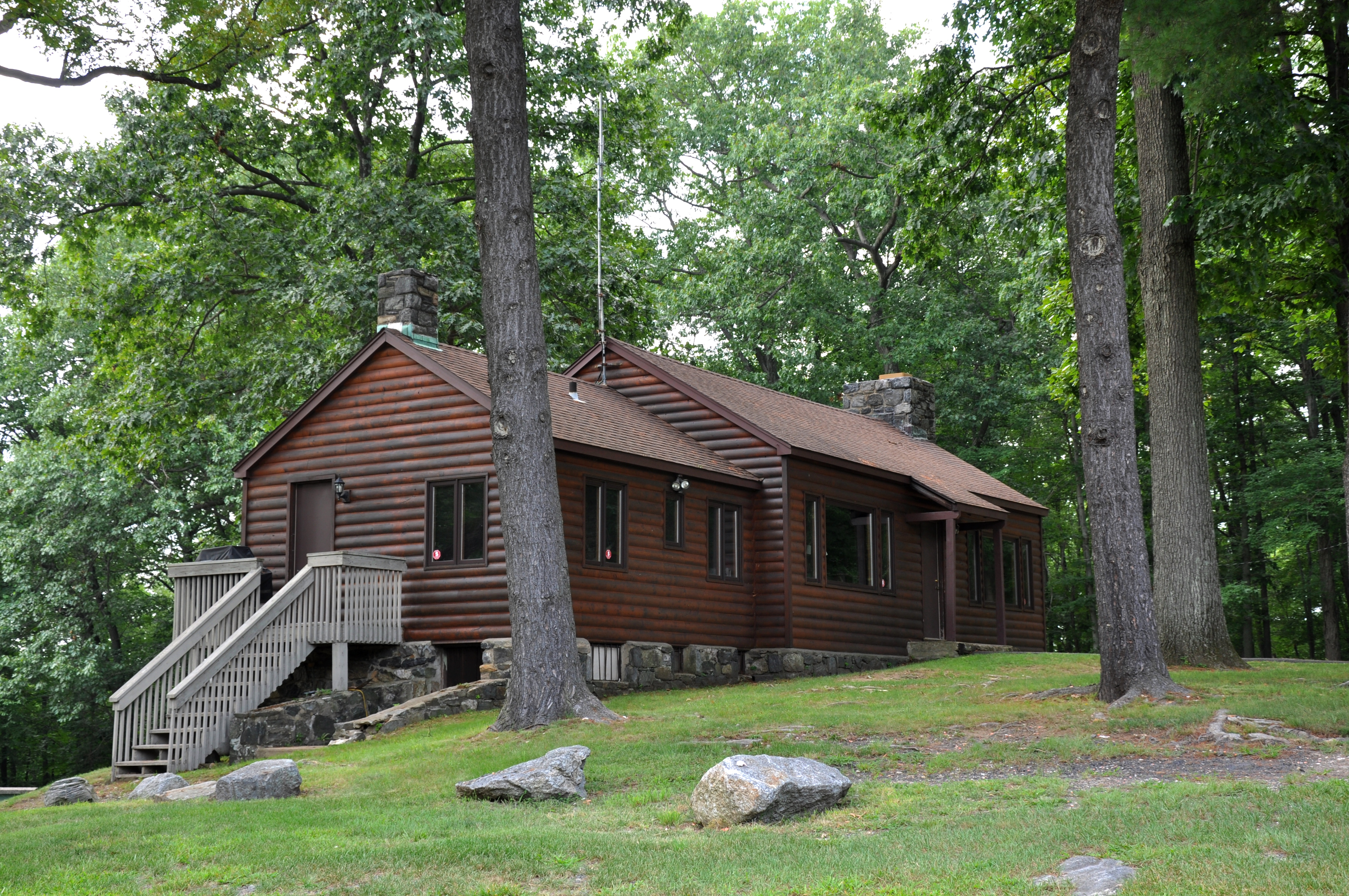
Left to right; the pool and skeet houses

The pool house was built in 1968 and is brick with wood-framed casement windows. It is a divided brick building with locker rooms on the larger west section and a refreshment area on the smaller east section. The west section has a flat roof, and the east section has a shallow hipped roof with a broad overhang. The building does not contribute to the former historic estate.

=== Skeet house ===
The skeet house was built around 1925, and is a small one-story log building, three bays wide and one bay deep with a gable roof. The interior is rustic, with a small kitchen and one large multi-purpose room. The building contributes to the estate's early 20th century development.

=== Logan Memorial Riding Ring ===
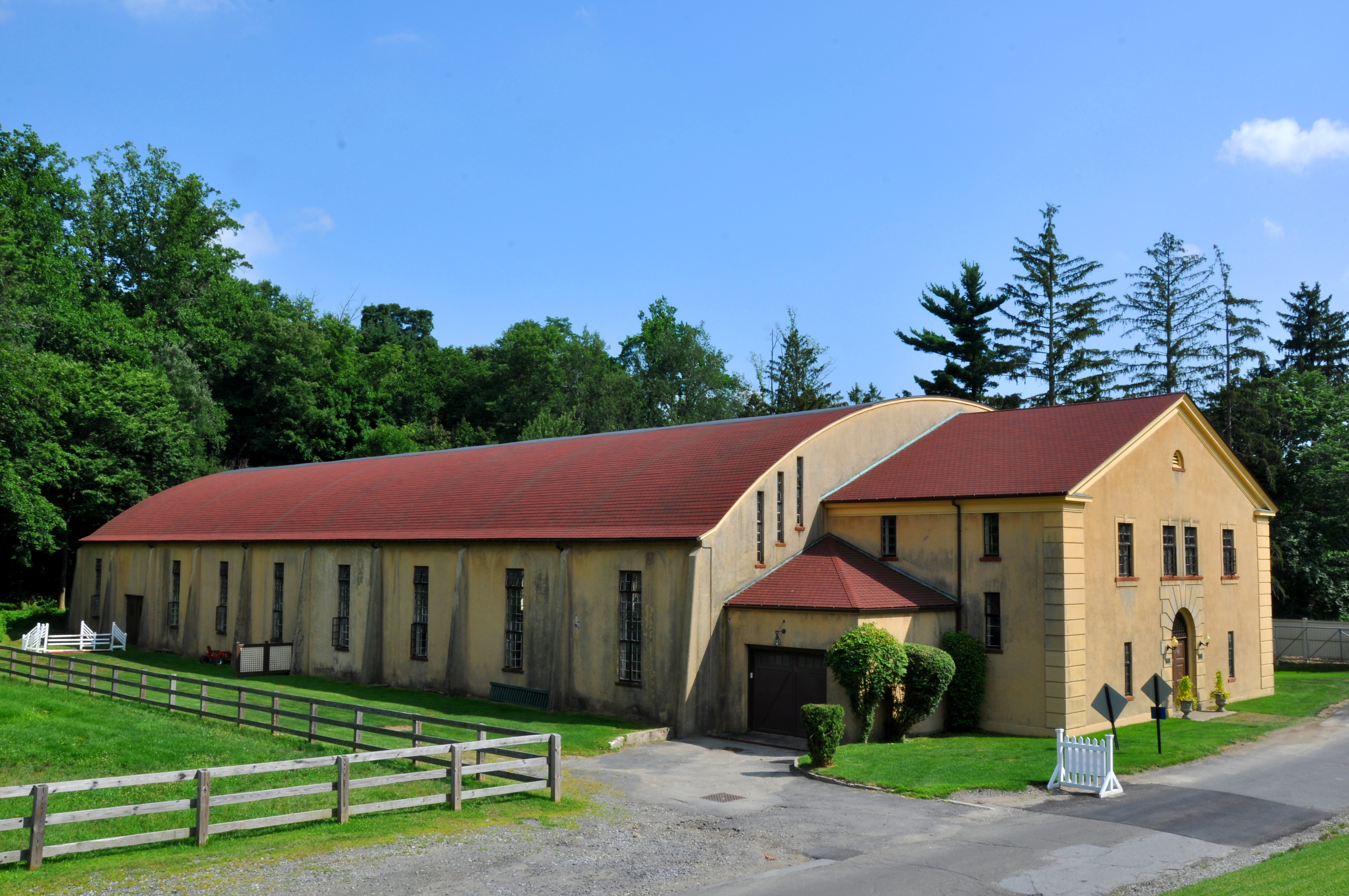
The riding ring

The 17,000-square-foot (1,600 m^{2}) building, originally named the Logan Riding Ring, was completed in 1929. Mrs. Thomas F. Logan, an Ardsley resident and member of the Sleepy Hollow Riding Committee, funded the building's $300,000 expense ($4.82 million in 2025) and supervised its construction. The building has a length of 180 feet and a width of 95 feet. Its exterior is stucco over concrete block; the building has a main section with a round-arched asbestos-shingled roof, and is two stories high, five bays wide (95 feet (29 m)), and ten bays deep (180 feet (55 m)). The building has narrow metal-framed tripartite casement windows with brick sills. The upper, eight-light sections of the windows open horizontally, and the lower portions with sixteen lights open vertically; the central twenty-light sections are fixed. The structure's bays are divided on the side facades by sloping concrete ground-to-cornice buttresses, paired at the intersections of the side and rear facades. Around 1931, an exhibition ring and corrals were constructed near the riding ring.

The main (west) facade has a projecting two and a half-story gable roof section that is three bays wide and two deep. Decorative detail on the exterior includes quoins, the James Gibbs-inspired surround on the main entrance, and the molded surrounds and keystones of the casement windows. In the northwest corner of the intersection between the building's two sections is a one-story-high, one-bay-square addition with a narrow metal casement window on the west facade and a large double entrance for horses on the north. The building's interior consists of a large riding ring that is open to the rafters, and in the gable-roofed section, there are lockers and changing rooms on the first floor and a multi-purpose room on the second; on one of its walls is a floor-to-ceiling window permitting view of the ring activity below.

=== Squash house ===
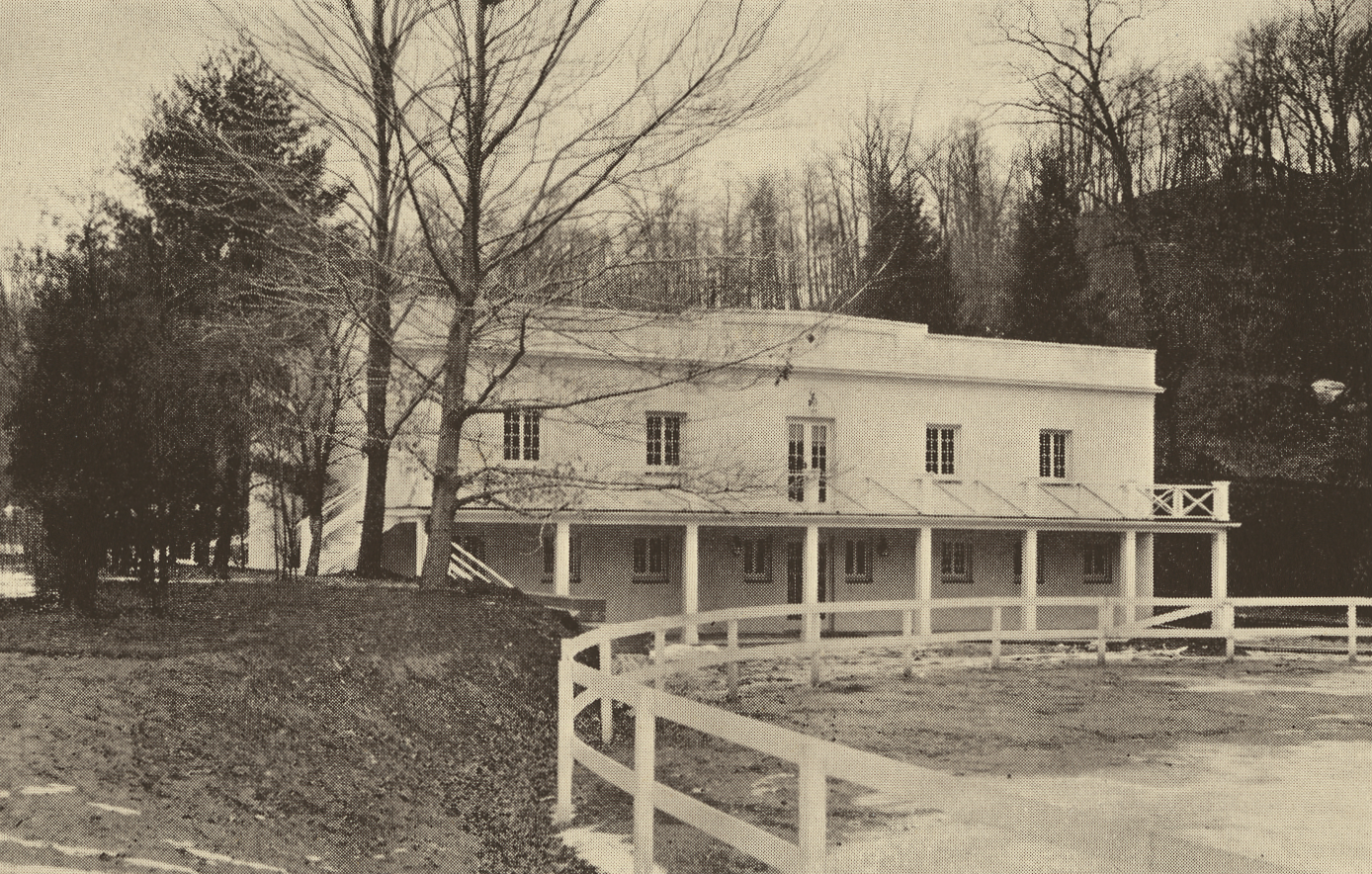
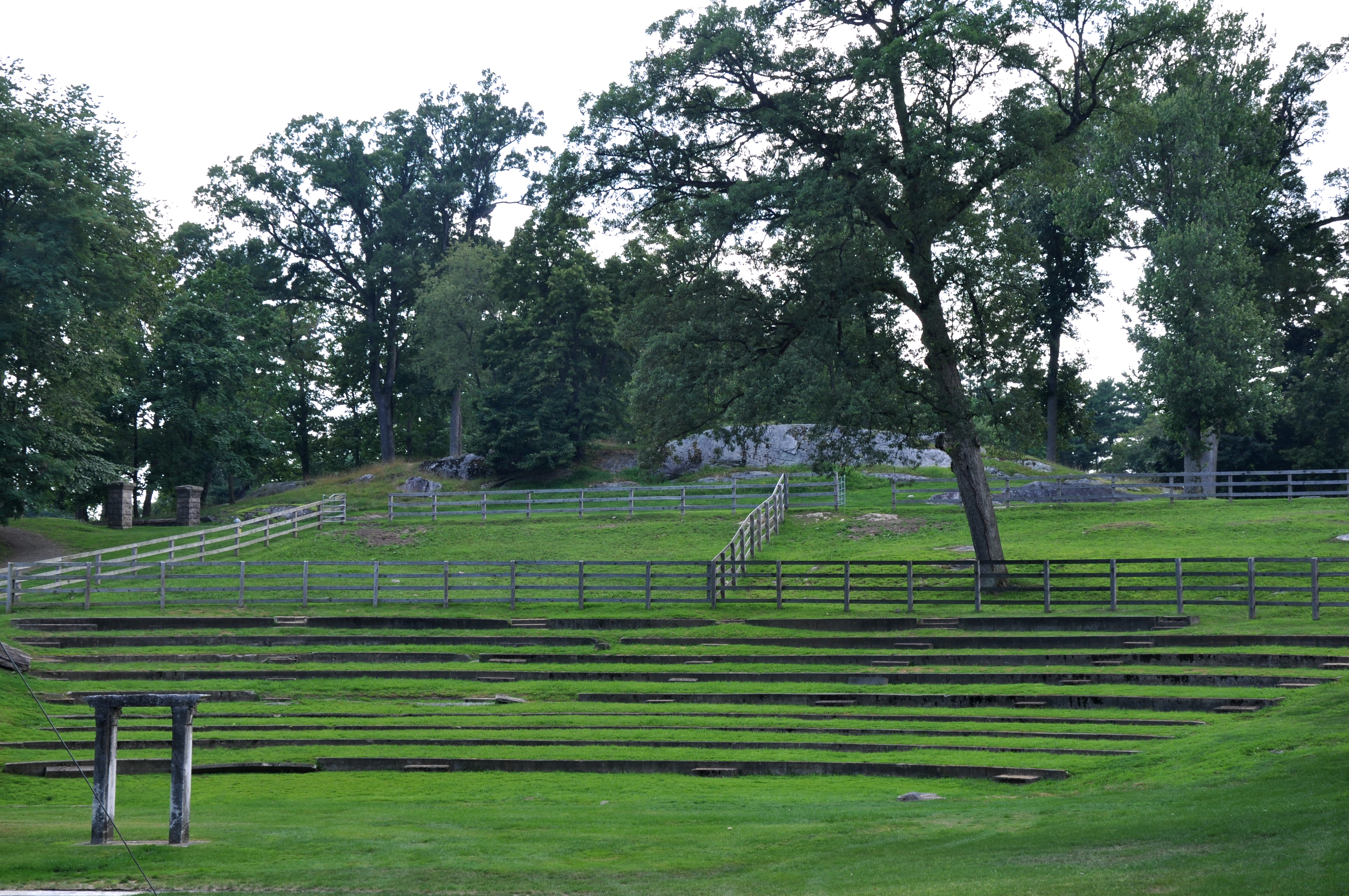
The squash house and Greek-style semicircular theater

The squash house was constructed around 1920, completed in 1931, and was demolished between 2011 and 2013. It was located near the Logan Riding Ring, on the club's south entrance road. It was two stories high, five bays wide and nine bays deep, and was stucco-covered with a flat roof. There were two entrances on the main (south) facade, one at ground level and another on the balcony. The entrances had double wooden doors, paneled below and glazed above. All of the building's windows consisted of wood-framed, paired casement windows with brick sills. A veranda with Tuscan piers extended the length of the main facade, interrupted by a two-bay-wide, one-bay-deep projection east of the main entrance. The building's interior contained a doubles court, two singles courts, a reception room, locker rooms, showers, and a spectators' gallery seating 150. Across the road from where the building stood is an outdoor riding ring enclosed by a rough rail fence. To the west of the building's site, standing alone in the tall grass, is a 16th-century post-and-lintel stone element, which was at the center of the stage of a 1,500-seat outdoor Greek amphitheater that was part of the Shepard estate and was since dismantled.

=== Former manager's house ===
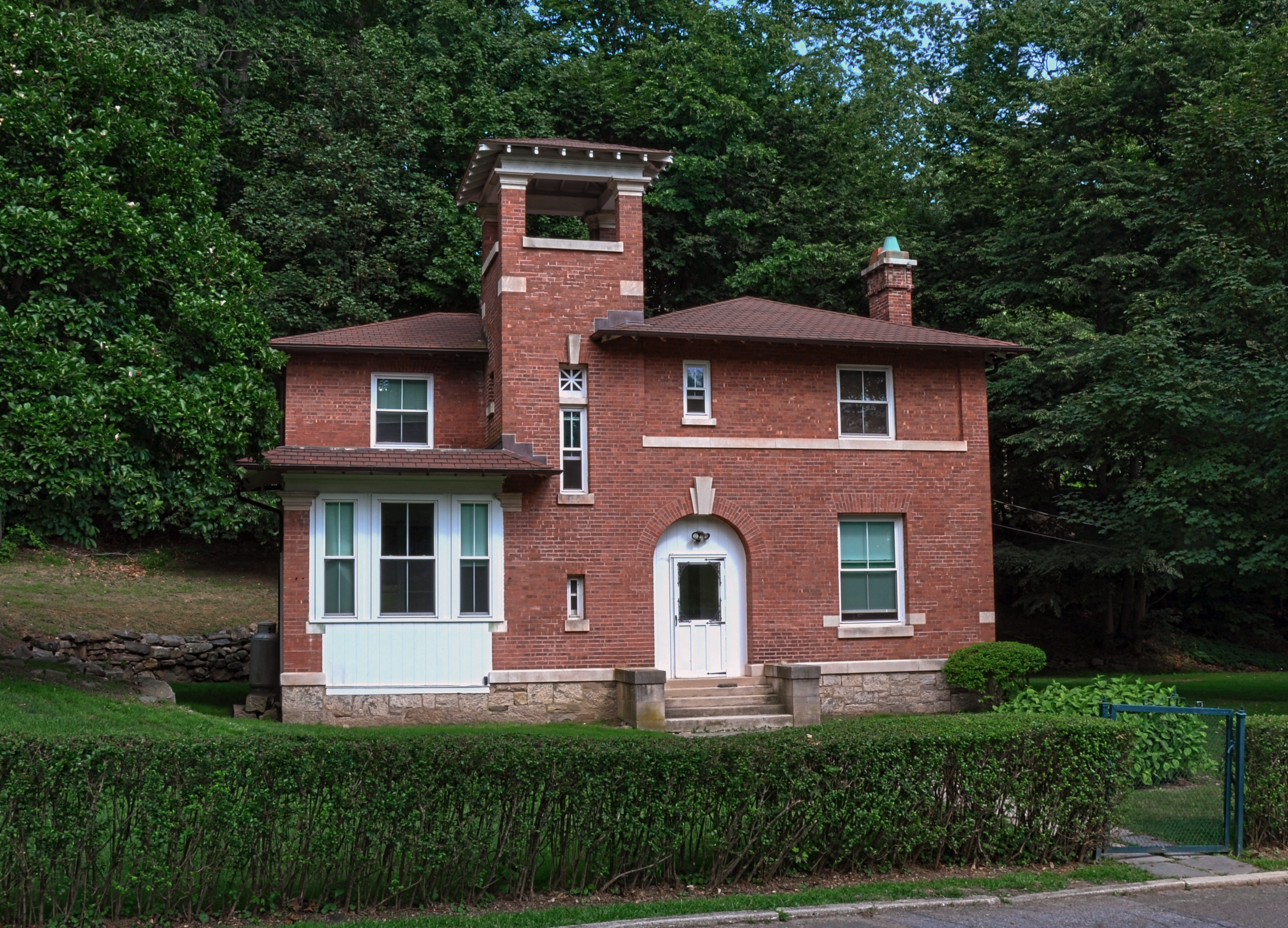
The former manager's house

The manager's house was built of brick and stucco around 1920. It is two stories high, four bays wide, two bays deep, and has an asymmetrical plan. The building has a shallow hip roof with exposed rafter ends. Its windows are primarily one-over-one and double-hung with wood trim, with window-sills made of concrete. There is a three-story rectangular brick tower set into the main (west) facade. The tower is open at the top beneath a wide wood fascia. The building has a brick chimney decorated with corbelling; its chimney coping and caps are made of concrete. The building is now rented to the members.

=== Carriage barn complex ===
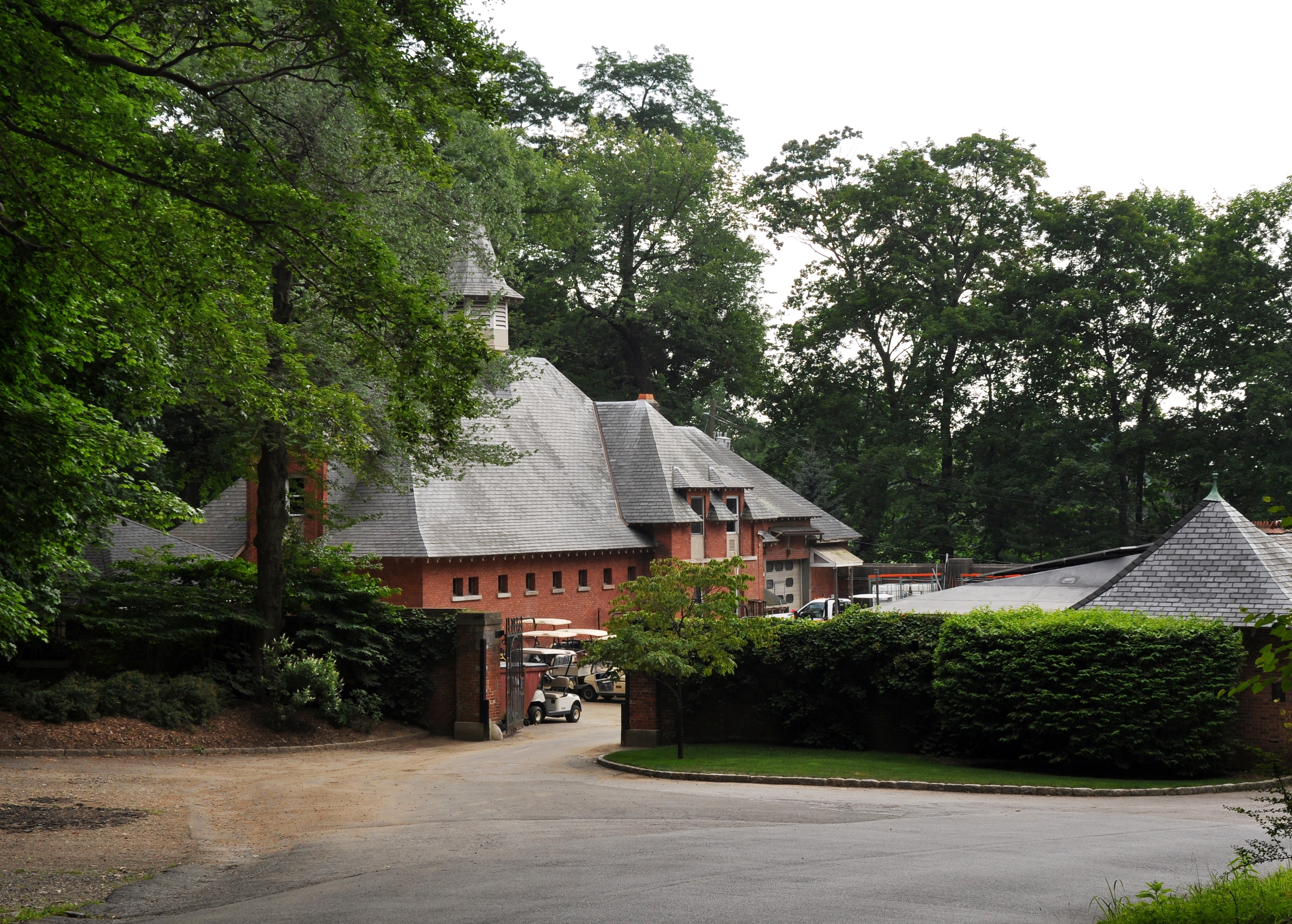
Carriage barn complex

The carriage barn complex predates the Shepards' ownership of the property; it was built around 1875 as part of Wright's original estate. The most prominent component is the brick carriage house, which was designed by McKim, Mead & White. It is made of brick with granite trim and is one and a half stories high, ten bays wide and three bays deep. It has a steeply pitched slate hip roof with spring eaves and exposed rafters. At the roof's ridge sits an octagonal ventilating element with a bell-cast roof.

On the main (north) facade, there is a two-bay-wide projection with a hip roof and two wall dormers. There is a large roof dormer on the side (east) facade which provides exterior access to the hayloft. Other fenestration includes small square windows with fixed sashes near the eaves on all facades and four double-hung windows, two per level, in the main facade's pavilion. Each end facade has a set of large double wood carriage doors. The complex now serves as a storage and maintenance facility for the club's golf carts.

Opposite the carriage barn is another building, also of brick but with a low hip roof. It is one story high, one bay deep and five bays wide. There are three sets of overhead doors on the main (south) facade of the building. A high brick wall encloses the entire complex, and sections of the corner utility structures are a part of the surrounding wall. There is a small building in the northeast corner of the complex; it is one bay square with a steep hip roof with spring eaves. It has single round windows near the root line, on two facades. The building's entrance, on the south facade, is made of wood. The building has a counterpart across the yard, with a low hip roof, a large brick chimney, and a stone water table and string course; it has overhead doors on the north facade.

== Popular culture ==
In the 2011–12 television show Pan Am, Sleepy Hollow Country Club was the setting for much of the series' third episode. Other media filmed at the country club include the 2012 show 666 Park Avenue, the 2009–2016 show The Good Wife, the 2009 film The Six Wives of Henry Lefay, the 2006–13 show 30 Rock, the 2009 television special Michael J. Fox: Adventures of an Incurable Optimist, the 2010 film The Bounty Hunter, the music video of Beyoncé's 2011 song "Best Thing I Never Had", the 2015–present Netflix show Daredevil, and the 2014–present Fox show Gotham. The club also stood in for the Biltmore and Ritz hotels in the 2017 Amazon Video series Z: The Beginning of Everything. It was also used in season 2 of ABC's 2015–present show Quantico. The club's interior and exterior were used throughout three seasons of CBS's 2014–present show Madam Secretary. The production team for the 2017 film The Greatest Showman used the club as a base for filming much of the film.

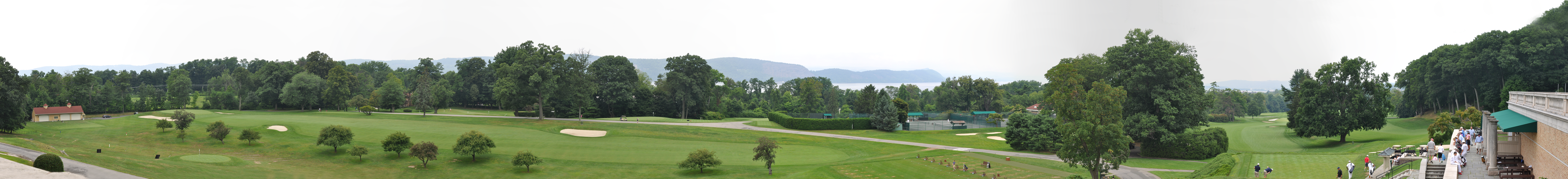
Panorama of part of the course

== Scorecard ==
Sleepy Hollow Country Club - Upper
Tee	Rating/Slope	1	2	3	4	5	6	7	8	9	Out	10	11	12	13	14	15	16	17	18	In	Total
Blue	M-73.8/135	417	372	167	422	441	475	217	462	425	3398	172	433	541	394	413	502	155	446	426	3482	6880
White	M-72.0/132	406	321	153	404	403	458	193	439	377	3154	156	371	513	384	378	437	150	433	401	3223	6377
Green	M-69.1/131	402	312	153	343	393	413	179	350	361	2906	136	361	475	304	359	430	134	375	385	2959	5865
SI	Men's	12	10	16	8	6	2	18	4	14		15	1	9	3	13	7	17	11	5
Par		4	4	3	4	4	5	3	4	4	35	3	4	5	4	4	4	3	4	4	35	70
SI	Women's	12	10	16	8	6	2	18	4	14		15	1	9	3	13	7	17	11	5
Green	L-74.6/135	402	312	153	343	393	413	179	350	361	2906	136	361	475	304	359	430	134	375	385	2959	5865
Red	L-72.5/130	397	279	146	341	383	406	175	424	321	2872	119	323	401	298	277	345	134	371	380	2648	5520

== See also ==
- List of Gilded Age mansions
- National Register of Historic Places listings in northern Westchester County, New York
- History of Briarcliff Manor

== Notes ==
Preceded by Various	Host of the Metropolitan Amateur; 1944, 1965, 1983	Succeeded by Various
Preceded by Newport Country Club	Host of the NYNEX Commemorative; 1986–1993	Succeeded by None (event closed)
Preceded by Flint Hills National Golf Club	Host of the U.S. Women's Amateur Golf Championship; 2002	Succeeded by Philadelphia Country Club
Preceded by Bethpage Black Course	Host of the Metropolitan Open; 2011	Succeeded by Plainfield Country Club
