= Rebel Yell Open =

1968 golf tournament in Knoxville, Tennessee

Tournament information
- Location: Knoxville, Tennessee
- Established: 1968
- Course: Holston Hills Country Club
- Par: 72
- Length: 7,009 yards (6,409 m)
- Tour: PGA Tour
- Format: Stroke play
- Prize fund: US$14,000
- Month played: April
- Final year: 1968

Tournament record score
- Aggregate: 279 Chris Blocker (1968); 279 Larry Mowry (1968)
- To par: −9 as above

Final champion
- (United States) Larry Ziegler
- Location in the United States Location in Tennessee

The Rebel Yell Open was a PGA Tour satellite event that played for one year at the Holston Hills Country Club in Knoxville, Tennessee; a 7,009-yard, Donald Ross-designed course opened in 1927. The tournament, which was held in April 1968 opposite the Masters Tournament, was organized by tournament director Lonnie Nolan. The title sponsor was the bourbon company of the same name.

It was won by 31-year-old Las Vegas, Nevada club professional Larry Mowry in a sudden-death playoff over Chris Blocker. The winners share was $2,800.

== Winner ==
Year	Winner	Score	To par	Margin of victory	Runner-up
1968	(United States) Larry Mowry	279	−9	Playoff	(United States) Chris Blocker
