= Holston Hills Country Club =

Country club in Knoxville, Tennessee

Coordinates: 35°59′32″N 83°50′07″W

Holston Hills Country Club (Holston Hills C.C.) is located in Knoxville, Tennessee. The clubhouse was built in 1927 and designed by the firm, Barber & McMurry. The golf course was designed by Donald Ross. Following its construction, it was recognized as the finest course in the state and hosted all the important regional events. Holston Hills C.C. is one of Ross's most famous designs and is widely considered to be one of the more untouched Donald Ross designs left in the United States. In 2010, Holston Hills C.C. was ranked no. 52 on the Golfweek top 100 classic courses in the United States.

In 1968, Holston Hills hosted the Rebel Yell Open, a PGA Tour satellite event played opposite The Masters. The club also hosted another PGA Tour event, the Knoxville Invitational, for two years in the 1940s.

Holston Hills lies beside the Holston River.

As of 2016 Holston Hills Country Club is owned and operated by McConnell Golf. McConnell Golf is based in Raleigh NC.
