= Charles Owens (golfer) =

American professional golfer (1932–2017)

Charles "Charlie" Owens
Personal information
- Nationality: United States
- Born: February 22, 1932 Winter Haven, Florida, U.S.
- Died: September 7, 2017 (aged 85) Winter Haven, Florida, U.S.

Career
- Sport: Golf
- College: Florida A&M University
- Turned professional: 1967
- Former tours: PGA Tour; Champions Tour
- Professional wins: 4

Number of wins by tour
- PGA Tour Champions: 2
- Other: 2

Charles Owens (February 22, 1932 – September 7, 2017) was an American professional golfer who has played on the PGA Tour and the Senior PGA Tour.

== Early life and amateur career ==
In 1932, Owens was born in Winter Haven, Florida. He played football at Florida A&M University and served in the U.S. Army. He suffered injuries to both knees and his left ankle during a parachute jump at Fort Bragg, North Carolina in 1952 which left him handicapped.

== Professional career ==
In 1967, Owens turned professional. He joined the PGA Tour in 1970. During his seven years on the Tour, he won the 1971 Kemper Asheville Open, a "satellite" PGA Tour event. Owens played with a limp and played all golf shots cross-handed. The biggest year of his professional career came on the Senior PGA Tour in 1986, when he won twice in a three tournament span, and finished eighth on the money list with $207,813.

Owens was allowed to use a cart while competing in most instances due to his disability, and once staged a protest at the 1987 U.S. Senior Open against the USGA for its ban on carts at that event.

Owens also is credited with inventing and popularizing the "long (52") style putter" which he used to overcome the yips.

== Personal life ==
Owens formerly lived in Tampa, Florida and resided in Winter Haven until his death on September 7, 2017.

== Awards and honors ==
- In 1987, Owens was honored with the Ben Hogan Award.
- In 1987, he was inducted into the Florida Sports Hall of Fame.
- In 2007, Owens was inducted into the and the African American Golfers Hall of Fame.

== Professional wins (4) ==
=== Regular career wins (2) ===
- 1971 Kemper Asheville Open (a PGA Tour "satellite" event)
- 1974 Florida Open

=== Senior PGA Tour wins (2) ===
No.	Date	Tournament	Winning score	Margin of victory	Runner(s)-up
1	Feb 9, 1986	Treasure Coast Classic	–14 (65-69-68=202)	3 strokes	(United States) Lee Elder, (United States) Don January
2	Mar 16, 1986	Del E. Webb Senior PGA Tour Roundup	−14 (71-64-67=202)	Playoff	(United States) Dale Douglass

Senior PGA Tour playoff record (1–0)

No.	Year	Tournament	Opponent	Result
1	1986	Del E. Webb Senior PGA Tour Roundup	(United States) Dale Douglass	Won with par on second extra hole

== See also ==
- 1970 PGA Tour Qualifying School graduates
