= Johnny Mathis Seniors Classic =

Golf tournament held in Los Angeles

The Johnny Mathis Seniors Classic was a golf tournament on the Champions Tour from 1985 to 1986. It was played in Los Angeles, California at the Mountaingate Country Club.

The purse for the 1986 tournament was US$250,000, with $37,500 going to the winner. The tournament was founded in 1985 as the American Golf Carta Blanca Johnny Mathis Classic.

== Winners ==
Johnny Mathis Seniors Classic

- 1986 Dale Douglass

American Golf Carta Blanca Johnny Mathis Classic

- 1985 Peter Thomson
