= Treasure Coast Classic =

American golf tournament (1985 – 1986)

The Treasure Coast Classic was a golf tournament on the Champions Tour from 1985 to 1986. It was played in Fort Pierce, Florida at the TPC at Monte Carlo.

The purse for the 1986 tournament was US$225,000, with $33,750 going to the winner. The tournament was founded in 1985 as the Sunrise Senior Classic.

== Winners ==
Treasure Coast Classic

- 1986 Charles Owens

Sunrise Senior Classic

- 1985 Miller Barber
