= NYNEX Commemorative =

Former golf tournament on Champions Tour

The NYNEX Commemorative was a golf tournament on the Champions Tour from 1982 to 1993. It was played in Newport, Rhode Island at the Newport Country Club (1982–1985) and in Scarborough, New York at the Sleepy Hollow Country Club (1986–1993).

The purse for the 1993 tournament was US$550,000, with $82,500 going to the winner. The tournament was founded in 1982 as the Merrill Lynch/Golf Digest Commemorative Pro-Am.

== Winners ==
NYNEX Commemorative

- 1993 Bob Wynn
- 1992 Dale Douglass
- 1991 Charles Coody
- 1990 Lee Trevino

NYNEX/Golf Digest Commemorative

- 1989 Bob Charles
- 1988 Bob Charles
- 1987 Gene Littler

Merrill Lynch/Golf Digest Commemorative

- 1986 Lee Elder

Merrill Lynch/Golf Digest Commemorative Pro-Am

- 1985 Lee Elder
- 1984 Roberto De Vicenzo
- 1983 Miller Barber
- 1982 Billy Casper
- 1981 Doug Ford (unofficial event)
