= Pepsi Senior Challenge =

The Pepsi Senior Challenge was a golf tournament on the Champions Tour from 1986 to 1988. It was played in Roswell, Georgia at the Horseshoe Bend Country Club.

The purse for the 1988 tournament was US$300,000, with $45,000 going to the winner.

== Winners ==
- 1988 Bob Charles
- 1987 Larry Mowry
- 1986 Bruce Crampton
