= Larry Mowry =

American professional golfer (born 1936)

Personal information
- Nationality: United States
- Born: October 20, 1936 (age 90) San Diego, California, U.S.
- Height: 6 ft 2 in (1.88 m)
- Weight: 194 lb (88 kg; 13.9 st)

Career
- Sport: Golf
- Turned professional: 1959
- Former tours: PGA Tour; Champions Tour
- Professional wins: 10

Number of wins by tour
- PGA Tour Champions: 5

Best results in major championships
- Masters Tournament: DNP
- PGA Championship: T11: 1969
- U.S. Open: CUT: 1961, 1964
- The Open Championship: DNP

Larry Mowry (born October 20, 1936) is an American professional golfer who played on the PGA Tour and Senior PGA Tour.

== Career ==
In 1936, Mowry was born in San Diego, California.

In 1959, he turned professional and spent most of his regular career as a club professional. Mowry played on the PGA Tour full-time for several years in the 1960s. He won the 1968 Rebel Yell Open and finished T-2 at the 1969 Azalea Open Invitational. Mowry's best finish in a major was a T-11 at the 1969 PGA Championship.

Mowry's win at the 1987 Crestar Classic made him the first player in Senior PGA Tour history to win an event after making it through the rigors of Monday qualifying. That victory also made him the first former club professional to post an official Senior PGA Tour win. The biggest win of Mowry's career came at the 1989 Senior PGA Championship, which was held at the PGA National Golf Course in Palm Beach Gardens, Florida.

== Personal life ==
Mowry is married and has two adult children and five grandchildren.

== Professional wins (10) ==
=== Senior PGA Tour wins (5) ===
Legend
Senior major championships (1)
Other Senior PGA Tour (4)

No.	Date	Tournament	Winning score	Margin of victory	Runner(s)-up
1	Sep 20, 1987	Crestar Classic	−13 (67-69-67=203)	1 stroke	(New Zealand) Bob Charles, (South Africa) Gary Player
2	Oct 11, 1987	Pepsi Senior Challenge	−13 (70-67-66=203)	2 strokes	(United States) Gene Littler
3	Oct 30, 1988	General Tire Las Vegas Classic	−12 (68-65-71=204)	2 strokes	(New Zealand) Bob Charles, (United States) Bobby Nichols
4	Feb 12, 1989	General Foods PGA Seniors' Championship	−7 (74-69-65-73=281)	1 stroke	(United States) Miller Barber, (United States) Al Geiberger
5	May 7, 1989	RJR at The Dominion	−15 (66-67-68=201)	4 strokes	(United States) Gay Brewer

=== Other wins (5) ===
- 1968 Rebel Yell Open
- 1969 Magnolia State Classic
- 1979 Florida Open, Colorado Open
- 1983 Florida Open

== Senior major championships ==
=== Wins (1) ===
Year	Championship	Winning score	Margin	Runners-up
1989	General Foods PGA Seniors' Championship	−7 (74-69-65-73=281)	1 stroke	(United States) Miller Barber, (United States) Al Geiberger
