= MONY Arizona Classic =

Former golf tournament

The MONY Arizona Classic was a golf tournament on the Champions Tour from 1984 to 1989. It was played in Sun City West, Arizona, at the Hillcrest Golf Club (1984–1988) and in Phoenix, Arizona at the Pointe Golf Club (1989).

The purse for the 1989 tournament was US$300,000, with $45,000 going to the winner. The tournament was founded in 1984 as the Senior PGA Tour Roundup.

== Winners ==
MONY Arizona Classic

- 1989 Bruce Crampton

Pointe/Del E. Webb Arizona Classic

- 1988 Al Geiberger

Del E. Webb Arizona Classic

- 1987 Billy Casper

Del E. Webb Senior PGA Tour Roundup

- 1986 Charles Owens

Senior PGA Tour Roundup

- 1985 Don January
- 1984 Billy Casper
