= 1982 Senior PGA Tour =

Golf tour season

1982 Senior PGA Tour season
- Duration: April 1, 1982 – December 5, 1982
- Number of official events: 11
- Most wins: (United States) Miller Barber (3)
- Money list: (United States) Miller Barber

The 1982 Senior PGA Tour was the third season of the Senior PGA Tour, the main professional golf tour in the United States for men aged 50 and over.

== Schedule ==
The following table lists official events during the 1982 season.

Date	Tournament	Location	Purse (US$)	Winner (Note: The number in parentheses after each winner's name is the number of Senior PGA Tour events they had won up to and including that tournament. This information is only shown for Senior PGA Tour members.)	Notes
Apr 4	Michelob Senior Classic	Florida	125,000	(United States) Don January (4)	
Jun 13	Marlboro Classic	Massachusetts	150,000	(United States) Arnold Palmer (3)	
Jun 27	Peter Jackson Champions	Canada	200,000	(United States) Bob Goalby (2)	
Jul 11	U.S. Senior Open	Oregon	150,000	(United States) Miller Barber (4)	Senior major championship
Aug 15	Denver Post Champions of Golf	Colorado	150,000	(United States) Arnold Palmer (4)	
Aug 22	Greater Syracuse Senior's Pro Golf Classic	New York	150,000	(United States) Bill Collins (1)	
Aug 28	Shootout at Jeremy Ranch	Utah	150,000	(United States) Billy Casper (1)	New tournament
Sep 19	Merrill Lynch/Golf Digest Commemorative Pro-Am	Rhode Island	125,000	(United States) Billy Casper (2)	New to Senior PGA Tour; Pro-Am
Oct 17	Suntree Classic	Florida	135,000	(United States) Miller Barber (5)	
Oct 24	Hilton Head Seniors International	South Carolina	112,500	(United States) Miller Barber (6) (United States) Dan Sikes (1)	New tournament Title shared
Dec 5	PGA Seniors' Championship	Florida	150,000	(United States) Don January (5)	Senior major championship, 1983 season.

== Money list ==
The money list was based on prize money won during the season, calculated in U.S. dollars.

Position	Player	Prize money ($)
1	(United States) Miller Barber	106,890
2	(United States) Don January	99,508
3	(United States) Bob Goalby	94,540
4	(United States) Arnold Palmer	73,848
5	(United States) Billy Casper	71,979

== Awards ==
Award	Winner	Ref.
Scoring leader (Byron Nelson Award)	(United States) Don January	
