= 1983 Senior PGA Tour =

Golf tour season

1983 Senior PGA Tour season
- Duration: March 18, 1983 – December 4, 1983
- Number of official events: 16
- Most wins: (United States) Don January (6)
- Money list: (United States) Don January

The 1983 Senior PGA Tour was the fourth season of the Senior PGA Tour, the main professional golf tour in the United States for men aged 50 and over.

== Schedule ==
The following table lists official events during the 1983 season.

Date	Tournament	Location	Purse (US$)	Winner (Note: The number in parentheses after each winner's name is the number of Senior PGA Tour events they had won up to and including that tournament. This information is only shown for Senior PGA Tour members.)	Notes
Mar 20	Greater Daytona Senior Classic	Florida	150,000	(United States) Gene Littler (1)	New tournament
May 22	Hall of Fame Tournament	North Carolina	150,000	(United States) Rod Funseth (1)	New tournament
Jun 5	Gatlin Brothers Seniors Golf Classic	Nevada	200,000	(United States) Don January (6)	New tournament
Jun 12	Senior Tournament Players Championship	Ohio	250,000	(United States) Miller Barber (7)	New tournament Senior PGA Tour major championship
Jun 26	Peter Jackson Champions	Canada	200,000	(United States) Don January (7)	
Jul 3	Marlboro Classic	Massachusetts	150,000	(United States) Don January (8)	
Jul 10	Greater Syracuse Senior's Pro Classic	New York	150,000	(United States) Gene Littler (2)	
Jul 17	Merrill Lynch/Golf Digest Commemorative Pro-Am	Rhode Island	150,000	(United States) Miller Barber (8)	Pro-Am
Jul 25	U.S. Senior Open	Minnesota	175,000	(United States) Billy Casper (3)	Senior major championship
Aug 21	Denver Post Champions of Golf	Colorado	150,000	(United States) Don January (9)	
Sep 4	Citizens Union Senior Golf Classic	Kentucky	150,000	(United States) Don January (10)	New tournament
Sep 25	World Seniors Invitational	North Carolina	152,000	(United States) Doug Sanders (1)	
Oct 2	United Virginia Bank Seniors	Virginia	150,000	(United States) Miller Barber (9)	New tournament
Oct 16	Suntree Classic	Florida	135,000	(United States) Don January (11)	
Oct 23	Hilton Head Seniors International	South Carolina	150,000	(United States) Miller Barber (10)	
Dec 4	Boca Grove Seniors Classic	Florida	150,000	(United States) Arnold Palmer (5)	New tournament

== Money list ==
The money list was based on prize money won during the season, calculated in U.S. dollars.

Position	Player	Prize money ($)
1	(United States) Don January	237,571
2	(United States) Miller Barber	231,008
3	(United States) Billy Casper	136,749
4	(United States) Gene Littler	130,002
5	(United States) Rod Funseth	120,367

== Awards ==
Award	Winner	Ref.
Scoring leader (Byron Nelson Award)	(United States) Don January	
