= 1985 Senior PGA Tour =

Golf tour season

1985 Senior PGA Tour season
- Duration: February 8, 1986 – November 23, 1985
- Number of official events: 24
- Most wins: (United States) Peter Thomson (9)
- Money list: (United States) Peter Thomson

The 1985 Senior PGA Tour was the sixth season of the Senior PGA Tour, the main professional golf tour in the United States for men aged 50 and over.

== Schedule ==
The following table lists official events during the 1985 season.

Date	Tournament	Location	Purse (US$)	Winner (Note: The number in parentheses after each winner's name is the number of Senior PGA Tour events they had won up to and including that tournament. This information is only shown for Senior PGA Tour members.)	Notes
Feb 10	Sunrise Senior Classic	Florida	200,000	(United States) Miller Barber (15)	New tournament
Mar 17	Vintage Invitational	California	300,000	(Australia) Peter Thomson (3)	
Mar 24	Senior PGA Tour Roundup	Arizona	200,000	(United States) Don January (15)	
Mar 31	American Golf Carta Blanca Johnny Mathis Classic	California	250,000	(Australia) Peter Thomson (4)	New tournament
May 5	MONY Senior Tournament of Champions	California	100,000	(Australia) Peter Thomson (5)	
May 12	Dominion Seniors	Texas	200,000	(United States) Don January (16)	New tournament
May 19	United Hospitals Senior Golf Championship	Pennsylvania	200,000	(United States) Don January (17)	New tournament
Jun 2	Denver Post Champions of Golf	Colorado	200,000	(United States) Lee Elder (3)	
Jun 9	The Champions Classic	Nevada	200,000	(Australia) Peter Thomson (6)	
Jun 16	Senior Players Reunion Pro-Am	Texas	175,000	(Australia) Peter Thomson (7)	New tournament Pro-Am
Jun 23	Senior Tournament Players Championship	Ohio	240,000	(United States) Arnold Palmer (9)	Senior PGA Tour major championship
Jun 30	U.S. Senior Open	Nevada	225,000	(United States) Miller Barber (16)	Senior major championship
Jul 6	The Greenbrier American Express Championship	West Virginia	200,000	(United States) Don January (18)	New tournament
Jul 21	MONY Syracuse Senior's Classic	New York	200,000	(Australia) Peter Thomson (8)	
Jul 28	Merrill Lynch/Golf Digest Commemorative Pro-Am	Rhode Island	175,000	(United States) Lee Elder (4)	Pro-Am
Aug 4	Digital Seniors Classic	Massachusetts	200,000	(United States) Lee Elder (5)	
Aug 18	du Maurier Champions	Canada	225,000	(Australia) Peter Thomson (9)	
Sep 1	Citizens Union Senior Golf Classic	Kentucky	200,000	(United States) Lee Elder (6)	
Sep 15	United Virginia Bank Seniors	Virginia	250,000	(Australia) Peter Thomson (10)	
Sep 22	PaineWebber World Seniors Invitational	North Carolina	200,000	(United States) Miller Barber (17)	
Oct 13	Hilton Head Seniors International	South Carolina	200,000	(United States) Mike Fetchick (1)	
Oct 20	Barnett Suntree Senior Classic	Florida	165,000	(Australia) Peter Thomson (11)	
Oct 27	Seiko-Tucson Senior Match Play Championship	Arizona	300,000	(South Africa) Harold Henning (1)	
Nov 23	Quadel Seniors Classic	Florida	200,000	(South Africa) Gary Player (1)	

== Money list ==
The money list was based on prize money won during the season, calculated in U.S. dollars.

Position	Player	Prize money ($)
1	(Australia) Peter Thomson	386,724
2	(United States) Lee Elder	307,795
3	(United States) Don January	247,006
4	(United States) Miller Barber	241,999
5	(United States) Gene Littler	200,981

== Awards ==
Award	Winner	Ref.
Scoring leader (Byron Nelson Award)	(United States) Don January	
