= Jim Ferree =

American professional golfer (1931–2023)

Personal information
- Full name: Purvis Jennings Ferree
- Nickname: Jim
- Nationality: United States
- Born: June 10, 1931 Pinebluff, North Carolina, U.S.
- Died: March 14, 2023 (aged 91)

Career
- Sport: Golf
- College: North Carolina
- Turned professional: 1955
- Former tours: PGA Tour; Senior PGA Tour
- Professional wins: 19

Number of wins by tour
- PGA Tour: 1
- PGA Tour Champions: 2
- Other: 12 (regular); 4 (senior)

Best results in major championships
- Masters Tournament: DNP
- PGA Championship: T28: 1964
- U.S. Open: T17: 1957
- The Open Championship: DNP

Achievements and awards
- Senior PGA Tour Comeback Player of the Year: 1993

Purvis Jennings "Jim" Ferree (June 10, 1931 – March 14, 2023) was an American professional golfer who played on the PGA Tour and the Senior PGA Tour.

== Early life and amateur career ==
In 1931, Ferree was born in Pinebluff, North Carolina. He grew up in Winston-Salem and graduated from Richard J. Reynolds High School. Ferree learned the game of golf from his father, Purvis, long-time pro at Winston-Salem's Old Town Club.

Ferree played college golf at the University of North Carolina in Chapel Hill. Afterwards, Ferree briefly served in the U.S. Army.

== Professional career ==
In 1955, Ferree turned professional. He had one PGA Tour win during his regular career years. He was regarded as one of the very best in the game in the tee-to-green ball-striking phase of the game, but putting was always his weakness. He spent most of his thirties and forties as the director of golf at Long Cove Club in Hilton Head, South Carolina.

Ferree was later a club pro and joined the Senior PGA Tour at age fifty in 1981. He was chosen by PGA Commissioner Deane Beman to be the model for the knickers-wearing player on the Senior Tour's logo. He shares the Georgia-Pacific Grand Champions record for most victories (9) with two other golfers.

== Personal life ==
Ferree lived in Hilton Head, South Carolina with his wife, Karen, also a former champion golfer.

Ferree died on March 14, 2023, at the age of 91.

== Awards and honors ==
- In 1991, he became the first golfer inducted into the University of North Carolina's Hall of Fame.
- In 1993, Ferree was named the Senior PGA Tour's Comeback Player of the Year.

== Professional wins (19) ==
=== PGA Tour wins (1) ===
No.	Date	Tournament	Winning score	To par	Margin of victory	Runner-up
1	Sep 1, 1958	Vancouver Open Invitational	69-61-69-71=270	−18	1 stroke	(United States) Billy Casper

=== Other wins (12) ===
this list is probably incomplete

- 1954 Forsyth County tournament
- 1955 Forsyth County tournament
- 1958 British Columbia Centennial Open
- 1961 Jamaica Open
- 1962 Panama Open
- 1963 Maracaibo Open Invitational
- 1966 Carolinas PGA Championship
- 1967 Georgia PGA Championship
- 1977 Tri-State Open
- 1978 Tri-State PGA Championship
- 1981 Tri-State PGA Championship
- 1983 Tri-State Open

=== Senior PGA Tour wins (2) ===
No.	Date	Tournament	Winning score	To par	Margin of victory	Runners-up
1	Jul 20, 1986	Greater Grand Rapids Open	68-66-70=204	−9	Playoff	(United States) Gene Littler, (United States) Chi-Chi Rodríguez
2	May 26, 1991	Bell Atlantic Classic	67-69-72=208	−8	2 strokes	(United States) Jim Colbert, (United States) Lee Trevino

Senior PGA Tour playoff record (1–3)

No.	Year	Tournament	Opponent(s)	Result
1	1986	The Greenbrier American Express Championship	(United States) Don January	Lost to par on first extra hole
2	1986	Greater Grand Rapids Open	(United States) Gene Littler, (United States) Chi-Chi Rodríguez	Won with birdie on first extra hole
3	1987	Seniors International Golf Championship	(United States) Al Geiberger	Lost to birdie on second extra hole
4	1989	GTE Suncoast Classic	(New Zealand) Bob Charles, (South Africa) Harold Henning, (United States) Dave Hill	Charles won with birdie on third extra hole Ferree and Hill eliminated by birdie on first hole

=== Other senior wins (4) ===
this list is probably incomplete

- 1997 Liberty Mutual Legends of Golf - Demaret Division (with George Bayer)
- 2002 Liberty Mutual Legends of Golf - Demaret Division (with Miller Barber)
- 2003 Liberty Mutual Legends of Golf - Demaret Division (with Miller Barber)
- 2006 Grand Champions team better-ball (with Jack Fleck)

== U.S. national team appearances ==
- PGA Cup: 1979

== Video ==
- YouTube – Jim Ferree interview (2014)
