= 1987 Senior PGA Tour =

Golf tour season

1987 Senior PGA Tour season
- Duration: January 7, 1987 – December 13, 1987
- Number of official events: 33
- Most wins: (United States) Chi-Chi Rodríguez (7)
- Money list: (United States) Chi-Chi Rodríguez

The 1987 Senior PGA Tour was the eighth season of the Senior PGA Tour, the main professional golf tour in the United States for men aged 50 and over.

== Schedule ==
The following table lists official events during the 1987 season.

Date	Tournament	Location	Purse (US$)	Winner (Note: The number in parentheses after each winner's name is the number of Senior PGA Tour events they had won up to and including that tournament. This information is only shown for Senior PGA Tour members.)	Notes
Jan 10	MONY Senior Tournament of Champions	California	100,000	(United States) Don January (22)	
Feb 15	General Foods PGA Seniors' Championship	Florida	260,000	(United States) Chi-Chi Rodríguez (4)	Senior major championship
Mar 15	Del E. Webb Arizona Classic	Arizona	200,000	(United States) Billy Casper (5)	
Mar 22	Vintage Chrysler Invitational	California	270,000	(New Zealand) Bob Charles (1)	
Mar 29	GTE Classic	California	275,000	(New Zealand) Bob Charles (2)	New tournament
May 3	Sunwest Bank Charley Pride Senior Golf Classic	New Mexico	250,000	(New Zealand) Bob Charles (3)	
May 10	Vantage at The Dominion	Texas	250,000	(United States) Chi-Chi Rodríguez (5)	
May 17	United Hospitals Senior Golf Championship	Pennsylvania	225,000	(United States) Chi-Chi Rodríguez (6)	
May 24	Silver Pages Classic	Oklahoma	250,000	(United States) Chi-Chi Rodríguez (7)	New tournament
May 31	Denver Champions of Golf	Colorado	250,000	(Australia) Bruce Crampton (8)	
Jun 7	Senior Players Reunion Pro-Am	Texas	200,000	(United States) Chi-Chi Rodríguez (8)	Pro-Am
Jun 14	Mazda Senior Tournament Players Championship	Florida	400,000	(South Africa) Gary Player (5)	Senior PGA Tour major championship
Jun 28	Greater Grand Rapids Open	Michigan	250,000	(United States) Billy Casper (6)	
Jul 5	The Greenbrier American Express Championship	West Virginia	225,000	(Australia) Bruce Crampton (9)	
Jul 12	U.S. Senior Open	Connecticut	300,000	(South Africa) Gary Player (6)	Senior major championship
Jul 19	MONY Syracuse Senior Classic	New York	250,000	(Australia) Bruce Crampton (10)	
Jul 26	Seniors' British Open	Scotland	£150,000	(England) Neil Coles (n/a)	New tournament Senior major championship (Note: Unofficial money event at the time, but retrospectively counted as an official win.)
Aug 2	NYNEX/Golf Digest Commemorative	New York	250,000	(United States) Gene Littler (6)	
Aug 9	Digital Seniors Classic	Massachusetts	250,000	(United States) Chi-Chi Rodríguez (9)	
Aug 16	Rancho Murieta Senior Gold Rush	California	300,000	(United States) Orville Moody (3)	New tournament
Aug 23	GTE Northwest Classic	Washington	300,000	(United States) Chi-Chi Rodríguez (10)	
Aug 30	Showdown Classic	Utah	300,000	(United States) Miller Barber (19)	
Sep 6	Bank One Senior Golf Classic	Kentucky	225,000	(Australia) Bruce Crampton (11)	
Sep 13	PaineWebber World Seniors Invitational	North Carolina	250,000	(South Africa) Gary Player (7)	
Sep 20	Crestar Classic	Virginia	325,000	(United States) Larry Mowry (1)	
Sep 27	Newport Cup	Rhode Island	200,000	(United States) Miller Barber (20)	New tournament
Oct 4	Vantage Championship	North Carolina	1,000,000	(United States) Al Geiberger (1)	New tournament
Oct 11	Pepsi Senior Challenge	Georgia	250,000	(United States) Larry Mowry (2)	
Oct 18	Seniors International Golf Championship	South Carolina	250,000	(United States) Al Geiberger (2)	
Oct 25	Las Vegas Senior Classic	Nevada	250,000	(United States) Al Geiberger (3)	
Nov 15	Fairfield Barnett Senior Classic	Florida	200,000	(United States) Dave Hill (1)	
Nov 22	Gus Machado Senior Classic	Florida	300,000	(United States) Gene Littler (7)	New tournament
Dec 13	GTE Kaanapali Classic	Hawaii	300,000	(United States) Orville Moody (4)	New tournament

== Money list ==
The money list was based on prize money won during the season, calculated in U.S. dollars.

Position	Player	Prize money ($)
1	(United States) Chi-Chi Rodríguez	509,145
2	(Australia) Bruce Crampton	437,904
3	(New Zealand) Bob Charles	389,437
4	(United States) Orville Moody	355,793
5	(United States) Miller Barber	347,571

== Awards ==
Award	Winner	Ref.
Scoring leader (Byron Nelson Award)	(United States) Chi-Chi Rodríguez	
