= Howie Johnson =

American golfer (1925–2015)

Personal information
- Full name: Howard Johnson
- Nationality: United States
- Born: September 8, 1925 Saint Paul, Minnesota, U.S.
- Died: September 13, 2015 (aged 90) Palm Desert, California, U.S.
- Height: 6 ft 2 in (1.88 m)
- Weight: 195 lb (88 kg; 13.9 st)

Career
- Sport: Golf
- College: University of Minnesota
- Turned professional: 1956
- Former tours: PGA Tour; Senior PGA Tour
- Professional wins: 3

Number of wins by tour
- PGA Tour: 2
- Other: 1

Best results in major championships
- Masters Tournament: T18: 1970
- PGA Championship: T19: 1969
- U.S. Open: T12: 1970
- The Open Championship: T20: 1971

Howard Johnson (September 8, 1925 – September 13, 2015) was an American professional golfer who played on the PGA Tour and the Senior PGA Tour.

== Career ==
Born in Saint Paul, Minnesota, Johnson played college golf at the University of Minnesota, where he was team captain. He did not turn professional until age 30, and then only on a dare.

Johnson joined the PGA Tour in 1956 and had two victories. He won his first tour event in 1958 at the Azalea Open, in a playoff with Arnold Palmer. His best finish in a major was T-12 at the U.S. Open in 1970.

Johnson joined the Senior PGA Tour in 1980 and his best finish was a T-2 at the Vintage Chrysler Invitational in 1987.

== Personal life ==
Johnson lived in Rancho Mirage, California, and his son, Howard Johnson, Jr., played on the Nationwide Tour.

Johnson died in September 2015 at the age of 90.

== Professional wins (3) ==
=== PGA Tour wins (2) ===
No.	Date	Tournament	Winning score	To par	Margin of victory	Runner-up
1	Mar 30, 1958	Azalea Open	74-68-72-68=282	−6	Playoff	(United States) Arnold Palmer
2	Mar 1, 1959	Baton Rouge Open Invitational	72-71-70-70=283	−5	1 stroke	(United States) Jay Hebert

PGA Tour playoff record (1–1)

No.	Year	Tournament	Opponent(s)	Result
1	1958	Azalea Open	(United States) Arnold Palmer	Won 18-hole playoff; Johnson: +5 (77), Palmer: +6 (78)
2	1970	Greater New Orleans Open Invitational	(United States) Miller Barber, (New Zealand) Bob Charles	Barber won with birdie on second extra hole

=== Other wins (1) ===
- 1960 Mexican Open
