= U.S. Senior Open =

One of the five major championships in senior golf

Tournament information
- Location: Columbus, Ohio, U.S.
- Established: 1980
- Course: Scioto Country Club
- Par: 70
- Length: 7,247 yards (6,627 m)
- Organized by: USGA
- Tours: PGA Tour Champions; European Senior Tour
- Format: Stroke play
- Prize fund: US$4,000,000
- Month played: June

Tournament record score
- Aggregate: 261 Steve Stricker (2019)
- To par: −20 Fred Funk (2009)

Current champion
- (Republic of Ireland) Pádraig Harrington

Location map
- Location in the United States Location in Ohio

The U.S. Senior Open is one of the five major championships in senior golf, introduced 46 years ago in 1980. It is administered by the United States Golf Association (USGA) and is recognized as a major championship by both the PGA Tour Champions and the European Senior Tour. The lower age limit was 55 in 1980, but it was lowered to 50 for the second edition in 1981, which is the standard limit for men's senior professional golf tournaments. By definition, the event is open to amateurs, but has been dominated by professionals; through 2022, all editions have been won by pros. Like other USGA championships, it has been played on many courses throughout the United States.

Bernhard Langer became the oldest U.S. Senior Open Champion in 2023, winning at the age of 65 years 10 months.

The total purse was the highest of any senior tour event until the Posco E&C Songdo Championship in South Korea, a Champions Tour event in 2010 and 2011 with a $3 million purse, but had a lower winner's share ($450,000). The U.S. Senior Open is again the highest purse on the PGA Tour Champions; in 2016 it was $3.75 million, and champion Gene Sauers earned $675,000. The purse in 2017 is anticipated to be $4 million, yielding a winner's share of $720,000.

Like other senior majors, players must walk the course unless they receive a medical exemption to use a cart. Winners gain entry into the following year's U.S. Open.

The playoff format was modified for 2018, reduced from three to two aggregate holes, followed by sudden death. The three-hole aggregate playoff was used in 2002 and 2014; the final 18-hole playoff at the U.S. Senior Open was in 1991, won by Jack Nicklaus.

== Eligibility ==
The following players are exempt from qualifying for the U.S. Senior Open, provided they are 50 years old as of the opening day of the tournament. Amateur categories require that the player is still an amateur on the opening day of the tournament, except for the one-time exemption for former champions of the U.S. Amateur or The Amateur Championship.

- Any past winner of the U.S. Senior Open
- Winners of any of the major championships in the last 10 years
- Winners of any of the U.S. Amateur in the last 10 years and runner-up in previous year
- Winners of the Senior PGA Championship in the last 10 years
- Winner of the Senior Open Championship in the last five years
- Top 15 finishers from the previous year's U.S. Senior Open
- Any amateur completing 72 holes in last U.S. Open
- Low amateur in last U.S. Senior Open
- Winner and runner-up of the U.S. Senior Amateur in the previous year
- Members of the Walker Cup and Eisenhower Trophy teams for the last two competitions
- Members of both Ryder Cup and Presidents Cup teams for the last five competitions
- Top 30 from the previous year's PGA Tour Champions money list, top 20 from current list
- Top 50 leaders from the PGA Tour Champions career money list
- Winners of PGA Tour Champions events in the previous three years
- Top six from previous year's European Senior Tour money list
- Top two from previous year's Japan Seniors Tour money list
- Winners of PGA Tour events in the previous five years
- Winners of the U.S. Open in first ten years of age eligibility
- One-time exemption for any winner of a major championship, U.S. Amateur, or British Amateur.
  - Winners of amateur championships who have since turned professional are able to use this exemption.

Special exemptions are given occasionally, and like other USGA events, many qualify through the local and sectional ranks.

== Winners ==
| Year | Winner | Score | To par | Margin of victory | Runner(s)-up | Purse ($) | Winner's share ($) | Venue | Location |
|---|---|---|---|---|---|---|---|---|---|
| 2026 | (Republic of Ireland) Pádraig Harrington (3) | 268 | −12 | 4 strokes | (United States) Stewart Cink | 4,000,000 | 800,000 | Scioto | Columbus, Ohio |
| 2025 | (Republic of Ireland) Pádraig Harrington (2) | 269 | −11 | 1 stroke | (United States) Stewart Cink | 4,000,000 | 800,000 | Broadmoor (East Course) | Colorado Springs, Colorado |
| 2024 | (England) Richard Bland | 267 | −13 | Playoff | (Japan) Hiroyuki Fujita | 4,000,000 | 720,000 | Newport | Newport, Rhode Island |
| 2023 | (Germany) Bernhard Langer (2) | 277 | −7 | 2 strokes | (United States) Steve Stricker | 4,000,000 | 720,000 | SentryWorld | Stevens Point, Wisconsin |
| 2022 | (Republic of Ireland) Pádraig Harrington | 274 | −10 | 1 stroke | (United States) Steve Stricker | 4,000,000 | 720,000 | Saucon Valley (Old Course) | Bethlehem, Pennsylvania |
| 2021 | (United States) Jim Furyk | 273 | −7 | 3 strokes | (South Africa) Retief Goosen (Canada) Mike Weir | 4,000,000 | 720,000 | Omaha | Omaha, Nebraska |
| 2020 | Canceled due to the COVID-19 pandemic | | | | | | | | |
| 2019 | (United States) Steve Stricker | 261 | −19 | 6 strokes | (United States) Jerry Kelly (United States) David Toms | 4,000,000 | 720,000 | Warren Golf Course; U of Notre Dame | South Bend, Indiana |
| 2018 | (United States) David Toms | 277 | −3 | 1 stroke | (Spain) Miguel Ángel Jiménez (United States) Jerry Kelly (United States) Tim Petrovic | 4,000,000 | 720,000 | Broadmoor (East Course) | Colorado Springs, Colorado |
| 2017 | (United States) Kenny Perry (2) | 264 | −16 | 2 strokes | (United States) Kirk Triplett | 4,000,000 | 720,000 | Salem | Peabody, Massachusetts |
| 2016 | (United States) Gene Sauers | 277 | −3 | 1 stroke | (Spain) Miguel Ángel Jiménez (United States) Billy Mayfair | 3,750,000 | 675,000 | Scioto | Columbus, Ohio |
| 2015 | (United States) Jeff Maggert | 270 | −10 | 2 strokes | (Scotland) Colin Montgomerie | 3,750,000 | 675,000 | Del Paso | Sacramento, California |
| 2014 | (Scotland) Colin Montgomerie | 279 | −5 | Playoff | (United States) Gene Sauers | 3,500,000 | 630,000 | Oak Tree National | Edmond, Oklahoma |
| 2013 | (United States) Kenny Perry | 267 | −13 | 5 strokes | (United States) Fred Funk | 2,750,000 | 500,000 | Omaha | Omaha, Nebraska |
| 2012 | (England) Roger Chapman | 270 | −10 | 2 strokes | (United States) Fred Funk (Germany) Bernhard Langer (United States) Tom Lehman (United States) Corey Pavin | 2,750,000 | 500,000 | Indianwood | Lake Orion, Michigan |
| 2011 | (United States) Olin Browne | 269 | −15 | 3 strokes | (United States) Mark O'Meara | 2,750,000 | 500,000 | Inverness Club | Toledo, Ohio |
| 2010 | (Germany) Bernhard Langer | 272 | −8 | 3 strokes | (United States) Fred Couples | 2,600,000 | 470,000 | Sahalee | Sammamish, Washington |
| 2009 | (United States) Fred Funk | 268 | −20 | 6 strokes | (United States) Joey Sindelar | 2,600,000 | 470,000 | Crooked Stick | Carmel, Indiana |
| 2008 | (Argentina) Eduardo Romero | 274 | −6 | 4 strokes | (United States) Fred Funk | 2,600,000 | 470,000 | Broadmoor (East Course) | Colorado Springs, Colorado |
| 2007 | (United States) Brad Bryant | 282 | −6 | 3 strokes | (United States) Ben Crenshaw | 2,600,000 | 470,000 | Whistling Straits (Straits Course) | Haven, Wisconsin |
| 2006 | (United States) Allen Doyle (2) | 272 | −8 | 2 strokes | (United States) Tom Watson | 2,600,000 | 470,000 | Prairie Dunes | Hutchinson, Kansas |
| 2005 | (United States) Allen Doyle | 274 | −10 | 1 stroke | (United States) Loren Roberts (United States) D. A. Weibring | 2,600,000 | 470,000 | NCR (South Course) | Kettering, Ohio |
| 2004 | (United States) Peter Jacobsen | 272 | −12 | 1 stroke | (United States) Hale Irwin | 2,600,000 | 470,000 | Bellerive | St. Louis, Missouri |
| 2003 | (United States) Bruce Lietzke | 277 | −7 | 2 strokes | (United States) Tom Watson | 2,600,000 | 470,000 | Inverness Club | Toledo, Ohio |
| 2002 | (United States) Don Pooley | 274 | −10 | Playoff | (United States) Tom Watson | 2,500,000 | 450,000 | Caves Valley | Owings Mills, Maryland |
| 2001 | (United States) Bruce Fleisher | 280 | E | 1 stroke | (Japan) Isao Aoki (United States) Gil Morgan | 2,400,000 | 430,000 | Salem | Peabody, Massachusetts |
| 2000 | (United States) Hale Irwin (2) | 267 | −17 | 3 strokes | (United States) Bruce Fleisher | 2,250,000 | 400,000 | Saucon Valley (Old Course) | Bethlehem, Pennsylvania |
| 1999 | (United States) Dave Eichelberger | 281 | −7 | 3 strokes | (United States) Ed Dougherty | 1,750,000 | 315,000 | Des Moines | West Des Moines, Iowa |
| 1998 | (United States) Hale Irwin | 285 | +1 | 1 stroke | (Argentina) Vicente Fernández | 1,500,000 | 267,500 | Riviera | Pacific Palisades, California |
| 1997 | (Australia) Graham Marsh | 280 | E | 1 stroke | (South Africa) John Bland | 1,300,000 | 232,500 | Olympia Fields (North Course) | Olympia Fields, Illinois |
| 1996 | (United States) Dave Stockton | 277 | −11 | 2 strokes | (United States) Hale Irwin | 1,200,000 | 212,500 | Canterbury | Beachwood, Ohio |
| 1995 | (United States) Tom Weiskopf | 275 | −13 | 4 strokes | (United States) Jack Nicklaus | 1,000,000 | 175,000 | Congressional (Blue Course) | Bethesda, Maryland |
| 1994 | (South Africa) Simon Hobday | 274 | −10 | 1 stroke | (United States) Jim Albus (Australia) Graham Marsh | 800,000 | 145,000 | Pinehurst Resort (No. 2 Course) | Pinehurst, North Carolina |
| 1993 | (United States) Jack Nicklaus (2) | 278 | −6 | 1 stroke | (United States) Tom Weiskopf | 700,000 | 135,330 | Cherry Hills | Cherry Hills Village, Colorado |
| 1992 | (United States) Larry Laoretti | 275 | −9 | 4 strokes | (United States) Jim Colbert | 700,000 | 130,000 | Saucon Valley (Old Course) | Bethlehem, Pennsylvania |
| 1991 | (United States) Jack Nicklaus | 282 | +2 | Playoff | (United States) Chi-Chi Rodríguez | 600,000 | 110,000 | Oakland Hills (South Course) | Bloomfield Township, Oakland County, Michigan |
| 1990 | (United States) Lee Trevino | 275 | −13 | 2 strokes | (United States) Jack Nicklaus | 500,000 | 90,000 | Ridgewood | Paramus, New Jersey |
| 1989 | (United States) Orville Moody | 279 | −9 | 2 strokes | (United States) Frank Beard | 450,000 | 80,000 | Laurel Valley | Ligonier, Pennsylvania |
| 1988 | (South Africa) Gary Player (2) | 288 | E | Playoff | (New Zealand) Bob Charles | 400,000 | 65,000 | Medinah (Course No. 3) | Medinah, Illinois |
| 1987 | (South Africa) Gary Player | 270 | −14 | 6 strokes | (United States) Doug Sanders | 300,000 | 47,000 | Brooklawn | Fairfield, Connecticut |
| 1986 | (United States) Dale Douglass | 279 | −5 | 1 stroke | (South Africa) Gary Player | 275,000 | 42,500 | Scioto | Columbus, Ohio |
| 1985 | (United States) Miller Barber (3) | 285 | −3 | 4 strokes | (Argentina) Roberto De Vicenzo | 225,000 | 40,199 | Edgewood Tahoe | Stateline, Nevada |
| 1984 | (United States) Miller Barber (2) | 286 | +6 | 2 strokes | (United States) Arnold Palmer | 200,000 | 36,448 | Oak Hill (East Course) | Pittsford, New York |
| 1983 | (United States) Billy Casper | 288 | +4 | Playoff | (United States) Rod Funseth | 175,000 | 30,566 | Hazeltine National | Chaska, Minnesota |
| 1982 | (United States) Miller Barber | 282 | −2 | 4 strokes | (United States) Gene Littler (United States) Dan Sikes | 150,000 | 28,648 | Portland | Portland, Oregon |
| 1981 | (United States) Arnold Palmer | 289 | +9 | Playoff | (United States) Billy Casper (United States) Bob Stone | 149,000 | 26,000 | Oakland Hills (South Course) | Bloomfield Township, Oakland County, Michigan |
| 1980 | (Argentina) Roberto De Vicenzo | 285 | +1 | 4 strokes | (United States) William C. Campbell (a) | 100,000 | 20,000 | Winged Foot (East Course) | Mamaroneck, New York |

== Multiple winners ==
Seven men have multiple victories in the U.S. Senior Open:

3 wins

- Miller Barber (1982, 1984, 1985)
- Pádraig Harrington (2022, 2025, 2026)

2 wins

- Gary Player (1987, 1988)
- Jack Nicklaus (1991, 1993)
- Hale Irwin (1998, 2000)
- Allen Doyle (2005, 2006)
- Kenny Perry (2013, 2017)
- Bernhard Langer (2010, 2023)

Successful defenders of the title were Barber (1985), Player (1988), Doyle (2006) and Harrington (2026)

== Winners of both U.S. Open and U.S. Senior Open ==
The following men have won both the U.S. Open and the U.S. Senior Open, the majors run by the USGA:

| Player | U.S. Open | U.S. Senior Open |
|---|---|---|
| Arnold Palmer | 1960 | 1981 |
| Billy Casper | 1959, 1966 | 1983 |
| Gary Player | 1965 | 1987, 1988 |
| Orville Moody | 1969 | 1989 |
| Lee Trevino | 1968, 1971 | 1990 |
| Jack Nicklaus | 1962, 1967, 1972, 1980 | 1991, 1993 |
| Hale Irwin | 1974, 1979, 1990 | 1998, 2000 |
| Jim Furyk | 2003 | 2021 |

Palmer (1954) and Nicklaus (1959, 1961) also won the U.S. Amateur, previously considered a major.

== Future sites ==
| Year | Edition | Venue | Location | Dates | Previous championships hosted |
|---|---|---|---|---|---|
| 2027 | 47th | Oak Tree National | Edmond, Oklahoma | July 1–4 | 2014 |
| 2028 | 48th | Crooked Stick Golf Club | Carmel, Indiana | June 29–July 2 | 2009 |
| 2029 | 49th | Prairie Dunes Country Club | Hutchinson, Kansas | TBD | 2006 |
| 2030 | 50th | Spyglass Hill Golf Course | Pebble Beach, California | TBD | |
| 2031 | 51st | Broadmoor Golf Club (East Course) | Colorado Springs, Colorado | TBD | 2008, 2018, 2025 |
| 2032 | 52nd | Saucon Valley Country Club (Old Course) | Bethlehem, Pennsylvania | TBD | 1992, 2000, 2022 |
| 2033 | 53rd | Charlotte Country Club | Charlotte, North Carolina | TBD | |
| 2034 | 54th | SentryWorld | Stevens Point, Wisconsin | TBD | 2023 |
| 2037 | 57th | Broadmoor Golf Club (East Course) | Colorado Springs, Colorado | TBD | 2008, 2018, 2025 |
| 2038 | 58th | Plainfield Country Club | Edison, New Jersey | TBD | |
| 2040 | 60th | Champions Golf Club | Houston, Texas | TBD | |
| 2041 | 61st | Salem Country Club | Peabody, Massachusetts | TBD | 2001, 2017 |
| 2042 | 62nd | Saucon Valley Country Club (Old Course) | Bethlehem, Pennsylvania | TBD | 1992, 2000, 2022 |

== See also ==
- U.S. Senior Women's Open
- Golf in the United States
