= 1981 Senior PGA Tour =

Golf tour season

1981 Senior PGA Tour season
- Duration: April 2, 1981 – December 6, 1981
- Number of official events: 7
- Most wins: (United States) Miller Barber (3)
- Money list: (United States) Miller Barber

The 1981 Senior PGA Tour was the second season of the Senior PGA Tour, the main professional golf tour in the United States for men aged 50 and over.

== Schedule ==
The following table lists official events during the 1981 season.

Date	Tournament	Location	Purse (US$)	Winner (Note: The number in parentheses after each winner's name is the number of Senior PGA Tour events they had won up to and including that tournament. This information is only shown for Senior PGA Tour members.)	Notes
Apr 5	Michelob-Egypt Temple Senior Classic	Florida	125,000	(United States) Don January (2)	New tournament
Jun 7	Eureka Federal Savings Classic	California	150,000	(United States) Don January (3)	New tournament
Jun 14	Peter Jackson Champions	Canada	200,000	(United States) Miller Barber (1)	New tournament
Jun 28	Marlboro Classic	Massachusetts	150,000	(United States) Bob Goalby (1)	New tournament
Jul 12	U.S. Senior Open	Michigan	149,000	(United States) Arnold Palmer (2)	Senior major championship
Oct 18	Suntree Seniors Classic	Florida	125,000	(United States) Miller Barber (2)	
Dec 6	PGA Seniors' Championship	Florida	125,000	(United States) Miller Barber (3)	Senior major championship. Now regarded as a 1982 major.

== Money list ==
The money list was based on prize money won during the season, calculated in U.S. dollars.

Position	Player	Prize money ($)
1	(United States) Miller Barber	83,136
2	(United States) Don January	74,175
3	(United States) Bob Goalby	66,494
4	(United States) Arnold Palmer	55,100
5	(United States) Art Wall Jr.	37,556

== Awards ==
Award	Winner	Ref.
Scoring leader (Byron Nelson Award)	(United States) Miller Barber	
