= Gene Littler =

American professional golfer (1930–2019)

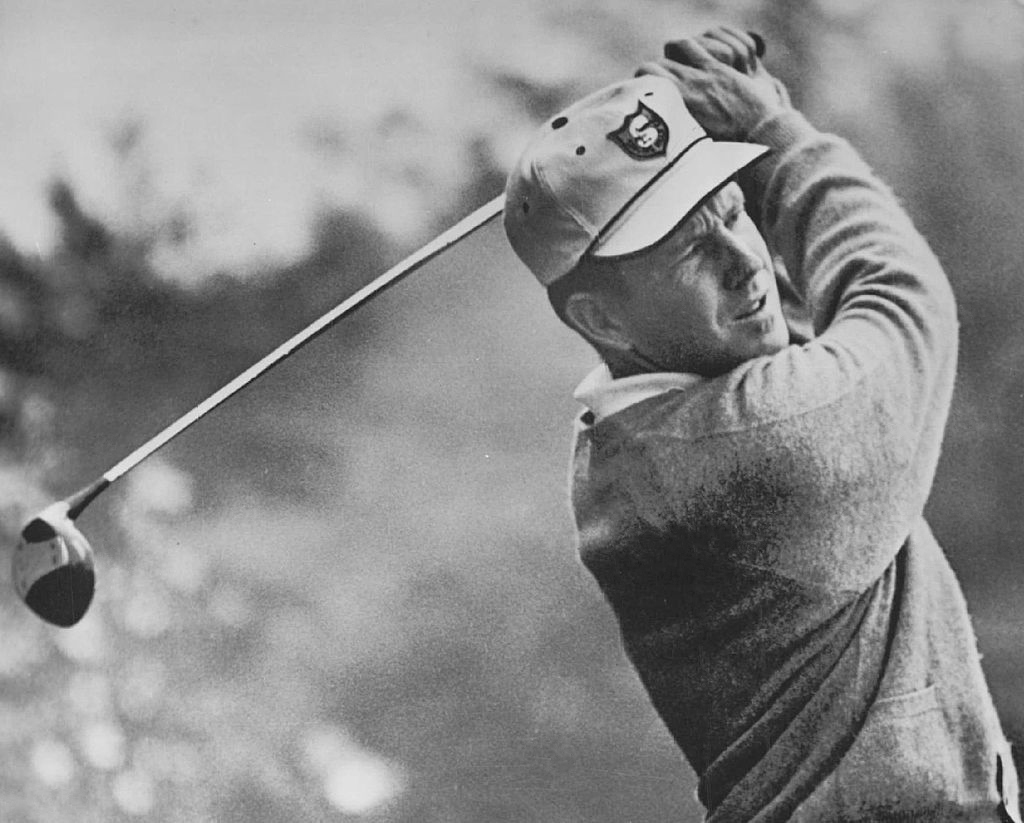
- Littler at the 1959 U.S. Open

Personal information
- Full name: Gene Alec Littler
- Nickname: The Mashine
- Nationality: United States
- Born: July 21, 1930 San Diego, California, U.S.
- Died: February 15, 2019 (aged 88) San Diego, California, U.S.
- Height: 5 ft 9 in (1.75 m)
- Weight: 155 lb (70 kg; 11.1 st)
- Spouse: Shirley Warren (m. 1951)
- Children: 2

Career
- Sport: Golf
- College: San Diego State University
- Turned professional: 1954
- Former tours: PGA Tour; Champions Tour
- Professional wins: 54

Number of wins by tour
- PGA Tour: 29
- Japan Golf Tour: 1
- PGA Tour of Australasia: 1
- PGA Tour Champions: 8
- Other: 15

Best results in major championships (wins: 2)
- Masters Tournament: 2nd: 1970
- PGA Championship: 2nd: 1977
- U.S. Open: Won: 1961
- The Open Championship: T18: 1974
- U.S. Amateur: Won: 1953

Achievements and awards
- World Golf Hall of Fame: 1990 (member page)
- Bob Jones Award: 1973

Gene Alec Littler (July 21, 1930 – February 15, 2019) was an American professional golfer and a member of the World Golf Hall of Fame. Known for a solid temperament and nicknamed "Gene the Machine" for his smooth, rhythmical swing, he once said that, "Golf is not a game of great shots. It's a game of the best misses. The people who win make the smallest mistakes."

== Early life and amateur career ==
Littler was born in San Diego, California. He played on the 1953 United States Walker Cup team, and won the U.S. Amateur and the California State Amateur that same year.

In 1954, he won a PGA Tour event as an amateur, a rare achievement which was not to be repeated until Doug Sanders won the Canadian Open in 1956. Littler is one of only very few players who won both a U.S. national junior tournament (he won the 1948 U.S. Junior Chamber of Commerce Tournament in Lincoln, Nebraska) and the U.S. Amateur.

Littler graduated from San Diego State University, and after that served in the United States Navy from 1951 to 1954.

== Professional career ==
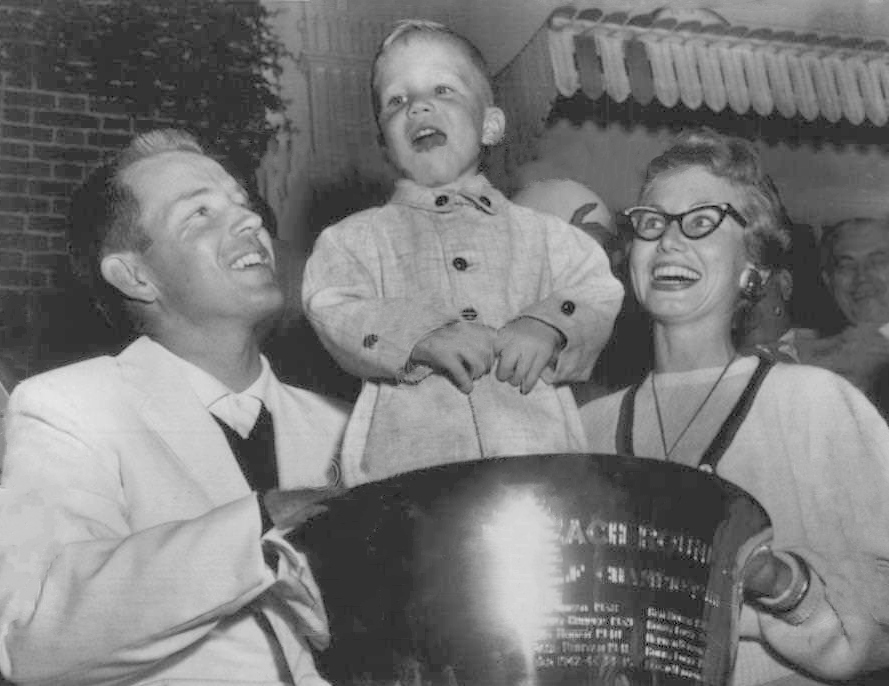
Gene Littler with family in 1956

An early highlight of Littler's professional playing career was a second-place finish at the 1954 U.S. Open. He finished one shot behind Ed Furgol.

In 1955, he won four times on the tour, but fell into a slump in the late 1950s after tinkering with his swing. In 1959 after taking advice he received from Paul Runyan and adjusting his grip, he recovered to have his best year with five PGA Tour victories. He finished second on the money list that year, which was to remain his career best. Only once from 1954 to 1979 did Littler finish out of the top 60 on the final money list. He was stricken with melanoma cancer found in a lymph node under his left arm in 1972, but came back to win five more times on the PGA Tour. He won many championships including 29 PGA Tour wins. He played on the Men's Senior PGA Tour and also won two major tournaments in Japan and one in Australia. In his book, Gene Littler The Real Score with Jack Tobin an Appendix B states that "through the 1975 season only eight players in the history of golf had earned over $1 Million in sanctioned professional golf play" (listed in order the eight were Jack Nicklaus, Arnold Palmer, Billy Casper, Lee Trevino, Bruce Crampton, Tom Weiskopf, Gene Littler, Gary Player).

One of Littler's 29 PGA Tour wins was unique. When he won the 1975 Bing Crosby National Pro-Am, it marked the first and (so far) only time that a player won that event as a professional after having previously won the pro-amateur portion, which Littler did as a 23-year-old amateur in 1954.

Littler won one major championship – the 1961 U.S. Open. He shot a 68 in the final round to overtake Doug Sanders. He accumulated 17 top-10 finishes in the three U.S.-based majors: seven at the Masters Tournament, five at the PGA Championship, and five at the U.S. Open. In addition to his U.S. Open victory, he had one second-place finish in each of the three U.S. majors, losing playoffs to Billy Casper at the 1970 Masters and to Lanny Wadkins at the 1977 PGA Championship. The latter was the first-ever sudden-death playoff in a major. He was a member of the U.S. Ryder Cup teams of 1961, 1963, 1965, 1967, 1969, 1971 and 1975, and had a 14-5-8 win/loss/tie record including five wins and three ties in 10 singles matches.

After he turned 50, Littler also played on the Senior PGA Tour, winning eight times.

== Personal life ==
On January 5, 1951, ten days before joining the Navy, Littler married Shirley Warren, his university classmate. They had a son, Curt, born in March 1954 and a daughter, Suzanne, born in October 1957.

Littler died at the age of 88 on February 15, 2019.

== Awards and honors ==
- In 1973, Littler was bestowed the Ben Hogan Award, given to a golfer for a courageous comeback from injury or illness. Littler earned this after returning to the tour following treatment for melanoma.
- In 1973, he was honored with the Bob Jones Award, the highest honor given by the United States Golf Association in recognition of distinguished sportsmanship in golf.
- In 1990, Littler was inducted into the World Golf Hall of Fame.

== In popular culture ==
Littler inspired Sandy Mac Divot, the main character of the long running comic strip Mac Divot by Jordan Lanski (a former schoolmate of Littler) and Mel Keefer.

== Professional wins (54) ==
=== PGA Tour wins (29) ===
Legend
Major championships (1)
Other PGA Tour (28)

No.	Date	Tournament	Winning score	Margin of victory	Runner(s)-up
1	Jan 21, 1954	San Diego Open (as an amateur)	−14 (67-66-69-72=274)	4 strokes	(United States) Dutch Harrison
2	Jan 9, 1955	Los Angeles Open	−8 (72-67-68-69=276)	2 strokes	(United States) Ted Kroll
3	Feb 6, 1955	Phoenix Open	−5 (66-70-68-71=275)	1 stroke	(United States) Billy Maxwell, (United States) Arnold Palmer
4	May 1, 1955	Tournament of Champions	−8 (69-71-68-72=280)	13 strokes	(United States) Jerry Barber, (United States) Pete Cooper, (United States) Bob Toski
5	Aug 28, 1955	Labatt Open	−8 (67-69-68-68=272)	Playoff	(Canada) Stan Leonard
6	Feb 19, 1956	Texas Open Invitational	−12 (68-73-70-65=276)	2 strokes	(United States) Mike Fetchick, (United States) Frank Stranahan, (United States) Ernie Vossler
7	Apr 29, 1956	Tournament of Champions (2)	−7 (70-71-69-71=281)	4 strokes	(United States) Cary Middlecoff
8	Jun 10, 1956	Palm Beach Round Robin	+55 pts (69-69-68-68-70=344)	24 points	(United States) Ted Kroll
9	Apr 21, 1957	Tournament of Champions (3)	−3 (73-73-69-70=285)	3 strokes	(United States) Billy Casper, (United States) Jimmy Demaret, (United States) Dow Finsterwald, (United States) Billy Maxwell
10	Feb 8, 1959	Phoenix Open Invitational (2)	−12 (67-63-67-71=268)	1 stroke	(United States) Art Wall Jr.
11	Feb 15, 1959	Tucson Open Invitational	−14 (65-67-68-66=266)	1 stroke	(United States) Joe Campbell, (United States) Art Wall Jr.
12	May 17, 1959	Arlington Hotel Open	−18 (67-69-64-70=270)	1 stroke	(United States) Jim Ferree
13	Jul 19, 1959	Insurance City Open Invitational	−12 (64-66-72-70=272)	1 stroke	(United States) Tom Nieporte
14	Aug 30, 1959	Miller Open Invitational	−15 (68-66-64-67=265)	1 stroke	(United States) Bob Rosburg, (United States) Bo Wininger
15	Jun 12, 1960	Oklahoma City Open Invitational	−11 (71-64-70-68=273)	1 stroke	(United States) Art Wall Jr.
16	Jul 31, 1960	Eastern Open Invitational	−15 (65-68-73-67=273)	2 strokes	(South Africa) Gary Player
17	Jun 17, 1961	U.S. Open	+1 (73-68-72-68=281)	1 stroke	(United States) Bob Goalby, (United States) Doug Sanders
18	Jan 28, 1962	Lucky International Open	−10 (65-68-68-73=274)	2 strokes	(Canada) George Knudson
19	Jun 10, 1962	Thunderbird Classic Invitational	−13 (67-71-70-67=275)	2 strokes	(United States) Jack Nicklaus
20	Jul 17, 1965	Canadian Open	−7 (70-68-69-66=273)	1 stroke	(United States) Jack Nicklaus
21	Feb 16, 1969	Phoenix Open Invitational (3)	−21 (69-66-62-66=263)	2 strokes	(United States) Miller Barber, (United States) Don January, (United States) Billy Maxwell
22	Apr 6, 1969	Greater Greensboro Open	−10 (66-70-69-69=274)	Playoff	(United States) Julius Boros, (United States) Orville Moody, (United States) Tom Weiskopf
23	Apr 18, 1971	Monsanto Open	−8 (71-67-71-67=276)	3 strokes	(United States) George Archer, (United States) Pete Brown
24	May 23, 1971	Colonial National Invitation	+3 (72-68-74-69=283)	1 stroke	(United States) Bert Yancey
25	Jul 22, 1973	St. Louis Children's Hospital Golf Classic	−12 (66-66-68-68=268)	1 stroke	(Australia) Bruce Crampton
26	Jan 26, 1975	Bing Crosby National Pro-Am	−8 (68-71-68-73=280)	4 strokes	(United States) Hubert Green
27	May 25, 1975	Danny Thomas Memphis Classic	−18 (67-68-69-66=270)	5 strokes	(United States) John Mahaffey
28	Aug 3, 1975	Westchester Classic	−17 (68-68-69-66=271)	Playoff	(United States) Julius Boros
29	May 1, 1977	Houston Open	−12 (70-65-67-74=276)	3 strokes	(United States) Lanny Wadkins

PGA Tour playoff record (3–8)

No.	Year	Tournament	Opponent(s)	Result
1	1955	Labatt Open	(Canada) Stan Leonard	Won with par on first extra hole
2	1956	Texas International Open	(United States) Cary Middlecoff, (Australia) Peter Thomson	Thomson won with birdie on second extra hole
3	1957	Western Open	(United States) George Bayer, (United States) Doug Ford, (United States) Billy Maxwell	Ford won with par on third extra hole Littler and Maxwell eliminated by par on first hole
4	1960	Memphis Open Invitational	(United States) Tommy Bolt, (United States) Ben Hogan	Bolt won 18-hole playoff; Bolt: −2 (68), Hogan: −1 (69), Littler: +1 (71)
5	1962	Memphis Open Invitational	(United States) Lionel Hebert, (South Africa) Gary Player	Hebert won with birdie on first extra hole
6	1966	Tucson Open	(United States) Joe Campbell	Lost to birdie on first extra hole
7	1969	Greater Greensboro Open	(United States) Julius Boros, (United States) Orville Moody, (United States) Tom Weiskopf	Won with birdie on fifth extra hole Weiskopf eliminated by par on first hole
8	1970	Masters Tournament	(United States) Billy Casper	Lost 18-hole playoff; Casper: −3 (69), Littler: +2 (74)
9	1975	Westchester Classic	(United States) Julius Boros	Won with par on first extra hole
10	1977	Joe Garagiola-Tucson Open	(United States) Bruce Lietzke	Lost to birdie on fourth extra hole
11	1977	PGA Championship	(United States) Lanny Wadkins	Lost to par on third extra hole

=== PGA of Japan Tour wins (1) ===
No.	Date	Tournament	Winning score	Margin of victory	Runners-up
1	Oct 12, 1975	Taiheiyo Club Masters	−6 (69-66-73-70=278)	1 stroke	(United States) Lee Elder, (United States) Hubert Green, (United States) Allen Miller, (Japan) Masashi Ozaki

=== PGA Tour of Australia wins (1) ===
No.	Date	Tournament	Winning score	Margin of victory	Runner-up
1	Mar 2, 1980	Australian Masters	−4 (70-74-67-77=288)	Playoff	(Australia) Rodger Davis

PGA Tour of Australasia playoff record (1–0)

No.	Year	Tournament	Opponent	Result
1	1980	Australian Masters	(Australia) Rodger Davis	Won with bogey on first extra hole

=== Other wins (3) ===
- 1954 California State Open
- 1966 World Series of Golf
- 1974 Taiheiyo Club Masters

=== Senior PGA Tour wins (8) ===
No.	Date	Tournament	Winning score	Margin of victory	Runner(s)-up
1	Mar 20, 1983	Greater Daytona Senior Classic	−13 (65-70-68=203)	6 strokes	(England) Guy Wolstenholme
2	Jul 10, 1983	Greater Syracuse Senior's Pro Classic	−9 (69-69-70-67=275)	2 strokes	(United States) Don January
3	Jan 4, 1984	Seiko-Tucson Senior Match Play Championship	1 up		(United States) Don January
4	May 4, 1986	Sunwest Bank Charley Pride Senior Golf Classic	−14 (65-66-71=202)	2 strokes	(United States) Don January
5	Aug 31, 1986	Bank One Senior Golf Classic	−12 (71-63-67=201)	Playoff	(United States) Miller Barber, (United States) Bob Goalby
6	Aug 2, 1987	NYNEX/Golf Digest Commemorative	−10 (67-68-65=200)	1 stroke	(United States) Dale Douglass
7	Nov 22, 1987	Gus Machado Senior Classic	−6 (71-67-69=207)	3 strokes	(United States) Orville Moody
8	Feb 26, 1989	Aetna Challenge	−7 (70-70-69=209)	2 strokes	(South Africa) Harold Henning

Senior PGA Tour playoff record (1–2)

No.	Year	Tournament	Opponent(s)	Result
1	1981	Peter Jackson Champions	(United States) Miller Barber	Lost to par on first extra hole
2	1986	Greater Grand Rapids Open	(United States) Jim Ferree, (United States) Chi-Chi Rodríguez	Ferree won with birdie on first extra hole
3	1986	Bank One Senior Golf Classic	(United States) Miller Barber, (United States) Bob Goalby	Won with par on third extra hole Goalby eliminated by par on first hole

=== Japan Senior Tour wins (2) ===
- 1983 Coca-Cola Grandslam Championship
- 1987 Coca-Cola Grandslam Championship

=== Other senior wins (10) ===
- 1980 World Senior Invitational
- 1981 Vintage Invitational
- 1981 Liberty Mutual Legends of Golf (with Bob Rosburg)
- 1983 Vintage Invitational
- 1985 Liberty Mutual Legends of Golf (with Don January)
- 1986 Liberty Mutual Legends of Golf (with Don January)
- 1994 Liberty Mutual Legends of Golf - Legendary Division (with Don January)
- 1997 Liberty Mutual Legends of Golf - Legendary Division (with Don January)
- 2001 Liberty Mutual Legends of Golf - Demaret Division (with Don January)
- 2004 Liberty Mutual Legends of Golf - Demaret Division (with Don January)

== Major championships ==
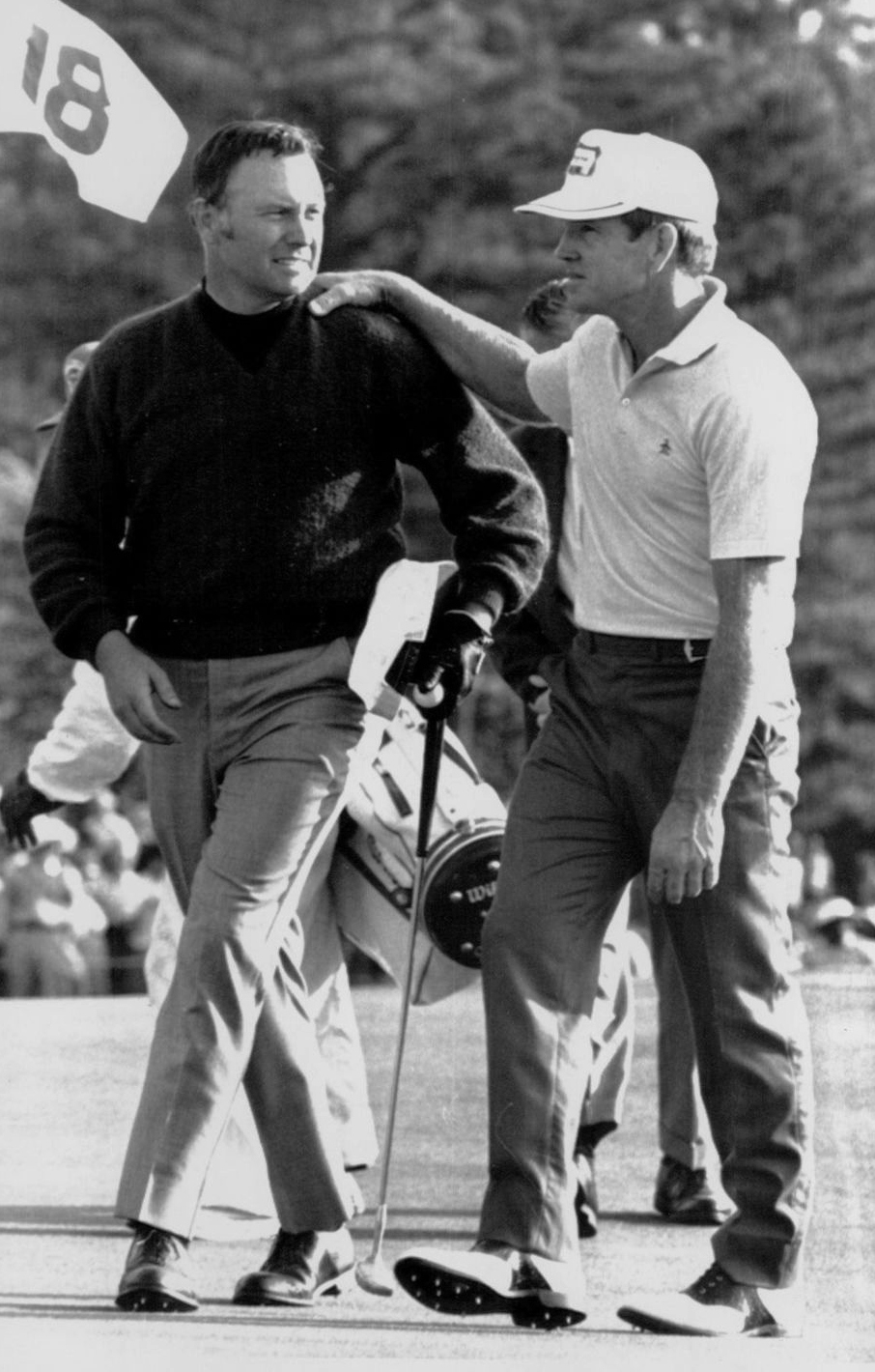
Gene Littler (right) congratulates Billy Casper with winning the 1970 Masters Tournament

=== Wins (1) ===
Year	Championship	54 holes	Winning score	Margin	Runners-up
1961	U.S. Open	3 shot deficit	+1 (73-68-72-68=281)	1 stroke	(United States) Bob Goalby, (United States) Doug Sanders

=== Amateur wins (1) ===
Year	Championship	Winning score	Runner-up
1953	U.S. Amateur	1 up	(United States) Dale Morey

=== Results timeline ===
Tournament	1950	1951	1952	1953	1954	1955	1956	1957	1958	1959
Masters Tournament					T22	T22	T12	CUT	42	T8
U.S. Open					2	15	T34	T32	4	T11
The Open Championship										
PGA Championship								R64		T10
U.S. Amateur	R64		QF	1	–	–	–	–	–	–

Tournament	1960	1961	1962	1963	1964	1965	1966	1967	1968	1969
Masters Tournament	CUT	T15	4	T24	T13	T6	T44	T26	T43	T8
U.S. Open	CUT	1	T8	T21	T11	T8	T48	CUT		CUT
The Open Championship			CUT							
PGA Championship	T18	T5	T23	T34	T33	T28	T3	T7	T30	T48

Tournament	1970	1971	1972	1973	1974	1975	1976	1977	1978	1979
Masters Tournament	2	T4		T17	T39	T22	T12	T8	T24	T10
U.S. Open	T12	T37		T18	CUT	T49	T50		T35	CUT
The Open Championship					T18	CUT	T32			
PGA Championship	T4	T75		CUT	T28	T7	T22	2	CUT	T16

Tournament	1980	1981	1982	1983
Masters Tournament	49			
U.S. Open	T38		T22	
The Open Championship				
PGA Championship	CUT	CUT	T49	CUT

Win
Top 10
Did not play

CUT = missed the halfway cut
DQ = disqualified
WD = withdrew
R64, R32, R16, QF, SF = Round in which player lost in match play
"T" indicates a tie for a place.

Source for U.S. Open and U.S. Amateur: USGA Championship Database

=== Summary ===
Tournament	Wins	2nd	3rd	Top-5	Top-10	Top-25	Events	Cuts made
Masters Tournament	0	1	0	3	8	18	26	24
U.S. Open	1	1	0	3	5	12	25	20
The Open Championship	0	0	0	0	0	1	4	2
PGA Championship	0	1	1	4	7	11	25	20
Totals	1	3	1	10	20	42	80	66

- Most consecutive cuts made – 14 (1962 PGA – 1967 Masters)
- Longest streak of top-10s – 4 (1961 U.S. Open – 1962 U.S. Open)

== U.S. national team appearances ==
Amateur

- Walker Cup: 1953 (winners)

Professional

- Ryder Cup: 1961 (winners), 1963 (winners), 1965 (winners), 1967 (winners), 1969 (tie), 1971 (winners), 1975 (winners)
- Hopkins Trophy: 1956 (winners)

== See also ==
- List of golfers with most PGA Tour wins
