= Dan Sikes =

American professional golfer (1929–1987

Personal information
- Full name: Daniel David Sikes, Jr.
- Nickname: "The Golfing Lawyer"
- Nationality: United States
- Born: December 7, 1929 Wildwood, Florida, U.S.
- Died: December 20, 1987 (aged 58) Jacksonville, Florida, U.S.

Career
- Sport: Golf
- College: University of Florida
- Turned professional: 1960
- Former tours: PGA Tour; Champions Tour
- Professional wins: 9

Number of wins by tour
- PGA Tour: 6
- PGA Tour Champions: 3

Best results in major championships
- Masters Tournament: 5th: 1965
- PGA Championship: T3: 1967
- U.S. Open: 10th: 1963
- The Open Championship: DNP

Daniel David Sikes, Jr. (December 7, 1929 – December 20, 1987) was an American professional golfer. He played on the PGA Tour and Champions Tour. Sikes won six PGA Tour events. He was influential as the chairman of the tournament players committee in the late 1960s, prior to the formation of the PGA Tour.

== Early life ==
Sikes was born in Wildwood, Florida and was raised in Jacksonville. He attended Andrew Jackson High School.

== Amateur career ==
Sikes enrolled at the University of Florida in Gainesville, where he played for the Florida Gators' golf team in National Collegiate Athletic Association (NCAA) competition from 1951 to 1953. He was recognized as an All-American in 1952—the University of Florida's first All-American golfer. Sikes graduated from Florida with a bachelor's degree in business administration in 1953.

Although he later earned a law degree from the university's College of Law and was known as the "golfing lawyer," he never actually practiced law. He was the chairman and spokesman of the controversial tournament players' committee prior to the formation of the "Tournament Players Division" in late 1968, which was later renamed the PGA Tour.

Sikes won the U.S. Amateur Public Links championship in 1958 while in law school.

== Professional career ==
In 1960, Sikes turned professional. He won six tournaments on the PGA Tour, half in his home state of Florida. Sikes' career year was 1967, when he won two events and was fifth on the money list. He was also the 54-hole leader at the PGA Championship and finished one shot out of the playoff, in a tie for third with Jack Nicklaus. Due to disputes with the PGA of America, the championship was nearly boycotted by the top tournament players. Sikes played on the Ryder Cup team in 1969 at Royal Birkdale.

Sikes later represented caddies on tour in 1970. He was also highly instrumental in helping organize the Senior PGA Tour. He won three times on the senior tour: the first at the rain-shortened Hilton Head Seniors International in 1982 which Sikes and Miller Barber were leading when play was stopped.

== Personal life ==
In 1987, Sikes died in Jacksonville at the age of 58 due complications from stomach surgery.

== Awards and honors ==
- Sikes was inducted into the University of Florida Athletic Hall of Fame as a "Gator Great"
- In 1988, Sikes was posthumously inducted into the Jacksonville Sports Hall of Fame in 1988

== Professional wins (9) ==
=== PGA Tour wins (6) ===
No.	Date	Tournament	Winning score	To par	Margin of victory	Runner-up
1	Mar 24, 1963	Doral C.C. Open Invitational	76-70-67-70=283	−5	1 stroke	(United States) Sam Snead
2	Jun 13, 1965	Cleveland Open Invitational	68-70-68-66=272	−12	1 stroke	(United States) Tony Lema
3	Mar 19, 1967	Jacksonville Open	67-69-70-73=279	−9	1 stroke	(United States) Bill Collins
4	Sep 17, 1967	Philadelphia Golf Classic	71-68-69-68=276	−12	2 strokes	(United States) George Archer
5	Mar 17, 1968	Florida Citrus Open Invitational	71-67-70-66=274	−14	1 stroke	(United States) Tom Weiskopf
6	Jul 28, 1968	Minnesota Golf Classic	71-66-71-64=272	−12	1 stroke	(United States) Ken Still

PGA Tour playoff record (0–2)

No.	Year	Tournament	Opponent(s)	Result
1	1962	Houston Classic	(United States) Bobby Nichols, (United States) Jack Nicklaus	Nichols won with eagle on first extra hole after 18-hole playoff; Nichols: +1 (71), Sikes: +1 (71), Nicklaus: +6 (76)
2	1973	Byron Nelson Golf Classic	(United States) Lanny Wadkins	Lost to par on first extra hole

=== Senior PGA Tour wins (3) ===
No.	Date	Tournament	Winning score	To par	Margin of victory	Runner-up
1	Oct 24, 1982	Hilton Head Seniors International	69-69=138 (Note: Shortened to 36 holes due to weather.)	−6	Shared title with (United States) Miller Barber	
2	Jun 3, 1984	Gatlin Brothers Seniors Golf Classic	69-73-68=210	−6	1 stroke	(United States) Rod Funseth
3	Sep 9, 1984	United Virginia Bank Seniors	67-69-71=207	−9	1 stroke	(United States) Lee Elder

Senior PGA Tour playoff record (0–2)

No.	Year	Tournament	Opponents	Result
1	1984	Daytona Beach Seniors Golf Classic	(United States) Orville Moody, (United States) Arnold Palmer	Moody won with birdie on second extra hole
2	1985	Citizens Union Senior Golf Classic	(United States) Lee Elder, (United States) Orville Moody, (United States) Walt Zembriski	Elder won with birdie on third extra hole Moody eliminated by birdie on second hole

== Results in major championships ==
Tournament	1962	1963	1964	1965	1966	1967	1968	1969	1970	1971	1972	1973	1974	1975
Masters Tournament		T15	T13	5	T36		T35	12	T36	CUT			T15	CUT
U.S. Open	T36	10	T44	T36			15	T38	T27					
PGA Championship		T47		T45	T28	T3	T8	T25	T18	T46	T13	T6	T74	

Note: Sikes never played in The Open Championship.

Top 10
Did not play

CUT = missed the half-way cut
"T" indicates a tie for a place

=== Summary ===
Tournament	Wins	2nd	3rd	Top-5	Top-10	Top-25	Events	Cuts made
Masters Tournament	0	0	0	1	1	5	10	8
U.S. Open	0	0	0	0	1	2	7	7
The Open Championship	0	0	0	0	0	0	0	0
PGA Championship	0	0	1	1	3	6	11	11
Totals	0	0	1	2	5	13	28	26

- Most consecutive cuts made – 21 (1962 U.S. Open – 1970 PGA)
- Longest streak of top-10s – 1 (five times)

== See also ==
- List of American Ryder Cup golfers
- List of Florida Gators men's golfers on the PGA Tour
- List of Levin College of Law graduates
- List of University of Florida alumni
- List of University of Florida Athletic Hall of Fame members
