= The Greenbrier American Express Championship =

Golf tournament

Tournament information
- Location: White Sulphur Springs, West Virginia, U.S.
- Established: 1985
- Course: The Greenbrier
- Par: 72
- Length: 6,709 yards (6,135 m)
- Tour: Senior PGA Tour
- Format: Stroke play - 54 holes (no cut)
- Prize fund: $225,000
- Month played: July
- Final year: 1987

Tournament record score
- Aggregate: 200 Don January (1985); 200 Bruce Crampton (1987)
- To par: −16 as above

Final champion
- (Australia) Bruce Crampton

Location in the United States
Location in West Virginia

The Greenbrier American Express Championship was a professional golf tournament on the Senior PGA Tour (now PGA Tour Champions). Held from 1985 through 1987 in West Virginia, the 54-hole event was played in July at The Greenbrier resort near White Sulphur Springs.

The inaugural event was played Thursday through Saturday, starting on the Fourth of July. Don January won the first two editions, the second in a sudden-death playoff. Bruce Crampton opened with a 63 and won the final tournament in 1987 by six strokes, tying January's scoring record of 200 (–16).

The PGA Tour returned to the resort in 2010 with its Greenbrier Classic.

== Results ==
Year	Dates	Winner	Score	To par	Margin of victory	Runner-up	Purse ($)	Winner's share ($)	Notes
1987	Jul 3–5	(Australia) Bruce Crampton	63-70-67=200	−16	6 strokes	(United States) Orville Moody	225,000	34,000	
1986	Jul 11–13	(United States) Don January (2)	70-66-71=207	−9	Playoff	(United States) Jim Ferree	200,000	30,000	
1985	Jul 4–6	(United States) Don January	70-64-66=200	−16	2 strokes	(United States) Lee Elder	200,000	30,000	

- All events played at The Greenbrier; playoff in 1986 was won with a par on the first extra hole.
