= Don January =

American professional golfer (1929–2023)

Personal information
- Full name: Donald Ray January
- Nickname: Bones
- Nationality: United States
- Born: November 20, 1929 Plainview, Texas, U.S.
- Died: May 7, 2023 (aged 93) Dallas, Texas, U.S.
- Spouse: Patricia
- Children: 3

Career
- Sport: Golf
- College: North Texas State College
- Turned professional: 1956
- Former tours: PGA Tour; Senior PGA Tour
- Professional wins: 45

Number of wins by tour
- PGA Tour: 10
- PGA Tour Champions: 22 (Tied-7th all-time)
- Other: 13

Best results in major championships (wins: 1)
- Masters Tournament: T4: 1971
- PGA Championship: Won: 1967
- U.S. Open: 3rd: 1967
- The Open Championship: DNP

Achievements and awards
- Vardon Trophy: 1976
- Senior PGA Tour money list winner: 1980, 1983, 1984
- Senior PGA Tour Byron Nelson Award: 1980, 1982, 1983, 1984, 1985

Donald Ray January (November 20, 1929 – May 7, 2023) was an American professional golfer, best known for winning the 1967 PGA Championship.

== Early life ==
Born in Plainview, Texas, January graduated from Sunset High School in Dallas. He was a member of the North Texas State golf team that won four consecutive NCAA Division I titles from 1949 to 1952. January is a member of the Sunset High School Hall of Fame.

While in college as a sophomore, as part of his scholarship, January helped teach a beginning golf class, where he met his future wife, Patricia "Pat" Rushing. They both graduated in 1953 and eloped to Ardmore, Oklahoma. They lived in San Antonio while Don was in the Air Force, and began their family—two boys and a girl.

== Professional career ==
January won 10 PGA Tour titles, though never more than one in a year, with his most notable at the 1967 PGA Championship, an 18-hole playoff victory over Don Massengale. January had lost the 1961 PGA Championship in a playoff to Jerry Barber when his 68, the lowest losing score ever in an 18-hole playoff for a major championship, was bested by Barber's 67. He won the Vardon Trophy for lowest scoring average in 1976 at the age of 47. He was a member of the U.S. Ryder Cup team in both 1965 and 1977.

January was responsible for a change to the rules of golf. During the 1963 Phoenix Open, January had a putt roll up to the lip of the hole and stop. January claimed that the ball was still moving, and waited for seven minutes for the ball to drop (it never did). Rule 16-2 was revised in 1964 to state that players had to tap the ball in within ten seconds or be penalized.

In the period between his last PGA Tour win and the start of the Senior PGA Tour, January devoted most of his professional efforts to a golf course design business, JanMart Enterprises, which he established with fellow Texan and PGA Tour golfer Billy Martindale.

January is well known for his success on the Senior PGA Tour (now the PGA Tour Champions), winning 22 events including two PGA Seniors' Championships. In 1980, he won the first official event on the Senior PGA Tour—the Atlantic City Senior International.

The Don January Golf Classic is a golf tournament played annually in the spring that was established to honor him in 1990 by his alma mater, now known as the University of North Texas.

January appeared as himself on the March 6, 1961 episode of the game show To Tell the Truth. He received two votes.

== Death ==
January died at his home in Dallas on May 7, 2023, at the age of 93.

== Professional wins (45) ==
=== PGA Tour wins (10) ===
Legend
Major championships (1)
Other PGA Tour (9)

No.	Date	Tournament	Winning score	Margin of victory	Runner(s)-up
1	May 27, 1956	Dallas Centennial Open	−12 (64-67-70-67=268)	1 stroke	(United States) Dow Finsterwald, (United States) Doug Ford
2	Feb 21, 1960	Tucson Open Invitational	−9 (67-67-68-69=271)	3 strokes	(United States) Bob Harris
3	Jul 9, 1961	St. Paul Open Invitational	−19 (66-71-68-64=269)	1 stroke	(United States) Buster Cupit
4	Feb 17, 1963	Tucson Open Invitational (2)	−22 (65-67-69-65=266)	11 strokes	(United States) Gene Littler, (United States) Phil Rodgers
5	Aug 28, 1966	Philadelphia Golf Classic	−10 (69-69-69-71=278)	1 stroke	(United States) Jack Nicklaus
6	Jul 24, 1967	PGA Championship	−7 (71-72-70-68=281)	Playoff	(United States) Don Massengale
7	Apr 21, 1968	Tournament of Champions	−8 (70-68-69-69=276)	1 stroke	(United States) Julius Boros
8	Mar 23, 1970	Greater Jacksonville Open	−9 (68-75-70-66=279)	Playoff	(United States) Dale Douglass
9	Oct 19, 1975	San Antonio Texas Open	−13 (71-67-71-66=275)	Playoff	(United States) Larry Hinson
10	Apr 18, 1976	MONY Tournament of Champions (2)	−11 (71-68-69-69=277)	5 strokes	(United States) Hubert Green

PGA Tour playoff record (3–5)

No.	Year	Tournament	Opponent(s)	Result
1	1956	Western Open	(United States) Mike Fetchick, (United States) Doug Ford, (United States) Jay Hebert	Fetchick won 18-hole playoff; Fetchick: −6 (66), Hebert: −1 (71), Ford: E (72), January: +3 (75)
2	1961	PGA Championship	(United States) Jerry Barber	Lost 18-hole playoff; Barber: −3 (67), January: −2 (68)
3	1964	Lucky International Open	(United States) Chi-Chi Rodríguez	Lost 18-hole playoff; Rodríguez: −1 (70), January: E (71)
4	1967	PGA Championship	(United States) Don Massengale	Won 18-hole playoff; January: −3 (69), Massengale: −1 (71)
5	1969	Kaiser International Open Invitational	(United States) George Archer, (United States) Billy Casper, (United States) Jack Nicklaus	Nicklaus won with birdie on second extra hole January eliminated by birdie on first hole
6	1970	Greater Jacksonville Open	(United States) Dale Douglass	Won 18-hole playoff; January: −3 (69), Douglass: E (72)
7	1971	Houston Champions International	(United States) Hubert Green	Lost to birdie on first extra hole
8	1975	San Antonio Texas Open	(United States) Larry Hinson	Won with birdie on second extra hole

=== Other wins (2) ===
This list may be incomplete

- 1956 Apple Valley Clambake
- 1959 Valencia Open Invitational

=== Senior PGA Tour wins (22) ===
Legend
Senior major championships (1)
Other Senior PGA Tour (21)

No.	Date	Tournament	Winning score	Margin of victory	Runner(s)-up
1	Jun 22, 1980	Atlantic City Senior International	−5 (68-71-69=208)	2 strokes	(United States) Mike Souchak
2	Apr 5, 1981	Michelob-Egypt Temple Senior Classic	−8 (71-70-72-67=280)	Playoff	(United States) Doug Ford
3	Jun 7, 1981	Eureka Federal Savings Classic	−5 (71-69-68=208)	2 strokes	(United States) Bob Goalby
4	Apr 4, 1982	Michelob Senior Classic (2)	−10 (73-69-67-69=278)	3 strokes	(United States) Dow Finsterwald
5	Dec 5, 1982	PGA Seniors' Championship	E (74-75-69-70=288)	1 stroke	(United States) Julius Boros
6	Jun 5, 1983	Gatlin Brothers Seniors Golf Classic	−8 (71-67-68=208)	Playoff	(United States) Billy Casper
7	Jun 26, 1983	Peter Jackson Champions	−10 (68-67-71-68=274)	2 strokes	(United States) Miller Barber
8	Jul 3, 1983	Marlboro Classic	−11 (69-72-68-64=273)	3 strokes	(United States) Miller Barber, (United States) Gay Brewer
9	Aug 21, 1983	Denver Post Champions of Golf	−17 (70-65-67-69=271)	4 strokes	(United States) Billy Casper, (United States) Doug Sanders
10	Sep 4, 1983	Citizens Union Senior Golf Classic	−19 (67-67-65-70=269)	3 strokes	(United States) Bob Stone
11	Oct 16, 1983	Suntree Classic	−14 (69-66-68-71=274)	3 strokes	(United States) Arnold Palmer
12	Mar 25, 1984	Vintage Invitational	−8 (70-72-72-66=280)	4 strokes	(United States) Miller Barber
13	Aug 12, 1984	du Maurier Champions (2)	−19 (65-63-66=194)	5 strokes	(United States) Miller Barber, (United States) Lee Elder
14	Sep 23, 1984	Digital Middlesex Classic (2)	−7 (70-70-69=209)	4 strokes	(United States) Orville Moody
15	Mar 24, 1985	Senior PGA Tour Roundup	−18 (65-69-64=198)	3 strokes	(United States) Gene Littler
16	May 12, 1985	Dominion Seniors	−10 (69-70-67=206)	2 strokes	(United States) Gay Brewer
17	May 19, 1985	United Hospitals Senior Golf Championship	−5 (69-66=135) (Note: Shortened to 36 holes due to weather.)	5 strokes	(Canada) Al Balding
18	Jul 7, 1985	The Greenbrier American Express Championship	−16 (70-64-66=200)	2 strokes	(United States) Lee Elder
19	Jun 8, 1986	Senior Players Reunion Pro-Am	−13 (66-68-69=203)	2 strokes	(United States) Chi-Chi Rodríguez
20	Jul 13, 1986	The Greenbrier American Express Championship (2)	−9 (70-66-71-207)	Playoff	(United States) Jim Ferree
21	Nov 2, 1986	Seiko-Tucson Senior Match Play Championship	E (70)	1 stroke	(New Zealand) Bob Charles
22	Jan 10, 1987	MONY Senior Tournament of Champions	−1 (67-72-73-75=287)	Playoff	(United States) Butch Baird

Senior PGA Tour playoff record (4–1)

No.	Year	Tournament	Opponent(s)	Result
1	1981	Michelob-Egypt Temple Senior Classic	(United States) Doug Ford	Won with birdie on first extra hole
2	1983	Gatlin Brothers Seniors Golf Classic	(United States) Billy Casper	Won with par on fifth extra hole
3	1985	Digital Seniors Classic	(United States) Jerry Barber, (United States) Lee Elder	Elder won with birdie on first extra hole
4	1986	The Greenbrier American Express Championship	(United States) Jim Ferree	Won with par on first extra hole
5	1987	MONY Senior Tournament of Champions	(United States) Butch Baird	Won with birdie on fourth extra hole

=== Other senior wins (12) ===
- 1979 PGA Seniors' Championship
- 1980 Australian Seniors Championship
- 1982 Liberty Mutual Legends of Golf (with Sam Snead)
- 1984 Shootout at Jeremy Ranch (with Mike Sullivan)
- 1985 Liberty Mutual Legends of Golf (with Gene Littler), Mazda Champions (with Alice Miller)
- 1986 Liberty Mutual Legends of Golf (with Gene Littler)
- 1993 Liberty Mutual Legends of Golf – Legendary Division
- 1994 Liberty Mutual Legends of Golf – Legendary Division (with Gene Littler)
- 1997 Liberty Mutual Legends of Golf – Legendary Division (with Gene Littler)
- 2001 Liberty Mutual Legends of Golf – Demaret Division (with Gene Littler)
- 2004 Liberty Mutual Legends of Golf – Demaret Division (with Gene Littler)

== Major championships ==
=== Wins (1) ===
Year	Championship	54 holes	Winning score	Margin	Runner-up
1967	PGA Championship	4 shot deficit	−7 (71-72-70-68=281)	Playoff^{1}	(United States) Don Massengale

^{1}Defeated Massengale in an 18-hole playoff, 69 to 71.

=== Results timeline ===
Tournament	1952	1953	1954	1955	1956	1957	1958	1959
Masters Tournament								36
U.S. Open	CUT				CUT		T7	T19
PGA Championship								T49

Tournament	1960	1961	1962	1963	1964	1965	1966	1967	1968	1969
Masters Tournament	T20	T4	T20	T9	T18	CUT	T6	T26	T14	T5
U.S. Open		CUT	CUT	11	T11	CUT	T17	3	T24	WD
PGA Championship	5	2	T27	T40	CUT		T12	1	T51	T15

Tournament	1970	1971	1972	1973	1974	1975	1976	1977	1978	1979
Masters Tournament	T12	T4	CUT	T10			T33	T8	T11	CUT
U.S. Open		T27	T11			T29	T14			
PGA Championship	T12	CUT	CUT			T10	T2	T6	T19	T7

Tournament	1980	1981	1982
Masters Tournament	CUT		
U.S. Open			
PGA Championship	CUT	T19	CUT

Note: January never played in The Open Championship.

Win
Top 10
Did not play

CUT = missed the halfway cut (3rd round cut in 1964 PGA Championship)
WD = withdrew
"T" indicates a tie for a place

=== Summary ===
Tournament	Wins	2nd	3rd	Top-5	Top-10	Top-25	Events	Cuts made
Masters Tournament	0	0	0	3	7	13	20	16
U.S. Open	0	0	1	1	2	9	17	11
The Open Championship	0	0	0	0	0	0	0	0
PGA Championship	1	2	0	4	7	12	21	16
Totals	1	2	1	8	16	34	58	43

- Most consecutive cuts made – 10 (twice)
- Longest streak of top-10s – 3 (1976 PGA – 1977 PGA)

== Champions Tour major championships ==
=== Wins (1) ===
Year	Championship	Winning score	Margin	Runner-up
1982	Senior PGA Championship	E (74-75-69-70=288)	1 stroke	(United States) Julius Boros

== U.S. national team appearances ==
Professional

- Ryder Cup: 1965 (winners), 1977 (winners)

== See also ==
- List of golfers with most PGA Tour Champions wins
- List of men's major championships winning golfers
