= Roy Clark Senior Challenge =

The Roy Clark Senior Challenge was a golf tournament on the Champions Tour played only in 1984. It was played in Tulsa, Oklahoma at the Tulsa Country Club.

The purse for the tournament was US$200,000, with $30,000 going to the winner, Miller Barber.
