= 1980 Senior PGA Tour =

Golf tour season

1980 Senior PGA Tour season
- Duration: June 19, 1980 – December 7, 1980
- Number of official events: 4
- Money list: (United States) Don January

The 1980 Senior PGA Tour was the inaugural season of the Senior PGA Tour, the main professional golf tour in the United States for men aged 50 and over.

== Schedule ==
The following table lists official events during the 1980 season.

Date	Tournament	Location	Purse (US$)	Winner (Note: The number in parentheses after each winner's name is the number of Senior PGA Tour events they had won up to and including that tournament. This information is only shown for Senior PGA Tour members.)	Notes
Jun 22	Atlantic City Senior International	New Jersey	125,000	(United States) Don January (1)	New tournament
Jun 29	U.S. Senior Open	New York	100,000	(Argentina) Roberto De Vicenzo (1)	Senior major championship (Note: Also a new tournament.)
Nov 16	Suntree Classic	Florida	125,000	(United States) Charlie Sifford (1)	New tournament
Dec 7	PGA Seniors' Championship	Florida	125,000	(United States) Arnold Palmer (1)	Senior major championship

== Money list ==
The money list was based on prize money won during the season, calculated in U.S. dollars.

Position	Player	Prize money ($)
1	(United States) Don January	44,100
2	(United States) Charlie Sifford	34,929
3	(United States) Art Wall Jr.	20,829
T4	(Argentina) Roberto De Vicenzo	20,000
T4	(United States) Arnold Palmer	20,000

== Awards ==
Award	Winner	Ref.
Scoring leader (Byron Nelson Award)	(United States) Don January	
