= Mike Fetchick =

American professional golfer (1922–2012

Personal information
- Full name: Michael Fetchick
- Nationality: United States
- Born: October 13, 1922 Yonkers, New York, U.S.
- Died: March 8, 2012 (aged 89)
- Height: 6 ft 1 in (1.85 m)
- Weight: 200 lb (91 kg; 14 st)

Career
- Sport: Golf
- Turned professional: 1950
- Former tours: PGA Tour; Champions Tour
- Professional wins: 10

Number of wins by tour
- PGA Tour: 3
- PGA Tour Champions: 1
- Other: 4 (regular); 2 (senior)

Best results in major championships
- Masters Tournament: T16: 1957
- PGA Championship: T23: 1964
- U.S. Open: T13: 1957
- The Open Championship: DNP

Michael Fetchick (October 13, 1922 – March 8, 2012) was an American professional golfer who played on the PGA Tour and the Senior PGA Tour.

== Career ==
Fetchick was born in Yonkers, New York. He turned pro in 1950 and joined the PGA Tour in 1952. He won the 1956 Western Open at The Presidio in San Francisco, California in an 18-hole playoff over Doug Ford, Jay Hebert and Don January. In the 1950s, the Western Open was considered by some to be one of major championships in men's professional golf along with The Masters, U.S. Open and the PGA Championship. It's generally conceded by golf historians that Fetchick's victory over the sports top stars resulted in a demotion for the Western Open below the other majors. His best finish in an event considered to be one of four modern major championships was T13 at the 1957 U.S. Open.

Prior to Scott Hoch winning in 2019 at the age of 63 years and 5 months, Fetchick held the Champions Tour record for the oldest winner (1985 Hilton Head Seniors International on his 63rd birthday), and the longest time between his last PGA Tour victory and his first Champions Tour victory: 28 years, 9 months and 27 days. Fetchick also finished T-2 (playoff loss) at the 1990 NYNEX Commemorative at age 67.

Fetchick died in 2012.

== Professional wins (10) ==
=== PGA Tour wins (3) ===
No.	Date	Tournament	Winning score	Margin of victory	Runner(s)-up
1	Mar 18, 1956	St. Petersburg Open	−13 (69-68-69-69=275)	Playoff	(United States) Lionel Hebert
2	Oct 15, 1956	Western Open	−4 (71-69-74-70=284)	Playoff	(United States) Doug Ford, (United States) Jay Hebert, (United States) Don January
3	Dec 16, 1956	Mayfair Inn Open	−17 (65-63-67-68=263)	2 strokes	(United States) Frank Stranahan

=== Other wins (4) ===
- 1955 Imperial Valley Open
- 1963 Long Island PGA Championship
- 1964 Long Island PGA Championship
- 1982 Long Island PGA Championship

=== Senior PGA Tour wins (1) ===
No.	Date	Tournament	Winning score	Margin of victory	Runners-up
1	Oct 13, 1985	Hilton Head Seniors International	−6 (69-69-72=210)	2 strokes	(United States) Al Chandler, (United States) Gene Littler, (United States) Orville Moody

Senior PGA Tour playoff record (0–1)

No.	Year	Tournament	Opponents	Result
1	1990	NYNEX Commemorative	(United States) Jimmy Powell, (United States) Chi-Chi Rodríguez, (United States) Lee Trevino	Trevino won with birdie on fifth extra hole Powell and Rodríguez eliminated by birdie on first hole

=== Other senior wins (2) ===
- 1990 Liberty Mutual Legends of Golf - Legendary Division (with Bob Toski)
- 1992 Liberty Mutual Legends of Golf - Legendary Division (with Bob Toski)
