= Walter Hall (golfer) =

American golfer

Personal information
- Full name: Walter Houston Hall
- Nationality: United States
- Born: June 12, 1947 (age 79) Winston-Salem, North Carolina, U.S.
- Height: 6 ft 1 in (1.85 m)
- Weight: 200 lb (91 kg; 14 st)

Career
- Sport: Golf
- College: University of Maryland
- Turned professional: 1971, (Note: Amateur status reinstated in September 1972.) 1973, (Note: Amateur status reinstated in May 1980.) 1994
- Former tours: Asia Golf Circuit; NGA Hooters Tour; Champions Tour; European Seniors Tour
- Professional wins: 4

Number of wins by tour
- PGA Tour Champions: 1
- European Senior Tour: 1
- Other: 2

Walter Houston Hall (born June 12, 1947) is an American professional golfer.

== Early life ==
Hall was born in Winston-Salem, North Carolina. He played collegiately at the University of Maryland, College Park.

== Career ==
Hall turned professional in 1971, his amateur status having been forfeited when he entered the qualifying tournament for the PGA Tour. After failing to qualify for the tour, regained his amateur status in September 1972. He turned professional again in July 1973, and played on several mini-tours after missing out on the PGA Tour for a second time. After being professionally inactive for five years, in May 1980, he regained his amateur status once more. He turned professional for a third time in his late 40s, in preparation for the over-50s senior tours, and played on the Asia Golf Circuit in 1994 and 1995 and mini-tours in the United States, including the NGA Hooters Tour. His first professional win came at the Mid Pines Open on the Coastal Carolina Tour (later the Hurricane Tour) in 1993. In 1996, he won the season ending Naturally Fresh Cup on the Hooters Tour.

Hall joined the Senior PGA Tour in 1997 and has won once, the 2001 AT&T Canada Senior Open Championship. He also won the PGA Seniors Championship on the European Seniors Tour in 1997.

== Amateur wins ==
- Forsyth Invitational (1969, 1970, 1981, 1982. 1984, 1991)
- CGA Mid-Amateur (1985)

== Professional wins (4) ==
=== NAG Hooters Tour wins (1) ===
No.	Date	Tournament	Winning score	Margin of victory	Runners-up
1	Sep 29, 1996	Naturally Fresh Cup	−10 (66-72-70-70=278)	Playoff	(United States) Steve Ford, (United States) Kyle Flinton, (United States) Garrett Willis

=== Other wins (1) ===
- 1993 Mid Pines Open (Coastal Carolina Tour)

=== Senior PGA Tour wins (1) ===
No.	Date	Tournament	Winning score	Margin of victory	Runner-up
1	Aug 26, 2001	AT&T Canada Senior Open Championship	−15 (68-66-65-70=269)	Playoff	(United States) Ed Dougherty

Senior PGA Tour playoff record (1–1)

No.	Year	Tournament	Opponent(s)	Result
1	2000	ACE Group Classic	(Spain) José María Cañizares, (United States) Lanny Wadkins, (United States) Tom Watson	Wadkins won with par on third extra hole Hall and Watson eliminated by par on first hole
2	2001	AT&T Canada Senior Open Championship	(United States) Ed Dougherty	Won with par on first extra hole

=== European Seniors Tour wins (1) ===
No.	Date	Tournament	Winning score	Margin of victory	Runner-up
1	Aug 25, 1997	The Belfry PGA Seniors Championship	−11 (69-69-69-70=277)	3 strokes	(England) Tommy Horton
