= Lee Elder =

American professional golfer (1934–2021)

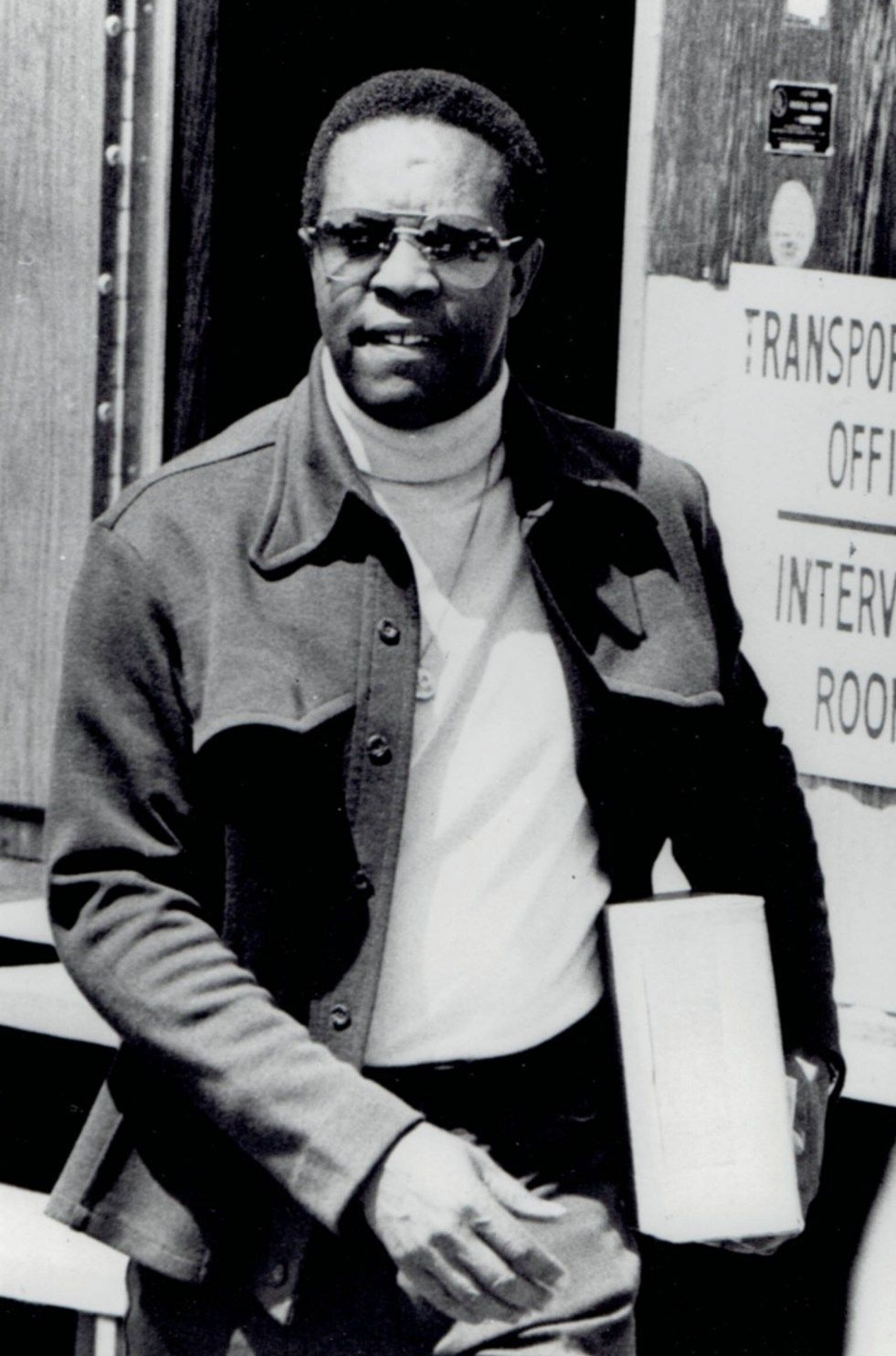
- Elder in 1975

Personal information
- Full name: Robert Lee Elder
- Nationality: United States
- Born: July 14, 1934 Dallas, Texas, U.S.
- Died: November 28, 2021 (aged 87) Escondido, California, U.S.
- Height: 5 ft 8 in (1.73 m)
- Weight: 175 lb (79 kg; 12.5 st)

Career
- Sport: Golf
- Turned professional: 1959
- Former tours: PGA Tour; Champions Tour
- Professional wins: 16

Number of wins by tour
- PGA Tour: 4
- PGA Tour Champions: 8
- Other: 4

Best results in major championships
- Masters Tournament: T17: 1979
- PGA Championship: T11: 1974
- U.S. Open: T11: 1979
- The Open Championship: T36: 1979

Achievements and awards
- Bob Jones Award: 2019

Robert Lee Elder (July 14, 1934 – November 28, 2021) was an American professional golfer. In 1975, he became the first black golfer to play in the Masters Tournament. Elder was invited to the tournament after he won the 1974 Monsanto Open.

== Early life ==
In 1934, Elder was born in Dallas, Texas. He is the son of Charles and Almeta Elder. Elder was one of ten children. He was nine years old when his father was killed in Germany during World War II and his mother died three months later.

At the age of 12, Elder found himself moving from one ghetto to another before being sent to Los Angeles, California to live with his aunt. Elder frequently cut classes to work as a caddie and after two years at Manual Arts High School he dropped out.

== Amateur career ==
Elder did not play a full round of 18 holes until he was sixteen years old. He took jobs in pro shops and locker rooms; in addition, he caddied where he developed his game by watching his clients, and playing when he had the opportunity. Elder's game developed sufficiently for him to start hustling. His career took a big step after playing a match with heavyweight boxer Joe Louis, which led to Louis’s golf instructor, Ted Rhodes, taking Elder under his wing for three years. Under the tutelage of Rhodes, Elder was able to polish his game and he began playing in tournaments.

== Professional career ==
In 1959, Elder turned professional. That year he was also was drafted into the U.S. Army and was sent to Fort Lewis, Washington. While at Fort Lewis, Elder had the good fortune to be under the command of Colonel John Gleaster who was an avid golfer. Gleaster put Elder in a Special Services unit, which allowed him the opportunity to play golf on a steady basis.

Elder was discharged from the army in 1961, and joined the United Golf Association Tour (UGA) for black players (at the time they were excluded from the Professional Golfers' Association of America (PGA) which was only "for members of the Caucasian race"). He had a dominant stretch in which he won 18 of 22 consecutive tournaments, but this tour did not have large prizes, often in the range of $500.

The PGA lifted its color barrier in 1961, meaning non white players could become members. In 1967 Elder raised enough money to attend qualifying school for the PGA Tour. At 1967 PGA Tour Qualifying School, Elder finished 9th out of a class of 122 and gained his tour card for 1968. That year, he placed 40th on the money list, bringing in approximately $38,000. The highlight of Elder's rookie season was a memorable playoff loss to Jack Nicklaus at the American Golf Classic. Elder lost to Nicklaus on the fifth hole of sudden death.

In 1971, Elder accepted a personal invitation from Gary Player to participate in the South African PGA Championship in Johannesburg, South Africa. The event marked the first integrated tournament in the country’s history. The country had apartheid policies in effect at the time but he agreed to participate after the South African government agreed not to subject him or spectators to the usual segregation requirements. Elder also played in a number of other tournaments on the Southern African Tour plus he won the 1971 Nigerian Open.

In 1974, Elder earned his first win on the PGA Tour at the Monsanto Open which gained him entry to the Masters Tournament in Augusta, Georgia the following April. This marked the first time Augusta National Golf Club invited a specifically-black American golfer to compete in the Masters Tournament. Elder shot a 74 on day one and a 78 on day two of the 1975 Masters, missing the cut, but the impact of his presence in the field was clear. Elder went on to play in the Masters five more times from 1977 to 1981 and compiled two 'Top-20' finishes among his made cuts at Augusta. In 1979, Elder made the cut in all 4 majors between the ages of 44 and 45. The 1979 tournament was the only time Elder competed in the British Open.

In 1979, he became the first black American golfer to qualify for play in the Ryder Cup.

In 1984, at the age of 50, Elder joined the Senior PGA Tour. He won a total of eight tournaments on the senior tour between 1984 and 1988.

In April 2021, Elder took part in the traditional ceremonial start to the Masters.

== Personal life ==
Elder met his first wife, Rose Harper, at a golf tournament in Washington, D.C. In 1966, they married and later divorced.

Elder and his then wife, Harper, set up the Lee Elder Scholarship Fund in 1974. This fund was developed to offer monetary aid to low-income young men and women seeking money for college.

Elder died on November 28, 2021, in Escondido, California at the age of 87.

== Professional wins (16) ==
=== PGA Tour wins (4) ===
| No. | Date | Tournament | Winning score | Margin of victory | Runner-up |
|---|---|---|---|---|---|
| 1 | Apr 21, 1974 | Monsanto Open | −10 (67-69-71-67=274) | Playoff | (England) Peter Oosterhuis |
| 2 | May 2, 1976 | Houston Open | −10 (70-72-67-69=278) | 1 stroke | (United States) Forrest Fezler |
| 3 | Jul 9, 1978 | Greater Milwaukee Open | −13 (66-70-70-69=275) | Playoff | (United States) Lee Trevino |
| 4 | Aug 20, 1978 | American Express Westchester Classic | −10 (71-68-68-67=274) | 1 stroke | (United States) Mark Hayes |

PGA Tour playoff record (2–2)

| No. | Year | Tournament | Opponent(s) | Result |
|---|---|---|---|---|
| 1 | 1968 | American Golf Classic | (United States) Frank Beard, (United States) Jack Nicklaus | Nicklaus won with birdie on fifth extra hole Beard eliminated by birdie on first hole |
| 2 | 1972 | Greater Hartford Open | (United States) Lee Trevino | Lost to birdie on first extra hole |
| 3 | 1974 | Monsanto Open | (England) Peter Oosterhuis | Won with birdie on fourth extra hole |
| 4 | 1978 | Greater Milwaukee Open | (United States) Lee Trevino | Won with par on eighth extra hole |

=== Other wins (2) ===
- 1971 Nigerian Open
- 1984 Jamaica Open

=== Senior PGA Tour wins (8) ===
| No. | Date | Tournament | Winning score | Margin of victory | Runner(s)-up |
|---|---|---|---|---|---|
| 1 | Aug 28, 1984 | Suntree Senior Classic | −16 (64-66-70=200) | 6 strokes | (United States) Miller Barber, (United States) Gay Brewer |
| 2 | Sep 19, 1984 | Hilton Head Seniors International | −13 (68-69-66=203) | 3 strokes | (Australia) Peter Thomson |
| 3 | Jun 2, 1985 | Denver Post Champions of Golf | −3 (68-69-76=213) | 1 stroke | (Australia) Peter Thomson |
| 4 | Jul 28, 1985 | Merrill Lynch/Golf Digest Commemorative Pro-Am | −11 (61-72=133)* | Playoff | (Australia) Peter Thomson |
| 5 | Aug 4, 1985 | Digital Seniors Classic | −8 (73-67-68=208) | Playoff | (United States) Jerry Barber, (United States) Don January |
| 6 | Sep 1, 1985 | Citizens Union Senior Golf Classic | −7 (67-68=135)* | Playoff | (United States) Orville Moody, (United States) Dan Sikes, (United States) Walt Zembriski |
| 7 | Aug 3, 1986 | Merrill Lynch/Golf Digest Commemorative (2) | −11 (67-64-68=199) | 2 strokes | (United States) Chi-Chi Rodríguez |
| 8 | Nov 20, 1988 | Gus Machado Senior Classic | −11 (67-70-65=202) | 5 strokes | (United States) Al Geiberger |

*Note: Tournament shortened to 36 holes due to rain.

Senior PGA Tour playoff record (3–0)

| No. | Year | Tournament | Opponent(s) | Result |
|---|---|---|---|---|
| 1 | 1985 | Merrill Lynch/Golf Digest Commemorative Pro-Am | (Australia) Peter Thomson | Won with eagle on first extra hole |
| 2 | 1985 | Digital Seniors Classic | (United States) Jerry Barber, (United States) Don January | Elder won with birdie on first extra hole |
| 3 | 1985 | Citizens Union Senior Golf Classic | (United States) Orville Moody, (United States) Dan Sikes, (United States) Walt Zembriski | Elder won with birdie on third extra hole Moody eliminated by birdie on second hole |

=== Japan Senior wins (2) ===
- 1984 Coca-Cola Grandslam Championship
- 1986 Coca-Cola Grandslam Championship

== Results in major championships ==
| Tournament | 1966 | 1967 | 1968 | 1969 |
|---|---|---|---|---|
| Masters Tournament | | | | |
| U.S. Open | T57 | CUT | CUT | 67 |
| The Open Championship | | | | |
| PGA Championship | | | | CUT |

| Tournament | 1970 | 1971 | 1972 | 1973 | 1974 | 1975 | 1976 | 1977 | 1978 | 1979 |
|---|---|---|---|---|---|---|---|---|---|---|
| Masters Tournament | | | | | | CUT | | T19 | T42 | T17 |
| U.S. Open | CUT | | T29 | T45 | CUT | | T35 | CUT | T30 | T11 |
| The Open Championship | | | | | | | | | | T36 |
| PGA Championship | CUT | | T24 | T24 | T11 | | T15 | CUT | T42 | T35 |

| Tournament | 1980 | 1981 | 1982 | 1983 | 1984 |
|---|---|---|---|---|---|
| Masters Tournament | CUT | CUT | | | |
| U.S. Open | CUT | T33 | | | |
| The Open Championship | | | | | |
| PGA Championship | T26 | T49 | | T80 | CUT |

Did not play

CUT = missed the halfway cut
"T" indicates a tie for a place

=== Summary ===
| Tournament | Wins | 2nd | 3rd | Top-5 | Top-10 | Top-25 | Events | Cuts made |
|---|---|---|---|---|---|---|---|---|
| Masters Tournament | 0 | 0 | 0 | 0 | 0 | 2 | 6 | 3 |
| U.S. Open | 0 | 0 | 0 | 0 | 0 | 1 | 14 | 8 |
| The Open Championship | 0 | 0 | 0 | 0 | 0 | 0 | 1 | 1 |
| PGA Championship | 0 | 0 | 0 | 0 | 0 | 4 | 13 | 9 |
| Totals | 0 | 0 | 0 | 0 | 0 | 7 | 34 | 21 |

- Most consecutive cuts made – 7 (1978 Masters – 1979 PGA)
- Longest streak of top-10s – 0

== U.S. national team appearances ==
Professional

- Ryder Cup: 1979 (winners)

== See also ==
- 1967 PGA Tour Qualifying School graduates
