= AT&T Canada Senior Open Championship =

The AT&T Canada Senior Open Championship was a professional golf tournament in Canada on the Senior PGA Tour, now the PGA Tour Champions. Held from 1981 to 1985 and 1996 to 2002, it was played at a different course each year.

The purse for the 2002 edition was US$1.6 million, with a winner's share of $240,000; it was founded in 1981 as the Peter Jackson Champions.

== Winners ==
- 2002 Tom Jenkins (2)
- 2001 Walter Hall
- 2001 Tom Jenkins
- 1999 Jim Ahern
- 1998 Brian Barnes

du Maurier Champions

- 1997 Jack Kiefer
- 1996 Charles Coody
- 1986–1995 No tournament
- 1985 Peter Thomson
- 1984 Don January (2)

Peter Jackson Champions

- 1983 Don January
- 1982 Bob Goalby
- 1981 Miller Barber
