= Valencia Open Invitational =

Golf tournament

Tournament information
- Location: Valencia, Venezuela
- Established: 1959
- Course(s): Carabobo Country Club
- Par: 72
- Tour(s): Caribbean Tour
- Format: Stroke play
- Final year: 1959

Final champion
- Don January

The Valencia Open Invitational was a golf tournament held in 1959 and was part of the PGA-sponsored Caribbean Tour, which began the previous year.

It was held at Carabobo Country Club near Valencia, Venezuela, from 5 to 8 February with prize money of US$10,000. Don January led from the start after a first round of 64. Further rounds of 71-71-67 gave him victory by 11 strokes from Ernie Vossler, taking the first prize of US$1,500.

== Winners ==
Year	Player	Country	Score	To par	Margin of victory	Runner-up	Ref
1959	Don January	United States	273	−15	11 strokes	(United States) Ernie Vossler	
