= Bob Goalby =

American professional golfer (1929–2022)

Personal information
- Full name: Robert George Goalby
- Nationality: United States
- Born: March 14, 1929 Belleville, Illinois, U.S.
- Died: January 19, 2022 (aged 92) Belleville, Illinois, U.S.
- Height: 6 ft 0 in (1.83 m)
- Weight: 195 lb (88 kg; 13.9 st)

Career
- Sport: Golf
- College: University of Illinois
- Turned professional: 1957
- Former tours: PGA Tour; Champions Tour
- Professional wins: 14

Number of wins by tour
- PGA Tour: 11
- PGA Tour Champions: 2
- Other: 1

Best results in major championships (wins: 1)
- Masters Tournament: Won: 1968
- PGA Championship: 2nd: 1962
- U.S. Open: T2: 1961
- The Open Championship: DNP

Robert George Goalby (March 14, 1929 – January 19, 2022) was an American professional golfer. He won 11 PGA Tour events including the 1968 Masters.

== Early life ==
In 1929, Goalby was born in Belleville, Illinois. There he was raised, and lived for much of his life. He was the son of a coal miner, the family had little money and he would sneak over the fence of nearby St Clair Country Club to indulge his love for golf. He also worked as a caddie at the course. He excelled in athletics during his time at Belleville Township High School earning 11 varsity letters. Notably, he was a catcher and pitcher on the Illinois High School Association(IHSA) championship Baseball Team his junior year and an All-State quarterback during his senior year of High School.

== Amateur career ==
Goalby attended the University of Illinois on a football scholarship only to lose his eligibility due to playing several baseball games for Southern Illinois University, and quit college altogether. He served in the United States military during the Korean War.

== Professional career ==
In 1957, Goalby turned professional. In 1958, he won his first tour event. Goalby earned the PGA Tour Rookie of the Year Award in that season. He won and contended steadily until 1971 when he was 42 years old.

At the 1968 Masters Tournament, he tied Roberto De Vicenzo at the end of 72 holes of regulation play and would have had to face an 18-hole playoff the next day had there not been a mistake on DeVicenzo's scorecard. In the final round, DeVicenzo's playing partner Tommy Aaron marked a par-4 on the 17th hole when DeVicenzo had in fact made a birdie 3. DeVicenzo failed to catch the mistake and signed the scorecard. The rules of golf state that the higher written score signed by a golfer on his card must stand and as such, the error gave Goalby the championship. Goalby, playing in the group behind DeVicenzo, was not personally at fault for anything in the incident. The incident received extraordinary media attention at the time and has remained high in public consciousness since. It was recounted in great detail in the 2005 book The Lost Masters: Grace and Disgrace in '68 by Curt Sampson. The personal relationship between Goalby and DeVicenzo was unaffected by the difficult situation, and the two players formed a partnership years later, for a team event on the Champions Tour.

Goalby played on the Ryder Cup team in 1963 and retired from the PGA Tour after winning 11 tournaments. He joined the Senior PGA Tour in 1979, winning twice, and contributed key ideas to the formation and structure of that new Tour, before retiring to a home in his native Belleville, where he has designed several nearby golf courses. He also served as a golf commentator for NBC television for 14 years.

== Awards and honors ==
- In 1982, a charity golf tournament, the Bob Goalby Golf Open, was inaugurated. Goalby lent his name to the tournament to benefit Maur Hill - Mount Academy, a Catholic, international, college preparatory school in Atchison, Kansas.
- In 1991, Goalby was inducted into the Illinois Golf Hall of Fame.
- In 2009, Goalby was inducted of the St. Louis Sports Hall Of Fame.
- In 2017, the football stadium at Belleville High School-West was dedicated to him.
- Goalby has earned a plaque on the Belleville Walk of Fame.

== Personal life ==
Goalby had three sons: Kye, Kel and Kevin, the former of whom is a golf course architect. Goalby's nephew Jay Haas is a 9-time PGA Tour winner, and another nephew, Jerry Haas, coaches the Wake Forest University golf team. His great-nephew, Bill Haas, plays on the PGA Tour, and won the Tour Championship tournament and FedEx Cup in 2011.

As of 2018, Goalby resided in Palm Desert, California. Goalby died in Belleville on January 19, 2022, at the age of 92.

== Professional wins (14) ==
=== PGA Tour wins (11) ===
Legend
Major championships (1)
Other PGA Tour (10)

No.	Date	Tournament	Winning score	Margin of victory	Runner(s)-up
1	Apr 13, 1958	Greater Greensboro Open	−9 (71-69-69-66=275)	2 strokes	(United States) Dow Finsterwald, (United States) Don January, (United States) Tony Lema, (United States) Sam Snead, (United States) Art Wall Jr.
2	Dec 11, 1960	Coral Gables Open Invitational	−12 (67-67-71-67=272)	1 stroke	(United States) Dow Finsterwald
3	Jan 9, 1961	Los Angeles Open	−9 (67-70-71-67=275)	3 strokes	(Scotland) Eric Brown, (United States) Art Wall Jr.
4	Mar 19, 1961	St. Petersburg Open Invitational	−23 (67-62-67-65=261)	3 strokes	(United States) Ted Kroll
5	Aug 5, 1962	Insurance City Open Invitational	−13 (69-69-66-67=271)	Playoff	(United States) Art Wall Jr.
6	Sep 9, 1962	Denver Open Invitational	−3 (72-69-67-69=277)	1 stroke	(United States) George Bayer, (United States) Bob Duden, (United States) Jack Fleck, (United States) Bill Johnston, (United States) Billy Maxwell, (United States) Art Wall Jr.
7	Jan 15, 1967	San Diego Open Invitational	−15 (68-64-68-69=269)	1 stroke	(United States) Gay Brewer
8	Apr 14, 1968	Masters Tournament	−11 (70-70-71-66=277)	1 stroke	(Argentina) Roberto De Vicenzo
9	Sep 28, 1969	Robinson Open Golf Classic	−15 (62-71-73-67=273)	Playoff	(United States) Jim Wiechers
10	Nov 29, 1970	Heritage Golf Classic	−4 (74-70-70-66=280)	4 strokes	(United States) Lanny Wadkins
11	Dec 12, 1971	Bahamas National Open	−9 (69-70-66-70=275)	1 stroke	(United States) George Archer

PGA Tour playoff record (2–1)

No.	Year	Tournament	Opponent	Result
1	1962	Insurance City Open Invitational	(United States) Art Wall Jr.	Won with birdie on seventh extra hole
2	1965	Hawaiian Open	(United States) Gay Brewer	Lost to birdie on first extra hole
3	1969	Robinson Open Golf Classic	(United States) Jim Wiechers	Won with birdie on first extra hole

=== Senior PGA Tour wins (2) ===
No.	Date	Tournament	Winning score	Margin of victory	Runner-up
1	Jun 28, 1981	Marlboro Classic	−2 (70-68-70=208)	2 strokes	(United States) Art Wall Jr.
2	Jun 27, 1982	Peter Jackson Champions	−15 (68-68-64-73=273)	1 stroke	(United States) Gene Littler

Senior PGA Tour playoff record (0–1)

No.	Year	Tournament	Opponents	Result
1	1985	Bank One Senior Golf Classic	(United States) Miller Barber, (United States) Gene Littler	Littler won with par on third extra hole Goalby eliminated by par on first hole

=== Other senior wins (1) ===
- 1983 Shootout at Jeremy Ranch (with Mike Reid)

== Major championships ==
=== Wins (1) ===
Year	Championship	54 holes	Winning score	Margin	Runner-up
1968	Masters Tournament	1 shot deficit	−11 (70-70-71-66=277)	1 stroke	(Argentina) Roberto De Vicenzo

=== Results timeline ===
Tournament	1957	1958	1959
Masters Tournament			
U.S. Open	CUT		T38
PGA Championship			T5

Tournament	1960	1961	1962	1963	1964	1965	1966	1967	1968	1969
Masters Tournament	CUT	36	T25	CUT	T37	T39	T59	CUT	1	T40
U.S. Open	T19	T2	T14	CUT		CUT	T22	T6	T39	
PGA Championship	T32	T15	2	T17	CUT	T68	T49	T7	T8	CUT

Tournament	1970	1971	1972	1973	1974	1975	1976	1977	1978	1979
Masters Tournament	CUT	T36	T17	T6	T22	CUT	CUT	CUT	52	CUT
U.S. Open	T36	T19		T58	CUT	T63				
PGA Championship	CUT	T46	T62	T18						

Tournament	1980	1981	1982	1983	1984	1985	1986
Masters Tournament	CUT	CUT	46	CUT	CUT	CUT	CUT
U.S. Open							
PGA Championship							

Note: Goalby never played in The Open Championship.

Win
Top 10
Did not play

CUT = missed the halfway cut
"T" indicates a tie for a place.

=== Summary ===
Tournament	Wins	2nd	3rd	Top-5	Top-10	Top-25	Events	Cuts made
Masters Tournament	1	0	0	1	2	5	27	13
U.S. Open	0	1	0	1	2	6	15	11
The Open Championship	0	0	0	0	0	0	0	0
PGA Championship	0	1	0	2	4	7	15	12
Totals	1	2	0	4	8	18	57	36

- Most consecutive cuts made – 9 (1971 PGA – 1974 Masters)
- Longest streak of top-10s – 3 (1967 U.S. Open – 1968 Masters)

== U.S. national team appearances ==
Professional

- Ryder Cup: 1963 (winners)
