= Eureka Federal Savings Classic =

The Eureka Federal Savings Classic was a golf tournament on the Champions Tour played only in 1981. It was played in San Francisco, California at the Harding Park Golf Club. The purse for the tournament was US$150,000, with $25,000 going to the winner, Don January.
