= Atlantic City Senior International =

The Atlantic City Senior International was a golf tournament on the Senior PGA Tour played only in 1980. It was played in Northfield, New Jersey at the Atlantic City Country Club. It was the first event on the Senior PGA Tour.

The purse for the tournament was US$125,000, with $20,000 going to the winner, Don January.
