= Seiko-Tucson Senior Match Play Championship =

Golf tournament in Arizona (1984–1986)

The Seiko-Tucson Match Play Championship was a golf tournament on the Champions Tour from 1984 to 1986. It was played in Tucson, Arizona at the Randolph Park Municipal Golf Club. It was played using a match play format instead of the more common stroke play. A PGA Tour event (Seiko-Tucson Match Play Championship) was played concurrently at the same location.

The purse for the 1986 tournament was US$300,000, with $75,000 going to the winner. The tournament was founded in 1984 as the Seiko-Tucson Senior Match Play Championship.

== Winners ==
- 1986 Jim Thorpe
- 1985 Jim Thorpe
- 1984 Gene Littler
