= Daytona Beach Seniors Golf Classic =

The Daytona Beach Seniors Golf Classic was a golf tournament on the Champions Tour from 1983 to 1984. It was played in Daytona Beach, Florida at the Pelican Bay Golf and Country Club, now known as the Club at Pelican Bay.

The purse for the 1984 tournament was US$150,000, with $22,500 going to the winner. The tournament was founded in 1983 as the Greater Daytona Senior Classic.

== Winners ==
Daytona Beach Seniors Golf Classic

- 1984 Orville Moody

Greater Daytona Senior Classic

- 1983 Gene Littler
