= Michelob Senior Classic =

Golf tournament

The Michelob Senior Classic was a golf tournament on the Champions Tour from 1981 to 1982. It was played in Tampa, Florida at the Carrollwood Village Country Club.

The purse for the 1982 tournament was US$125,000, with $20,000 going to the winner. The tournament was founded in 1981 as the Michelob-Egypt Temple Senior Classic.

== Winners ==
Michelob Senior Classic

- 1982 Don January

Michelob-Egypt Temple Senior Classic

- 1981 Don January
