= Miller Barber =

American professional golfer (1931–2013)

Personal information
- Full name: Miller Westford Barber Jr.
- Nickname: Mr. X
- Nationality: United States
- Born: March 31, 1931 Shreveport, Louisiana, U.S.
- Died: June 11, 2013 (aged 82) Scottsdale, Arizona, U.S.
- Height: 5 ft 11 in (1.80 m)
- Weight: 200 lb (91 kg; 14 st)

Career
- Sport: Golf
- College: University of Arkansas
- Turned professional: 1958
- Former tours: PGA Tour; Senior PGA Tour
- Professional wins: 43

Number of wins by tour
- PGA Tour: 11
- PGA Tour Champions: 24 (6th all-time)
- Other: 1 (regular); 7 (senior)

Best results in major championships
- Masters Tournament: 7th: 1969
- PGA Championship: T4: 1971
- U.S. Open: 6th/T6: 1969, 1970
- The Open Championship: 10th: 1969

Achievements and awards
- Senior PGA Tour money list winner: 1981, 1982
- Senior PGA Tour Byron Nelson Award: 1981

Miller Westford Barber Jr. (March 31, 1931 – June 11, 2013) was an American professional golfer. He enjoyed significant success on the PGA Tour in the 1960s and 1970s, and a greater degree of success on the Senior PGA Tour in the 1980s.

== Early life ==
Barber was born in Shreveport, Louisiana. He spent much of his life in Texarkana, Texas. Barber graduated from the University of Arkansas in 1954.

== Professional career ==
In 1958, he turned professional. He won his first PGA Tour event in 1964. He earned 11 career tour wins, but did not win a major championship. The closest he came was in 1969 at the U.S. Open at Houston, where he held a three-shot lead over the field after three rounds, but shot 78 in the last round to finish three shots behind winner Orville Moody. Earlier in April 1969, Barber entered the final round of the Masters Tournament two shots out of the lead and was paired in Sunday's final group with Billy Casper but shot a final round 74 (which included a birdie from under a tree on the 72nd hole) and finished in 7th place. He played on the Ryder Cup team in 1969 and 1971, and in the latter year was ranked sixth on the McCormack rankings.

In 1973, Barber won the longest regulation tournament in PGA Tour history. The World Open Golf Championship played at Pinehurst Country Club was a 144-hole affair. Barber won by three strokes over Ben Crenshaw.

Barber became eligible to play on the Senior PGA Tour around a year after it was founded. He was one of the dominant players on the tour throughout the 1980s, competing on even terms with players who had had much more distinguished earlier careers, such as Lee Trevino and Arnold Palmer. His 24 wins on the tour included five senior majors, three of them U.S. Senior Opens.

Barber holds the record for combined PGA Tour and Champions Tour starts at 1,297.

Barber played with an unusual looped backswing/downswing, but squared up very consistently through impact. Several other PGA Tour players, including Jim Furyk, have had success with similar methods.

== Death ==
Barber died June 11, 2013, at the age of 82 of lymphoma in Scottsdale, Arizona. Barber was survived by his wife of 43 years, Karen, and sons Larry and Richard and stepsons Casey, Doug, Brad.

== Professional wins (43) ==
=== PGA Tour wins (11) ===
No.	Date	Tournament	Winning score	Margin of victory	Runner(s)-up
1	Nov 22, 1964	Cajun Classic Open Invitational	−7 (72-70-68-67=277)	5 strokes	(United States) Gay Brewer, (United States) Jack Nicklaus
2	May 28, 1967	Oklahoma City Open Invitational	−10 (70-72-68-68=278)	Playoff	(South Africa) Gary Player
3	Apr 28, 1968	Byron Nelson Golf Classic	−10 (67-68-65-70=270)	1 stroke	(United States) Kermit Zarley
4	Jan 20, 1969	Kaiser International Open Invitational	−9 (68-67=135) (Note: Shortened to 36 holes due to weather.)	1 stroke	(Australia) Bruce Devlin
5	Apr 20, 1970	Greater New Orleans Open Invitational	−10 (68-71-69-70=278)	Playoff	(New Zealand) Bob Charles, (United States) Howie Johnson
6	Jan 24, 1971	Phoenix Open Invitational	−23 (65-64-67-65=261)	2 strokes	(United States) Billy Casper, (United States) Dan Sikes
7	Jan 24, 1972	Dean Martin Tucson Open	−15 (68-73-67-65=273)	Playoff	(United States) George Archer
8	Nov 17, 1973	World Open Golf Championship	+2 (68-74-73-74- 67-73-72-69=570)	3 strokes	(United States) Ben Crenshaw
9	Sep 22, 1974	Ohio Kings Island Open	−7 (68-68-69-72=277)	3 strokes	(United States) George Johnson
10	Oct 2, 1977	Anheuser-Busch Golf Classic	−16 (71-66-70-65=272)	2 strokes	(United States) George Archer
11	Jan 15, 1978	Phoenix Open (2)	−12 (68-69-70-65=272)	1 stroke	(United States) Jerry Pate, (United States) Lee Trevino

PGA Tour playoff record (3–4)

No.	Year	Tournament	Opponent(s)	Result
1	1964	Pensacola Open Invitational	(United States) Arnold Palmer, (South Africa) Gary Player	Player won 18-hole playoff; Player: −1 (71), Palmer: E (72), Barber: +2 (74)
2	1967	Oklahoma City Open	(South Africa) Gary Player	Won with birdie on third extra hole
3	1970	Greater New Orleans Open Invitational	(New Zealand) Bob Charles, (United States) Howie Johnson	Won with birdie on second extra hole
4	1972	Dean Martin Tucson Open	(United States) George Archer	Won with birdie on third extra hole after 18-hole playoff; Archer: E (72), Barber: E (72)
5	1973	Greater New Orleans Open	(United States) Jack Nicklaus	Lost to birdie on second extra hole
6	1973	Liggett & Myers Open	(United States) Bert Greene	Lost to birdie on fifth extra hole
7	1976	San Antonio Texas Open	(United States) Butch Baird	Lost to birdie on first extra hole

=== Other wins (1) ===
- 1962 Metropolitan Open

=== Senior PGA Tour wins (24) ===
Legend
Senior PGA Tour major championships (5)
Other Senior PGA Tour (19)

No.	Date	Tournament	Winning score	Margin of victory	Runner(s)-up
1	Jun 14, 1981	Peter Jackson Champions	−12 (67-68-69=204)	Playoff	(United States) Gene Littler
2	Oct 18, 1981	Suntree Seniors Classic	−12 (68-71-65=204)	4 strokes	(United States) Bob Goalby
3	Dec 6, 1981	PGA Seniors' Championship	−7 (68-72-68-73=281)	2 strokes	(United States) Arnold Palmer
4	Jul 11, 1982	U.S. Senior Open	−2 (72-74-71-65=282)	4 strokes	(United States) Gene Littler, (United States) Dan Sikes
5	Oct 17, 1982	Suntree Classic (2)	−24 (66-66-66-66=264)	5 strokes	(United States) Don January
6	Oct 24, 1982	Hilton Head Seniors International	−6 (69-69=138)	Shared title with (United States) Dan Sikes	
7	Jun 12, 1983	Senior Tournament Players Championship	−10 (71-69-70-68=278)	1 stroke	(United States) Gene Littler
8	Jul 17, 1983	Merrill Lynch/Golf Digest Commemorative Pro-Am	−16 (65-66-69=200)	5 strokes	(United States) Gay Brewer
9	Oct 2, 1983	United Virginia Bank Seniors	−5 (68-71-72=211)	1 stroke	(Argentina) Roberto De Vicenzo, (United States) Rod Funseth, (United States) Don January
10	Oct 23, 1983	Hilton Head Seniors International (2)	−7 (72-69-71-69=281)	3 strokes	(United States) Gay Brewer, (United States) Jim Ferree, (United States) Gene Littler
11	Jun 17, 1984	Roy Clark Senior Challenge	−1 (71-73-68=212)	1 stroke	(United States) Don January, (Australia) Peter Thomson
12	Jul 1, 1984	U.S. Senior Open (2)	+6 (74-71-70-71=286)	2 strokes	(United States) Arnold Palmer
13	Jul 8, 1984	Greater Syracuse Senior's Pro Classic	−10 (69-70-67=206)	3 strokes	(United States) Rod Funseth
14	Jul 29, 1984	Denver Post Champions of Golf	−8 (68-70-70=208)	3 strokes	(United States) Gay Brewer
15	Feb 10, 1985	Sunrise Senior Classic	−5 (76-66-69=211)	1 stroke	(United States) Orville Moody
16	Jun 30, 1985	U.S. Senior Open (3)	−3 (71-72-71-71=285)	4 strokes	(Argentina) Roberto De Vicenzo
17	Sep 22, 1985	PaineWebber World Seniors Invitational	−11 (72-67-67-71=277)	2 strokes	(United States) Gay Brewer
18	Jan 11, 1986	MONY Senior Tournament of Champions	−6 (70-70-70-72=282)	5 strokes	(United States) Arnold Palmer
19	Aug 30, 1987	Showdown Classic	−6 (71-67-72=210)	1 stroke	(Australia) Bruce Crampton
20	Sep 27, 1987	Newport Cup	−14 (67-70-65=202)	2 strokes	(Australia) Bruce Crampton
21	Ju1 18, 1988	Showdown Classic (2)	−9 (70-67-70=207)	2 strokes	(United States) Orville Moody, (United States) Dick Rhyan, (United States) Ben Smith
22	Nov 13, 1988	Fairfield Barnett Classic	−19 (64-65-68=197)	5 strokes	(United States) Homero Blancas
23	Jan 8, 1989	MONY Senior Tournament of Champions (2)	−8 (73-67-68-72=280)	1 stroke	(United States) Dale Douglass
24	Mar 5, 1989	Vintage Chrysler Invitational	−7 (70-70-72-69=281)	1 stroke	(United States) Don Bies, (New Zealand) Bob Charles, (United States) Larry Mowry

Senior PGA Tour playoff record (1–1)

No.	Year	Tournament	Opponent(s)	Result
1	1981	Peter Jackson Champions	(United States) Gene Littler	Won with par on first extra hole
2	1986	Bank One Senior Golf Classic	(United States) Bob Goalby, (United States) Gene Littler	Littler won with par on third extra hole Goalby eliminated by par on first hole

=== Japan Senior wins (2) ===
- 1985 Coca-Cola Grandslam Championship
- 1991 Fuji Electric Grandslam Championship

=== Other senior wins (5) ===
- 1982 Vintage Invitational
- 1985 Shootout at Jeremy Ranch (with Ben Crenshaw)
- 1987 Mazda Champions (with Nancy Lopez)
- 2002 Liberty Mutual Legends of Golf - Demaret Division (with Jim Ferree)
- 2003 Liberty Mutual Legends of Golf - Demaret Division (with Jim Ferree)

== Results in major championships ==
Tournament	1961	1962	1963	1964	1965	1966	1967	1968	1969
Masters Tournament								T12	7
U.S. Open	CUT	22	CUT		T32	T26	T18	T24	T6
The Open Championship									10
PGA Championship					DQ	T34		T8	T5

Tournament	1970	1971	1972	1973	1974	1975	1976	1977	1978	1979
Masters Tournament	T21	CUT	CUT	T43	T15	T26			T24	T12
U.S. Open	6	59	T29	T25		T24	T38	CUT	T35	CUT
The Open Championship	CUT	T60			CUT					
PGA Championship	CUT	T4	T16	T24	T60		T51	T25		T28

Tournament	1980	1981	1982	1983	1984	1985	1986
Masters Tournament	CUT						
U.S. Open				CUT			CUT
The Open Championship							
PGA Championship	T65	CUT	T34				

Top 10
Did not play

DQ = disqualified
CUT = missed the half-way cut (3rd round cut in 1970 and 1974 Open Championships)
"T" indicates a tie for a place

=== Summary ===
Tournament	Wins	2nd	3rd	Top-5	Top-10	Top-25	Events	Cuts made
Masters Tournament	0	0	0	0	1	6	11	8
U.S. Open	0	0	0	0	2	7	19	13
The Open Championship	0	0	0	0	1	1	4	2
PGA Championship	0	0	0	2	3	6	15	12
Totals	0	0	0	2	7	20	49	35

- Most consecutive cuts made – 12 (1966 U.S. Open – 1970 U.S. Open)
- Longest streak of top-10s – 5 (1968 PGA – 1969 PGA)

== Champions Tour major championships ==
=== Wins (5) ===
Year	Championship	Winning score	Margin	Runner(s)-up
1981	PGA Seniors' Championship	−7 (68-72-68-73=281)	2 strokes	(United States) Arnold Palmer
1982	U.S. Senior Open	−2 (72-74-71-65=282)	4 strokes	(United States) Gene Littler, (United States) Dan Sikes
1983	Senior Tournament Players Championship	−10 (71-69-70-68=278)	1 stroke	(United States) Gene Littler
1984	U.S. Senior Open (2)	+6 (74-71-70-71=286)	2 strokes	(United States) Arnold Palmer
1985	U.S. Senior Open(3)	−3 (71-72-71-71=285)	4 strokes	(Argentina) Roberto De Vicenzo

== U.S. national team appearances ==
Professional

- Ryder Cup: 1969 (tie, cup retained), 1971 (winners)

== See also ==
- List of golfers with most PGA Tour Champions wins
- List of golfers with most Champions Tour major championship wins
