= The Champions Classic =

The Champions Classic was a golf tournament on the Champions Tour from 1983 to 1985. It was played in Sparks, Nevada at the Wildcreek Golf Club.

The purse for the 1985 tournament was US$200,000, with $30,000 going to the winner. The tournament was founded in 1983 as the Gatlin Brothers Seniors Golf Classic.

== Winners ==
The Champions Classic

- 1985 Peter Thomson

Gatlin Brothers Seniors Golf Classic

- 1984 Dan Sikes
- 1983 Don January
