= Uniting Fore Care Classic =

Golf tournament

The Uniting Fore Care Classic was a golf tournament on the Champions Tour from 1982 to 2002. It was played in Park City, Utah, at the Jeremy Ranch Golf Club (1982–1992) and the Park Meadows Golf Club (1993–2002). It was played at stroke play each year except in 2002 when it used a Modified Stableford scoring system. From 1983 to 1986, it was an unofficial tournament that paired a Senior PGA Tour player with a PGA Tour player in a two-man best-ball format.

Seven-time PGA Tour winner Bert Yancey died of a heart attack shortly before he was to tee it up in the 1994 edition of the tournament which was eventually won by his friend, Tom Weiskopf. Afterwards Weiskopf said he planned to have Yancey's name engraved on the tournament trophy not just his own.

The purse for the 2002 tournament was US$1,500,000, with $225,000 going to the winner. The tournament was founded in 1982 as the Shootout at Jeremy Ranch.

== Winners ==
Uniting Fore Care Classic presented by Novell

- 2002 Morris Hatalsky

Novell Utah Showdown

- 2001 Steve Veriato
- 2000 Doug Tewell
- 1999 Dave Eichelberger

Utah Showdown presented by Smith's

- 1998 Gil Morgan

Franklin Quest Championship

- 1997 Dave Stockton
- 1996 Graham Marsh
- 1995 Tony Jacklin
- 1994 Tom Weiskopf
- 1993 Dave Stockton

Franklin Showdown Classic

- 1992 Orville Moody

Showdown Classic

- 1991 Dale Douglass
- 1990 Rives McBee
- 1989 Tom Shaw
- 1988 Miller Barber
- 1987 Miller Barber
- 1986 Bobby Nichols and Curt Byrum (unofficial)

Shootout at Jeremy Ranch

- 1985 Miller Barber and Ben Crenshaw (unofficial)
- 1984 Don January and Mike Sullivan (unofficial)
- 1983 Bob Goalby and Mike Reid (unofficial)
- 1982 Billy Casper
