= Gulfstream Aerospace Invitational =

The Gulfstream Aerospace Invitational was a golf tournament on the Champions Tour from 1984 to 1993. It was played in Indian Wells, California at The Vintage Club (1981–1992) and at the Indian Wells Golf Resort (1993).

The purse for the 1993 tournament was US$550,000, with $82,500 going to the winner. The tournament was founded in 1981 as The Vintage Invitational.

== Winners ==
Gulfstream Aerospace Invitational

- 1993 Raymond Floyd

Vintage ARCO Invitational

- 1992 Mike Hill
- 1991 Chi-Chi Rodríguez

Vintage Chrysler Invitational

- 1990 Lee Trevino
- 1989 Miller Barber
- 1988 Orville Moody
- 1987 Bob Charles

Vintage Invitational

- 1986 Dale Douglass
- 1985 Peter Thomson
- 1984 Don January

unofficial

- 1983 Gene Littler
- 1982 Miller Barber
- 1981 Gene Littler
