= Denver Champions of Golf =

Golf tournament held in Colorado, U.S.

The Denver Champions of Golf was a golf tournament on the Champions Tour from 1982 to 1987. It was played in Denver, Colorado, US, at the Pinehurst Country Club (1982), at the Green Gables Country Club (1983), and in Castle Rock at the TPC at Plum Creek (1984–1987).

The purse for the 1987 tournament was US$250,000, with $37,500 going to the winner. The tournament was founded in 1982 as the Denver Post Champions of Golf.

== Winners ==
Denver Champions of Golf

- 1987 Bruce Crampton

Denver Post Champions of Golf

- 1986 Gary Player
- 1985 Lee Elder
- 1984 Miller Barber
- 1983 Don January
- 1982 Arnold Palmer
