= Seniors International Golf Championship =

The Seniors International Golf Championship was a golf tournament on the Champions Tour from 1982 to 1987. It was played in Hilton Head Island, South Carolina at the Shipyard Golf Club (1982–1984), at the Planters Row Golf Club (1985), and at the Harbour Town GL (1986–1987).

The purse for the 1987 tournament was US$250,000, with $37,500 going to the winner. The tournament was founded in 1982 as the Hilton Head Seniors International.

== Winners ==
The Seniors International Golf Championship

- 1987 Al Geiberger

Cuyahoga Seniors International

- 1986 Butch Baird

Hilton Head Seniors International

- 1985 Mike Fetchick
- 1984 Lee Elder
- 1983 Miller Barber
- 1982 Miller Barber and Dan Sikes (tie)
