= Bank of America Championship =

Golf tournament

The Bank of America Championship was a golf tournament on the Champions Tour from 1981 to 2008. It was played annually in June at the Nashawtuc Country Club in Concord, Massachusetts, United States. Bank of America was the main sponsor of the tournament.

The tournament was founded in 1981 as the Marlboro Classic. The Marlboro Classic was played at the Marlborough Country Club from 1981 to 1983. The purse for the 2008 tournament was US$1,650,000, with $247,500 for the winner.

== Winners ==
Bank of America Championship

- 2008 Jeff Sluman
- 2007 Jay Haas
- 2006 Cancelled due to rain and flooding
- 2005 Mark McNulty
- 2004 Craig Stadler

FleetBoston Classic

- 2003 Allen Doyle
- 2002 Bob Gilder
- 2001 Larry Nelson
- 2000 Larry Nelson

BankBoston Classic

- 1999 Tom McGinnis
- 1998 Hale Irwin
- 1997 Hale Irwin

Bank of Boston Senior Classic

- 1996 Jim Dent
- 1995 Isao Aoki

Bank of Boston Senior Golf Classic

- 1994 Jim Albus
- 1993 Bob Betley

Digital Seniors Classic

- 1992 Mike Hill
- 1991 Rocky Thompson
- 1990 Bob Charles
- 1989 Bob Charles
- 1988 Chi-Chi Rodríguez
- 1987 Chi-Chi Rodríguez
- 1986 Chi-Chi Rodríguez
- 1985 Lee Elder

Digital Middlesex Classic

- 1984 Don January

Marlboro Classic

- 1983 Don January
- 1982 Arnold Palmer
- 1981 Bob Goalby
