= Fairfield Barnett Space Coast Classic =

The Fairfield Barnett Space Coast Classic was a golf tournament on the Champions Tour from 1980 to 1990. It was played in Melbourne, Florida at the Suntree Country Club.

The purse for the 1990 tournament was US$300,000, with $45,000 going to the winner. The tournament was founded in 1980 as the Suntree Classic.

== Winners ==
Fairfield Barnett Space Coast Classic

- 1990 Mike Hill
- 1989 Bob Charles

Fairfield Barnett Classic

- 1988 Miller Barber

Fairfield Barnett Senior Classic

- 1987 Dave Hill

Fairfield Barnett Classic

- 1986 Dale Douglass

Barnett Suntree Senior Classic

- 1985 Peter Thomson

Suntree Senior Classic

- 1984 Lee Elder

Suntree Classic

- 1983 Don January
- 1982 Miller Barber

Suntree Seniors Classic

- 1981 Miller Barber

Suntree Classic

- 1980 Charlie Sifford
