= PGA Tour Champions =

US-based golf tour for men 50 and older

- Current season, competition or edition: 2026 PGA Tour Champions season
- Formerly: Senior PGA Tour (1980–2002); Champions Tour (2003–2015)
- Sport: Golf
- Founded: 1980
- Founder: PGA Tour
- First season: 1980
- Country: Based in the United States (Note: Schedules have also included events in Canada, China, Dominican Republic, England, Japan, Mexico, Morocco, Northern Ireland, Portugal, Puerto Rico, Scotland, South Korea and Wales.)
- Most titles: Money list titles: (Germany) Bernhard Langer (11); Tournament wins: (Germany) Bernhard Langer (47)
- Broadcaster: Golf Channel
- Related competitions: PGA Tour
- Website: https://www.pgatour.com/pgatour-champions

PGA Tour Champions (formerly the Senior PGA Tour and the Champions Tour) is a men's professional senior golf tour, open to golfers age 50 and over, administered as a branch of the PGA Tour.

== History and format ==
The Senior PGA Championship, founded in 1937, was for many years the only high-profile tournament for golfers over 50. The idea for a senior tour grew out of a highly successful event in 1978, the Legends of Golf at Onion Creek Club in Austin, Texas, which featured competition between two-member teams of some of the greatest older golfers of that day. The tour was formally established in 1980 and was originally known as the Senior PGA Tour until October 2002. The tour was then renamed the Champions Tour through the 2015 season, after which the current name of "PGA Tour Champions" was adopted.

Of the 26 tournaments on the 2010 schedule, all were in the United States except for the Cap Cana Championship in the Dominican Republic, the Senior Open Championship in Scotland and tournaments in Canada and South Korea. The guaranteed minimum official prize money is $51.5 million over 26 tournaments, with a record average purse of $1.98 million per event; slightly higher than the 2008 prize money of $51.4 million over the same number of events. The total prize money and number of events, however, are down from previous years—for example, the 2007 tour offered a total of $55.2 million over 29 events.

Most of the tournaments are played over three rounds (54 holes), which is one round fewer than regular professional stroke play tournaments on the PGA Tour. Because of this and having smaller fields (81 golfers), there are generally no "cuts" between any of the rounds. However, the five senior majors have a full 72 holes (four rounds) with a 36-hole cut. Until 2015, the season-ending Charles Schwab Cup Championship, with a limited field of 36, was played over 72 holes with no cut. Since 2016, it has been played over 54 holes with no cut. A golfer's performances can be quite variable from one round to the next, and playing an extra round increases the likelihood that the senior majors will be won by leading players.

Through the 2015 season, the Charles Schwab Cup was a season-long points race. Points were given to players who finished in the top 10. One point was earned for each $1,000 won (i.e. $500,000 = 500 points) with majors counting double. From the Cup's inception in 1990 through 2015, the top 30 players competed in the Charles Schwab Cup Championship, which was contested over four rounds and where all contestants earned points. The top five finishers in the points race earned annuities.

In 2016, the format of the Charles Schwab Cup was radically changed to a playoff-style format similar to that used for the FedEx Cup on the main PGA Tour. Qualification for the playoffs is now based on money earned during the PGA Tour Champions season. The top 72 players on the money list automatically qualify for the first playoff event, the PowerShares QQQ Championship. Additionally, if one or more golfers finish in the top 10 in the final non-playoff event, the SAS Championship, and are not in the top 72 on the money list entering the playoffs, the highest such finisher in the SAS Championship will also receive a playoff place. The playoffs operate on a points system, with each qualifying player receiving a points total equal to the money earned on the season. Points during the first two playoff events, the QQQ Championship and Dominion Charity Classic, are also based on money earned, except that the winner of each of those events receives double points. The playoff field is cut to 54 for the Dominion Charity Classic, and finally to 36 for the Charles Schwab Cup Championship. After the Dominion Charity Classic, the field's points are reset so that each of the remaining 36 players can theoretically win the Charles Schwab Cup, and that each of the top five players can clinch the Charles Schwab Cup by winning the final event.

In 2006, the Champions Tour Division Board of the PGA Tour organization voted to allow players the option to use golf carts during most events on the tour. The five major championships and certain other events, including pro-ams, are excluded.

== Exemptions and qualifying ==
Current PGA Tour Champions competitor and TV golf analyst Bobby Clampett has called the process for determining the field in tour events "the most complicated system known to man," and added that "[n]ot a single player even understands it fully."

Clampett attempted to explain the process in a 2011 post on his blog. Standard tour events—apart from invitationals and majors, which have their own entry criteria—have a field of 78 (currently 81). The first 60 places in the field are filled as follows:

- The top 30 players, not otherwise exempt, who finished in the top 50 of the previous year's PGA Tour Champions money list.
- Up to 30 players who are in the top 70 of the all-time combined PGA Tour and PGA Tour Champions money list.

This leaves 18 places:

- Members of the World Golf Hall of Fame eligible by age.
- Winners of PGA Tour Champions events in the previous 12 months.
- At the start of the season, 5 players from the previous year's PGA Tour Champions Qualifying Tournament, in order of finish. During July, this category changes to include all non-exempt players based on the season's money list.
- Previously exempt players coming off medical exemptions.
- Top four players in their first two years of age eligibility with multiple PGA Tour wins.
- One spot for the highest finisher, not already exempt, within the top 10 of the previous week's tournament. Note, however, that a top-10 finish in a regular tournament does not qualify a player for a major. In another quirk, a top-10 finish in a major does not qualify a player for the next tournament on the schedule, even if it is a regular tournament.
- Up to 5 spots for sponsor's exemptions, but subject to reduction or elimination if the previous categories fill out the field.
- Up to 4 spots for Monday qualifiers, also subject to reduction or elimination

== Money list winners ==
Season	Winner	Prize money ($)
2026	(United States) Stewart Cink (2)	4,399,265
2025	(United States) Stewart Cink	3,247,147
2024	(New Zealand) Steven Alker (2)	2,447,588
2023	(United States) Steve Stricker	3,986,063
2022	(New Zealand) Steven Alker	3,544,425
2020–21	(Germany) Bernhard Langer (11)	3,255,499
2019	(United States) Scott McCarron	2,534,090
2018	(Germany) Bernhard Langer (10)	2,222,154
2017	(Germany) Bernhard Langer (9)	3,677,359
2016	(Germany) Bernhard Langer (8)	3,016,959
2015	(Germany) Bernhard Langer (7)	2,340,288
2014	(Germany) Bernhard Langer (6)	3,074,189
2013	(Germany) Bernhard Langer (5)	2,448,428
2012	(Germany) Bernhard Langer (4)	2,140,296
2011	(United States) Tom Lehman	2,081,526
2010	(Germany) Bernhard Langer (3)	2,648,939
2009	(Germany) Bernhard Langer (2)	2,139,451
2008	(Germany) Bernhard Langer	2,035,073
2007	(United States) Jay Haas (2)	2,581,001
2006	(United States) Jay Haas	2,420,227
2005	(United States) Dana Quigley	2,170,258
2004	(United States) Craig Stadler	2,306,066
2003	(United States) Tom Watson	1,853,108
2002	(United States) Hale Irwin (3)	3,028,304
2001	(United States) Allen Doyle	2,553,582
2000	(United States) Larry Nelson	2,708,005
1999	(United States) Bruce Fleisher	2,515,705
1998	(United States) Hale Irwin (2)	2,861,945
1997	(United States) Hale Irwin	2,343,364
1996	(United States) Jim Colbert (2)	1,627,890
1995	(United States) Jim Colbert	1,444,386
1994	(United States) Dave Stockton (2)	1,402,519
1993	(United States) Dave Stockton	1,175,944
1992	(United States) Lee Trevino (2)	1,027,002
1991	(United States) Mike Hill	1,065,657
1990	(United States) Lee Trevino	1,190,518
1989	(New Zealand) Bob Charles (2)	725,887
1988	(New Zealand) Bob Charles	533,929
1987	(United States) Chi-Chi Rodríguez	509,145
1986	(Australia) Bruce Crampton	454,299
1985	(Australia) Peter Thomson	386,724
1984	(United States) Don January (3)	328,597
1983	(United States) Don January (2)	237,571
1982	(United States) Miller Barber (2)	106,890
1981	(United States) Miller Barber	83,136
1980	(United States) Don January	44,100

=== Multiple winners ===
Rank	Player	Wins	Years won
1	(Germany) Bernhard Langer	11	2008, 2009, 2010, 2012, 2013, 2014, 2015, 2016, 2017, 2018, 2020–21
T2	(United States) Hale Irwin	3	1997, 1998, 2002
T2	(United States) Don January	3	1980, 1983, 1984
T4	(New Zealand) Steven Alker	2	2022, 2024
T4	(United States) Miller Barber	2	1981, 1982
T4	(New Zealand) Bob Charles	2	1988, 1989
T4	(United States) Stewart Cink	2	2025, 2026
T4	(United States) Jim Colbert	2	1995, 1996
T4	(United States) Jay Haas	2	2006, 2007
T4	(United States) Dave Stockton	2	1993, 1994
T4	(United States) Lee Trevino	2	1990, 1992

== Leading career money winners ==
The table shows the top ten career money leaders on PGA Tour Champions through the 2026 season.

Rank	Player	Prize money ($)
1	(Germany) Bernhard Langer	38,797,584
2	(United States) Hale Irwin	27,158,515
3	(United States) Gil Morgan	20,631,930
4	(United States) Jay Haas	20,131,270
5	(Spain) Miguel Ángel Jiménez	19,120,754
6	(United States) Jerry Kelly	16,406,137
7	(United States) Tom Kite	16,303,747
8	(New Zealand) Steven Alker	15,442,006
9	(United States) Tom Watson	15,074,227
10	(United States) Dana Quigley	14,898,463

The PGA Tour also publishes a list of PGA Tour Champions players' total career earnings on its three main tours.

== See also ==
- Golf in the United States
- Senior major golf championships
- List of Champions Tour major championship winning golfers
- List of golfers with most PGA Tour Champions wins
- PGA Tour Champions awards
- PGA Tour Champions records
