= 1967 PGA Championship =

Golf tournament held in 1967

Coordinates: 39.60°N 105.036°W

Tournament information
- Dates: July 20–24, 1967
- Location: Columbine Valley, Colorado
- Course: Columbine Country Club
- Organized by: PGA of America
- Tour: PGA Tour

Statistics
- Par: 72
- Length: 7,436 yards (6,799 m)
- Field: 143 players, 75 after cut
- Cut: 151 (+7)
- Prize fund: $148,200
- Winner's share: $25,000

Champion
- (United States) Don January
- 281 (−7), playoff

Location in United States

The 1967 PGA Championship was the 49th PGA Championship, played July 20–24 at Columbine Country Club in Columbine Valley, Colorado, a suburb south of Denver. Don January won his only major title in an 18-hole playoff over Don Massengale (69–71). Both had overtaken the leaders with low scores in the fourth round on Sunday.

Columbine was scheduled to host the championship in 1966, but flooding of the course by the South Platte River caused a postponement of a year. Firestone Country Club in Ohio, scheduled to host in 1967, swapped years with Columbine and was the site of the tournament in 1966.

There was a possibility of a boycott of the championship by the top tournament players, due to grievances with the PGA of America. An understanding was achieved several weeks before and the top players entered.

At the time, Columbine was the longest course in major championship history at 7,436 yards (6,799 m). The elevation of the course is over 5,300 feet (1,620 m) above sea level, additionally dry and fast conditions shortened its effective length. Tommy Aaron carded a course record 65 in the second round to take a four-stroke lead, but a 76 on Saturday dropped him two back and he fell out of contention on Sunday with a 78. The 54-hole leader was Dan Sikes, the chairman of the tournament players committee, who shot a final round 73 and finished a stroke out of the playoff, in a tie for third with Jack Nicklaus.

This was the second and final 18-hole Monday playoff at the PGA Championship, formerly a match play event through 1957. The next playoff was ten years later in 1977 and the format was changed to sudden-death, immediately following the fourth round. It was later changed to a three-hole aggregate format, first used in 2000.

The Open Championship was played the previous week near Liverpool, England, one of five times in the 1960s that these two majors were played in consecutive weeks in July. The PGA Championship moved permanently to August in 1969, where it remained through 2018 (except 1971, when it was played in late February). In 2019, the tournament moved to the weekend before Memorial Day.

== Round summaries ==
=== First round ===
Thursday, July 20, 1967

Place	Player	Score	To par
1	(United States) Dave Hill	66	−6
2	(United States) Jack Nicklaus	67	−5
T3	(United States) Don Bies	69	−3
T3	(United States) Julius Boros	69	−3
T3	(United States) Davis Love Jr.	69	−3
T3	(United States) Dan Sikes	69	−3
T7	(United States) Tommy Aaron	70	−2
T7	(United States) Rich Bassett	70	−2
T7	(United States) Bob Goalby	70	−2
T7	(United States) Don Massengale	70	−2
T7	(United States) Arnold Palmer	70	−2
T7	(United States) Mike Souchak	70	−2

=== Second round ===
Friday, July 21, 1967

Place	Player	Score	To par
1	(United States) Tommy Aaron	70-65=135	−9
T2	(United States) Don Bies	69-70=139	−5
T2	(United States) Dave Hill	66-73=139	−5
T2	(United States) Dan Sikes	69-70=139	−5
5	(United States) Arnold Palmer	70-71=141	−3
6	(United States) Jack Nicklaus	67-75=142	−2
T7	(United States) Bill Bisdorf	72-71=143	−1
T7	(United States) Raymond Floyd	74-69=143	−1
T7	(United States) Don January	71-72=143	−1
T7	(United States) R. H. Sikes	72-71=143	−1
T7	(United States) Mike Souchak	70-73=143	−1
T7	(United States) Dudley Wysong	73-70=143	−1

=== Third round ===
Saturday, July 22, 1967

Place	Player	Score	To par
1	(United States) Dan Sikes	69-70-70=209	−7
T2	(United States) Tommy Aaron	70-65-76=211	−5
T2	(United States) Jack Nicklaus	67-75-69=211	−5
4	(United States) Bob Goalby	70-74-68=212	−4
T5	(United States) Al Geiberger	73-71-69=213	−3
T5	(United States) Dave Hill	66-73-74=213	−3
T5	(United States) Don January	71-72-70=213	−3
T5	(United States) Arnold Palmer	70-71-72=213	−3
T5	(United States) R. H. Sikes	71-71-71=213	−3
T5	(United States) Mike Souchak	70-73-70=213	−3

=== Final round ===
Sunday, July 23, 1967

Place	Player	Score	To par	Money ($)
T1	(United States) Don January	71-72-70-68=281	−7	Playoff
T1	(United States) Don Massengale	70-75-70-66=281	−7	Playoff
T3	(United States) Jack Nicklaus	67-75-69-71=282	−6	9,000
T3	(United States) Dan Sikes	69-70-70-73=282	−6	9,000
T5	(United States) Julius Boros	69-76-70-68=283	−5	6,500
T5	(United States) Al Geiberger	73-71-69-70=283	−5	6,500
T7	(United States) Frank Beard	71-74-70-70=285	−3	4,750
T7	(United States) Don Bies	69-70-76-70=285	−3	4,750
T7	(United States) Bob Goalby	70-74-68-73=285	−3	4,750
T7	(United States) Gene Littler	73-72-71-69=285	−3	4,750

=== Playoff ===
Monday, July 24, 1967

Place	Player	Score	To par	Money ($)
1	(United States) Don January	36-33=69	−3	25,000
2	(United States) Don Massengale	36-35=71	−1	15,000

==== Scorecard ====
Hole	1	2	3	4	5	6	7	8	9	10	11	12	13	14	15	16	17	18
Par	4	5	3	4	4	4	3	5	4	3	4	5	5	4	4	3	4	4
(United States) January	E	E	E	+1	+1	+1	+1	E	E	−1	−1	−2	−2	−3	−4	−4	−3	−3
(United States) Massengale	E	E	E	E	−1	−1	E	E	E	E	E	−1	−1	−2	−2	−2	−1	−1

Birdie	Bogey
