= NEC World Series of Golf =

Golf tournament

Coordinates: 41.008°N 81.508°W

Tournament information
- Location: Akron, Ohio
- Established: 1962
- Courses: Firestone Country Club (South Course)
- Par: 70
- Length: 7,139 yards (6,528 m)
- Tour: PGA Tour
- Format: Stroke play
- Prize fund: US$2,250,000
- Month played: August
- Final year: 1998

Tournament record score
- Aggregate: 262 José María Olazábal (1990)
- To par: −18 as above

Final champion
- (United States) David Duval
- Location in the United States Location in Ohio

The World Series of Golf was a professional golf tournament on the PGA Tour, played at Firestone Country Club in Akron, Ohio. From its inception in 1962 through 1975, it was an unofficial 36-hole event matching the winners of the four major championships. In 1976 it became an official PGA Tour event; the field expanded to 20 players and the event was lengthened to 72 holes. the victory and $100,000 winner's share went to Nicklaus. The field was increased to over 40 players in 1983, though it never exceeded 50; NEC began sponsoring the event in 1984.

The tournament was last played in 1998, but was replaced by the newly created WGC-NEC Invitational in 1999. Firestone Country Club had hosted that tournament (later known as the WGC-Bridgestone Invitational) every year until 2019, except for 2002.

== History ==
=== Invitation era ===
The World Series of Golf was founded as a four-man invitational event in 1962, comprising the winners of the four major championships in a 36-hole event. In the made-for-television tournament, the competitors played in one group for $75,000 in unofficial prize money, televised by NBC.

The inaugural edition in September 1962 included only the "Big Three" of Arnold Palmer, Jack Nicklaus, and Gary Player. Palmer had won two majors that year and a fourth competitor was not added. Palmer shot a course record 65 in the first round on Saturday, but fell back with a 74 on Sunday. Nicklaus won with 135, four strokes ahead of Palmer and Player. Nicklaus, age 22, won a then-staggering $50,000, with $15,000 for second and $5,000 each for third and fourth, split between the other two for $12,500 each. Opposite this competition was the regular tour event in Denver, which had a winner's share of $4,300. The highest paying major at the time was the Masters with a winner's share of $20,000; Nicklaus had won $17,500 at the U.S. Open at Oakmont, which included a sizable $2,500 playoff bonus from the extra day's gate receipts, well-attended due to the presence of favorite son Palmer. At the time of his big Akron payday, the U.S. Open was Nicklaus' only tour victory as a rookie, but he won the next two events at Seattle ($4,300) and Portland ($3,500).

In 1963, Nicklaus won two majors, so a fourth player was added to the World Series via an 18-hole playoff between the three men who had lost playoffs in that year's majors; Palmer and Jacky Cupit in the U.S. Open and Phil Rodgers in the Open Championship. Palmer prevailed by five strokes in the August playoff. Nicklaus repeated as the World Series winner in September, one stroke ahead of Julius Boros, with Palmer in third and Bob Charles in fourth. The opposite tour event in 1963 was the Utah Open in Salt Lake City, with a winner's share of $6,400.

The first year with four players as reigning major champions was 1964, the first without Nicklaus. Tony Lema took the top spot, followed by Ken Venturi, Bobby Nichols, and Palmer. This was also the first year without a concurrent PGA Tour event.

In the final year of the four-man format in 1975, Tom Watson won with a two-stroke advantage over runner-up Nicklaus. The money was the same as in 1962, except that third place received $7,500, claimed by Tom Weiskopf. Nicklaus had won his second major of the year, the PGA Championship, at the same course a month earlier. In the fourteen editions of the event, Nicklaus played in ten, won four, and finished as runner-up in six.

In subsequent years, if one had won multiple majors, the alternate was the winner of the Western Open or Canadian Open.

The format of the four major winners in a 36-hole competition was later adopted by the PGA of America in 1979 for its PGA Grand Slam of Golf, last held in 2014.

From 1961 through 1976, Firestone also hosted the American Golf Classic on the South course. It was not played in the years of the PGA Championship (1960, 1966, 1975), and the final edition in 1976 was played on the par-72 North course, with the World Series on the South course the following week.

=== PGA Tour event ===
In 1976, it became a 72-hole, $300,000 PGA Tour event and its field was initially expanded to twenty; the victory and $100,000 winner's share went to Nicklaus. The largest first prize at a major that year was $45,000 at the PGA Championship.

The World Series of Golf quickly became a leading event on the tour. For many years a victory in it gave a 10-year exemption on the PGA Tour, the same as was granted for a victory in a major championship at that time, and twice as long as is given even for winning a major now. The field consisted of the winners of all the high status men's professional golf tournaments around the world in the previous twelve months.

The field was expanded in 1984 to include some international players, all tour event winners, and the top fifteen on the current money list, with 47 players eligible. The expansion wasn't well-received by all players, and a notable absence was Seve Ballesteros of Spain, who opted out.

== Winners ==
=== PGA Tour event ===
Year	Winner	Score	To par	Margin of victory	Runner(s)-up	Winner's share ($)
NEC World Series of Golf
1998	(United States) David Duval	269	−11	2 strokes	(United States) Phil Mickelson	405,000
1997	(Australia) Greg Norman (2)	273	−7	4 strokes	(United States) Phil Mickelson	396,000
1996	(United States) Phil Mickelson	274	−6	3 strokes	(United States) Billy Mayfair (United States) Duffy Waldorf (United States) Steve Stricker	378,000
1995	(Australia) Greg Norman	278	−2	Playoff	(United States) Billy Mayfair (Zimbabwe) Nick Price	360,000
1994	(Spain) José María Olazábal (2)	269	−11	1 stroke	(United States) Scott Hoch	360,000
1993	(South Africa) Fulton Allem	270	−10	5 strokes	(United States) Jim Gallagher Jr. (Zimbabwe) Nick Price (United States) Craig Stadler	360,000
1992	(United States) Craig Stadler (2)	273	−7	1 stroke	(United States) Corey Pavin	252,000
1991	(United States) Tom Purtzer	279	−1	Playoff	(United States) Jim Gallagher Jr. (United States) Davis Love III	216,000
1990	(Spain) José María Olazábal	262	−18	12 strokes	(United States) Lanny Wadkins	198,000
1989	(South Africa) David Frost	276	−4	Playoff	(United States) Ben Crenshaw	180,000
1988	(United States) Mike Reid	275	−5	Playoff	(United States) Tom Watson	162,000
1987	(United States) Curtis Strange	275	−5	3 strokes	(South Africa) Fulton Allem	144,000
1986	(United States) Dan Pohl	277	−3	1 stroke	(United States) Lanny Wadkins	126,000
1985	(United States) Roger Maltbie	268	−12	4 strokes	(Zimbabwe) Denis Watson	126,000
1984	(Zimbabwe) Denis Watson	271	−9	2 strokes	(United States) Bruce Lietzke	126,000
World Series of Golf
1983	(Zimbabwe) Nick Price	270	−10	4 strokes	(United States) Jack Nicklaus	100,000
1982	(United States) Craig Stadler	278	−2	Playoff	(United States) Raymond Floyd	100,000
1981	(United States) Bill Rogers	275	−5	1 stroke	(United States) Tom Kite	100,000
1980	(United States) Tom Watson	270	−10	2 strokes	(United States) Raymond Floyd	100,000
1979	(United States) Lon Hinkle	272	−8	1 stroke	(United States) Larry Nelson (United States) Bill Rogers (United States) Lee Trevino	100,000
1978	(United States) Gil Morgan	278	−2	Playoff	(United States) Hubert Green	100,000
1977	(United States) Lanny Wadkins	267	−13	5 strokes	(United States) Hale Irwin (United States) Tom Weiskopf	100,000
1976	(United States) Jack Nicklaus	275	−5	4 strokes	(United States) Hale Irwin	100,000

=== Unofficial event ===
Year	Winner	Runner(s)-up	Third	Fourth
World Series of Golf
1975	(United States) Tom Watson	(United States) Jack Nicklaus	(United States) Tom Weiskopf	(United States) Lou Graham
1974	(United States) Lee Trevino	(South Africa) Gary Player	(United States) Bobby Nichols	(United States) Hale Irwin
1973	(United States) Tom Weiskopf	(T2) (United States) Jack Nicklaus, (United States) Johnny Miller		(United States) Tommy Aaron
1972	(South Africa) Gary Player	(T2) (United States) Jack Nicklaus, (United States) Lee Trevino		(United States) Gay Brewer
1971	(United States) Charles Coody	(United States) Jack Nicklaus	(United States) Lee Trevino	(Australia) Bruce Crampton
1970	(United States) Jack Nicklaus	(T2) (United States) Billy Casper, (United States) Dave Stockton		(England) Tony Jacklin
1969	(United States) Orville Moody	(United States) George Archer	(T3) (England) Tony Jacklin, (United States) Raymond Floyd	
1968	(South Africa) Gary Player	(United States) Bob Goalby	(United States) Julius Boros	(United States) Lee Trevino
1967	(United States) Jack Nicklaus	(United States) Gay Brewer	(Argentina) Roberto De Vicenzo	(United States) Don January
1966	(United States) Gene Littler	(T2) (United States) Jack Nicklaus, (United States) Al Geiberger		(United States) Billy Casper
1965	(South Africa) Gary Player	(United States) Jack Nicklaus	(Australia) Peter Thomson	(United States) Dave Marr
1964	(United States) Tony Lema	(United States) Ken Venturi	(United States) Bobby Nichols	(United States) Arnold Palmer
1963	(United States) Jack Nicklaus	(United States) Julius Boros	(United States) Arnold Palmer (Note: Palmer won an 18-hole playoff against Jacky Cupit and Bill Rogers the two other runners-up in the two majors' playoffs in 1963. The playoff was required as Jack Nicklaus had won two majors that year. The playoff would decide the fourth player to take place in the event.)	(New Zealand) Bob Charles
1962 (Note: Palmer had won two majors in 1962, and no fourth player was added to the event.)	(United States) Jack Nicklaus	(T2) (United States) Arnold Palmer, (South Africa) Gary Player		

Place	Money ($)
1	50,000
2	15,000
3	7,500^
4	5,000

^ Third place was $5,000 in the first three editions (1962–1964)
