= 1966 PGA Championship =

Coordinates: 41.008°N 81.508°W

Tournament information
- Dates: July 21–24, 1966
- Location: Akron, Ohio
- Course(s): Firestone Country Club; South Course
- Organized by: PGA of America
- Tour: PGA Tour

Statistics
- Par: 70
- Length: 7,180 yards (6,565 m)
- Field: 162 players, 77 after cut
- Cut: 151 (+11)
- Prize fund: $149,360
- Winner's share: $25,000

Champion
- (United States) Al Geiberger
- 280 (Even)

Location in the United States
Location in Ohio

The 1966 PGA Championship was the 48th PGA Championship, played July 21–24 at the South Course of Firestone Country Club in Akron, Ohio. Al Geiberger won his only major championship, four strokes ahead of runner-up Dudley Wysong.

Sam Snead, age 54, was co-leader and leader after the first two days, but shot 75 in the third round on Saturday. Geiberger carded a two-under 68 to lead by four strokes over Wysong, who shot a 66. Both shot two-over 72 on Sunday as both bogeyed the first two holes. The lead shrank to two as Wysong birdied the third while Geiberger bogeyed the fourth, but then birdied the fifth and ninth holes to regain the four-stroke advantage.

The 1966 championship was originally scheduled to be held at Columbine Country Club in Columbine Valley, Colorado, a suburb south of Denver. A flash flood of the adjacent South Platte River in June 1965 caused significant damage to the course and forced a postponement. Firestone was scheduled to host in 1967, so the venues swapped years.

This was the second of three PGA Championships at the South Course, which previously hosted in 1960 and later in 1975. It is the current venue for the WGC-Bridgestone Invitational, which began in 1976 as the "World Series of Golf" on the PGA Tour, preceded by the American Golf Classic, which debuted in 1961.

== Course layout ==
Hole	1	2	3	4	5	6	7	8	9	Out	10	11	12	13	14	15	16	17	18	In	Total
Yards	400	500	450	465	230	465	225	450	465	3,650	405	365	180	460	410	230	625	390	465	3,530	7,180
Par	4	5	4	4	3	4	3	4	4	35	4	4	3	4	4	3	5	4	4	35	70

== Round summaries ==
=== First round ===
Thursday, July 21, 1966

Place	Player	Score	To par
T1	(United States) Al Geiberger	68	−2
T1	(United States) Sam Snead	68	−2
T3	(United States) Julius Boros	69	−1
T3	(United States) Don January	69	−1
T3	(United States) Doug Sanders	69	−1
6	(United States) Jacky Cupit	70	E
T7	(United States) Tommy Aaron	71	+1
T7	(United States) Larry Beck	71	+1
T7	(Australia) Jim Ferrier	71	+1
T7	(United States) Jack Fleck	71	+1
T7	(United States) Walker Inman	71	+1

=== Second round ===
Friday, July 22, 1966

Place	Player	Score	To par
1	(United States) Sam Snead	68-71=139	−1
T2	(United States) Al Geiberger	68-72=140	E
T2	(United States) Don January	69-71=140	E
4	(United States) Julius Boros	69-72=141	+1
T5	(United States) Tommy Aaron	71-72=143	+3
T5	(United States) Jacky Cupit	70-73=143	+3
T5	(United States) Billy Farrell	73-70=143	+3
T5	(South Africa) Gary Player	73-70=143	+3
T5	(United States) Doug Sanders	69-74=143	+3
10	(United States) Dow Finsterwald	74-70=144	+4

=== Third round ===
Saturday, July 23, 1966

Place	Player	Score	To par
1	(United States) Al Geiberger	68-72-68=208	−2
2	(United States) Dudley Wysong	74-72-66=212	+2
T3	(United States) Don January	69-71-73=213	+3
T3	(South Africa) Gary Player	73-70-70=213	+3
T5	(United States) Frank Beard	73-72-69=214	+4
T5	(United States) Billy Farrell	73-70-71=214	+4
T5	(United States) Sam Snead	68-71-75=214	+4
T8	(United States) Julius Boros	69-72-75=216	+6
T8	(United States) Billy Casper	73-73-70=216	+6
T8	(United States) Jacky Cupit	70-73-73=216	+6

=== Final round ===
Sunday, July 24, 1966

Place	Player	Score	To par	Money ($)
1	(United States) Al Geiberger	68-72-68-72=280	E	25,000
2	(United States) Dudley Wysong	74-72-66-72=284	+4	15,000
T3	(United States) Billy Casper	73-73-70-70=286	+6	8,334
T3	(United States) Gene Littler	75-71-71-69=286	+6	8,334
T3	(South Africa) Gary Player	73-70-70-73=286	+6	8,334
T6	(United States) Julius Boros	69-72-75-71=287	+7	5,000
T6	(United States) Jacky Cupit	70-73-73-71=287	+7	5,000
T6	(United States) Arnold Palmer	75-73-71-68=287	+7	5,000
T6	(United States) Doug Sanders	69-74-73-71=287	+7	5,000
T6	(United States) Sam Snead	68-71-75-73=287	+7	5,000

== Lema and wife killed ==
Hours after the championship's conclusion on Sunday, Tony Lema and his wife Betty were among four fatalities in a chartered private plane crash near the Indiana-Illinois border. Lema, age 32, had finished tied for 34th and was heading west to a Monday tournament in the Chicago area. Both pilots of the twin-engine Beechcraft Bonanza were also killed as they attempted an emergency landing on a golf course in Lansing, Illinois, near the destination airport.
