= 1960 PGA Championship =

Coordinates: 41.008°N 81.508°W

Tournament information
- Dates: July 21–24, 1960
- Location: Akron, Ohio
- Course(s): Firestone Country Club; South Course
- Organized by: PGA of America
- Tour: PGA Tour
- Format: Stroke play

Statistics
- Par: 70
- Length: 7,165 yards (6,552 m)
- Field: 183 players, 95 after 1st cut 60 after 2nd cut
- Cut: 151 (+11) (1st cut); 224 (+14) (2nd cut)
- Prize fund: $63,130
- Winner's share: $11,000

Champion
- (United States) Jay Hebert
- 281 (+1)

Location in the United States
Location in Ohio

The 1960 PGA Championship was the 42nd PGA Championship, played July 21–24 at the South Course of Firestone Country Club in Akron, Ohio. Jay Hebert won his only major championship, one stroke ahead of runner-up Jim Ferrier, the 1947 champion. Only one player broke par in the final round; Wes Ellis shot 69 (−1) and finished in sixth place. Hebert's younger brother Lionel won the title in 1957, the last PGA Championship contested in match play format.

Third round leader Doug Sanders shot 73 (+3) on Sunday and finished two strokes back in a tie for third. Arnold Palmer, reigning champion of the Masters and U.S. Open, carded a triple-bogey eight on the 16th hole on Saturday, and finished five strokes back.

Palmer was attempting to win a third major in 1960; in addition to his wins at the Masters and U.S. Open, he was runner-up by a stroke at the British Open at St Andrews. At Firestone, Palmer opened with a 67 for the first round lead, but fell off the pace late on Saturday and tied for seventh; he won seven majors but never a PGA Championship. Through 2017, no player has won all three U.S. majors (Masters, U.S. Open, PGA) in the same calendar year.

Two-time champion Ben Hogan played in the PGA Championship for the first time since his match play victory in 1948. A third round 78 (+8) left him at 225 (+15) and he missed the 54-hole cut by one stroke.

Attendance figures were 14,141 for Sunday's final round, with a four-day total of 53,509.

This was the first of three PGA Championships at the South Course, which later hosted in 1966 and 1975. It is the current venue for the WGC-Bridgestone Invitational, which began in 1976 as the World Series of Golf on the PGA Tour. The American Golf Classic was held at Firestone 's south course from 1961 to 1975.

== Course layout ==
South Course

Hole	1	2	3	4	5	6	7	8	9	Out	10	11	12	13	14	15	16	17	18	In	Total
Yards	400	500	450	465	230	450	225	450	465	3,635	405	365	180	460	410	230	625	390	465	3,530	7,165
Par	4	5	4	4	3	4	3	4	4	35	4	4	3	4	4	3	5	4	4	35	70

== Round summaries ==
=== First round ===
Thursday, July 21, 1960

Place	Player	Score	To par
1	(United States) Arnold Palmer	67	−3
2	(United States) Sam Snead	68	−2
T3	(United States) Fred Haas	69	−1
T3	(United States) Paul Harney	69	−1
T5	(United States) Don Fairfield	70	E
T5	(United States) Don January	70	E
T5	(United States) Doug Sanders	70	E
T8	(United States) George Bayer	71	+1
T8	(United States) Al Besselink	71	+1
T8	(United States) Bill Collins	71	+1
T8	(United States) Jim Ferree	71	+1
T8	(United States) Jim Ferrier	71	+1
T8	(United States) Ed Griffiths	71	+1
T8	(United States) Bob Harris	71	+1
T8	(United States) John O'Donnell	71	+1
T8	(United States) Ernie Vossler	71	+1
T8	(United States) Don Whitt	71	+1

=== Second round ===
Friday, July 22, 1960

Place	Player	Score	To par
1	(United States) Jay Hebert	72-67=139	−1
2	(United States) Don January	70-70=140	E
T3	(United States) Arnold Palmer	67-74=141	+1
T3	(United States) Doug Sanders	70-71=141	+1
T3	(United States) Sam Snead	68-73=141	+1
T6	(United States) Fred Hawkins	73-69=142	+2
T6	(United States) John O'Donnell	71-71=142	+2
T6	(United States) Ken Venturi	70-72=142	+2
9	(United States) Mason Rudolph	72-71=143	+3
T10	(United States) George Bayer	71-73=144	+4
T10	(United States) Tommy Bolt	72-72=144	+4
T10	(United States) Wes Ellis	72-72=144	+4
T10	(United States) Ted Kroll	73-71=144	+4
T10	(United States) Gene Littler	74-70=144	+4

=== Third round ===
Saturday, July 23, 1960

Place	Player	Score	To par
1	(United States) Doug Sanders	70-71-69=210	E
T2	(United States) Jim Ferrier	71-74-66=211	+1
T2	(United States) Jay Hebert	72-67-72=211	+1
T2	(United States) Sam Snead	68-73-70=211	+1
5	(United States) Don January	70-70-72=212	+2
T6	(United States) Doug Ford	75-70-69=214	+4
T6	(United States) Fred Hawkins	73-69-72=214	+4
T8	(United States) Dow Finsterwald	73-73-69=215	+5
T8	(United States) Dave Marr	75-71-69=215	+5
T8	(United States) Ken Venturi	70-72-73=215	+5

=== Final round ===
Sunday, July 24, 1960

Place	Player	Score	To par	Money ($)
1	(United States) Jay Hebert	72-67-72-70=281	+1	11,000
2	(United States) Jim Ferrier	71-74-66-71=282	+2	5,500
T3	(United States) Doug Sanders	70-71-69-73=283	+3	3,350
T3	(United States) Sam Snead	68-73-70-72=283	+3	3,350
5	(United States) Don January	70-70-72-72=284	+4	2,800
6	(United States) Wes Ellis	72-72-72-69=285	+5	2,500
T7	(United States) Doug Ford	75-70-69-72=286	+6	2,125
T7	(United States) Arnold Palmer	67-74-75-70=286	+6	2,125
9	(United States) Ken Venturi	70-72-73-72=287	+7	1,900
T10	(United States) Fred Hawkins	73-69-72-74=288	+8	1,750
T10	(United States) Dave Marr	75-71-69-73=288	+8	1,750
