= 1975 PGA Championship =

Tournament information
- Dates: August 7–10, 1975
- Location: Akron, Ohio; 41.008°N 81.508°W
- Courses: Firestone Country Club; South Course
- Organized by: PGA of America
- Tour: PGA Tour

Statistics
- Par: 70
- Length: 7,180 yards (6,565 m)
- Field: 136 players, 71 after cut
- Cut: 148 (+8)
- Prize fund: $225,000
- Winner's share: $45,000

Champion
- (United States) Jack Nicklaus
- 276 (−4)
- Location in the United States Location in Ohio

The 1975 PGA Championship was the 57th PGA Championship, played August 7–10 at the South Course of Firestone Country Club in Akron, Ohio. Jack Nicklaus, an Ohio native, won the fourth of his five PGA Championships and the fourteenth of his eighteen major titles, two strokes ahead of runner-up Bruce Crampton. He was also the 54-hole leader, four strokes ahead of Crampton.

It was the second major of the year for Nicklaus, who won his fifth green jacket in April at the Masters, and the fourth of five times that he won two majors in the same calendar year.

Through 2025, this was the fourth and most recent time a player won the Masters and PGA Championship in the same calendar year. Nicklaus had previously won both in 1963, preceded by Jack Burke Jr. (1956) and Sam Snead (1949). Nicklaus also held both titles after a Masters win in 1972, and Tiger Woods held all four major titles after his Masters win in 2001.

This was the third PGA Championship at the South Course, which previously hosted in 1960 and 1966. It also a former venue for the WGC-Bridgestone Invitational, which began in 1976 as the "World Series of Golf" on the PGA Tour, preceded by the American Golf Classic, which debuted in 1961.

== Course layout ==
Hole	1	2	3	4	5	6	7	8	9	Out	10	11	12	13	14	15	16	17	18	In	Total
Yards	400	500	450	465	230	465	225	450	465	3,650	405	365	180	460	410	230	625	390	465	3,530	7,180
Par	4	5	4	4	3	4	3	4	4	35	4	4	3	4	4	3	5	4	4	35	70

== Round summaries ==
=== First round ===
Thursday, August 7, 1975

Place	Player	Score	To par
1	(United States) Mark Hayes	67	−3
T2	(United States) Bob Benson	68	−2
T2	(United States) Larry Hinson	68	−2
T4	(United States) Billy Casper	69	−1
T4	(United States) Ed Dougherty	69	−1
T4	(United States) Fred Wampler	69	−1
T4	(United States) Bob Wynn	69	−1
T8	(United States) Jim Dent	70	E
T8	(Australia) Bruce Devlin	70	E
T8	(United States) Raymond Floyd	70	E
T8	(United States) Al Geiberger	70	E
T8	(United States) Mike Morley	70	E
T8	(United States) Jack Nicklaus	70	E
T8	(United States) Art Wall Jr.	70	E
T8	(United States) Tom Watson	70	E
T8	(United States) Tom Weiskopf	70	E

=== Second round ===
Friday, August 8, 1975

Place	Player	Score	To par
1	(Australia) Bruce Crampton	71-63=134	−6
2	(United States) Hale Irwin	72-65=137	−3
T3	(United States) Jack Nicklaus	70-68=138	−2
T3	(United States) Mark Hayes	67-71=138	−2
T3	(United States) Bob Wynn	69-69=138	−2
T6	(United States) Ed Dougherty	69-70=139	−1
T6	(United States) John Schlee	71-68=139	−1
T8	(United States) Al Geiberger	70-70=140	E
T8	(United States) J. C. Snead	73-67=140	E
T8	(United States) Maurice VerBrugge	72-68=140	E

=== Third round ===
Saturday, August 9, 1975

Place	Player	Score	To par
1	(United States) Jack Nicklaus	70-68-67=205	−5
2	(Australia) Bruce Crampton	71-63-75=209	−1
3	(United States) Hale Irwin	72-65-73=210	E
T4	(United States) Ed Dougherty	69-70-72=211	+3
T4	(United States) Tom Weiskopf	70-71-70=211	+3
T6	(Australia) David Graham	72-70-70=212	+2
T6	(United States) Bob Murphy	75-68-69=212	+2
T6	(United States) Tom Watson	70-71-71=212	+2
T9	(United States) Billy Casper	69-72-72=213	+3
T9	(United States) Mark Hayes	67-71-75=213	+3
T9	(United States) Mike Hill	72-71-70=213	+3
T9	(United States) Larry Hinson	68-73-72=213	+3
T9	(United States) Don January	72-70-71=213	+3
T9	(United States) Gene Littler	76-71-66=213	+3

=== Final round ===
Sunday, August 10, 1975

Place	Player	Score	To par	Money ($)
1	(United States) Jack Nicklaus	70-68-67-71=276	−4	45,000
2	(Australia) Bruce Crampton	71-63-75-69=278	−2	25,700
3	(United States) Tom Weiskopf	70-71-70-68=279	−1	16,000
4	(United States) Andy North	72-74-70-65=281	+1	10,500
T5	(United States) Billy Casper	69-72-72-70=283	+3	8,663
T5	(United States) Hale Irwin	72-65-73-73=283	+3	8,663
T7	(United States) Dave Hill	71-71-74-68=284	+4	6,918
T7	(United States) Gene Littler	76-71-66-71=284	+4	6,918
9	(United States) Tom Watson	70-71-71-73=285	+5	6,075
T10	(United States) Buddy Allin	73-72-70-71=286	+6	4,468
T10	(United States) Ben Crenshaw	73-72-71-70=286	+6	4,468
T10	(United States) Raymond Floyd	70-73-72-71=286	+6	4,468
T10	(Australia) David Graham	72-70-70-74=286	+6	4,468
T10	(United States) Don January	72-70-71-73=286	+6	4,468
T10	(United States) John Schlee	71-68-75-72=286	+6	4,468
T10	(United States) Leonard Thompson	74-69-72-71=286	+6	4,468
