= Columbine Country Club =

Country club in Columbine Valley, Colorado, US

- Interactive map of Columbine Country Club
- 39.60°N 105.036°W

Club information
- Location: Columbine Valley, Colorado, U.S.
- Elevation: 5,350 feet (1,630 m) AMSL
- Established: 1955; 71 years ago
- Type: Private
- Total holes: 27
- Tournaments: PGA Championship (1967); Columbia Savings LPGA National Pro-Am (1977, 1980–83)
- Website: columbinecc.com

Championship Golf Course
- Designed by: Henry Hughes
- Par: 72
- Length: 7,427 yards (6,791 m)
- Course rating: 76.0
- Slope rating: 145

Championship Von Hagge (par 3)
- Designed by: von Hagge, Smelak, & Baril
- Par: 27

Columbine Country Club is a premier private country club, located in Columbine Valley, Colorado, a southern suburb minutes away from downtown Denver. Established in 1955, the club and property is home to an 18-hole championship course originally designed by Henry Hughes, a links-style 9-hole par three course designed by von Hagge, Smelak, & Baril, seven tennis courts, and a family pool complex. Columbine hosted the 49th edition of the PGA Championship in 1967, where Don January held off legends Arnold Palmer and Jack Nicklaus to win the major championship, defeating Don Massengale in an 18-hole Monday playoff.

In 2020, the par-72 golf course measured 7,427 yards (6,791 m) from the championship tees. In 2018, the club hired nationally recognized architect Rees Jones and co-designer Greg Muirhead to redesign and renovate the golf course. In 2017, Columbine Country Club completed a $20-million construction of its new 45,000-square-foot (4,200 m^{2}) clubhouse facilities.

== 1967 PGA Championship ==
The 1967 PGA Championship was the 49th edition of this major, staged by the PGA of America.

- Winner: Don January, 281
- Where it was played: Columbine Country Club in Columbine Valley, Colorado
- Tournament dates: July 20–24, 1967
- Leader after first round: Dave Hill, 66
- Leader after second round: Tommy Aaron, 135
- Leader after third round: Dan Sikes, 209

The second and last 18-hole playoff in a PGA Championship happened here. January and Don Massengale tied for the 72-hole lead at 281, one stroke better than Jack Nicklaus and third-round leader Dan Sikes. In the Monday playoff, January won by two strokes with a 69 for his only major title (he lost the 1961 PGA Championship in a playoff). The next playoff in the PGA Championship was ten years later in 1977.
