= Firestone Country Club =

Private golf club in Akron, OH, US

Coordinates: 41.008°N 81.508°W

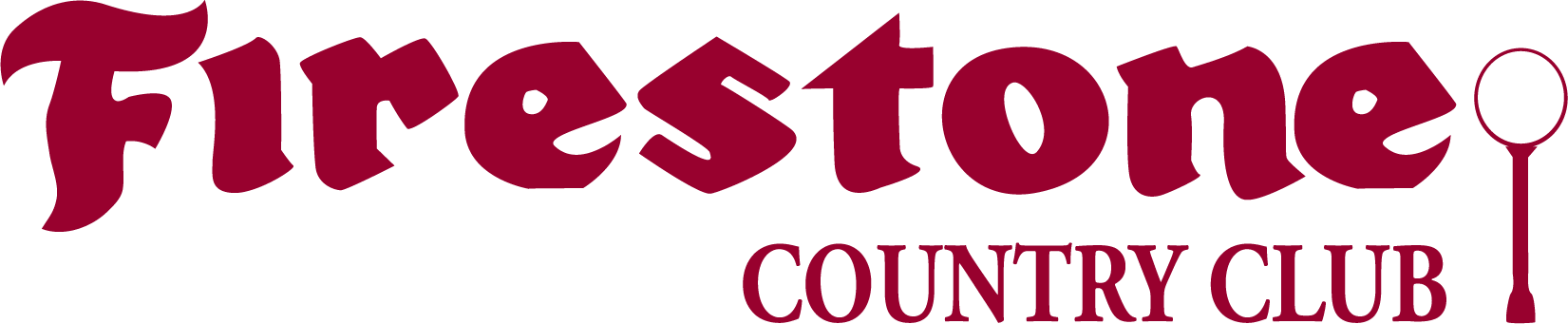

- Location within the United States Location within Ohio

Club information
- Location: Akron, Ohio
- Established: 1929; 97 years ago
- Type: Private
- Owner: ClubCorp
- Total holes: 54
- Tournaments: Senior Players Championship (2019–2026); NEC World Series of Golf (1962–1998); WGC-Bridgestone Invitational (1999–2001, 2003–2018); PGA Championship (1960, 1966, 1975); American Golf Classic (1961–1976); Rubber City Open Invitational (1954–1959)
- Greens: Pencross bentgrass / Poa annua
- Fairways: Pencross bentgrass / Poa annua
- Website: Official website

South
- Designed by: Bert Way (1929) redesigned in 1960 by Robert Trent Jones
- Par: 70
- Length: 7,400 yards (6,767 m)
- Course rating: 77.0
- Slope rating: 148

North
- Designed by: Robert Trent Jones (1969)
- Par: 72 (70 on 1994 NEC World Series of Golf)
- Length: 7,125 yards (6,515 m) (6,918 yards (6,326 m) on 1994 NEC World Series of Golf)
- Course rating: 74.2
- Slope rating: 139

Fazio
- Designed by: Tom Fazio (1989)
- Par: 70
- Length: 6,904 yards (6,313 m)
- Course rating: 73.5
- Slope rating: 128
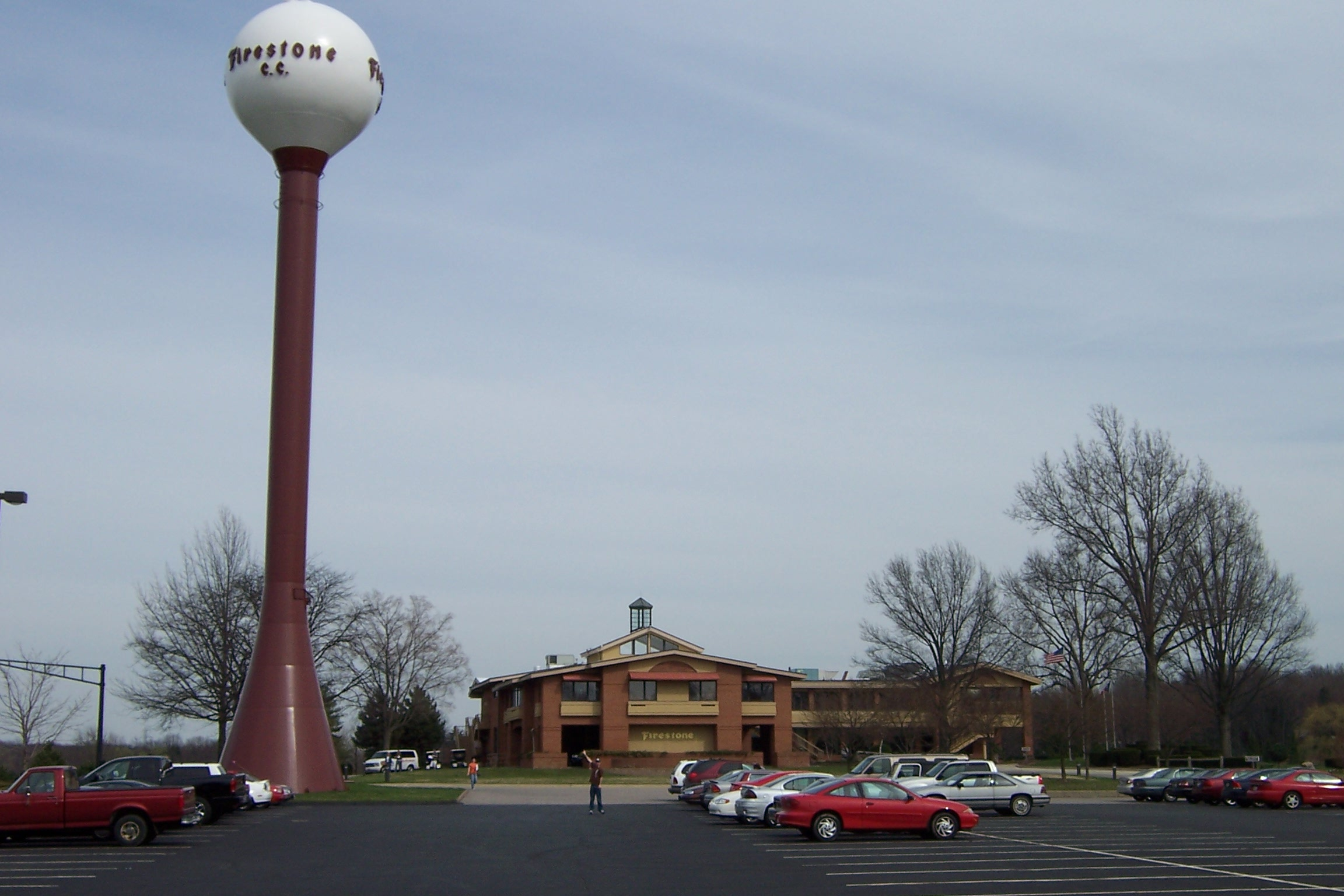
- The Firestone Country Club clubhouse in 2006.

Firestone Country Club is a private golf club in the United States, located in Akron, Ohio. It was a regular stop on the PGA Tour and has hosted the PGA Championship three times. It is the current home of the Kaulig Companies Championship through 2026.

The club comprises three courses–those of the North, South, and Fazio. In 1974 the club hosted three televised golf events: the American Golf Classic, the CBS Golf Classic and the World Series of Golf. No other club has hosted three televised golf events in the same calendar year.

One of four World Golf Championships constituent events, the WGC-Bridgestone Invitational, directed by the International Federation of PGA Tours and sanctioned on the PGA and European Tours, was contested at the club with the final event at the club held in 2018. The North and West courses also serve as the home course for the University of Akron Zips golf team.

== History ==
Harvey S. Firestone commissioned the club 97 years ago in 1929 as a park for employees of the Firestone Tire and Rubber Company. Its first course, the South, was designed by Bert Way and opened on August 10, 1929, with Firestone driving the first ball. For the sixth and final Rubber City Open Invitational in 1959, the course was 6,620 yards (6,053 m) at par 71.

A major redesign by Robert Trent Jones in 1960 for the PGA Championship added over fifty bunkers and two ponds, and extended the course to 7,165 yards (6,552 m) at par 70. The course was renovated by Golforce in 2007 and played at 7,400 yards (6,767 m) for the WGC event in 2015.

The North Course was designed by Jones and opened 57 years ago in 1969. Firestone's West was the last course to be added, opening in 1989. First conceived by Geoffrey Cornish and Brian Silva, it went through a redesign in 2002 by Tom Fazio. It would later be renamed The Fazio Course.

Firestone Country Club was acquired by ClubCorp 45 years ago in 1981, purchased from the Firestone family.

A driving range was added in 1994 and was the first area of the club open to the public. A nine–hole course, the Raymond C. Firestone, was opened for public play in 1995.

Before the Firestone Country Club would officially host golf tournaments, the Firestone Clubhouse building that's located within the country club also hosted the Akron Firestone Non-Skids basketball team that competed in the National Professional Basketball League in its inaugural 1932–33 season, the Midwest Basketball Conference from 1935 until 1937, and the National Basketball League as a professional basketball team from 1937 until 1941. The Clubhouse would host the 1933 NPBL championship series match-up where the Firestone Non-Skids would sweep the Toledo Crimson Coaches 3-0, as well as host the 1939 and 1940 NBL Finals championship series match-ups, which ended with them winning both championships with a 3-2 series win over the Oshkosh All-Stars.

== Tournaments ==
The Rubber City Open was the first tournament held at Firestone, from 1954 through 1959. The PGA Championship has been held at the South Course three times: 1960, 1966, and 1975. This exposure led to a new event, the American Golf Classic, which ran from 1961 through 1976.

Since 1962, the World Series of Golf, now known as the WGC-Bridgestone Invitational, has been held at Firestone, usually on the South course. An unofficial four–man event over 36 holes through 1975, it became a limited field event over 72 holes in 1976.

During the third round of the PGA Championship in 1975, Jack Nicklaus pulled out a remarkable par on the 625-yard (572 m) 16th hole, considered to be the hardest hole on Firestone's courses. Trailing Bruce Crampton by four strokes after two rounds, Nicklaus gained eight shots on Saturday to lead by four after 54 holes and won his fourth PGA Championship. Tiger Woods also had a memorable moment on the South course when his "shot in the dark" on the 72nd hole at the WGC event in 2000 ensured victory by eleven strokes. He had won the PGA Championship the previous week for his third consecutive major championship that season.

The North course is used less frequently in televised events, but hosted the American Golf Classic in 1976 and the World Series of Golf in 1994.

Starting in 2023, Firestone Country Club's South Course has been host to the Kaulig Companies Championship.

== Holes ==
=== South Course – The Monster ===
This course was designed from the start to be championship level and has been the host of over 70 professional tournaments. After a triple–bogey at the 16th hole in the third round of the PGA Championship in 1960, Arnold Palmer called it a "monster." The name stayed and struck such a chord with frustrated golfers that the entire South course is now known fondly as "The Monster."

Tee	Rating/Slope	1	2	3	4	5	6	7	8	9	Out	10	11	12	13	14	15	16	17	18	In	Total
Blue	M:77.0 / 148	399	526	442	471	200	469	219	482	494	3,702	410	418	180	471	467	221	667	400	464	3,698	7,400
White	M:72.2 / 143 W:78.4 / 149	372	478	369	366	182	413	147	420	442	3,189	387	345	165	439	371	159	590	374	435	3,265	6,454
Green	M:69.3 / 134 W:75.4 / 140	372	478	323	366	171	413	147	420	330	3,020	336	345	153	355	371	148	465	333	350	2,856	5,876
Silver	M:65.9 / 121 W:71.3 / 132	275	395	323	270	171	275	138	296	330	2,473	336	255	153	355	287	148	465	333	350	2,682	5,155
Par		4	5	4	4	3	4	3	4	4	35	4	4	3	4	4	3	5	4	4	35	70
SI		9	13	15	7	11	1	17	5	3		6	16	10	2	14	18	12	8	4

- 4th Hole : Another long par 4, the second shot is where golfers get themselves into trouble; the height of the green requires quite a bit of lift.
- 5th Hole : While still a good length, this par 3 is considered to be one of the easier holes on the course. However, until 1987 NEC World Series of Golf, the full length from championship tee was 234 yards, which was the longest and toughest par 3 in this course.
- 6th Hole : Length alone adds a great deal of difficulty to this par 4, often noted to be the most difficult hole on the course.
- 15th Hole : A long par 3 is difficult enough, but the hidden left bunker proves fatal for many a golfer.
- 16th Hole : One of the longest par 5s in existence, its pond in front of the green adds more than its fair share of difficulty to the hole.
- 18th Hole : With a long narrow profile and a green surrounded by bunkers, this is a difficult par 4 to birdie.

=== North Course ===
A championship-level course, the North is famous for its many lakes and streams. While considered the most scenic course of the three, it has only been host to two tournaments. The 1994 NEC World Series of Golf was the one of them, and the course yardage were below;

Tee	Rating/Slope	1	2	3	4	5	6	7	8	9	Out	10	11	12	13	14	15	16	17	18	In	Total
1994 NEC World Series of Golf		398	387	449	423	475	214	534	178	431	3,489	364	201	427	441	441	341	560	184	470	3,429	6,918
Par		4	4	4	4	4	3	5	3	4	35	4	3	4	4	4	4	5	3	4	35	70

- Scorecard

Tee	Rating/Slope	1	2	3	4	5	6	7	8	9	Out	10	11	12	13	14	15	16	17	18	In	Total
Gold	M:74.2 / 139	398	387	449	423	533	214	534	178	431	3,547	364	201	452	441	441	356	560	218	545	3,578	7,125
Blue	M:72.9 / 139	378	360	430	405	515	179	513	161	416	3,357	352	183	436	416	420	341	536	180	520	3,384	6,741
White	M:71.1 / 133 W:76.9 / 145	367	342	403	389	504	147	492	145	401	3,190	334	162	415	394	405	327	524	146	491	3,198	6,388
Par		4	4	4	4	5	3	5	3	4	36	4	3	4	4	4	4	5	3	5	36	72
Silver	M:67.2 / 125 W:72.3 / 134	343	265	380	363	451	127	447	116	388	2,880	308	104	405	380	320	278	492	103	319	2,709	5,589
Par	Men's Women's	4	4	4	4	5	3	5	3	4	36	4	3	4 5	4	4	4	5	3	5 4	36	72
SI	Men's	5	11	3	7	13	9	17	15	1		16	10	2	6	4	18	8	12	14
SI	Women's	9	13	11	7	1	15	5	17	3		12	16	8	6	10	14	2	18	4

- 7th Hole : Water comes into play if approach shot is hit too long.
- 11th Hole : Almost an island green with water surrounding 3 sides of the green. Dave Rababy is the latest to record a Hole in One in August 2026.
- 16th Hole : Water comes into play if approach shot is hit too long.
- 17th Hole : Another hole with water surrounding 3 sides of the green.

=== Fazio Course ===
The final championship course on the grounds and host to the annual Ohio Senior Open.

- 1st Hole, 444 yard, par–4
- 2nd Hole, 392 yard, par–4
- 3rd Hole, 211 yard, par–3
- 4th Hole, 324 yard, par–4
- 5th Hole, 356 yard, par–4
- 6th Hole, 467 yard, par–4
- 7th Hole, 191 yard, par–3
- 8th Hole, 484 yard, par–4
- 9th Hole, 625 yard, par–5
- 10th Hole, 426 yard, par–4
- 11th Hole, 448 yard, par–4
- 12th Hole, 170 yard, par–3
- 13th Hole, 492 yard, par–5
- 14th Hole, 147 yard, par–3
- 15th Hole, 476 yard, par–4
- 16th Hole, 244 yard, par–3
- 17th Hole, 525 yard, par–5
- 18th Hole, 482 yard, par–4
