= 1984 Senior PGA Tour =

Golf tour season

1984 Senior PGA Tour season
- Duration: January 2, 1984 – December 9, 1984
- Number of official events: 22
- Most wins: (United States) Miller Barber (4)
- Money list: (United States) Don January

The 1984 Senior PGA Tour was the fifth season of the Senior PGA Tour, the main professional golf tour in the United States for men aged 50 and over.

== Schedule ==
The following table lists official events during the 1984 season.

Date	Tournament	Location	Purse (US$)	Winner (Note: The number in parentheses after each winner's name is the number of Senior PGA Tour events they had won up to and including that tournament. This information is only shown for Senior PGA Tour members.)	Notes
Jan 8	Seiko-Tucson Senior Match Play Championship	Arizona	306,000	(United States) Gene Littler (3)	New tournament
Jan 22	PGA Seniors' Championship	Florida	200,000	(United States) Arnold Palmer (6)	Senior major championship
Mar 25	Vintage Invitational	California	300,000	(United States) Don January (12)	New to Senior PGA Tour
Apr 8	Daytona Beach Seniors Golf Classic	Florida	150,000	(United States) Orville Moody (1)	
Apr 22	Senior PGA Tour Roundup	Arizona	200,000	(United States) Billy Casper (4)	New tournament
May 6	MONY Senior Tournament of Champions	California	100,000	(United States) Orville Moody (2)	New tournament
Jun 3	Gatlin Brothers Seniors Golf Classic	Nevada	220,000	(United States) Dan Sikes (2)	
Jun 17	Roy Clark Senior Challenge	Oklahoma	200,000	(United States) Miller Barber (11)	New tournament
Jun 24	Senior Tournament Players Championship	Ohio	240,000	(United States) Arnold Palmer (7)	Senior PGA Tour major championship
Jul 1	U.S. Senior Open	New York	200,000	(United States) Miller Barber (12)	Senior major championship
Jul 8	Greater Syracuse Senior's Pro Classic	New York	200,000	(United States) Miller Barber (13)	
Jul 15	Merrill Lynch/Golf Digest Commemorative Pro-Am	Rhode Island	150,000	(Argentina) Roberto De Vicenzo (2)	Pro-Am
Jul 29	Denver Post Champions of Golf	Colorado	200,000	(United States) Miller Barber (14)	
Aug 12	du Maurier Champions	Canada	225,000	(United States) Don January (13)	
Sep 3	Citizens Union Senior Golf Classic	Kentucky	175,000	(United States) Gay Brewer (1)	
Sep 9	United Virginia Bank Seniors	Virginia	200,000	(United States) Dan Sikes (3)	
Sep 16	World Seniors Invitational	North Carolina	150,000	(Australia) Peter Thomson (1)	
Sep 23	Digital Middlesex Classic	Massachusetts	175,000	(United States) Don January (14)	
Oct 14	Suntree Senior Classic	Florida	150,000	(United States) Lee Elder (1)	
Oct 21	Hilton Head Seniors International	South Carolina	200,000	(United States) Lee Elder (2)	
Dec 2	Quadel Seniors Classic	Florida	200,000	(United States) Arnold Palmer (8)	
Dec 9	General Foods PGA Seniors' Championship	Florida	225,000	(Australia) Peter Thomson (2)	Senior major championship, 1985 season senior major.

== Money list ==
The money list was based on prize money won during the season, calculated in U.S. dollars.

Position	Player	Prize money ($)
1	(United States) Don January	328,597
2	(United States) Miller Barber	299,099
3	(Australia) Peter Thomson	228,940
4	(United States) Arnold Palmer	184,582
5	(United States) Orville Moody	183,920

== Awards ==
Award	Winner	Ref.
Scoring leader (Byron Nelson Award)	(United States) Don January	
