= Latrobe Country Club =

Golf club near Latrobe, Pennsylvania, United States

Coordinates: 40°16′33″N 79°22′20″W

Arnold Palmer's Latrobe Country Club is a private golf club located near Latrobe, Pennsylvania. The course is where Arnold Palmer learned to play the game of golf from his father. The grounds are located in Unity Township in Westmoreland County, south of Latrobe, and nearer Youngstown.

== History ==
Latrobe Country Club was founded in 1920 by a group of leading industrialists, bankers and professionals from Latrobe, Pennsylvania. The group had acquired 63 acres (25 hectares) of the Kennan Farm bordering on what was then the National Lincoln Highway (U.S. Route 30) just west of Youngstown. By the summer of 1921, work was well underway on the golf course and clubhouse. Among those on the job was a teenager named Milford (Deacon "Deke") Palmer, Arnold Palmer's father.

From that hilly plot of ground emerged a short but imaginative nine-hole course. Despite tough economic times, the club made steady progress over the next two decades. Additional tracts of land were purchased, allowing for revisions that greatly improved the course. In 1944, the Unity Land Company was created and became owner of the property and financed further expansion of the clubhouse and other facilities.

By the early 1960s, sufficient land had been acquired to enable plans for an 18-hole course. Both Deacon and Arnold Palmer contributed heavily to the design of the nine new holes and the revamping of the existing holes to fit the layout. Construction began in 1963 and the new course opened for play the following season. The then 6,377-yard, par-72 course has matured into a beautiful and demanding test of golf.

Course improvement and the modernization and expansion of the clubhouse was accelerated when Arnold Palmer purchased the club in 1971. The interior of the clubhouse was redesigned. Tennis courts, maintenance buildings and cart storage areas were all constructed. Over the years, many of the holes have been revised and lengthened, a modern irrigation system was installed, permanent cart paths were added and a practice range was created.

Deacon Palmer, who had become the grounds superintendent in 1926 and the golf professional in 1931, remained active until his death at the age of 71 in February 1976.

== Covered bridges ==
When Arnold Palmer was designing the back nine at Latrobe Country Club, he wanted to create something that was innovative, yet reflective of western Pennsylvania's rich culture and traditions. He found his inspiration in a watery hazard. A picturesque creek cuts comes into play on several challenging holes on the back nine. So instead of building utilitarian rain shelters on this part of the course, Palmer decided to construct covered bridges that could provide protection when storms kicked up. These beautiful, red, covered bridges are so popular that artists and photographers from across the United States now come to Latrobe just to capture their image.

== Tree carving ==
When Latrobe Country Club was founded in 1921, the golf course was built on farmland. It's hard to imagine today, but back then there were very few trees on this relatively open parcel of land. So, Deacon Palmer embarked on a massive tree planting campaign. About 75 percent of the trees found on the course today were planted by Deacon. One of them, a red pine between the first and eighteenth hole, died recently and was in the process of being cut down. Arnold Palmer suggested that the stump be left and converted into a giant carving of his father. His brother, Jerry, hired renowned local woodcarver Joe King to transform the 12-foot (3.7 m) red pine into a sentimental tribute to their father.
