= Arnold Palmer Tournament Golf =

1989 golf video game

Arnold Palmer Tournament Golf!
- Developer: Sega
- Publisher: Sega
- Composer: Tokuhiko Uwabo
- Platform: Genesis
- Release: JP: September 9, 1989; NA: October 1989; PAL: January 1991
- Genre: Sports
- Modes: Single-player, Multiplayer

Arnold Palmer Tournament Golf (JP: Ozaki Naomichi no Super Masters (尾崎直道のスーパーマスターズ, Ozaki Naomichi no Super Masters) is a golf video game for the Sega Mega Drive/Genesis.

Although Arnold Palmer appears on the box cover and title screen, he is not referenced in the game itself. Palmer's name was only added in the localised release, a practice common among early Sega sports titles (other games in this vein include Tommy Lasorda Baseball and Pat Riley Basketball). The original Japanese release bore the name of Japanese golfer Naomichi Ozaki.

== Gameplay ==
The player must be aware of the wind conditions in addition to the amount of strength that is applied to the golf clubs while swinging.

The game features two game play modes: tournament and practice. Tournament mode consists of 12 rounds, each with 18 holes of golf. There are three different golf courses, one each in the United States, Japan, and Great Britain (though the scenery and the background does not vary). As the player progresses in the tournament mode, their skill level is increased allowing them to hit the ball further with greater control. They can also upgrade their golf clubs from the initial black carbon club set, to glass fiber and ceramic clubs. This also increases the distance the player is able to hit the ball. Arnold Palmer Tournament Golf has no save feature, but instead provides a password after each round of the tournament that allows the player to pick up where they left off.

In practice mode, one or two players can play a complete 18 rounds of golf on one of the three courses. Each player can set their skill level and use any of the three golf club sets available in the game.

Before each turn, the player's caddy will give advice based on its skill level. At first, the caddy can only give the distance from the ball's current position to the tee. As the game progresses, more skilled caddies can give distances to various landmarks and information about how the ball is lying. The player then selects which club to use during the shot. After this, the player can adjust their golfer's stance in order to put a draw or fade on the ball (all golfers in the game are right-handed).

To control the swing, the player uses a power gauge to select the strength and height of the shot. When the player first presses the shot button, a marker starts to move upwards to the top of the gauge. If the player hits the shot button again before it reaches the top (this controls how hard the shot will be), the marker will then move back down towards the starting position. The player then must hit the button a third time inside of a green area on the power gauge (this controls how high the shot will go in the air). If the player fails to hit the shot button a third time, the sequence will start over from the beginning.

When the ball reaches the putting green, a close-up of the screen will appear. The game will first show the distance from the ball to the tee, and then show a simple diagram of the lie on the green. The player will then be able to select how hard to hit the ball and in what direction.

== Connections to Sega franchises ==
Pressing the start button allows the music to be changed and also whether a cheer from the gallery or not upon completing a hole is heard. Opa-Opa, the player-character from the Fantasy Zone series, is the cursor in the pause menu. Also, a trick allows the player to play a secret Fantasy Zone level by hitting the ball 100 times on the first hole of any course without holing out, then entering up, up, down, down, left, right, left, right, B, and A on the game over screen. The special level freezes after a certain number of enemies have been killed, but it is impossible to return to the golf game without resetting the system. In addition, Alex Kidd makes appearances in the Tournament Mode after nine holes have been played in each round (called "Coffee Breaks").
