= Don Massengale =

American golfer (1937–2007)

Personal information
- Full name: Donald Ray Massengale Sr.
- Nickname: Bugs Bunny
- Nationality: United States
- Born: April 23, 1937 Jacksboro, Texas, U.S.
- Died: January 2, 2007 (aged 69) Conroe, Texas, U.S.
- Height: 6 ft 1 in (1.85 m)
- Weight: 195 lb (88 kg; 13.9 st)

Career
- Sport: Golf
- College: Texas Christian University
- Turned professional: 1960
- Former tours: PGA Tour; Champions Tour
- Professional wins: 8

Number of wins by tour
- PGA Tour: 2
- PGA Tour Champions: 2
- Other: 4

Best results in major championships
- Masters Tournament: T45: 1968
- PGA Championship: 2nd: 1967
- U.S. Open: T15: 1972
- The Open Championship: DNP

Donald Ray Massengale Sr. (April 23, 1937 – January 2, 2007) was an American professional golfer who won tournaments on both the PGA Tour and the Senior PGA Tour.

== Early life and amateur career ==
Massengale was born in Jacksboro, Texas. He had a younger brother, Rik, who played 13 years on the PGA Tour.

Massengale won the 1958 Texas Amateur Championship. He played collegiately at Texas Christian University.

== Professional career ==
In 1960, Massengale turned pro. His two wins on the PGA Tour came in 1966 and he finished that year 26th on the money list. He finished among the top-60 money winners on the PGA Tour in 1962, 1966 and 1967. His best finish in a major was a 2nd at the 1967 PGA Championship where he lost to Don January in an 18-hole playoff (69-71).

Massengale worked as a club pro in the Houston area in his 40s – between his PGA Tour and Senior PGA Tour careers. He won twice on the Senior PGA Tour the 1990 Greater Grand Rapids Open and the 1992 Royal Caribbean Classic.

== Personal life ==
Massengale and wife Judy had two sons: Donnie and Mark. Both of them are golf teaching professionals.

Massengale died of a heart attack in Conroe, Texas.

== Amateur wins ==
- 1958 Texas Amateur Championship

== Professional wins (8) ==
=== PGA Tour wins (2) ===
No.	Date	Tournament	Winning score	Margin of victory	Runner-up
1	Jan 23, 1966	Bing Crosby National Pro-Am	−5 (70-67-76-70=283)	1 stroke	(United States) Arnold Palmer
2	Oct 2, 1966	Canadian Open	−4 (70-70-70-70=280)	3 strokes	(United States) Chi-Chi Rodríguez

PGA Tour playoff record (0–1)

No.	Year	Tournament	Opponent	Result
1	1967	PGA Championship	(United States) Don January	Lost 18-hole playoff; January: −3 (69), Massengale: −1 (71)

=== Other wins (4) ===
- 1972 PGA Club Professional Championship, Westchester Open, Metropolitan Open
- 1975 Southern Texas PGA Championship

=== Senior PGA Tour wins (2) ===
No.	Date	Tournament	Winning score	Margin of victory	Runner(s)-up
1	Sep 16, 1990	Greater Grand Rapids Open	−8 (69-65=134) (Note: Shortened to 36 holes due to weather.)	1 stroke	(United States) Terry Dill, (United States) Dave Hill, (United States) Larry Laoretti
2	Feb 2, 1992	Royal Caribbean Classic	−8 (70-70-65=205)	1 stroke	(South Africa) Gary Player

Senior PGA Tour playoff record (0–1)

No.	Year	Tournament	Opponents	Result
1	1988	Senior Players Reunion Pro-Am	(New Zealand) Bob Charles, (United States) Orville Moody, (United States) Bobby Nichols	Moody won with birdie on first extra hole

== Results in major championships ==
Tournament	1965	1966	1967	1968	1969
Masters Tournament			T49	T45	
U.S. Open	CUT	T36			CUT
PGA Championship		T28	2	CUT	

Tournament	1970	1971	1972	1973	1974	1975	1976	1977	1978	1979
Masters Tournament				55						
U.S. Open			T15	CUT						
PGA Championship				CUT	T24	CUT	T22			

Tournament	1980	1981	1982
Masters Tournament			
U.S. Open			
PGA Championship			CUT

Note: Massengale never played in The Open Championship.

Top 10
Did not play

CUT = missed the half-way cut
"T" indicates a tie for a place

== U.S. national team appearances ==
- Diamondhead Cup/PGA Cup: 1973 (winners), 1982 (winners)
