= Rubber City Open Invitational =

Golf tournament formerly on the PGA Tour

Coordinates: 41.008°N 81.508°W

Tournament information
- Location: Akron, Ohio
- Established: 1954
- Courses: Firestone Country Club (South Course)
- Par: 71
- Length: 6,620 yards (6,050 m)
- Tour: PGA Tour
- Format: Stroke play
- Prize fund: US$20,000
- Month played: August
- Final year: 1959

Tournament record score
- Aggregate: 265 Tommy Bolt (1954)
- To par: −23 as above

Final champion
- (United States) Tom Nieporte
- Location in the United States Location in Ohio

The Rubber City Open Invitational, first played as the Rubber City Open in 1954, was the first PGA Tour golf event to be held at Firestone Country Club in Akron, Ohio, US. The tournament, last played in 1959, was discontinued as Firestone gained national prominence and attracted bigger events beginning with hosting the 1960 PGA Championship, the American Golf Classic in 1961, and in 1962, the World Series of Golf now known as the WGC-Bridgestone Invitational, was hosted.

The first edition in September 1954 had a $15,000 purse with a winner's share of $2,400, won by Tommy Bolt. The sixth and final champion in August 1959 was Tom Nieporte, who won $2,800 from a $20,000 purse.

At the time, there were only 18 holes at Firestone, today's "South Course." The North Course was the second course, added in 1969.

== Winners ==
Year	Winner	Score	To par	Margin of victory	Runner(s)-up	Winner's share ($)	Ref.
Rubber City Open Invitational
1959	(United States) Tom Nieporte	267	−13	3 strokes	(United States) Bob Goalby	2,800	
1958	(United States) Art Wall Jr.	269	−15	Playoff	(United States) Dow Finsterwald	2,800	
1957	(United States) Arnold Palmer	272	−12	Playoff	(United States) Doug Ford	2,800	
Rubber City Open
1956	(United States) Ed Furgol	271	−17	1 stroke	(United States) Arnold Palmer	3,000	
1955	(United States) Henry Ransom	272	−16	Playoff	(United States) Jackson Bradley (United States) Jack Burke Jr. (United States) Doug Ford	2,400	
1954	(United States) Tommy Bolt	265	−23	5 strokes	(United States) Fred Hawkins	2,400	
