= Quadel Seniors Classic =

The Quadel Seniors Classic was a golf tournament on the Champions Tour from 1983 to 1985. It was played in Boca Raton, Florida at the Boca Grove Plantation.

The purse for the 1985 tournament was US$200,000, with $30,000 going to the winner. The tournament was founded in 1983 as the Boca Grove Seniors Classic.

== Winners ==
Quadel Seniors Classic

- 1985 Gary Player
- 1984 Arnold Palmer

Boca Grove Seniors Classic

- 1983 Arnold Palmer
