= Dudley Wysong =

American professional golfer (1939–1998)

Personal information
- Full name: Henry Dudley Wysong, Jr.
- Nationality: United States
- Born: May 15, 1939 McKinney, Texas, U.S.
- Died: March 29, 1998 (aged 58) Plano, Texas, U.S.

Career
- Sport: Golf
- Turned professional: 1963
- Former tours: PGA Tour; Champions Tour
- Professional wins: 3

Number of wins by tour
- PGA Tour: 2
- Other: 1

Best results in major championships
- Masters Tournament: T39: 1966
- PGA Championship: 2nd: 1966
- U.S. Open: T8: 1965
- The Open Championship: DNP

Henry Dudley Wysong, Jr. (May 15, 1939 – March 29, 1998) was an American professional golfer.

== Early life and amateur career ==
Wysong was born, raised and lived all his life in and around McKinney, Texas. One of the people who taught Wysong how to play golf was Byron Nelson. In 1961, Wysong lost the final round (match play) of the U.S. Amateur, 8 and 6, to Jack Nicklaus at Pebble Beach.

== Professional career ==
Wysong won two events on the PGA Tour: the 1966 Phoenix Open Invitational and the 1967 Hawaiian Open. His best finish in a major was a 2nd at the 1966 PGA Championship, which was won by Al Geiberger. Wysong also finished T-8 at the 1965 U.S. Open.

Wysong later served as vice president of the PGA of America.

== Death ==
Wysong died in Plano, Texas after suffering an aneurysm at the McKinney Country Club where he was the golf pro for many years.

== Professional wins (3) ==
=== PGA Tour wins (2) ===
No.	Date	Tournament	Winning score	Margin of victory	Runner-up
1	Feb 14, 1966	Phoenix Open Invitational	−6 (73-69-70-66=278)	1 stroke	(United States) Gardner Dickinson
2	Nov 4, 1967	Hawaiian Open	−4 (72-69-70-73=284)	Playoff	(United States) Billy Casper

PGA Tour playoff record (1–1)

No.	Year	Tournament	Opponent	Result
1	1965	Cajun Classic Open Invitational	(United States) Babe Hiskey	Lost to birdie on second extra hole
2	1967	Hawaiian Open	(United States) Billy Casper	Won with par on first extra hole

=== Other wins (1) ===
- 1964 Tri-State Open

== Results in major championships ==
Tournament	1960	1961	1962	1963	1964	1965	1966	1967	1968	1969	1970
Masters Tournament	CUT		CUT				T39	CUT			
U.S. Open					T23	T8	CUT				CUT
PGA Championship							2	T34		T48	

Note: Wysong never played in The Open Championship.

Top 10
Did not play

CUT = missed the half-way cut
"T" = tied

== U.S. national team appearances ==
Amateur

- Americas Cup: 1961 (winners)
