= Bob Wynn =

American professional golfer (1940–2005)

Personal information
- Full name: Robert L. Wynn
- Nationality: United States
- Born: January 27, 1940 Lancaster, Kentucky, U.S.
- Died: May 18, 2005 (aged 65) Loma Linda, California, U.S.

Career
- Sport: Golf
- Turned professional: 1966
- Former tours: PGA Tour; Champions Tour
- Professional wins: 8

Number of wins by tour
- PGA Tour: 1
- PGA Tour Champions: 1
- Other: 6

Best results in major championships
- Masters Tournament: T24: 1977
- PGA Championship: T28: 1975
- U.S. Open: DNP
- The Open Championship: DNP

Robert L. Wynn (January 27, 1940 – May 18, 2005) was an American professional golfer who played on the PGA Tour and the Champions Tour.

== Early life ==
Wynn was born in Lancaster, Kentucky.

== Professional career ==
In 1966, Wynn turned pro. His victory at the 1976 B.C. Open was his only career win in a PGA Tour event. Wynn's final-round of 69 was enough to give him a one-stroke victory over Bob Gilder in that tournament. He had 17 career top-10 finishes in PGA Tour events. His best finish in a major championship was T24 at The Masters in 1977.

After reaching the age of 50 in 1990, Wynn joined the Senior PGA Tour, where had one career win, the 1993 NYNEX Commemorative. In 1997, he earned $177,874, and finished 2nd in the BankBoston Classic. He last played competitively in 2002, and ended with 12 top-10 finishes in Senior PGA Tour events.

== Personal life ==
Wynn lived in La Quinta, California and died in Loma Linda, California from lung cancer.

== Professional wins (8) ==
=== PGA Tour wins (1) ===
No.	Date	Tournament	Winning score	Margin of victory	Runner-up
1	Aug 8, 1976	B.C. Open	−13 (65-71-66-69=271)	1 stroke	(United States) Bob Gilder

=== Other wins (6) ===
- 1970 Ohio Open
- 1971 Ohio Open
- 1972 Ohio Open
- 1975 Magnolia State Classic
- 1978 Belgian Omnium
- 1983 Northern California PGA Championship

=== Senior PGA Tour wins (1) ===
No.	Date	Tournament	Winning score	Margin of victory	Runners-up
1	Jun 6, 1993	NYNEX Commemorative	−7 (69-68-66=203)	1 stroke	(New Zealand) Bob Charles, (United States) Larry Gilbert, (United States) Chi-Chi Rodríguez

== U.S. national team appearances ==
- PGA Cup: 1984
