= American Golf Classic =

Golf tournament formerly on the PGA Tour

Tournament information
- Location: Akron, Ohio
- Established: 1961
- Courses: Firestone Country Club (North Course)
- Par: 72
- Length: 7,105 yards (6,497 m)
- Tour: PGA Tour
- Format: Stroke play
- Prize fund: US$200,000
- Month played: August
- Final year: 1976

Tournament record score
- Aggregate: 268 Raymond Floyd (1969)
- To par: −14 David Graham (1976)

Final champion
- (Australia) David Graham
- Location in the United States Location in Ohio

The American Golf Classic was a tournament on the PGA Tour from 1961 to 1976 at Firestone Country Club in Akron, Ohio. It was the third event at the storied South course, after the Rubber City Open Invitational (1954–1959) and the PGA Championship in 1960.

The final edition in 1976 was played on the North course, with the World Series of Golf held the following week on the South course. The World Series of Golf was succeeded by the current WGC-Bridgestone Invitational, held on the South course.

== Tournament highlights ==
- 1961: Jay Hebert wins the inaugural version of the tournament by defeating Gary Player on the second hole of a sudden death playoff. To get in the playoff, Hebert had to make a 20-foot birdie putt on the 72nd hole.
- 1963: Johnny Pott leads the second AGC wire to wire. He wins by four shots over Arnold Palmer.
- 1964: Ken Venturi makes the AGC his third triumph for 1964. He finishes five shots ahead of Mason Rudolph.
- 1965: Al Geiberger wins for the 3rd time ever on the PGA Tour. He finishes four shots ahead of Arnold Palmer. One year later, Geiberger would also win the PGA Championship at the Firestone Country Club.
- 1967: Arnold Palmer becomes the first and only multiple winner of the AGC. He finishes three shots ahead of Doug Sanders.
- 1968: Jack Nicklaus wins in a sudden death playoff over Lee Elder and Frank Beard. Elder, a tour rookie at the time, matched Nicklaus shot for shot for four extra holes before losing on the fifth. The finish of the 1968 American Golf Classic has been called one of the most exciting in televised golf history.
- 1969: Raymond Floyd shoots a final round 65 to win by four shots over Bobby Nichols.
- 1973: Bruce Crampton wins by three shots over Lanny Wadkins, Gay Brewer, and Bob Murphy. It is Crampton's 4th win of the year and at the time vaults him to #1 on the money list for the year.
- 1974: Jim Colbert wins the AGC in a four-way playoff. He defeats Raymond Floyd, Gay Brewer, and Forrest Fezler.
- 1976: David Graham wins the last edition of the tournament, the only one played on the North course. He finished four shots ahead of Lou Graham.

== Winners ==
Year	Winner	Score	To par	Margin of victory	Runner(s)-up
1976	(Australia) David Graham	274	−14	4 strokes	(United States) Lou Graham
1975: No tournament
1974	(United States) Jim Colbert	281	+1	Playoff	(United States) Gay Brewer (United States) Forrest Fezler (United States) Raymond Floyd
1973	(Australia) Bruce Crampton	273	−7	3 strokes	(United States) Gay Brewer (United States) Bob Murphy (United States) Lanny Wadkins
1972	(United States) Bert Yancey	276	−4	Playoff	(United States) Tom Ulozas
1971	(United States) Jerry Heard	275	−5	3 strokes	(United States) Dale Douglass
1970	(United States) Frank Beard	276	−4	2 strokes	(United States) Tommy Aaron (Australia) Bruce Crampton (United States) Jack Nicklaus
1969	(United States) Raymond Floyd	268	−12	4 strokes	(United States) Bobby Nichols
1968	(United States) Jack Nicklaus	280	E	Playoff	(United States) Frank Beard (United States) Lee Elder
1967	(United States) Arnold Palmer (2)	276	−4	3 strokes	(United States) Doug Sanders
1966: No tournament
1965	(United States) Al Geiberger	280	E	4 strokes	(United States) Arnold Palmer
1964	(United States) Ken Venturi	275	−5	5 strokes	(United States) Mason Rudolph
1963	(United States) Johnny Pott	276	−4	4 strokes	(United States) Arnold Palmer
1962	(United States) Arnold Palmer	276	−4	5 strokes	(United States) Mason Rudolph
1961	(United States) Jay Hebert	278	−2	Playoff	(South Africa) Gary Player
