= 1976 PGA Tour =

Golf tour season

1976 PGA Tour season
- Duration: January 8, 1976 – November 7, 1976
- Number of official events: 45
- Most wins: (United States) Ben Crenshaw (3) (United States) Johnny Miller (3) (United States) Hubert Green (3)
- Money list: (United States) Jack Nicklaus
- PGA Player of the Year: (United States) Jack Nicklaus

The 1976 PGA Tour was the 61st season of the PGA Tour, the main professional golf tour in the United States. It was also the eighth season since separating from the PGA of America.

== Schedule ==
The following table lists official events during the 1976 season.

Date	Tournament	Location	Purse (US$)	Winner(s) (Note: The number in parentheses after each winner's name is the number of PGA Tour events they had won up to and including that tournament. This information is only shown for PGA Tour members.)	Notes
Jan 11	NBC Tucson Open	Arizona	200,000	(United States) Johnny Miller (16)	
Jan 18	Phoenix Open	Arizona	200,000	(United States) Bob Gilder (1)	
Jan 25	Bing Crosby National Pro-Am	California	185,000	(United States) Ben Crenshaw (2)	Pro-Am
Feb 1	Hawaiian Open	Hawaii	230,000	(United States) Ben Crenshaw (3)	
Feb 8	Bob Hope Desert Classic	California	180,000	(United States) Johnny Miller (17)	Pro-Am
Feb 15	Andy Williams-San Diego Open Invitational	California	180,000	(United States) J. C. Snead (5)	
Feb 22	Glen Campbell-Los Angeles Open	California	185,000	(United States) Hale Irwin (6)	
Mar 1	Tournament Players Championship	Florida	300,000	(United States) Jack Nicklaus (60)	Special event
Mar 7	Florida Citrus Open	Florida	200,000	(United States) Hale Irwin (7)	
Mar 14	Doral-Eastern Open	Florida	200,000	(United States) Hubert Green (9)	
Mar 21	Greater Jacksonville Open	Florida	175,000	(United States) Hubert Green (10)	
Mar 28	Sea Pines Heritage Classic	South Carolina	215,000	(United States) Hubert Green (11)	Invitational
Apr 4	Greater Greensboro Open	North Carolina	230,000	(United States) Al Geiberger (8)	
Apr 11	Masters Tournament	Georgia	200,000	(United States) Raymond Floyd (7)	Major championship
Apr 11	Magnolia Classic	Mississippi	35,000	(United States) Dennis Meyer (n/a)	Second Tour (Note: Official money; unofficial win.)
Apr 18	MONY Tournament of Champions	California	225,000	(United States) Don January (10)	Winners-only event
Apr 18	Tallahassee Open	Florida	80,000	(United States) Gary Koch (1)	Alternate event
Apr 25	First NBC New Orleans Open	Louisiana	175,000	(United States) Larry Ziegler (3)	
May 2	Houston Open	Texas	200,000	(United States) Lee Elder (2)	
May 9	Byron Nelson Golf Classic	Texas	200,000	(United States) Mark Hayes (1)	
May 16	Colonial National Invitation	Texas	200,000	(United States) Lee Trevino (21)	Invitational
May 23	Danny Thomas Memphis Classic	Tennessee	200,000	(United States) Gibby Gilbert (2)	
May 30	Memorial Tournament	Ohio	200,000	(United States) Roger Maltbie (3)	New tournament Invitational
Jun 6	IVB-Bicentennial Golf Classic	Pennsylvania	200,000	(United States) Tom Kite (1)	
Jun 13	Kemper Open	North Carolina	250,000	(United States) Joe Inman (1)	
Jun 20	U.S. Open	Georgia	210,000	(United States) Jerry Pate (1)	Major championship
Jun 27	Western Open	Illinois	200,000	(United States) Al Geiberger (9)	
Jul 4	Greater Milwaukee Open	Wisconsin	130,000	(United States) Dave Hill (13)	
Jul 10	The Open Championship	England	£75,000	(United States) Johnny Miller (18)	Major championship (Note: Unofficial money event at the time, but retrospectively counted as an official win.)
Jul 11	Ed McMahon-Jaycees Quad Cities Open	Illinois	100,000	(New Zealand) John Lister (1)	Alternate event
Jul 18	American Express Westchester Classic	New York	300,000	(Australia) David Graham (2)	
Jul 25	Canadian Open	Canada	200,000	(United States) Jerry Pate (2)	
Aug 1	Pleasant Valley Classic	Massachusetts	200,000	(United States) Buddy Allin (5)	
Aug 8	B.C. Open	New York	200,000	(United States) Bob Wynn (1)	
Aug 16	PGA Championship	Maryland	250,000	(United States) Dave Stockton (10)	Major championship
Aug 22	Sammy Davis Jr.-Greater Hartford Open	Connecticut	210,000	(United States) Rik Massengale (2)	
Aug 29	American Golf Classic	Ohio	200,000	(Australia) David Graham (3)	
Aug 29	Buick Open	Michigan	60,000	(United States) Ed Sabo (n/a)	Second Tour
Sep 5	World Series of Golf	Ohio	300,000	(United States) Jack Nicklaus (61)	Upgraded to official event Limited-field event
Sep 12	World Open Golf Championship	North Carolina	200,000	(United States) Raymond Floyd (8)	
Sep 19	Ohio Kings Island Open	Ohio	150,000	(United States) Ben Crenshaw (4)	
Sep 26	Kaiser International Open Invitational	California	175,000	(United States) J. C. Snead (6)	
Oct 3	Sahara Invitational	Nevada	135,000	(United States) George Archer (12)	
Oct 17	San Antonio Texas Open	Texas	125,000	(United States) Butch Baird (2)	
Oct 24	Southern Open	Georgia	125,000	(United States) Mac McLendon (2)	
Nov 1	Pensacola Open	Florida	125,000	(United States) Mark Hayes (2)	
Nov 7	Walt Disney World National Team Championship	Florida	200,000	(United States) Woody Blackburn (1) and (United States) Billy Kratzert (1)	Team event

=== Unofficial events ===
The following events were sanctioned by the PGA Tour, but did not carry official money, nor were wins official.

Date	Tournament	Location	Purse ($)	Winner(s)	Notes
Dec 12	World Cup	California	4,200	(Spain) Seve Ballesteros and (Spain) Manuel Piñero	Team event
Dec 12	World Cup Individual Trophy	California	2,100	(Mexico) Ernesto Pérez Acosta	

== Money list ==
The money list was based on prize money won during the season, calculated in U.S. dollars.

Position	Player	Prize money ($)
1	(United States) Jack Nicklaus	266,438
2	(United States) Ben Crenshaw	257,759
3	(United States) Hale Irwin	252,718
4	(United States) Hubert Green	228,031
5	(United States) Al Geiberger	194,821
6	(United States) J. C. Snead	192,645
7	(United States) Raymond Floyd	178,318
8	(Australia) David Graham	176,174
9	(United States) Don January	163,622
10	(United States) Jerry Pate	153,102

== Awards ==
Award	Winner	Ref.
PGA Player of the Year	(United States) Jack Nicklaus	
Scoring leader (Vardon Trophy)	(United States) Don January	
