= Arnold Palmer =

American professional golfer (1929–2016)

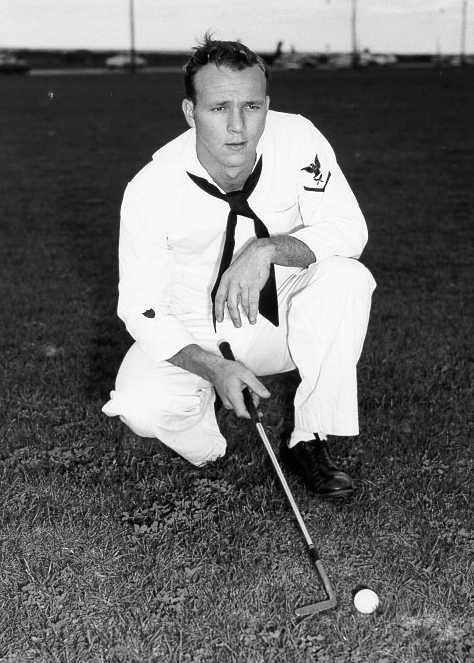
- Palmer while in the U.S. Coast Guard, 1953

Personal information
- Full name: Arnold Daniel Palmer
- Nickname: The King
- Nationality: United States
- Born: September 10, 1929 Latrobe, Pennsylvania, U.S.
- Died: September 25, 2016 (aged 87) Pittsburgh, Pennsylvania, U.S.
- Height: 5 ft 10 in (178 cm)
- Weight: 185 lb (84 kg; 13 st 3 lb)
- Spouses: Winifred Walzer (m. 1954; died 1999) Kathleen Gawthrop (m. 2005)
- Children: 2

Career
- Sport: Golf
- College: Wake Forest College
- Turned professional: 1954
- Former tours: PGA Tour; Senior PGA Tour
- Professional wins: 95

Number of wins by tour
- PGA Tour: 62 (5th all-time)
- European Tour: 2
- PGA Tour of Australasia: 2
- PGA Tour Champions: 10
- Other: 21

Best results in major championships (wins: 7)
- Masters Tournament: Won: 1958, 1960, 1962, 1964
- PGA Championship: T2: 1964, 1968, 1970
- U.S. Open: Won: 1960
- The Open Championship: Won: 1961, 1962

Achievements and awards
- World Golf Hall of Fame: 1974 (member page)
- PGA Tour money list winner: 1958, 1960, 1962, 1963
- PGA Player of the Year: 1960, 1962
- Sports Illustrated Sportsman of the Year: 1960
- Vardon Trophy: 1961, 1962, 1964, 1967
- Bob Jones Award: 1971
- Old Tom Morris Award: 1983
- PGA Tour Lifetime Achievement Award: 1998
- Payne Stewart Award: 2000

Arnold Daniel Palmer (September 10, 1929 – September 25, 2016) was an American professional golfer who is widely regarded as one of the greatest and most charismatic players in the sport's history. Since embarking on a professional career in 1955, he won numerous events on both the PGA Tour and the circuit now known as PGA Tour Champions. Nicknamed "the King", Palmer was one of golf's most popular stars and seen as a trailblazer, the first superstar of the sport's television age, which began in the 1950s.

Palmer's social impact on golf was unrivaled among fellow professionals; his modest origins and plain-spoken popularity helped change the perception of golf from an elite, upper-class pastime of private clubs to a more populist sport accessible to middle and working classes via public courses. Palmer, Jack Nicklaus, and Gary Player were "The Big Three" in golf during the 1960s; they are credited with popularizing and commercializing the sport around the world.

In a career spanning more than six decades, Palmer won 62 PGA Tour titles from 1955 to 1973. He is fifth on the Tour's all-time victory list, trailing only Sam Snead, Tiger Woods, Jack Nicklaus, and Ben Hogan. He won seven major titles in a six-plus-year domination from the 1958 Masters to the 1964 Masters. He also won the PGA Tour Lifetime Achievement Award in 1998, and in 1974 was one of the 13 original inductees into the World Golf Hall of Fame.

== Early life ==
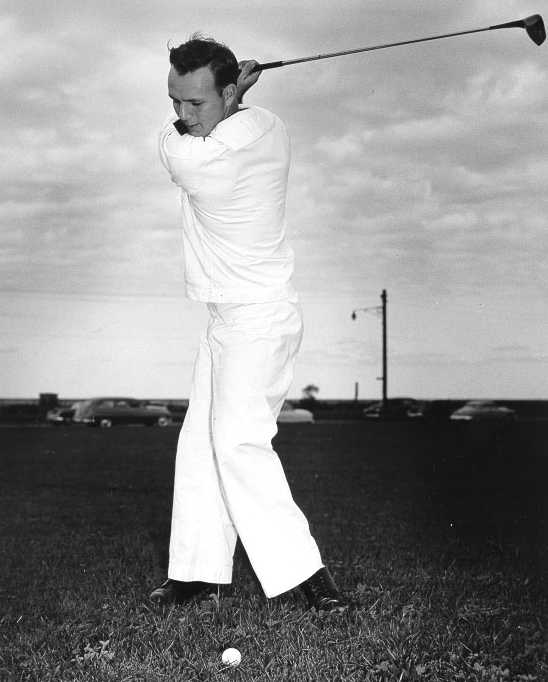
Palmer in 1953

Arnold Daniel Palmer was born on September 10, 1929, to Doris (née Morrison) and Milfred Jerome "Deacon" Palmer in Latrobe, Pennsylvania, a working-class steel mill town. He learned golf from his father, who had suffered from polio at a young age and was head professional and greenskeeper at Latrobe Country Club, which allowed young Palmer to accompany his father as he maintained the course.

Palmer attended Wake Forest College on a golf scholarship. He left upon the death of close friend Bud Worsham and enlisted in the U.S. Coast Guard, where he served for three years, 1951–1954. At the Coast Guard Training Center in Cape May, New Jersey, he built a nine-hole course and had some time to continue to hone his golf skills. After Palmer's enlistment term ended, he returned to college and competitive golf.

Palmer won the 1954 U.S. Amateur in Detroit and made the decision to turn pro in November of that year. "That victory was the turning point in my life," he said. "It gave me confidence I could compete at the highest level of the game." When reporters there asked Gene Littler who the young golfer was that was cracking balls on the practice tee, Littler said: "That's Arnold Palmer. He's going to be a great player some day. When he hits the ball, the earth shakes."

After winning that match, Palmer quit his job selling paint and played in the Waite Memorial tournament in Shawnee-on-Delaware, Pennsylvania. There, he met his future wife, Winifred Walzer, and they remained married for 45 years until her death in 1999.

On November 17, 1954, Palmer announced his intentions to turn pro. "What other people find in poetry, I find in the flight of a good drive," Palmer said.

== Career ==
Palmer's first tour win came during his 1955 rookie season, when he won the Canadian Open and earned $2,400 for his efforts. He improved steadily, winning twice in 1956 and four times in 1957 before winning his major championship win at the 1958 Masters Tournament (where he earned $11,250) which established his position as one of the leading stars of the game. Palmer's charisma was a major factor in establishing golf as a compelling television event in the 1950s and 1960s, which set the stage for the popularity it enjoys today.

By 1960 he had signed up as pioneering sports agent Mark McCormack's first client. In later interviews, McCormack listed five attributes that made Palmer especially marketable: his handsomeness; his relatively modest background (his father was a greenskeeper before rising to be club professional and Latrobe was a humble club); the way he played golf, taking risks and wearing his emotions on his sleeve; his involvement in a string of exciting finishes in early televised tournaments; and his affability.

Palmer is also credited by many for securing the status of The Open Championship (British Open) among U.S. players. Before Ben Hogan won that championship in 1953, few American professionals had traveled to play in The Open, due to its extensive travel requirements, its relatively small purse, and the style of its links courses (radically different from most American courses). Palmer wanted to emulate the feats of his predecessors Bobby Jones, Sam Snead and Hogan in his quest to become a leading American golfer.

In particular, Palmer traveled to Scotland in 1960 to compete in the British Open for the first time. He had already won both the Masters and U.S. Open and was trying to emulate Hogan's 1953 feat of winning all three tournaments in a single year. Palmer played what he himself said were the four best rounds of his career, shooting 70-71-70-68. His scores had the British excitedly claiming that Palmer may well be the greatest golfer ever to play the game. Although he failed to win, losing out to Kel Nagle by a single shot, his subsequent Open wins in the early 1960s convinced many American pros that a trip to Britain would be worth the effort, and certainly secured Palmer's popularity among British and European fans, not just American ones.

Palmer was greatly disappointed by his runner-up finish in the 1960 British Open. His appearance overseas drew American attention to the Open Championship, which had previously been ignored by the American golfers. Palmer went on to win the Open Championship in 1961 and 1962, and last played in it in 1995. Martin Slumbers, chief executive of The R&A, called Palmer "a true gentleman, one of the greatest ever to play the game and a truly iconic figure in sport". His participation in The Open Championship in the early 1960s "was the catalyst to truly internationalize golf," said European Tour chief executive Keith Pelley.

Palmer won seven major championships:

- Masters Tournament: 1958, 1960, 1962, 1964
- U.S. Open: 1960
- The Open Championship: 1961, 1962

Palmer's most prolific years were 1960–1963, when he won 29 PGA Tour events, including five major tournaments, in four seasons. In 1960, he won the Hickok Belt as the top professional athlete of the year and Sports Illustrated magazine's "Sportsman of the Year" award. He built up a wide fan base, often referred to as "Arnie's Army", and in 1967 he became the first man to reach $1 million in career earnings on the PGA Tour. By the late 1960s Jack Nicklaus and Gary Player had both acquired clear ascendancy in their rivalry, but Palmer won a PGA Tour event every year from 1955 to 1971 inclusive, and in 1971 he enjoyed a revival, winning four events.

For each of his wins at the Masters, Palmer's caddie was Nathaniel "Iron Man" Avery; at the time, Augusta National required all golfers to use the club's own caddies.

Palmer won the Vardon Trophy for lowest scoring average four times: 1961, 1962, 1964, and 1967. He played on six Ryder Cup teams: 1961, 1963, 1965, 1967, 1971, and 1973. He was the last playing captain in 1963, and captained the team again in 1975.

Palmer was eligible for the Senior PGA Tour (now PGA Tour Champions) from its first season in 1980, and he was one of the marquee names who helped it to become successful. He won ten events on the tour, including five senior majors.

Palmer won the first World Match Play Championship that was held in England. The event was originally organized by McCormack to showcase his stable of players. Their partnership was one of the most significant in the history of sports marketing. Long after he ceased to win tournaments, Palmer remained one of the highest earners in golf due to his appeal to sponsors and the public.

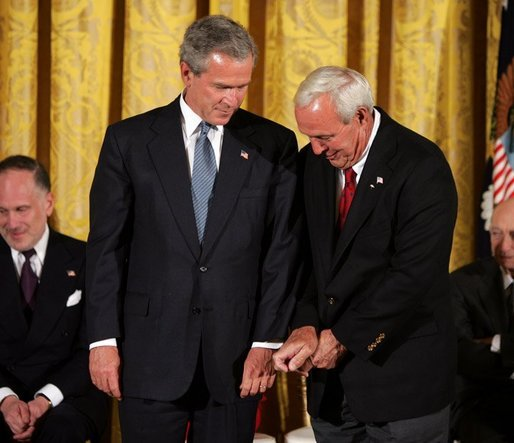
Palmer gives President George W. Bush golf tips before being awarded the Presidential Medal of Freedom, 2004

In 2004, he competed in the Masters Tournament for the last time, marking his 50th consecutive appearance in that event. At his death, he and Jack Nicklaus were the only two Masters champions to be regular members of Masters organizer Augusta National Golf Club (as opposed to the honorary membership the club grants to all Masters champions).

From 2007 until his death, Palmer served as an honorary starter for the Masters. He retired from tournament golf on October 13, 2006, when he withdrew from the Champions Tours' Administaff Small Business Classic after four holes due to dissatisfaction with his own play. He played the remaining holes but did not keep score.

=== Golf businesses ===
Palmer had a diverse golf-related business career, including owning the Bay Hill Club and Lodge in Orlando, Florida, which is the venue for the PGA Tour's Arnold Palmer Invitational (renamed from the Bay Hill Invitational in 2007), helping to found The Golf Channel, and negotiating the deal to build the first golf course in the People's Republic of China. This led to the formation of Palmer Course Design in 1972, which was renamed Arnold Palmer Design Company when the company moved to Orlando, Florida, in 2006. Palmer's design partner was Ed Seay.

Palmer designed more than 300 golf courses in 37 states, 25 countries, and five continents (all except Africa and Antarctica), including the golf course at Henry Fok's Zhongshan Hot Springs Hotel, which was one of the first golf courses built in China since the founding of the People's Republic of China. In 1971, he purchased Latrobe Country Club (where his father used to be the club professional) and owned it until his death. The licensing, endorsements, spokesman associations and commercial partnerships built by Palmer and McCormack are managed by Arnold Palmer Enterprises. Palmer was also a member of the American Society of Golf Course Architects.

In 1997, Palmer and fellow golfer Tiger Woods initiated a civil case in an effort to stop the unauthorized sale of their images and alleged signatures in the memorabilia market. The lawsuit was filed against Bruce Matthews, the owner of Gotta Have It Golf, Inc. and others. Matthews and associated parties counter-claimed that Palmer and associated businesses committed several acts, including breach of contract, breach of implied duty of good faith and violations of Florida's Deceptive and Unfair Trade Practices Act. On March 12, 2014, a Florida jury ruled in favor of Gotta Have It on its breach of contract and other related claims. The same jury rejected the counterclaims of Palmer and Woods, and awarded Gotta Have It $668,346 in damages.

One of Palmer's most recent products (mass-produced starting in 2001) is a branded use of the beverage known as the Arnold Palmer, which combines sweetened iced tea with lemonade.

=== Automotive businesses ===
As a member of the Lincoln-Mercury Sports Panel, in the early 1970s Palmer was a brand ambassador for Lincoln-Mercury. In 1974, Palmer, along with partners Mark McCormack and Don Massey, purchased a Cadillac dealership on Independence Boulevard in Charlotte, North Carolina. The dealership was relocated to nearby Pineville in 2008. Over the years, Palmer would acquire several other dealerships in several states, including a Buick-Cadillac store in his hometown of Latrobe. The North Carolina dealership was sold to Sonic Automotive in 2011 and renamed 'Cadillac of South Charlotte'. It is still in operation today. The Latrobe dealership, known as Arnold Palmer Motors, closed in 2017 after 36 years in business and several months after his death.

== Legacy ==
As a measure of his popularity, Palmer, like Elvis Presley before him, was known simply as "The King." But in a life bursting from the seams with success, Palmer never lost his common touch. He was a man of the people, willing to sign every autograph, shake every hand, and tried to look every person in his gallery in the eye.

— Golf Week

According to Adam Schupak of Golf Week, "No one did more to popularize the sport than Palmer". "His dashing presence singlehandedly took golf out of the country clubs and into the mainstream. Quite simply, he made golf cool." Jack Nicklaus said:

Arnold transcended the game of golf. He was more than a golfer or even great golfer. He was an icon. He was a legend. Arnold was someone who was a pioneer in his sport. He took the game from one level to a higher level, virtually by himself.

He is mentioned by James Bond's caddie in Goldfinger: "If that's [Goldfinger's] original ball, I'm Arnold Palmer."

In 2000, Palmer was ranked the sixth greatest player of all time in Golf Digest magazine's rankings, and by 2008 had earned an estimated $30 million.

Palmer was inducted into Omicron Delta Kappa - The National Leadership Honor Society in 1964 at Wake Forest University. In 1986, he was inducted into the National High School Hall of Fame. He won the inaugural Scripps Howard Super Sage Award in 2003. He was awarded the Presidential Medal of Freedom in 2004 and the Congressional Gold Medal in 2009. He was the first golfer to be awarded the Presidential Medal of Freedom and the second golfer, after Byron Nelson, to be awarded the Congressional Gold Medal.

In addition to Palmer's impressive list of awards, he was bestowed the honor of kicking off the Masters Tournament beginning in 2007. From 2007 to 2009, Palmer was the sole honorary starter. In 2010, longtime friend and competitor Jack Nicklaus was appointed by Augusta National to join Palmer. In 2012, golf's The Big Three reunited as South African golfer Gary Player joined for the ceremonial tee shots as honorary starters for the 76th playing of the Masters Tournament. In describing the effect that Palmer had on the sport, biographer James Dodson stated:

We loved him with a mythic American joy ... He represented everything that is great about golf. The friendship, the fellowship, the laughter, the impossibility of golf, the sudden rapture moment that brings you back, a moment that you never forget, that's Arnold Palmer in spades. He's the defining figure in golf.

== Personal life ==
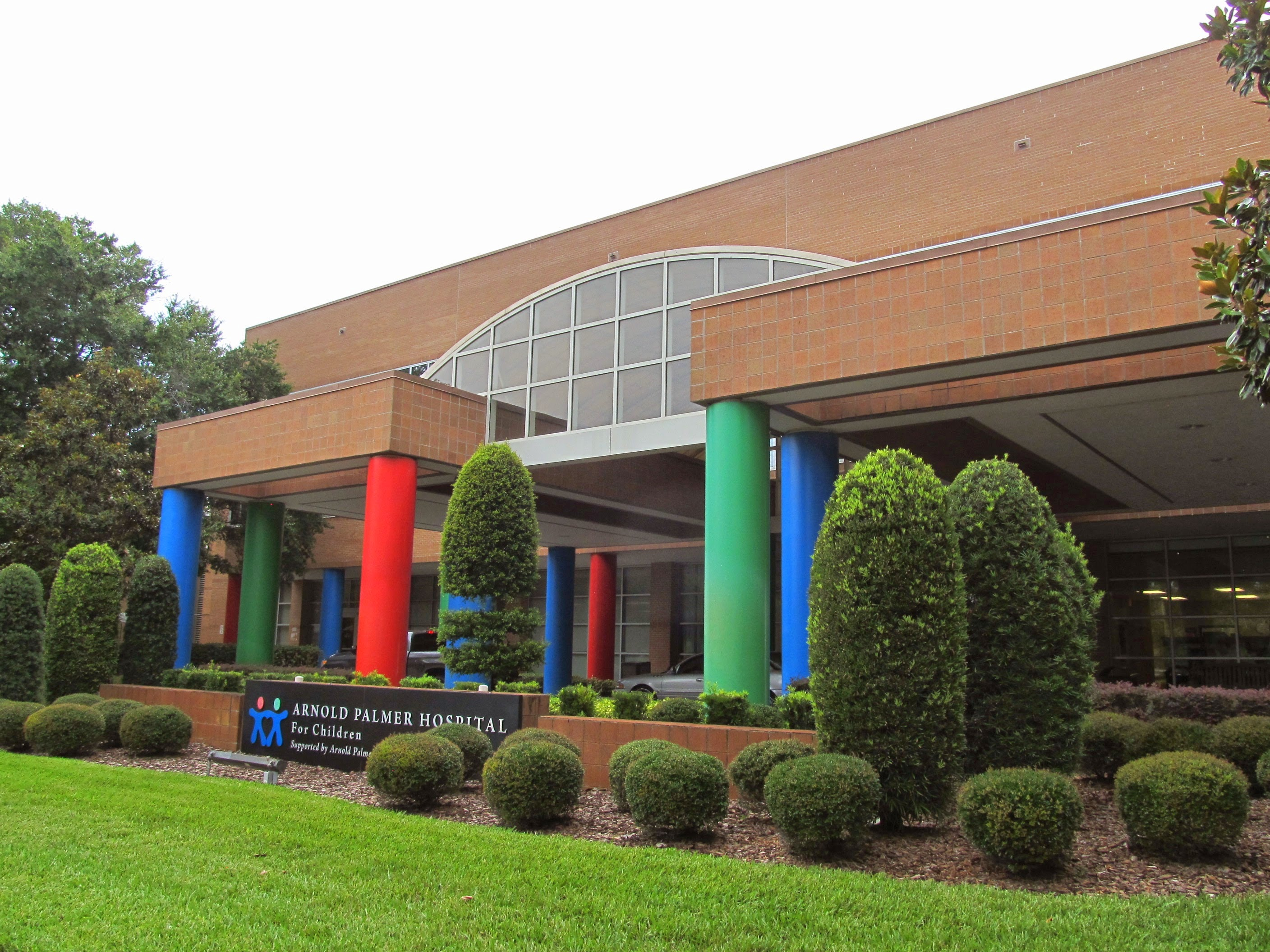
The Arnold Palmer Hospital for Children in Orlando, Florida

Palmer was married to the former Winnie Walzer for 45 years; the couple had two daughters, Peggy and Amy. Winnie died at age 65 on November 20, 1999, of complications from ovarian cancer.

Palmer's grandson Sam Saunders is a professional golfer who grew up playing at Bay Hill, where he won the club championship at age 15. Saunders attended Clemson University in South Carolina on a golf scholarship and turned pro in 2008. He stated that Palmer's family nickname is "Dumpy.”

Palmer married his second wife, Kathleen Gawthrop, in 2005 in Hawaii.

During the spring and summer months, Palmer resided in Latrobe, and he spent winters in Orlando and La Quinta, California. He first visited Orlando in 1948 during a college match. When he took up residence in Orlando, Palmer helped the city become a recreation destination, "turning the entire state of Florida into a golfing paradise.” That included building one of the premier events on the PGA Tour there, along with his contributions to new hospitals. On hearing about Palmer's death, Tiger Woods said, "My kids were born at the Winnie Palmer Hospital for Women & Babies, and his philanthropic work will be remembered along with his accomplishments in golf." Arnold Palmer Boulevard is named in his honor.

Palmer was a member of the Freemasons since 1958. Palmer created the Arnie's Army Charitable Foundation to help children and youth. The Foundation saw the creation of the Winnie Palmer Hospital for Women & Babies Center, The Howard Philips Center for Children & Families, the Arnold Palmer Hospital for Children, and the Winnie Palmer Nature Reserve. He and O.J. Simpson were spokespersons for Hertz Rent-a-Car. Palmer served on the advisory board of U.S. English, a group that supports making English the official language of the United States.

During his playing career, Palmer smoked cigarettes, which caused him to battle an addiction to nicotine. He noted that many of his colleagues smoked, and he even endorsed the product in television commercials. Later in life, Palmer made a complete about-face and urged the public to give up smoking. He said that cigarette smoking has a negative effect on every organ in the body. As a testimonial for smoking cessation products, he was depicted in a 1989 photo by Robert Straus that was subject to copyright litigation as late as 20 years later.

Palmer was a Republican and donated money to Pat Toomey, John McCain, Mitt Romney, Rick Santorum, and George W. Bush. He was approached on multiple occasions by the Republican Party encouraging him to run for political office, but he declined on each occasion.

In a September 2018 interview with The Sporting News, Palmer's daughter, Peggy, characterized Palmer as a Goldwater Republican. She also said that her father was personal friends with president Dwight D. Eisenhower, who gave Palmer one of his paintings as a birthday present. Palmer also knew Donald Trump because Trump organized several golf tournaments. According to Peggy, Palmer appreciated Trump's support for the game. However, around the time of Palmer's death, which was during Trump's 2016 presidential campaign, Palmer showed disgust towards Trump and made unflattering comments about him.

=== Pilot ===
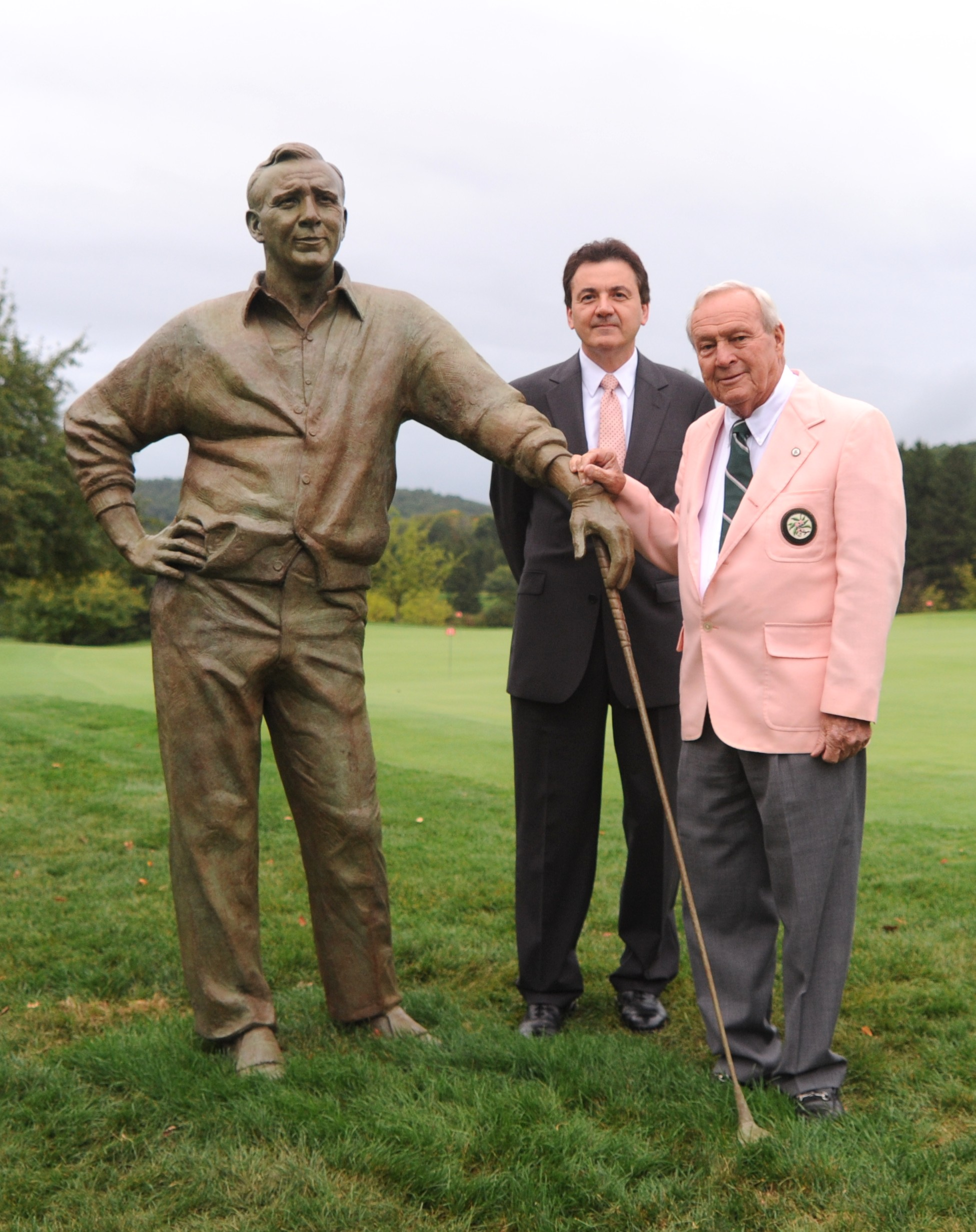
Arnold Palmer statue unveiled at Laurel Valley Golf Course on September 10, 2009, in honor of Palmer's 80th birthday. Pictured: Arnold Palmer with sculptor Zenos Frudakis.

Palmer's early "fear of flying" led him to pursue his pilot certificate. After almost 55 years, he logged nearly 20,000 hours of flight time in various aircraft. His personal website reads:

Next to marrying his wife, Winnie, and deciding on a professional career in golf, there's only one decision Arnold Palmer considers smarter. Learning how to fly an airplane.

On Palmer's 70th birthday in 1999, Westmoreland County Airport in Latrobe was renamed Arnold Palmer Regional Airport in his honor. According to their website: "[The airport] started as the Longview Flying Field in 1924. It became J.D. Hill Airport in 1928, Latrobe Airport in 1935 and Westmoreland County Airport in 1978. Complementing a rich history rooted in some of the earliest pioneers of aviation, the name was changed to Arnold Palmer Regional in 1999 to honor the Latrobe native golf legend who grew up less than a mile from the runway where he watched the world's first official airmail pickup in 1939 and later learned to fly himself." There is a statue of Palmer made by Zenos Frudakis, holding a golf club in front of the airport's entrance, unveiled in 2007.

Palmer piloted a plane for the last time on January 31, 2011, and flew from Palm Springs in California to Orlando in his Cessna Citation X.

== Books ==
- A Life Well Played: My Stories (2016) ISBN 9781250085948
- Reflections on the Game (2012, with Thomas Hauser. Originally published as Arnold Palmer: A Personal Journey, 1994) ISBN 9780002554688
- Arnold Palmer: Memories, Stories, and Memorabilia from a Life on and off the Course (2004) ISBN 9781584793304
- Playing by the Rules: The Rules of Golf Explained & Illustrated from a Lifetime in the Game (2002) ISBN 9780743450225
- A Golfer's Life (1999, with James Dodson) ISBN 9780345414816
- Arnold Palmer's Complete Book of Putting (1986, with Peter Dobereiner) ISBN 9780689116247
- Arnold Palmer's Best 54 Golf Holes (1977) ISBN 9780385052597
- Go for Broke! My Philosophy of Winning Golf (1973, with William Barry Furlong) ISBN 9780671214784
- 495 Golf Lessons (1973, with Earl Puckett) ISBN 9780695804022
- Golf Tactics (1970) ISBN 9780695804022
- Situation Golf (1970) ISBN 978-0841500235
- My Game and Yours (1965) ISBN 9780671471958

== Death ==
Palmer died on September 25, 2016, while awaiting heart surgery at the University of Pittsburgh Medical Center (Shadyside) in Pittsburgh, Pennsylvania. He was admitted three days earlier to undergo testing on his heart. After his funeral, he was cremated and his ashes were scattered in his hometown at Latrobe Country Club. His estate was valued at $875 million and was divided between his two daughters, his second wife (who received $10 million), eight employees who received $25,000 each, and his charity, Arnie's Army, which received $10 million.

=== Tributes ===
From a humble start working at the local club in his beloved Latrobe, Pennsylvania, to superstardom as the face of golf around the globe, Arnold was the American Dream come to life... Today, Michelle and I stand with Arnie's Army in saluting the King.

— President Barack Obama

Less than a week after Palmer died, his life was celebrated by both teams at the Ryder Cup at Hazeltine National Golf Club in Chaska, Minnesota, just outside the Twin Cities. The celebration included a video tribute and a moment of silence during the opening ceremony, which also included tributes from the opposing captains—Davis Love III for Team USA and Northern Ireland's Darren Clarke for Team Europe—and the opposing honorary captains—Nicklaus for Team USA and England's Tony Jacklin for Team Europe. During the matches, the players paid tribute to Palmer, which included wearing a special logo, button and pin. Palmer's bag from the 1975 Ryder Cup was also placed on the first tee as a tribute. Palmer had won more than 22 Ryder Cup matches and had also captained Team USA to two victories, in addition to holding or being tied for the records for youngest captain, most career singles points and most points in a single Ryder Cup. PGA of America president Derek Sprague stated:

The game has never known a more enthusiastic sportsman than Arnold Palmer. So it is fitting that we pay tribute to Mr. Palmer during the 41st Ryder Cup, to celebrate it in a very special way, the life of an unforgettable champion and gracious ambassador of the game.

Two days after a 17–11 victory, which marked the first American Ryder Cup triumph since 2008 at Valhalla and which Love dedicated to Palmer, the majority of the team attended the memorial service for Palmer at St. Vincent College in Latrobe and also brought the trophy after Palmer's daughter Amy asked the team if they could do so.

A Golden Palm Star on the Palm Springs Walk of Stars was dedicated to Palmer on January 1, 2017.

The United States Postal Service issued a commemorative stamp honoring Palmer on March 4, 2020.

== Amateur wins ==
- 1946 WPIAL Championship, PIAA Championship
- 1947 WPIAL Championship, PIAA Championship, Western Pennsylvania Junior, Western Pennsylvania Amateur
- 1948 Southern Conference Championship, Sunnehanna Invitational, Western Pennsylvania Junior
- 1950 Southern Intercollegiate, Western Pennsylvania Amateur, Greensburg Invitational
- 1951 Western Pennsylvania Amateur, Worsham Memorial
- 1952 Western Pennsylvania Amateur, Greensburg Invitational
- 1953 Ohio Amateur, Cleveland Amateur, Greensburg Invitational, Mayfield Heights Open, Evergreen Pitch and Putt Invitational
- 1954 U.S. Amateur, Ohio Amateur, All-American Amateur, Atlantic Coast Conference Championship, Bill Waite Memorial

=== Amateur major wins (1) ===
Year	Championship	Winning score	Runner-up
1954	U.S. Amateur	1 up	(United States) Robert Sweeny Jr.

=== Results timeline ===
Tournament	1948	1949	1950	1951	1952	1953	1954
U.S. Amateur	R256	R64	R256			R16	1

Win
Top 10
Did not play

R256, R128, R64, R32, R16, QF, SF = Round in which player lost in match play

== Professional wins (95) ==
=== PGA Tour wins (62) ===
Legend
Major championships (7)
Other PGA Tour (55)

No.	Date	Tournament	Winning score	Margin of victory	Runner(s)-up
1	Aug 20, 1955	Canadian Open	−23 (64-67-64-70=265)	4 strokes	(United States) Jack Burke Jr.
2	Jul 1, 1956	Insurance City Open	−10 (66-69-68-71=274)	Playoff	(United States) Ted Kroll
3	Jul 29, 1956	Eastern Open	−11 (70-66-69-72=277)	2 strokes	(United States) Dow Finsterwald
4	Feb 25, 1957	Houston Open	−9 (67-72-71-69=279)	1 stroke	(United States) Doug Ford
5	Mar 31, 1957	Azalea Open	−6 (70-67-70-75=282)	1 stroke	(United States) Dow Finsterwald
6	Jun 9, 1957	Rubber City Open Invitational	−12 (71-66-67-68=272)	Playoff	(United States) Doug Ford
7	Nov 3, 1957	San Diego Open Invitational	−17 (65-68-68-70=271)	1 stroke	(Canada) Al Balding
8	Mar 23, 1958	St. Petersburg Open Invitational	−8 (70-69-72-65=276)	1 stroke	(United States) Dow Finsterwald, (United States) Fred Hawkins
9	Apr 6, 1958	Masters Tournament	−4 (70-73-68-73=284)	1 stroke	(United States) Doug Ford, (United States) Fred Hawkins
10	Jun 29, 1958	Pepsi Championship	−11 (66-69-67-71=273)	5 strokes	(United States) Jay Hebert
11	Jan 25, 1959	Thunderbird Invitational	−18 (67-70-67-62=266)	3 strokes	(United States) Jimmy Demaret, (United States) Ken Venturi
12	May 11, 1959	Oklahoma City Open Invitational	−15 (73-64-67-69=273)	2 strokes	(United States) Bob Goalby
13	Nov 29, 1959	West Palm Beach Open Invitational	−7 (72-67-66-76=281)	Playoff	(United States) Gay Brewer, (United States) Pete Cooper
14	Feb 7, 1960	Palm Springs Desert Golf Classic	−20 (67-73-67-66-65=338)	3 strokes	(United States) Fred Hawkins
15	Feb 28, 1960	Texas Open Invitational	−12 (69-65-67-75=276)	2 strokes	(United States) Doug Ford, (United States) Frank Stranahan
16	Mar 6, 1960	Baton Rouge Open Invitational	−9 (71-71-69-68=279)	7 strokes	(United States) Jay Hebert, (United States) Ron Reif, (United States) Doug Sanders
17	Mar 13, 1960	Pensacola Open Invitational	−15 (68-65-73-67=273)	1 stroke	(United States) Doug Sanders
18	Apr 10, 1960	Masters Tournament (2)	−6 (67-73-72-70=282)	1 stroke	(United States) Ken Venturi
19	Jun 18, 1960	U.S. Open	−4 (72-71-72-65=280)	2 strokes	(United States) Jack Nicklaus (a)
20	Aug 7, 1960	Insurance City Open Invitational (2)	−14 (70-68-66-66=270)	Playoff	(United States) Bill Collins, (United States) Jack Fleck
21	Nov 27, 1960	Mobile Sertoma Open Invitational	−14 (68-67-74-65=274)	2 strokes	(United States) Johnny Pott
22	Jan 15, 1961	San Diego Open Invitational (2)	−13 (69-68-69-65=271)	Playoff	(Canada) Al Balding
23	Feb 13, 1961	Phoenix Open Invitational	−10 (69-65-66-70=270)	Playoff	(United States) Doug Sanders
24	Feb 26, 1961	Baton Rouge Open Invitational (2)	−14 (65-67-68-66=266)	7 strokes	(United States) Wes Ellis
25	Apr 30, 1961	Texas Open Invitational (2)	−14 (67-63-72-68=270)	1 stroke	(Canada) Al Balding
26	Jun 25, 1961	Western Open	−13 (65-70-67-69=271)	2 strokes	(United States) Sam Snead
27	Jul 15, 1961	The Open Championship	−4 (70-73-69-72=284)	1 stroke	(Wales) Dai Rees
28	Feb 4, 1962	Palm Springs Golf Classic (2)	−17 (69-67-66-71-69=342)	3 strokes	(United States) Jay Hebert, (United States) Gene Littler
29	Feb 11, 1962	Phoenix Open Invitational (2)	−15 (64-68-71-66=269)	12 strokes	(United States) Billy Casper, (United States) Don Fairfield, (United States) Bob McCallister, (United States) Jack Nicklaus
30	Apr 9, 1962	Masters Tournament (3)	−8 (70-66-69-75=280)	Playoff	(United States) Dow Finsterwald, (South Africa) Gary Player
31	Apr 29, 1962	Texas Open Invitational (3)	−11 (67-69-70-67=273)	1 stroke	(United States) Joe Campbell, (United States) Gene Littler, (United States) Mason Rudolph, (United States) Doug Sanders
32	May 6, 1962	Tournament of Champions	−12 (69-70-69-68=276)	1 stroke	(United States) Billy Casper
33	May 14, 1962	Colonial National Invitation	+1 (67-72-66-76=281)	Playoff	(United States) Johnny Pott
34	Jul 13, 1962	The Open Championship (2)	−12 (71-69-67-69=276)	6 strokes	(Australia) Kel Nagle
35	Aug 12, 1962	American Golf Classic	−4 (67-69-70-70=276)	5 strokes	(United States) Mason Rudolph
36	Jan 7, 1963	Los Angeles Open	−10 (69-69-70-66=274)	3 strokes	(Canada) Al Balding, (South Africa) Gary Player
37	Feb 12, 1963	Phoenix Open Invitational (3)	−15 (68-67-68-70=273)	1 stroke	(South Africa) Gary Player
38	Mar 10, 1963	Pensacola Open Invitational (2)	−15 (69-68-69-67=273)	2 strokes	(United States) Harold Kneece, (South Africa) Gary Player
39	Jun 16, 1963	Thunderbird Classic Invitational	−11 (67-70-68-72=277)	Playoff	(United States) Paul Harney
40	Jul 1, 1963	Cleveland Open Invitational	−11 (71-68-66-68=273)	Playoff	(United States) Tommy Aaron, (United States) Tony Lema
41	Jul 29, 1963	Western Open (2)	−4 (73-67-67-73=280)	Playoff	(United States) Julius Boros, (United States) Jack Nicklaus
42	Oct 6, 1963	Whitemarsh Open Invitational	−7 (70-71-66-74=281)	1 stroke	(United States) Lionel Hebert
43	Apr 12, 1964	Masters Tournament (4)	−12 (69-68-69-70=276)	6 strokes	(United States) Dave Marr, (United States) Jack Nicklaus
44	May 18, 1964	Oklahoma City Open Invitational (2)	−11 (72-69-69-67=277)	2 strokes	(United States) Lionel Hebert
45	May 2, 1965	Tournament of Champions (2)	−11 (66-69-71-71=277)	2 strokes	(United States) Chi-Chi Rodríguez
46	Jan 9, 1966	Los Angeles Open (2)	−11 (72-66-62-73=273)	3 strokes	(United States) Miller Barber, (United States) Paul Harney
47	Apr 18, 1966	Tournament of Champions (3)	−5 (74-70-70-69=283)	Playoff	(United States) Gay Brewer
48	Nov 20, 1966	Houston Champions International (2)	−9 (70-68-68-69=275)	1 stroke	(United States) Gardner Dickinson
49	Jan 29, 1967	Los Angeles Open (3)	−15 (70-64-67-68=269)	5 strokes	(United States) Gay Brewer
50	Feb 19, 1967	Tucson Open Invitational	−15 (66-67-67-73=273)	1 stroke	(United States) Chuck Courtney
51	Aug 13, 1967	American Golf Classic (2)	−4 (70-67-72-67=276)	3 strokes	(United States) Doug Sanders
52	Sep 24, 1967	Thunderbird Classic (2)	−5 (71-71-72-69=283)	1 stroke	(United States) Charles Coody, (United States) Jack Nicklaus, (United States) Art Wall Jr.
53	Feb 4, 1968	Bob Hope Desert Classic (3)	−12 (72-70-67-71-68=348)	Playoff	(United States) Deane Beman
54	Sep 15, 1968	Kemper Open	−12 (69-70-70-67=276)	4 strokes	(Australia) Bruce Crampton, (United States) Art Wall Jr.
55	Nov 30, 1969	Heritage Golf Classic	−1 (68-71-70-74=283)	3 strokes	(United States) Richard Crawford, (United States) Bert Yancey
56	Dec 7, 1969	Danny Thomas-Diplomat Classic	−18 (68-67-70-65=270)	2 strokes	(United States) Gay Brewer
57	Jul 26, 1970	National Four-Ball Team Championship (with (United States) Jack Nicklaus)	−25 (61-67-64-67=259)	3 strokes	(United States) George Archer and (United States) Bobby Nichols, (Australia) Bruce Crampton and (United States) Orville Moody, (United States) Gardner Dickinson and (United States) Sam Snead
58	Feb 14, 1971	Bob Hope Desert Classic (4)	−18 (67-71-66-68-70=342)	Playoff	(United States) Raymond Floyd
59	Mar 14, 1971	Florida Citrus Invitational	−18 (66-68-68-68=270)	1 stroke	(United States) Julius Boros
60	Jul 25, 1971	Westchester Classic	−18 (64-70-68-68=270)	5 strokes	(United States) Gibby Gilbert, (United States) Hale Irwin
61	Aug 1, 1971	National Team Championship (2) (with (United States) Jack Nicklaus)	−27 (62-64-65-66=257)	6 strokes	(United States) Julius Boros and (United States) Bill Collins, (New Zealand) Bob Charles and (Australia) Bruce Devlin
62	Feb 11, 1973	Bob Hope Desert Classic (5)	−17 (71-66-69-68-69=343)	2 strokes	(United States) Jack Nicklaus, (United States) Johnny Miller

PGA Tour playoff record (14–10)

No.	Year	Tournament	Opponent(s)	Result
1	1956	Insurance City Open	(United States) Ted Kroll	Won with birdie on second extra hole
2	1957	Rubber City Open Invitational	(United States) Doug Ford	Won with birdie on sixth extra hole
3	1958	Azalea Open	(United States) Howie Johnson	Lost 18-hole playoff; Johnson: +5 (77), Palmer: +6 (78)
4	1959	West Palm Beach Open Invitational	(United States) Gay Brewer, (United States) Pete Cooper	Won with par on fourth extra hole
5	1960	Houston Classic	(United States) Bill Collins	Lost 18-hole playoff; Collins: −3 (69), Palmer: −1 (71)
6	1960	Insurance City Open Invitational	(United States) Bill Collins, (United States) Jack Fleck	Won with birdie on third extra hole Collins eliminated by birdie on first hole
7	1961	San Diego Open Invitational	(Canada) Al Balding	Won with birdie on first extra hole
8	1961	Phoenix Open Invitational	(United States) Doug Sanders	Won 18-hole playoff; Palmer: −3 (67), Sanders: E (70)
9	1961	500 Festival Open Invitation	(United States) Doug Ford	Lost to birdie on second extra hole
10	1962	Masters Tournament	(United States) Dow Finsterwald, (South Africa) Gary Player	Won 18-hole playoff; Palmer: −4 (68), Player: −1 (71), Finsterwald: +5 (77)
11	1962	Colonial National Invitation	(United States) Johnny Pott	Won 18-hole playoff; Palmer: −1 (69), Pott: +3 (73)
12	1962	U.S. Open	(United States) Jack Nicklaus	Lost 18-hole playoff; Nicklaus: E (71), Palmer: +3 (74)
13	1963	Thunderbird Classic	(United States) Paul Harney	Won with par on first extra hole
14	1963	U.S. Open	(United States) Julius Boros, (United States) Jacky Cupit	Boros won 18-hole playoff; Boros: −1 (70), Cupit: +2 (73), Palmer: +5 (76)
15	1963	Cleveland Open Invitational	(United States) Tommy Aaron, (United States) Tony Lema	Won 18-hole playoff; Palmer: −4 (67), Aaron: −1 (70), Lema: −1 (70)
16	1963	Western Open	(United States) Julius Boros, (United States) Jack Nicklaus	Won 18-hole playoff; Palmer: −1 (70), Boros: E (71), Nicklaus: +2 (73)
17	1964	Pensacola Open Invitational	(United States) Miller Barber, (South Africa) Gary Player	Player won 18-hole playoff; Player: −1 (71), Palmer: E (72), Barber: +2 (74)
18	1964	Cleveland Open Invitational	(United States) Tony Lema	Lost to birdie on first extra hole
19	1966	Bob Hope Desert Classic	(United States) Doug Sanders	Lost to birdie on first extra hole
20	1966	Tournament of Champions	(United States) Gay Brewer	Won 18-hole playoff; Palmer: −3 (69), Brewer: +1 (73)
21	1966	U.S. Open	(United States) Billy Casper	Lost 18-hole playoff; Casper: −1 (69), Palmer: +3 (73)
22	1968	Bob Hope Desert Classic	(United States) Deane Beman	Won with par on second extra hole
23	1970	Byron Nelson Golf Classic	(United States) Jack Nicklaus	Lost to birdie on first extra hole
24	1971	Bob Hope Desert Classic	(United States) Raymond Floyd	Won with birdie on second extra hole

=== European Tour wins (2) ===
No.	Date	Tournament	Winning score	Margin of victory	Runner-up
1	Apr 19, 1975	Spanish Open	−5 (72-69-69-73=283)	1 stroke	(South Africa) John Fourie
2	May 26, 1975	Penfold PGA Championship	+5 (71-70-73-71=285)	2 strokes	(Republic of Ireland) Eamonn Darcy

=== Australian wins (2) ===
No.	Date	Tournament	Winning score	Margin of victory	Runner-up
1	Nov 10, 1963	Wills Masters	−3 (68-77-71-69=285)	2 strokes	(United States) Jack Nicklaus
2	Oct 30, 1966	Australian Open	−20 (67-70-66-73=276)	5 strokes	(Australia) Kel Nagle

=== Latin American wins (2) ===
- 1956 Panama Open, Colombian Open

=== Other wins (12) ===
No.	Date	Tournament	Winning score	Margin of victory	Runner(s)-up
1	Jun 26, 1960	Canada Cup (with (United States) Sam Snead)	−11 (140-139-142-144=565)	8 strokes	England − Bernard Hunt and Harry Weetman
2	Nov 11, 1962	Canada Cup (2) (with (United States) Sam Snead)	−3 (136-137-141-143=557)	2 strokes	Argentina − Fidel de Luca and Roberto De Vicenzo
3	Oct 28, 1963	Canada Cup (3) (with (United States) Jack Nicklaus)	−22 (136-142-138-66=482) (Note: Shortened to 63 holes due to weather.)	3 strokes	Spain − Sebastián Miguel and Ramón Sota
4	Oct 11, 1964	Piccadilly World Match Play Championship	2 and 1		(England) Neil Coles
5	Dec 6, 1964	Canada Cup (4) (with (United States) Jack Nicklaus)	−22 (138-136-132-148=554)	11 strokes	Argentina − Roberto De Vicenzo and Leopoldo Ruiz
6	Nov 14, 1966	Canada Cup (5) (with (United States) Jack Nicklaus)	−28 (135-135-136-142=548)	5 strokes	South Africa − Harold Henning and Gary Player
7	Dec 11, 1966	PGA Team Championship (with (United States) Jack Nicklaus)	−32 (63-66-63-64=256)	3 strokes	(United States) Doug Sanders and (United States) Al Besselink
8	Oct 14, 1967	Piccadilly World Match Play Championship (2)	1 up		(Australia) Peter Thomson
9	Nov 12, 1967	World Cup (6) (with (United States) Jack Nicklaus)	−19 (140-141-140-136=557)	13 strokes	New Zealand − Bob Charles and Walter Godfrey
10	Nov 12, 1967	World Cup International Trophy	−12 (68-70-71-67=276)	5 strokes	(New Zealand) Bob Charles, (United States) Jack Nicklaus
11	Oct 17, 1971	Trophée Lancôme	−14 (66-65-71=202)	2 strokes	(South Africa) Gary Player
12	Aug 17, 1980	Labatt's International Golf Classic	−9 (68-68-64-71=271)	1 stroke	(Japan) Isao Aoki

=== Senior PGA Tour wins (10) ===
Legend
Senior PGA Tour major championships (5)
Other Senior PGA Tour (5)

No.	Date	Tournament	Winning score	Margin of victory	Runner(s)-up
1	Dec 7, 1980	PGA Seniors' Championship	+1 (72-69-73-75=289)	Playoff	(United States) Paul Harney
2	Jul 12, 1981	U.S. Senior Open	+9 (72-76-68-73=289)	Playoff	(United States) Billy Casper, (United States) Bob Stone
3	Jun 13, 1982	Marlboro Classic	−8 (68-70-69-69=276)	4 strokes	(United States) Billy Casper, (United States) Bob Rosburg
4	Aug 15, 1982	Denver Post Champions of Golf	−5 (68-67-73-67=275)	1 stroke	(United States) Bob Goalby
5	Dec 4, 1983	Boca Grove Seniors Classic	−17 (65-69-70-67=271)	3 strokes	(United States) Billy Casper
6	Jan 22, 1984	PGA Seniors' Championship (2)	−6 (69-63-79-71=282)	2 strokes	(United States) Don January
7	Jun 24, 1984	Senior Tournament Players Championship	−12 (72-68-67-69=276)	3 strokes	(Australia) Peter Thomson
8	Dec 2, 1984	Quadel Seniors Classic	−11 (67-71-67=205)	1 stroke	(United States) Lee Elder, (United States) Orville Moody
9	Jun 23, 1985	Senior Tournament Players Championship (2)	−14 (67-71-68-68=274)	11 strokes	(United States) Miller Barber, (United States) Lee Elder, (United States) Gene Littler, (United States) Charles Owens
10	Sep 18, 1988	Crestar Classic	−13 (65-68-70=203)	4 strokes	(United States) Lee Elder, (United States) Jim Ferree, (United States) Larry Mowry

Senior PGA Tour playoff record (2–1)

No.	Year	Tournament	Opponent(s)	Result
1	1980	PGA Seniors' Championship	(United States) Paul Harney	Won with birdie on first extra hole
2	1981	U.S. Senior Open	(United States) Billy Casper, (United States) Bob Stone	Won 18-hole playoff; Palmer: E (70), Stone: +4 (74), Casper: +7 (77)
3	1984	Daytona Beach Seniors Golf Classic	(United States) Orville Moody, (United States) Dan Sikes	Moody won with birdie on second extra hole

=== Other senior wins (5) ===
- 1984 Doug Sanders Celebrity Pro-Am
- 1986 Union Mutual Classic
- 1990 Senior Skins Game
- 1992 Senior Skins Game
- 1993 Senior Skins Game

== Playoff record ==
PGA Tour of Australia playoff record (0–1)

No.	Year	Tournament	Opponent	Result
1	1978	Victorian Open	(England) Guy Wolstenholme	Lost to par on third extra hole

== Major championships ==
=== Wins (7) ===
Year	Championship	54 holes	Winning score	Margin	Runner(s)-up
1958	Masters Tournament	Tied for lead	−4 (70-73-68-73=284)	1 stroke	(United States) Doug Ford, (United States) Fred Hawkins
1960	Masters Tournament (2)	1 shot lead	−6 (67-73-72-70=282)	1 stroke	(United States) Ken Venturi
1960	U.S. Open	7 shot deficit	−4 (72-71-72-65=280)	2 strokes	(United States) Jack Nicklaus (amateur)
1961	The Open Championship	1 shot lead	−4 (70-73-69-72=284)	1 stroke	(Wales) Dai Rees
1962	Masters Tournament (3)	2 shot lead	−8 (70-66-69-75=280)	Playoff^{1}	(South Africa) Gary Player (2nd), (United States) Dow Finsterwald (3rd)
1962	The Open Championship (2)	5 shot lead	−12 (71-69-67-69=276)	6 strokes	(Australia) Kel Nagle
1964	Masters Tournament (4)	5 shot lead	−12 (69-68-69-70=276)	6 strokes	(United States) Dave Marr, (United States) Jack Nicklaus

^{1}Defeated Player (2nd) and Finsterwald (3rd) in an 18-hole playoff; Palmer (68), Player (71) and Finsterwald (77). 1st, 2nd and 3rd places awarded in this playoff.

=== Results timeline ===
Tournament	1953	1954	1955	1956	1957	1958	1959
Masters Tournament			T10	21	T7	1	3
U.S. Open	CUT	CUT	T21	7	CUT	T23	T5
The Open Championship							
PGA Championship						T40	T14

Tournament	1960	1961	1962	1963	1964	1965	1966	1967	1968	1969
Masters Tournament	1	T2	1	T9	1	T2	T4	4	CUT	27
U.S. Open	1	T14	2	T2	T5	CUT	2	2	59	T6
The Open Championship	2	1	1	T26		16	T8		T10	
PGA Championship	T7	T5	T17	T40	T2	T33	T6	T14	T2	WD

Tournament	1970	1971	1972	1973	1974	1975	1976	1977	1978	1979
Masters Tournament	T36	T18	T33	T24	T11	T13	CUT	T24	T37	CUT
U.S. Open	T54	T24	3	T4	T5	T9	T50	T19	CUT	T59
The Open Championship	12		T7	T14		T16	T55	7	T34	
PGA Championship	T2	T18	T16	CUT	T28	T33	T15	T19	CUT	CUT

Tournament	1980	1981	1982	1983	1984	1985	1986	1987	1988	1989
Masters Tournament	T24	CUT	47	T36	CUT	CUT	CUT	CUT	CUT	CUT
U.S. Open	63	CUT	CUT	T60						
The Open Championship	CUT	T23	T27	T56	CUT			CUT		CUT
PGA Championship	T72	76	CUT	T67	CUT	T65	CUT	T65	CUT	T63

Tournament	1990	1991	1992	1993	1994	1995	1996	1997	1998	1999
Masters Tournament	CUT	CUT	CUT	CUT	CUT	CUT	CUT	CUT	CUT	CUT
U.S. Open					CUT					
The Open Championship	CUT					CUT				
PGA Championship	CUT	CUT	CUT	CUT	CUT					

Tournament	2000	2001	2002	2003	2004
Masters Tournament	CUT	CUT	CUT	CUT	CUT
U.S. Open					
The Open Championship					
PGA Championship					

Win
Top 10
Did not play

CUT = missed the half-way cut
WD = withdrew
"T" = tied

=== Summary ===
Tournament	Wins	2nd	3rd	Top-5	Top-10	Top-25	Events	Cuts made
Masters Tournament	4	2	1	9	12	19	50	25
U.S. Open	1	4	1	10	13	18	32	24
The Open Championship	2	1	0	3	7	12	23	17
PGA Championship	0	3	0	4	6	13	37	24
Totals	7	10	2	26	38	62	142	90

- Most consecutive cuts made – 26 (1958 Masters – 1965 Masters)
- Longest streak of top-10s – 6 (1966 Masters – 1967 U.S. Open)

== Senior major championships ==
=== Wins (5) ===
Year	Championship	Winning score	Margin	Runner(s)-up
1980	PGA Seniors' Championship	+1 (72-69-73-75=289)	Playoff^{1}	(United States) Paul Harney
1981	U.S. Senior Open	+9 (72-76-68-73=289)	Playoff^{2}	(United States) Billy Casper, (United States) Bob Stone
1984^{a}	General Foods PGA Seniors' Championship (2)	−6 (69-63-79-71=282)	2 strokes	(United States) Don January
1984	Senior Players Championship	−12 (72-68-67-69=276)	3 strokes	(Australia) Peter Thomson
1985	Senior Players Championship (2)	−14 (67-71-68-68=274)	11 strokes	(United States) Miller Barber, (United States) Lee Elder, (United States) Gene Littler, (United States) Charles Owens

^{a} This was the January edition of the tournament.
^{1} Palmer won this with a birdie on the first playoff hole.
^{2} Won in an 18-hole playoff, Palmer shot a (70) to Stone's (74) and Casper's (77).

== U.S. national team appearances ==
Professional

- Ryder Cup: 1961 (winners), 1963 (winners, playing captain), 1965 (winners), 1967 (winners), 1971 (winners), 1973 (winners), 1975 (winners, non-playing captain)
- World Cup: 1960 (winners), 1962 (winners), 1963 (winners), 1964 (winners), 1966 (winners), 1967 (winners, individual winner)
- Presidents Cup: 1996 (winners, non-playing captain)
- UBS Cup: 2001 (winners, captain), 2002 (winners, captain), 2003 (tie, captain), 2004 (winners, captain)

== See also ==
- Arnold Palmer Cup
- Arnold Palmer (drink)
- Arnold Palmer Center for Golf History
- Arnold Palmer Tournament Golf (video game)
- List of celebrities who own wineries and vineyards
- List of golfers with most PGA Tour wins
- List of golfers with most wins in one PGA Tour event
- List of golfers with most PGA Tour Champions wins
- List of golfers with most Champions Tour major championship wins
- List of men's major championships winning golfers
- Longest PGA Tour win streaks
- Most PGA Tour wins in a year
