= Uneven Fairways =

- Theatrical release poster
- Based on: Uneven Lies, by Pete McDaniel; Forbidden Fairways, by Dr. Calvin Sinnette
- Written by: Dan Levinson; Pete McDaniel
- Directed by: Dan Levinson
- Starring: Charlie Sifford; Calvin Peete; Jim Thorpe; Pete Brown
- Narrated by: Samuel L. Jackson
- Music by: Sara Matarazzo; Stephanie Diaz-Matos
- Country of origin: United States
- Original language: English

Production
- Producers: Keith Allo; Jay Kossoff
- Cinematography: Graham Willoughby
- Editor: Mitch Gerbus
- Running time: 46 minutes
- Production company: Moxie Pictures

Original release
- Network: Golf Channel
- Release: February 11, 2009

Uneven Fairways: The Story of the Negro Leagues of Golf is a 2009 documentary film of the history of African-American golfers. The documentary premiered on the Golf Channel on February 11, 2009 and is based on the books Uneven Fairways by Pete McDaniel, and Forbidden Fairways, by Dr. Calvin Sinnette. The film was directed by Dan Levinson.

== Premise ==
"A documentary about the history of African-American golfers speaks some ... to almost officially step forward and say that if it weren't for the struggles and ... and dedication [and] great love of the game of golf, as I have said, my father."

== Contributors ==
- Charlie Sifford – 1st African-American to play a PGA tournament
- James Black – UGA/PGA player
- Pete Brown – 1st African-American to win a PGA Tour event
- Thomas Smith – UGA/NAGA player
- Arnold Palmer – PGA player
- John Shippen – archival footage
- Bill Spiller – archival footage
- Jim Thorpe – UGA/PGA/Champions Tour player
- Charles Owens – UGA/PGA/Champions Tour player
- Renee Powell – UGA/LPGA player
- Calvin Peete – PGA Tour, 12-time winner
- Ted Rhodes – archival footage
- Lee Elder – archival footage
- Leonard Jones – UGA/NAGA player
- Pete McDaniel – author, Uneven Lies
- John Merchant – USGA Executive Committee
- Albert Green – UGA/PGA player
- Billy Gardenhight – UGA/NAGA player
- Tiger Woods – PGA Tour player
- Gary Player – archival footage
- Lee Trevino – archival footage
- Ron Terry – UGA/NAGA player
- Dr. Jeffrey Sammons – NYU professor
- Lawrence Londino – filmmaker
- Darrel Knicely – UGA/NAGA player
- Jeffrey Dunovant – National Black Golf Hall of Fame
- Alton Duhon – '82 U.S. Senior Amateur champion
- Dr. Calvin Sinnette – author, Forbidden Fairways
- Bill Wright – UGA Player, '59 U.S. Public Links champion
- Adrian Stills – Q-School graduate
- Kenneth Sims – UGA/NAGA player
- Jack Nicklaus – PGA player
- Joe Louis – archival footage
- Ben Hogan – archival footage

== See also ==
- National Black Golf Hall of Fame
- United Golf Association
- Sinnette, Calvin. Forbidden Fairways at Google Books
- McDaniel, Pete. Uneven Lies at Google Books
