= Langston Golf Course =

Golf course in Washington, D.C., United States

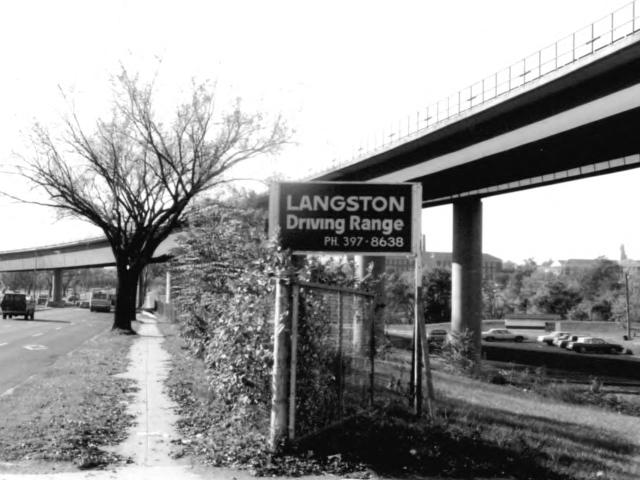
- Langston Golf Course in 1991
- Interactive map of Langston Golf Course

Club information
- Location: Washington, D.C.
- Established: 1939
- Type: Public
- Operator: National Links Trust
- Website: https://www.playdcgolf.com/langston-golf-course/

Langston Golf Course
- Designed by: George Parish
- Par: 72
- Length: 6,340 yards (5,800 m)
- Course rating: 69.5
- Langston Golf Course
- U.S. National Register of Historic Places
- U.S. Historic district
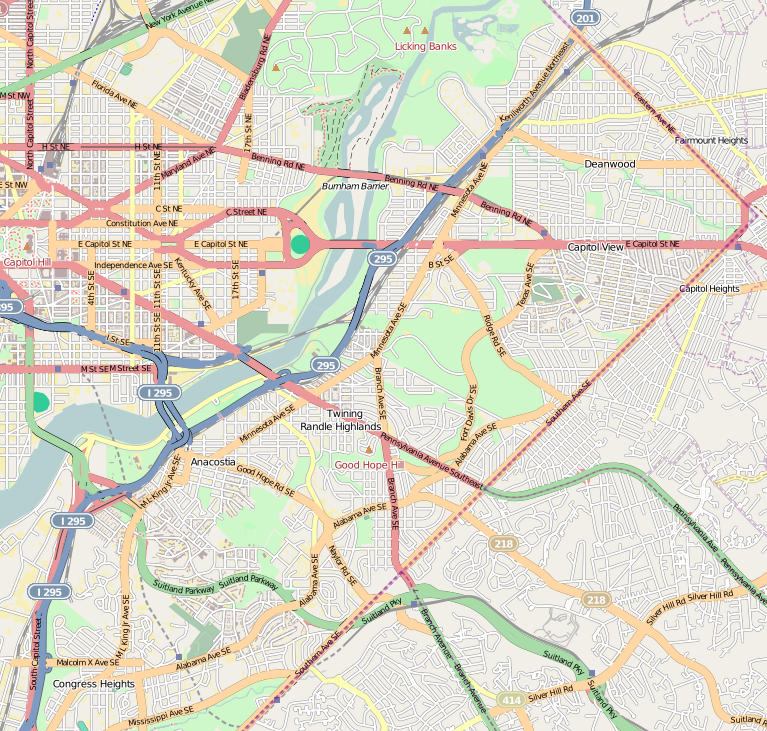
- Location within Washington, D.C.
- Location: 2600 Benning Road NE, Washington, D.C.
- Coordinates: 38°54′10″N 076°58′04″W
- Area: 145 acres (58.7 ha)
- Built: 1939
- Visitation: 25,000 (2009)
- NRHP reference No.: 91001525
- Added to NRHP: October 15, 1991

Langston Golf Course is an 18-hole golf course in Washington, D.C., established in 1939. It was named for John Mercer Langston, an African American who was the first dean of the Howard University School of Law, the first president of Virginia Normal and Collegiate Institute (now Virginia State University), and the first African American elected to the United States Congress from Virginia. It was the second racially desegregated golf course in the District of Columbia, and in 1991 its first nine holes were added to the National Register of Historic Places.

The course's official address is 2600 Benning Road NE. The course's front nine are located just south of the National Arboretum. Part of the course's back nine holes are located on Kingman Island, which is bordered by the Anacostia River in the east and Kingman Lake in the west.

Langston Golf Course should not be confused with the Anacostia Golf Course, an 18-hole golf course also located in Anacostia Park. Anacostia Golf Course was on the eastern shore of the Anacostia River. It opened in May 1933 and closed in June 1958.

== Course description ==
Langston Golf Course is an 18-hole, par 72 course. Other services offered at the course include a driving range with 50 slots, golf school, golf shop, putting green, and snack bar. There are several "junior golf" programs for children and teens, and a learning center aimed at low-income children. In 2009, about 25,000 rounds of golf were played on the course each year. Some of the more famous people who have regularly played the course include boxer Joe Louis, baseball player Maury Wills, golfer Ted Rhodes, golfer Calvin Peete, golfer Charlie Sifford, golfer Al Morton, comedian Bob Hope, President Gerald Ford, swing singer Billy Eckstine, tennis legend Althea Gibson, celebrated African American amateur golfer Ethel Funches, and football star Jim Thorpe. According to a report in the Washington Post, every great African American professional golfer in the United States has played at the course since its opening, with the exception of Tiger Woods.

Langston Golf Course is considered the best publicly owned course in the city. In 2004, a local newspaper described its driving range and practice tees as "excellent." The course is the only golf course in the city with water hazards. Holes 8 and 9 are considered quite challenging. A reporter with ESPN.com, however, evaluated the course's toughest holes differently:

...[There is] a tee shot that requires a 200-yard carry to clear Kingman Lake on the 538-yard par-5 10th hole. There is a tough, 440-yard slight dogleg par 4 at No. 12, and the No. 1 handicap hole on the course is No. 3, a 520-yard par 5 that requires one shot over a creek and an approach to a small, elevated green.

The Washington Post has characterized the first hole as "a treacherous 483-yard par 5 over water..."

In 2009, the course's manager was Jimmy Garvin. He had been the golf course's manager since 2001.

== Development ==
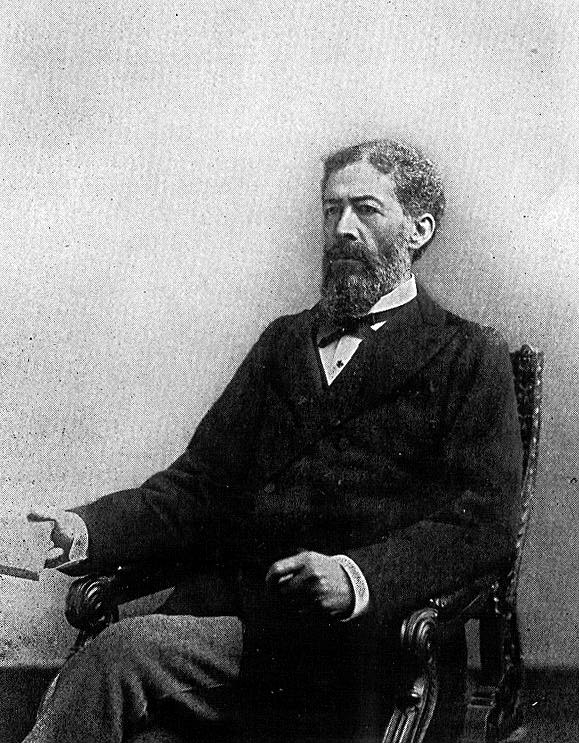
John Mercer Langston, Howard University law professor and namesake of the golf course.

The first D.C. golf course which allowed people of color to play was the municipally owned Lincoln Memorial Golf Course, which opened on June 8, 1924. The course, which had only nine holes, extended from west of the Lincoln Memorial north along the Potomac River to about 27th Street NW. In 1925, the all-black Riverside Golf Club was organized to promote play on the new course. Some members split off from this club six months after its formation to organize the Citizens Golf Club, which later changed its name to the Capital City Golf Club in 1927 and the Royal Golf Club in 1933. The Capital City/Royal club began advocating for expanded facilities for the burgeoning number of African American golfers in the city, and requested that the federal government (which operated all five golf courses in the city limits) construct a new 18-hole course for blacks to play at. In 1927, John Langford, a prominent black architect in the city, petitioned the federal government to build the course on the new Anacostia Park, which was being built on both banks of the Anacostia River from material dredged from the riverbottom. Over the next several years, African American golfers in the city and surrounding areas held rallies, attended hearings, wrote letters, and lobbied Congress and executive branch officials to build the new course in Anacostia Park.

In 1934, government officials met with representatives of the black golfing community, including members of the Royal Golf Club, and agreed to build the new course in Anacostia Park. Over the next five years, club members, golfers, and government officials worked to identify a site and construct the course. The first nine holes of Langston Golf Course were built on the north end of Kingman Island in 1939. The Civilian Conservation Corps and the Works Project Administration constructed the course. Construction began in 1936 and was nearing completion in February 1938, with an anticipated completion date of mid-1939.

In December 1938, park concessionaire Severine G. Leoffler, Sr., won the contract to administer the new Langston course. His firm had first started managing Park Service courses in the city in 1921. Loeffler, who rose from extreme poverty to own a popular local restaurant and then became a noted concessionaire for the National Park Service, administered Langston and the other city golf courses for the next four decades. The course opened at 2:00 pm on June 11, 1939. Frank T. Bartside, Acting Superintendent of the National Capital Parks, opened the course. African American golfer Clyde Martin hit the first ball on the course. (Martin became the first pro at Langston Golf Course.)

When it opened, Langston was one of only 20 golf courses in the United States open to blacks. But the course was not in good shape. Some of the greens lacked grass. An open sewer ran alongside the number three and five fairways.

The inadequate facilities at Langston led many black golfers to continue to agitate for expansion of the course. African Americans attempted to play golf at the all-white East Potomac Park Golf Course, Rock Creek Park Golf Course, and other all-white courses, but were usually prevented from doing so. Black golfers continued to lobby, rally, and testify in favor of an additional nine holes at Langston. In 1954, the Supreme Court of the United States held in Brown v. Board of Education of Topeka, 347 U.S. 483, that de jure racial segregation was a violation of the Equal Protection Clause of the Fourteenth Amendment of the United States Constitution. Golf courses in Washington, D.C., were desegregated in 1955. That same year, the back nine holes at Langston were built in Anacostia Park (on the western shore of Kingman Lake). Throughout the 1940s and 1950s, and in particular after the course's completion in 1955, Langston Golf Course was a regular stop for African Americans playing United Golf Association tournaments (because the PGA Tour was restricted to whites only).

== Management and incidents ==
=== First four decades ===
Two plane crashes occurred on Langston Golf Course in the 1940s. On December 28, 1945, a single-engine civilian light plan landed without incident on the course after weather forced the pilot down. Another light plane, this one with engine problems, was forced to land on the course in 1948.

The Leoffler company's management of the course came under scrutiny in the late 1940s. Golfers complained about the course so vehemently that U.S. Senate Subcommittee on Public Lands began an investigation and asked the Park Service to delay renewing the firm's contract. A consultant strongly criticized the firm's stewardship of the course. Nonetheless, the Loeffler company renewed its contract to manage Langston Golf Course in 1951. In the summer of 1951, Leoffler won special permission from the Office of Price Stabilization (a federal agency created to control prices during the Korean War) to raise fees at the course. The company signed a 10-year contract to manage the course in 1954.

In 1957, the course suffered a setback when its one-story, concrete storage building burned to the ground, destroying $3,000 ($23,275 in 2010 inflated-adjusted dollars) worth of maintenance equipment.

The National Capital Planning Commission proposed filling in 59 acres (24 ha) of Kingman Lake (about 50 to 60 percent of the lake's total area) in 1961 to make two small unnamed islands in the lake part of the mainland, which would add an additional 19 acres (7.7 ha) to Langston Golf Course. This plan was never acted on. In 1963, Leoffler reported that Langston Golf Course had been turning a profit under his management, even though the company had spent tens of thousands of dollars to have the greens refurbished and a miniature golf course added. Later that year, the NPS put a fence around Langston Golf Course to prevent golfers from accessing the course without paying fees and to prevent school children (some of whom had been hit by golf balls) from crossing the course during play. The course was closed for 24 hours on November 25, 1963, the day President John F. Kennedy was buried.

Langston was twice threatened with destruction in the 1960s. In 1964, Washington, D.C., officials proposed closing the first nine holes of Langston Golf Course and building the Barney Circle Freeway on the land, but the National Park Service (which owned and managed the island at the time) refused to turn over the land to the city. In 1969, the city of Washington proposed closing all of Langston Golf Course and building extensive low-income public housing on the golf course and the rest of Kingman Island. The National Park Service rejected that plan as well. Perhaps the biggest threat to the course was a study by the Park Service in the mid-1960s which called for a new federally owned golf course to be built at Oxon Cove Park and Oxon Hill Farm (just over the District line in Maryland). This study showed that D.C. golfers would be better served by the new course, and that Langston should be closed. But by 1977, the Oxon Cove course had yet to be built, and the plan died.

It is unclear what the financial status of Langston Golf Course was during its first 40 years. In 1962, the Leoffler company claimed the course had been turning a profit since 1939. In 1972, the Washington Post reported that the course grossed $100,000, while rent to the National Park Service was just $10,000. In 1975, The Leoffler family said it lost $300,000 to $500,000 in the 35 years it ran the course (about $8,600 to $14,300 a year), and Langston City Golf Corp. (which took over the lease in 1974) said it lost $50,000 on the course in just a year. (At the time, it was estimated about 125 to 200 golfers used the course each day.) In 1981, the Washington Post claimed that the course had lost money nearly every year since its opening.

=== Elder years ===
From 1978 to 1981, African American golfer Lee Elder managed Langston Golf Course. Elder had taught golf at Langston from 1960 to 1962. He met his future wife, Rose Harper, on the course. In 1970, Elder began seeking the National Park Service concession to manage Langston. He did not get the contract, but sought it again in 1972. Once more, he failed to win the concession. The Loeffler family gave up its concession contract in July 1974. A group of seven local investors formed the Langston City Golf Corp., and assumed the lease. By July 1975, the grounds were in extremely bad shape ("a virtual ruin", the press said), needing an estimated $250,000 in repairs. Unable to obtain Congressional funding for maintenance for the course and with Langston City Golf Corp. suffering from severe management problems, the National Park Service shut Langston down in July 1975. In November 1975, Elder once more sought to manage Langston Golf Course. Again, Elder was rebuffed.

Nine holes at Langston re-opened in September 1976, and the remaining nine holes on April 15, 1977. The National Park Service began looking for a new concessionaire to take over the park in September 1977.

Elder won the concession in August 1978. He immediately spent $100,000 refurbishing the course. By the end of 1981, the company said it had made another $160,000 in improvements. But in December 1981, the National Park Service closed the course after Elder's company canceled its insurance policies covering the course. The reason for the cancellation was in dispute. The National Park Service claimed that only 21,500 golfers used the course in 1980 (down from about 30,000 in 1979), and that the Elder firm had not made the improvements required by its contract. Lee and Rose Elder, however, countered that the number of golfers using the course had risen since 1978, and that the park service was refusing to make alterations to the concessions contract that were needed to keep the course profitable. The course closed in the fall of 1981, as Lee Elder Enterprises ran into financial trouble and could not keep it open. In April 1982, Lee Elder Enterprises said it owed $200,000 to creditors and was unable to pay. The D.C. court overseeing the company's financial problems said kitchen, maintenance, and sports equipment would be auctioned off to help pay the debts. With the collapse of the Elder company, the National Park Service withdrew its contract and sought a new concessionaire. But the Park Service was also seriously considering closing the course for good.

With Langston Golf Course closed for the third time in 10 years, District of Columbia highway officials argued the land should be used for a new bridge across the Anacostia River. The Barney Circle Freeway would at last be built (they claimed) to bring the Southeast Freeway north along the west bank of the Anacostia River, through Anacostia Park and Langston Golf Course, and then travel over the new bridge to connect with the Anacostia Freeway. But widespread protests from wealthy Capitol Hill residents, numerous lawsuits, and design changes caused the freeway's cost to balloon to $160 million, and it remained unbuilt by 1992. The D.C. City Council had the final say on whether to proceed with the project or not. In December 1994, the City Council bowed to neighborhood opposition and voted overwhelmingly to cancel the Barney Circle Freeway.

=== Robert F. Kennedy Memorial Stadium parking lot issue ===
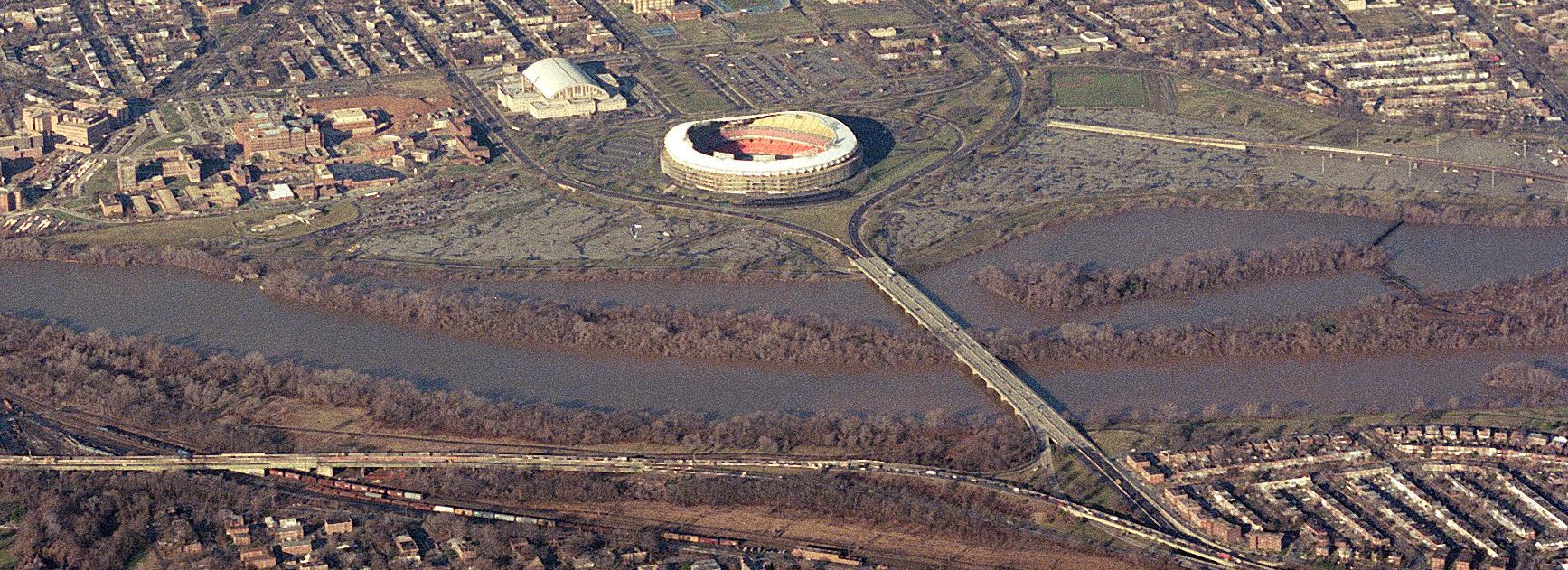
Robert F. Kennedy Memorial Stadium. On the island to the right of the bridge are the first nine holes of Langston Golf Course (just off-screen).

In April 1983, the National Park Service chose a new company, Golf Course Specialists, to manage Langston Golf Course. The company reopened the course by Memorial Day weekend. The company considered Langston the worst golf course in the entire D.C. metropolitan area when it took over. The clubhouse had chicken wire over the windows to prevent breakage, iron bars covered all windows and doors, and buildings and the course had been heavily vandalized. The greens were in very bad condition, and poor neighborhood children would sneak onto the course and steal balls in play so that they could sell them back to golfers. Over the next five years, numerous improvements were made to the course. To discourage kids from stealing golf balls, course manager Wallace "Sarge" McCombs (a former United States Army sergeant) hired many of the children to find lost balls in the traps and rough. The rough was groomed, greens resodded, security patrols increased to reduce daylight and after-hours crime, and a community outreach program implemented. Trash was cleared from the fairways and greens, water coolers were placed at each tee, portable toilets were put on the course at strategic spots, and clubhouse and course etiquette rigidly enforced. The number of golfers climbed from a low of 20,000 in 1981 to 33,000 in 1986 and a projected 40,000 in 1987. Gross revenues also rose significantly, from $70,000 in 1983 to a projected $150,000 in 1987.

These improvements did not stop development threats to the course. In 1986, D.C. officials considered but rejected Langston as a site for a new city jail. A far more serious threat came from football. In 1987, the District of Columbia began looking for a way to upgrade or replace Robert F. Kennedy Memorial Stadium so that the Washington Redskins would continue to play their games inside the city limits. In the summer of 1986, D.C. Mayor Marion Barry and Redskins owner Jack Kent Cooke agreed to dismantle Langston Golf Course and use the site for parking for a new stadium. But after protests from golfers and local residents (who did not want large amounts of traffic flowing through their neighborhood), Barry ruled out using Langston in the summer of 1987. Cooke continued to press for parking at Langston, and in August 1988 met with United States Secretary of the Interior Donald P. Hodel to demand that the National Park Service nonetheless study the feasibility of his request. Hodel agreed to do so. Under pressure, Mayor Barry agreed to consider using Langston Golf Course for parking if the federal government would turn over nearby federal property for a redesigned, new 18-hole course to replace the lost grounds. Barry even hired Lee Elder to begin designing a new course. But William Penn Mott Jr., NPS Director, said that the Park Service was strongly opposed to the use of any Anacostia Park or Langston Golf Course land for parking. D.C. officials asked the agency to reconsider its decision. Four years drifted by, and still stadium talks were ongoing. Marion Barry declined to run for re-election in 1990 after being videotaped smoking crack cocaine in a D.C. hotel. As the District still struggled to craft a deal to build a new stadium, the new Secretary of the Interior, Manuel Lujan, Jr., forced the city's new mayor, Sharon Pratt Dixon, to agree to preserve Langston Golf Course (although Lujan did agree to allow a redesign of the facility to accommodate some stadium parking). In January 1992, Mayor Dixon announced that golfers Arnold Palmer and Gary Player and businesswoman Rose Elder would design a new Langston Golf Course if the existing grounds were used for football stadium parking. By March 1992, Mayor Dixon was still proposing that parking be built on Langston Golf Course.

As the stadium talks continued, a controversy over the concessions contract at Langston erupted. Former D.C. Council chairman Arrington Dixon (and husband of Mayor Dixon) protested that the National Park Service—which was on the verge of signing a new, 15-year contract with Golf Course Specialists, Inc.—should suspend any contract negotiations until such time as the stadium issue was resolved, and that only minority-owned firms should be considered to manage the course. The new contract would commit Golf Course Specialists to pay $1.5 million to make a large number of improvements to the course, including a new clubhouse to replace the existing dilapidated structure (which had recently been closed due to health concerns). It also boosted the Park Service's share of net revenues from 2 percent to 20 percent. Secretary Lujan said he would sign the 15-year contract, but that it would include a clause terminating the agreement if a stadium deal was reached by April 3, 1992. When no deal was forthcoming by April 3, Lujan moved ahead with the new contract and the golf course's renovations, which included the major clubhouse renovation.

The District's insistence that parking be built on Langston Golf Course, however, helped clinch a stadium agreement: On December 7, 1992, Redskins owner Jack Kent Cooke agreed to build his team's new stadium next to RFK Stadium. But rising Congressional opposition to the stadium deal (primarily due to the impact it would have on local residents and its high costs) imperiled the stadium deal. Congressional opposition rose significantly after the stadium's chief proponent, D.C. City Council Chairman John A. Wilson, committed suicide on May 19, 1993. By December, Redskins owner Jack Kent Cooke abandoned the D.C. site and pledged to build his stadium in Maryland. FedExField opened in Landover, Maryland, in August 1997.

=== Golf Course Specialists years ===
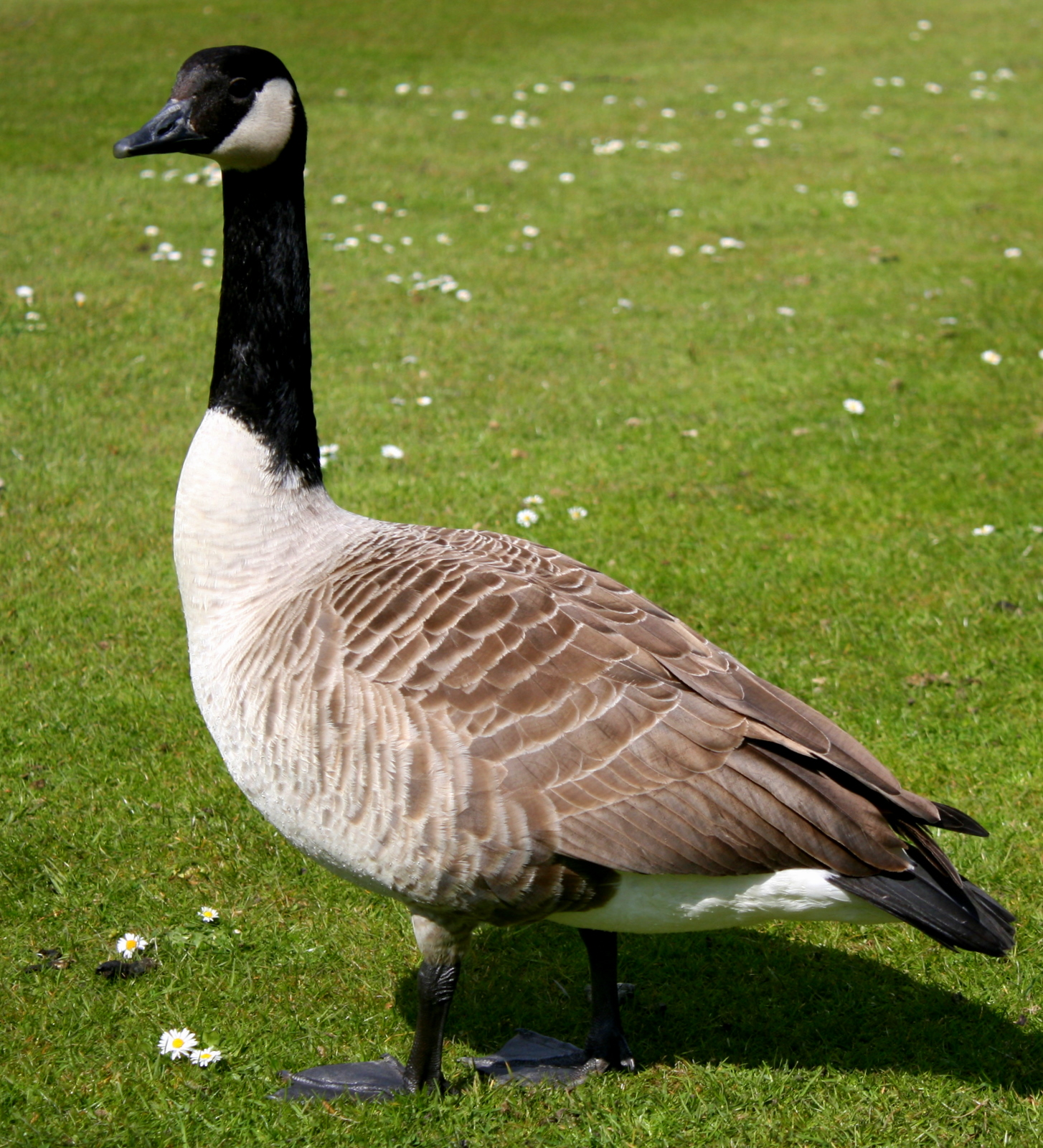
A Canada goose, one of the non-native non-migratory species which threatens Langston Golf Course and the surrounding ecosystem.

With the stadium threat to Langston Golf Course gone, a number of improvements went ahead. In 1988, the Nation's Capital Bicentennial Celebration committee said it would spearhead a $15 million fund-raising project to build a family golf center at Langston. This project, however, was not forthcoming. In 1999, heavy rains washed away some fairways and greens, exposing buried trash (such as household appliances). An $8 million project to regrade the course to improve drainage began. A year later, the concessionaire agreed to begin a series of projects to bring Langston Golf Course up to Professional Golfers Association standards. In 2002, a print of a painting by noted local artist Linwood Barnes depicting Clyde Martin taking the first drive at Langston Golf Course was hung in the clubhouse. In May 2002, Langston Golf Course became one of the first courses to host a First Tee chapter, a program designed to interest minorities and economically disadvantaged children in golf. In 2002 and 2003, Langston Golf Course opened a putt-and-chip practice area for young golfers and a four-hole course for novices. An academic resource center with computer stations, a small library, and tutoring and study programs was also opened. Students from local junior and senior high schools who study their schoolwork in the education center for an hour are awarded a free hour golf on the course. In 2002, about 200 students took advantage of the educational center. (The number had risen to 400 students by 2006.) The National Park Service and the concessionaire also established a strategic plan to raise $12 million to $17 million in public and private funds to complete the upgrade to PGA tour standards, build a new clubhouse with banquet facilities, establish a museum dedicated to African American golfers, replace the driving range, and expand the education center. In 2007, D.C. Delegate to Congress Eleanor Holmes Norton introduced the "Golf Course Preservation and Modernization Act" in Congress, legislation which would allow the National Park Service (NPS) to lease Langston and the other federally owned golf courses in the District of Columbia (rather than simply offer a concession contract). A long-term lease, Norton said, would allow the lessee to obtain high levels of capital investment funds and greatly improve the courses.

In 2006, course manager Jimmy Garvin was inducted into the African American Golfers Hall of Fame for his community outreach efforts and work at restoring and maintaining Langston Golf Course. The following year, Golf Course Specialists founder and golfer Bob Brock was inducted into the African American Golfers Hall of Fame for his work in saving Langston.

One of Langston's most difficult challenges is dealing with the giant Canada geese (Branta canadensis maxima) which inhabit the tidal marshes of Kingman Lake and the Anacostia River. Hundreds of the birds inhabit the marshes. The birds not only feed voraciously on the course's grasses, but their feces harm the greens and pose a health hazard to golfers. They also feed on and destroy the marsh plants which the National Park Service planted in Kingman Lake and the Anacostia River in the hope that these will help filter the water and restore the health of the river. In 2007, federal park officials began considering a program to cull the geese population around Langston Golf Course in an attempt to save the river, an effort opposed by some animal rights groups.

Langston Golf Course celebrated its 70th anniversary in 2009. Golfing pioneer Calvin Peete and other noted African American golfers held a celebration in the course's clubhouse on June 11, golf celebrities and city officials held a banquet in the Historical Society of Washington, D.C., City Museum, and the African American Golfers Hall of Fame awards were held in the city.

Despite the historic nature of the course and the many improvements to it in the past decades, Langston Golf Course has never hosted a PGA event or U.S. Open tournament.

=== National Links Trust ===
In 2020, the National Park Service signed an agreement with National Links Trust to operate the course along with the two other courses located in DC. At the end of 2025, the Trump administration prematurely terminated the lease agreement for this course and for the other two courses managed by the National Links Trust.

== Bibliography ==
- "A Langston Renaissance?" Washington Post. April 14, 2004.
- Addie, Bob. "Elder Asks Lease of Langston." Washington Post. November 19, 1975.
- Ahearn, Dave. "D.C. to Ask Park Service Again for Land Needed For Parking Facilities at Proposed Stadium." The Bond Buyer. December 9, 1988.
- Asher, Mark. "Cooke Instigates Park Service Study Of Langston Site." Washington Post. August 28, 1988.
- Asher, Robert L. "Arboretum, Public Golf Course Eyed for Low-Rent Housing." Washington Post. May 8, 1969.
- "Anacostia Course Will Close Sunday." Washington Post. June 7, 1958.
- Barker, Karlyn. "Clouds Gathering Over Children's Island." Washington Post. August 9, 1991.
- Barker, Karlyn. "Cooke, D.C. Near Pact On Stadium." Washington Post. March 31, 1992.
- Barker, Karlyn. "Cooke Shift Sidelines Stadium." Washington Post. April 3, 1992.
- Barker, Karlyn. "D.C. Stadium Called Boon For the Area." Washington Post. January 31, 1992.
- Barker, Karlyn. "Langston Golf Course In NE to Be Preserved." Washington Post. July 30, 1991.
- Barker, Karlyn. "Minority Protest Hits Langston Contract." Washington Post. February 20, 1992.
- Barker, Karlyn. "U.S. Gives Extension To Stadium Talks." Washington Post. March 3, 1992.
- Barker, Karlyn. "Va. Seeks Deal on Stadium After D.C. Talks Collapse." Washington Post. April 4, 1992.
- "Bowie Golf and..." Washington Post. April 14, 2004.
- Brown, Ellen. Fodor's 2000 Washington D.C. New York: Fodor's, 1999.
- Bruske, Ed. "Elder Company Unable to Pay Langston Debts." Washington Post. April 16, 1982.
- Cohn, D'Vera. "Suit Seeks to Stop D.C. Plans to Build Connector Highway." Washington Post. May 13, 1994.
- Craig, Tim and Labba-DeBose, Theola. "Council, Fenty Teams Trade Jabs In Budget Dispute." Washington Post. June 11, 2009.
- Dawkins, Marvin P. and Kinloch, Graham Charles. African American Golfers During the Jim Crow Era. Westport, Conn.: Praeger, 2000.
- "D.C. Aides Would Fill Anacostia River Flats." Washington Post. October 29, 1961.
- Denlinger, Ken. "Elder Sees a Diamond in Langston's Weedy Rough." Washington Post. August 25, 1978.
- Ducibella, Jim. "'Forbidden Fairways' Tells Story of Injustice Faced by Black Players." The Virginian-Pilot. September 16, 1998.
- Eisen, Jack. "Golf Course to Reopen." Washington Post. April 8, 1983.
- Evelyn, Douglas E.; Dickson, Paul; and Ackerman, S.J. On This Spot: Pinpointing the Past in Washington, D.C. Sterling, Va.: Capital Books, 2008.
- Fahrenthold, David A. "Anacostia's Geese May Face Death Sentence." Washington Post. July 26, 2007.
- "Fees Increased At Four Public Golf Courses." Washington Post. August 8, 1951.
- Fitzpatrick, Sandra and Goodwin, Maria R. The Guide to Black Washington: Places and Events of Historical and Cultural Significance in the Nation's Capital. New York: Hippocrene Books, 2001.
- "Flier Unhurt After Landing On Golf Course." Washington Post. December 29, 1945.
- "4 Municipal Courses To Be Closed Today." Washington Post. November 25, 1963.
- Gaines, Patrice. "Fore! Posterity." Washington Post. October 9, 1997.
- Gieser, Ben. "Morton Only Area Golfer in U.S. Open." Washington Post. June 14, 1984.
- "Golf Bill-Rescue for 3 D.C. Deteriorating Golf Courses in Norton Bill." Press release. Office of D.C. Del. Eleanor Holmes Norton. October 31, 2007.
- "Golf Course Fence Angers Neighbors." Washington Post. October 21, 1963.
- "Golf Course Operator." Washington Post. September 1, 1977.
- "Graham Gets Manager's Job At Anacostia." Washington Post. May 14, 1939.
- Hamm, Lisa M. "Barry Agrees to Study Langston Site for Stadium." Associated Press. October 12, 1988.
- Herman, Dave. "Anacostia Dedicates New 18-Hole Golf Links Today." Washington Post. May 5, 1933.
- Hodge, Paul. "Fast Commuter Link to City." Washington Post. November 2, 1982.
- Hodge, Paul. "1 of 3 Public Links in D.C. Closed." Washington Post. December 20, 1981.
- Hodge, Paul. "Smaller Public Golf Course Sought." Washington Post. September 29, 1982.
- Huff, Donald. "Closing of Langston Hurts Black Youths." Washington Post. April 17, 1976.
- Kennedy, John H. A Course of Their Own: A History of African American Golfers. Lincoln, Neb.: University of Nebraska Press, 2005.
- Kirsch, George B. Golf in America. Urbana, Ill.: University of Illinois Press, 2009.
- Knight, Althelia. "Barry May Go Along With Cooke." Washington Post. October 25, 1988.
- Kovaleski, Serge. "Costly Concessions Helped D.C. Revive Stadium Deal." Washington Post. June 6, 1993.
- Kovaleski, Serge. "D.C. Effort Derailed By Wilson's Death." Washington Post. December 12, 1993.
- Kovaleski, Serge and Beyers, Dan. "Cooke Says D.C. Talks Are Over." Washington Post. December 11, 1993.
- Lancaster, John. "Langston Golfers Hope Stadium Talks Fizzle." Washington Post. September 20, 1987.
- "Langston Golf Course to Be Repaired." Washington Post. February 23, 1999.
- "Langston Golf Links Opens Today." Washington Post. June 11, 1939.
- "Langston Golf Links Storage Shed Burns." Washington Post. August 20, 1957.
- "Langston Links 'Birdie' Is Plane Forced to Land." Washington Post. February 15, 1948.
- Lemke, Tim. "Norton Introduces Bill to Aid Courses." Washington Times. November 1, 2007.
- "Leoffler Bid For Links Is Low." Washington Post. December 22, 1935.
- "Leoffler Says Courses Paid In $1 Million." Washington Post. March 24, 1963.
- "Leoffler Signs to Run Public Golf Courses Through 1963." Washington Post. June 24, 1954.
- "Leoffler Walks Out On Golf Talk." Washington Post. January 13, 1951.
- Lewis, Nancy and Anderson, John Ward. "Officials Will List Prison Sites." Washington Post. January 26, 1986.
- Lippman, Thomas W. "D.C. Is Planning $850 Million For Maintenance, New Projects." Washington Post. January 5, 1981.
- "Links to the Past." Washington City Paper. April 19, 2002.
- Loeb, Vernon. "Norton Declares Barney Circle Freeway a Dead End." Washington Post. March 5, 1997.
- Longsworth, Amy. "Honk If You're Destroying an Ecosystem." Washington City Paper. May 19, 2006.
- Lorge, Barry. "Elder Grateful Success Didn't Come Too Fast, Too Easy." Washington Post. September 28, 1978.
- Loverro, Thom. "Langston's Youngsters Get in Game." Washington Times. August 9, 2003.
- Loverro, Thom. "On Course for Life." Washington Times. May 3, 2006.
- Lynton, Stephen J. "D.C. Plans to Link Two City Freeways." Washington Post. September 26, 1983.
- McCoubrey, Daniel. "D.C. Golfers Face Better Days." Washington Post. April 7, 1977.
- Milloy, Courtland. "For Black Women, Golf Wasn't Easy." Washington Post. April 26, 1987.
- "Muny Golf Course For Negroes Open." Washington Post. June 8, 1924.
- Nakamura, David. "Lehnhard's Eagle Leads to Victory." Washington Post. June 22, 1992.
- Neufeld, Matt. "People Sue to Stop SE Freeway Proposal." Washington Times. May 13, 1994.
- "New Golf Course Nears Completion." Washington Post. February 13, 1938.
- "Plan Disclosed For Completing Anacostia Park." Washington Post. October 19, 1961.
- Price, Tom and Price, Susan Crites. Frommer's Irreverent Guide to Washington, D.C. Hoboken, N.J.: Wiley Publishing, 2006.
- Reel, Monte. "A Golf Mecca in Need of Green." Washington Post. June 26, 2003.
- Roberts, Byron. "Park Service Promises to Preserve Langston." Washington Post. June 26, 1964.
- Robinson, Louie. "Lee Elder, Hottest Sophomore in Pro Golf." Ebony. September 1969.
- Robinson & Associates. Fort Dupont Park Historic Resources Study. Washington, D.C.: U.S. Department of the Interior, 2004.
- Rosen, Byron. "Elder to Operate Langston Course." Washington Post. August 3, 1978.
- Sanchez, Rene. "John Wilson Found Dead in Apparent Suicide." Washington Post. May 20, 1993.
- Savage, Beth L. and Shull, Carol D. African American Historic Places. Washington, D.C.: Preservation Press, 1994.
- Shapiro, Leonard. "Elder Offers Langston Bid." Washington Post. June 29, 1972.
- Shapiro, Leonard. "Ex-Cav Chitengwa Is Paid a Tribute." Washington Post. May 9, 2002.
- Shapiro, Leonard. "Langston Hopes Obama to Make Tee Time." ESPN.com. February 2, 2009. (Accessed 2010-08-17)
- Sheppard, Shrona Foreman. "Golfers to Benefit From Face Lift at Langston Course." Washington Times. April 3, 1998.
- Sherwood, Tom. "NFL Suspends Taylor For Substance Abuse." Washington Post. August 30, 1988.
- Sherwood, Tom. "Stadium Facing a New Hurdle." Washington Post. December 6, 1988.
- Snider, Rick. "Stalled Stadium Talks Get 30-Day Extension." Washington Times. March 3, 1992.
- Solomon, George. "Cooke Likes Open-Air Stadium At Langston Site." Washington Post. July 14, 1988.
- Spencer, Duncan. "Hill Faces Another Classic Battle Over a Freeway." Roll Call. June 18, 1992.
- Spencer, Duncan. "Road Project Hits Legal Dead End." Roll Call. February 3, 1994.
- Surkiewicz, Joe; Sehlinger, Bob; and Zibart, Eve. The Unofficial Guide to Washington, D.C. New York: Wiley Publishing, 2002.
- Svrluga, Barry. "With Tiger, It's Reachable." Washington Post. July 2, 2009.
- Thompson, John. National Geographic Traveler: Washington, D.C. Washington, D.C.: National Geographic, 2008.
- Toth, Gabe. "Golf 'Hall' Honors Taos Resident." Taos News. July 12, 2007.
- "Two New Golf Links to Open This Summer." Washington Post. May 13, 1924.
- Walsh, Jack. "Expert Finds Faulty Golf Courses Here." Washington Post. April 3, 1949.
- Weil, Martin, and Wilgoren, Debbi. "Cooke, D.C. Reach Agreement on New Stadium." Washington Post. December 8, 1992.
- Wheeler, Linda. "D.C. Freeway in Limbo." Washington Post. August 21, 1995.
- Wheeler, Linda. "D.C. to Party, Capitalize on Anniversary." Washington Post. March 24, 2000.
- Whittlesey, Merrell W. "'New Deal' Is Planned For Golfers." Washington Post. December 31, 1938.
