= Bill Powell (golf) =

American entrepreneur and golf course architect (1916–2009)

- Born: William James Powell; November 22, 1916; Greenville, Alabama, U.S.
- Died: December 31, 2009 (aged 93); Canton, Ohio, U.S.
- Occupations: businessman, golf course owner, and entrepreneur
- Years active: 1948–2009
- Spouse(s): Marcella, ?-1996 (her death)
- Children: Billy (deceased), Renee, Lawrence

William James Powell (November 22, 1916 – December 31, 2009) was an American businessman, entrepreneur, and pioneering golf course owner who designed the Clearview Golf Club, the first integrated golf course, as well as the first to cater to African-American golfers. He was also the first African American to design, construct and own a professional golf course in the United States. Powell was fond of saying "The only color that matters is the color of the greens".

== Biography ==
Powell was the grandson of Alabama slaves and was born in Greenville, Alabama. During his youth, Powell moved with his family to Minerva, Ohio. In high school there, he played golf and football. Later, at the state's historically African-American Wilberforce University, he played on the golf team.

After serving in the United States Army Air Forces in World War II in England, he returned to the Canton, Ohio-area near Minerva in 1946, and began work first as a janitor and later as a security guard for the Timken bearing and steel company. Due to racial segregation, he was banned from all-white public golf courses and was rejected for a bank loan to try to build his own. With financing from two African-American doctors and a loan from his brother, Powell bought a 78-acre (320,000 m^{2}) dairy farm in East Canton, Ohio, and with his wife, Marcella, did most of the landscaping by hand. Two years later, in 1948, he opened the integrated Clearview Golf Club. In 1978, he expanded the course to 18 holes and earned a national-historic-site designation in 2001.

As of the 2000s (decade), Clearview was the only course in the United States designed, constructed, owned and operated by an African American.

Powell died in Canton, Ohio, on New Year's Eve, 2009, following complications from a stroke.

== Awards and honors ==
* 1996 - Powell was inducted into the National Black Golf Hall of Fame. He also received honorary Doctor of Humane Letters degrees from his alma mater, and from Baldwin-Wallace College in Berea, Ohio.

* 2001 - The United States Department of the Interior added Clearview Golf Course to the National Register of Historic Places.

* 2009 - Powell was named the recipient of the 2009 PGA Distinguished Service Award by the Professional Golfers' Association of America and was honored in conjunction with the 91st PGA Championship.

* 2019 - The Powell family was named the recipient of the 2019 Old Tom Morris Award by the Golf Course Superintendents Association of America and was honored at the 2019 Golf Industry Show.

== Family info and personal ==
Powell's daughter, Renee Powell, who is a veteran professional golfer herself, was the second black golfer to play on the LPGA Tour, after golfer and tennis star Althea Gibson. Now serving as Clearview's Head Golf Professional, Renee, who was taught to play golf at a young age by her father, is also known as one of the top golf instructors in the U.S. His son, Lawrence "Larry" Powell, presently serves as Clearview's Course Superintendent. His work has been recognized by both NASA and the Golf Course Superintendents Association of America.

== See also ==
- Military history of African Americans
