= Ethel Funches =

American amateur golfer

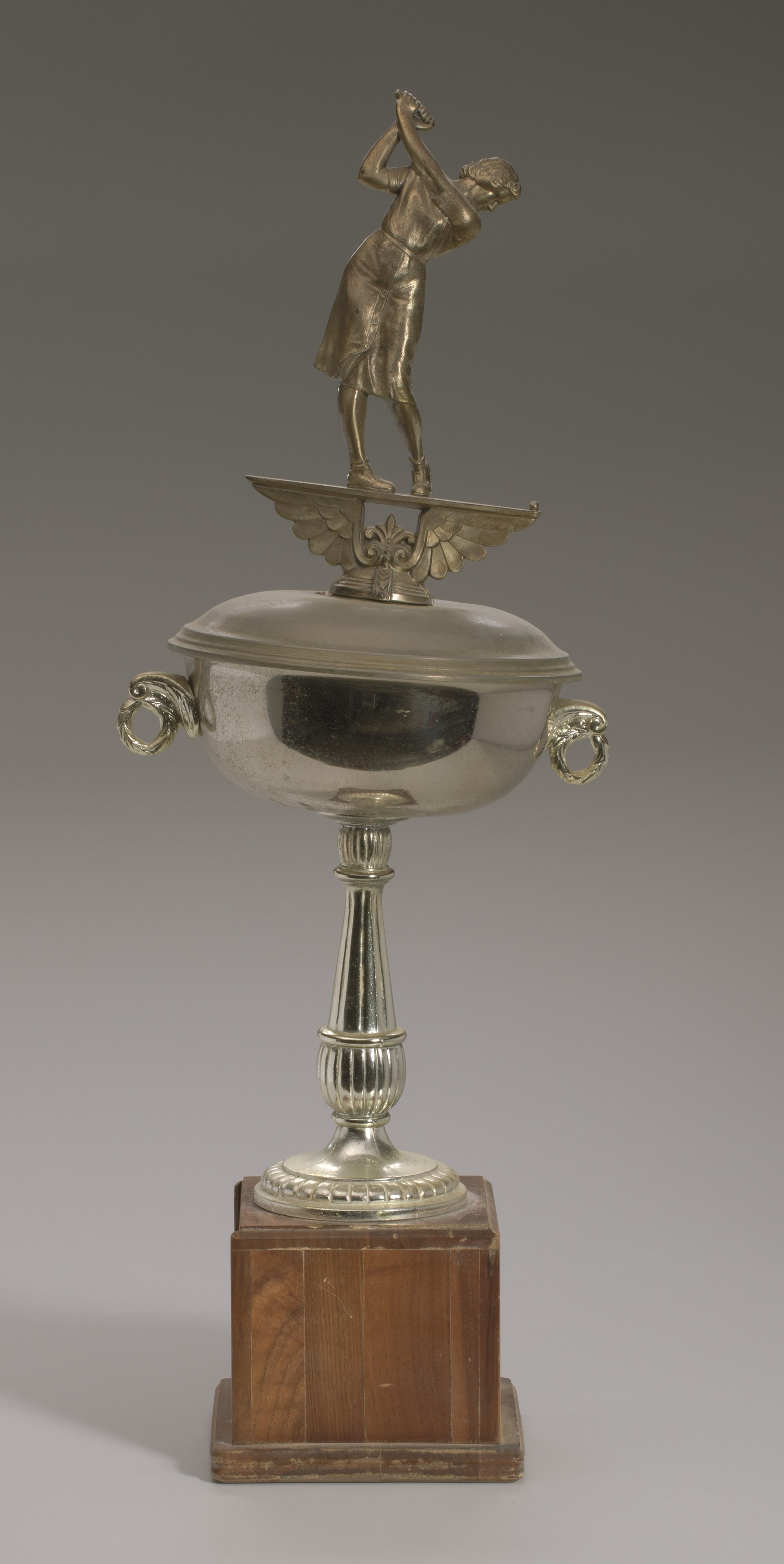
- United Golf Association trophy won by Funches in 1968

Personal information
- Full name: Ethel Powers Funches
- Nationality: United States
- Born: August 29, 1913 Owens, South Carolina, U.S.
- Died: January 6, 2010 (aged 96) Washington, D.C., U.S.
- Spouse: Eugene Funches

Career
- Sport: Golf
- Status: Amateur

Number of wins by tour
- Major tour wins: 7

Achievements and awards
- National Afro-American Golfers Hall of Fame: 1969

Ethel Funches (1913–2010) was a champion amateur golfer from 1950 to 1980 who won a number of local, regional and national titles, including seven titles at the United Golfers Association National Women's Open, fourteen wins at the Wake-Robin Golf Club Championships and over 100 local and regional titles and trophies.

== Early life ==
Funches was born on August 29, 1913, in Owens, South Carolina. She moved to Washington, D.C., during the Great Depression in 1932. Funches husband, Eugene Funches, taught her to play golf after the couple moved to Washington, D.C. Golf provided a social and competitive outlet for Funches and she devoted much of her free time honing her skills. During the day Funches was a cafeteria manager at Dunbar High School in the District of Columbia area until her retirement in 1970.

== Career ==
Funches joined the Wake-Robin Golf Club (WRGC) in 1943. The club was formed seven years earlier in the home of Helen Webb Harris along with 13 other founding members and is the oldest black women's golf club in the United States.

At the time there was only one public, nine-hole course that was not segregated. The members of the club along with their husbands were able to convince the Federal Department of the Interior to create the Langston Golf Course, the second racially desegregated golf course in the District. The courses were not the only segregated aspect of golfing, the Professional Golfers' Association of America (PGA) had a standing by-law until the 1960s that prohibited African Americans from joining. In response, African American golfers established the United Golf Association (UGA) back in the 1920s. The UGA Championships were one of many competitions Funches dominated at. Funches became the only player to win 7 UGA Championships. To put this into perspective winning the UGA National Open Women's Championship was equivalent to winning the United States Golf Association Women's Open Championship, for a golfer to win one of these prestigious competitions is a sign of talent and a true accomplishment. To win more than once was unheard of since each year the event was held at a different course in a different city. Funches proved her golf prowess by not only winning 7 within a ten-year span, but with a consecutive reign in 1959 and 1960.

Throughout her competitive years Funches faced many competitors and had a prolonged rivalry with fellow amateur golfer Ann Gregory. In 1957 Funches and Gregory both competed in the UGA National Open Championships, which was held in the Washington, D.C., area. Funches was playing on familiar territory and was confident she could take home the title. Instead, Gregory won her third Open Championship and Funches placed second. Another well-known competitor Funches teed off against was the tennis champion Althea Gibson in 1961 during the quarterfinals of the black women's golf national Championship

== Major wins ==
Wake Robin Golf Club Championships
1952
1953
1954
1955
1957
1958
1959
1961
1962
1964
1969
1971
1973
1978

^{Red and grey indicate consecutive wins.}

The United Golf Association was established in 1928 as a tour for players that were excluded from the Professional Golfers' Association of America. When Funches first attempted the UGA National Open Women's Championship in 1955, she was competing against the best women players since 1946, Funches still managed to place second. In 1957, Funches again had her hopes of the title dashed when she lost to Ann Gregory and placed second. After another disappointing loss at the 1958 Open in Pittsburg, Funches was able to rally and break through as the 1959 UGA National Open Women's Champion. Funches won her second and consecutive Open Championship in 1960, proving that she was not a one-time champion.

It was not until 1963 that she was able to win back the title after being ousted by her close friend Vernice Turner in 1961 and an unknown amateur golfer Carrie Jones in 1962. Funches third UGA Championship win appeared to be the height of her career. The losses motivated her to win four additional, three of which were consecutive, Open Championships between 1967 and 1973. Funches bested all of the UGA National Open Championship, including Men's and Women's Amateur and Men's Professional, records with a total 7 Championship titles.

United Golfers Association National Women's Open
1959
1960
1963
1967
1968
1969
1973

^{Red indicates consecutive wins.}

=== Other wins ===
Funches also won multiple championship trophies and titles in:

- D.C. Recreation Open*

Eastern Golf Association Open

- Pennsylvania State Open
- Howard University "H" Club Tourney
- New Jersey State Open
- Maryland State Open
- Green's Ladies Annual
- Ballentine's 3-Ring Golf Classic
- Rheingold's Tournament of Champions
