= Rogers Park, Tampa =

Golf course in Tampa, Florida

Coordinates: 28°01′20″N 82°25′25″W

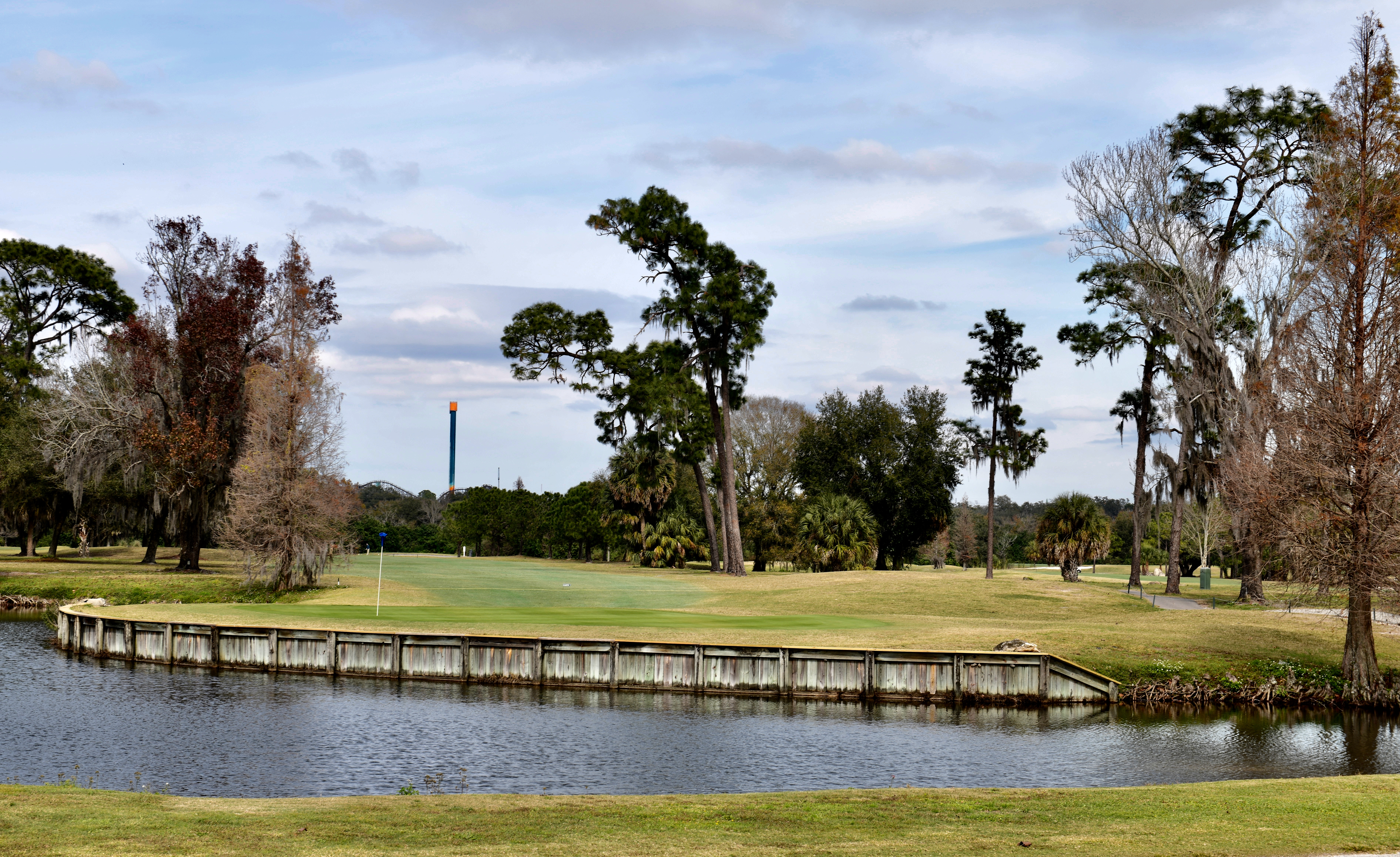
18th Green

Rogers Park Golf Course is a historic public 18-hole golf course in Tampa, Florida. Land for the park was acquired by the City of Tampa in 1947 and was used for picnics and games by black residents during the era of racial segregation in the United States. Construction of the course was led by Willie Black and began in 1948 on part of the Rogers Park complex. It was completed in 1952. Rogers Park was the only course available to Tampa's black residents.

Located along the Hillsborough River, Rogers Park is spread across 160 acres. The park was created in 1952 by Tampa businessman and philanthropist Garfield Devoe Rogers (G. D. Rogers) for whom it is named. On Nov. 10, 1949, The Tampa Tribune reported that a new city "Negro Park" near the waterworks had just been started and the land was being cleared. The approximate 30 acres of land was purchased by the City of Tampa from Tampa Electric Company. Two parcels of land with houses on them within the park were still owned by private citizens and at the time had no intention of selling out. Parks department crews were busy clearing the land at all areas around those properties. Mayor Hixon was quoted in the article: "The Negroes of Tampa have long needed a place where they could go for recreation, and that's the best spot for such a place. We'll keep right on going because the city repeatedly has offered more money for those two pieces of property than they are worth." (Two photos show the land and the two houses.)

Garfield Devoe Rogers Sr. died on Feb. 22, 1951, according to his obituary in the Tampa Tribune and Tampa Times, he was 66. The new city park was named in honor of Rogers by a committee appointed by Mayor Hixon on June 7, 1951. Reported by the Tampa Tribune on Jun 8, 1951, Lee Davis, head of the committee, stated "...In the selection of the name of G. D. Rogers for the park, the committee was cognizant and appreciative of the many things that had been accomplished in the Tampa Bay area during Rogers' life of service." A June 18, 1951 Tampa Tribune article reported that the park was dedicated by Mayor Hixon and several speakers on Jun 17, 1951. The principal speaker was to be Dr. Mary McLeod Bethune, but she was delayed en route to Tampa and failed to arrive in time for the ceremony. Until the time of his death, G. D. Rogers was president of the Central Life Insurance Co. of Florida.

In a Jan. 2, 1954 Tampa Tribune article about the City of Tampa's construction projects, it lists the opening of a 9-hole golf course at Rogers Park as one of its achievements. On Feb. 19, 1954, Superintendent of City Parks Ben Sanborn was given the Tampa Junior Chamber of Commerce Award of "Good Government" for his efforts in beautifying Tampa, which was presented to those public officials on the basis of accomplishments over a period of years. Among his department's efforts was said "Sanborn developed Rogers Park for Negroes, including the nine-hole golf course at this location." In Jan. 1955, Sanborn announced plans for the city parks department to increase the 9-hole Rogers Park course to 18 holes. The 9-hole course had been open for 18 months at the time, putting the opening at around May 1952.

Tampa Mayor Curtis Hixon gave permission to a group of caddies from Palma Ceia Country Club to build a nine-hole golf course at the site and the first Head Golf Professional, Willie Black, worked with volunteers clear trees and landscape. In 1976 the City of Tampa turned over management rights to the then-newly formed Tampa Sports Authority and a $400,000 renovation project with an expansion and new irrigation system was implemented. In 2000 an additional renovation replaced the irrigation system, rebuilt the greens to USGA specifications, and reshaped parts of the course. In 2001 a maintenance facility was added and in 2002 a clubhouse was built.

African-American golfers who played the course included Jimmy Taylor, Charles Owens, Ted Rhodes, Gordon Chavis, Charlie Sifford, Dick Thomas and Cliff Harrington. In 1963 Taylor helped establish the Mid Winter Classic as part of the United Golfers Association, established in 1925 and commonly referred to as the "Chitlin Circuit". The competition is believed to have lasted until the late '70s or early '80s before being revived in 2010.

== Willie Black ==
Willie Black was an African American golf caddy, golfer, and the first head golf professional at Rogers Park, Tampa, a course he constructed with volunteers to serve African-Americans in Tampa, Florida during racial segregation. Rogers Park is located at 7911 Willie Black Drive. He was inducted into the National Black Golf Hall of Fame.

Caddies from all over Tampa heard about Willie Black's course, the second in Florida to permit African-Americans after one was created in Miami Springs.
