= Funches =

Funches is a surname. Notable people with the surname include:

- Ethel Funches (1913–2010), American golfer
- Ron Funches (born 1983), American comedian and actor
