= Cobbs Creek Golf Course =

Golf course in Philadelphia, Pennsylvania

- Interactive map of Cobbs Creek Golf Course
- 39.967°N 75.265°W

Club information
- Location: Philadelphia, Pennsylvania, U.S.
- Established: 1916 - Cobbs Creek 'Olde Course'; 1929 - Karakung Course
- Type: Public
- Total holes: 18 (Cobbs Creek), 9 (Karakung)

Cobbs Creek 'Olde Course'
- Designed by: Hugh Irvine Wilson

Karakung Course
- Designed by: Alan P. Corson and A. H. Smith

Cobbs Creek Golf Course, established in 1916, is a 340-acre public, city-owned golf course in Philadelphia, Pennsylvania. It was one of the first courses in the area to welcome golfers of all races, ethnicities, and genders.

The course consists of the 'Olde Course' and the adjoining Karakung Course which was added in 1929.

== History ==
Cobbs Creek Golf Course was designed by Hugh Wilson with contributions from A. W. Tillinghast, George C. Thomas Jr., William Flynn, George Crump, and William Fownes. Wilson also designed nearby Merion Golf Club's east course.

Charlie Sifford, the first Black golfer to play in a PGA tour event, learned to play at the course.

The course hosted the United States Public Links championship (1928), the United Golfers Association Championship for Black golfers, and two PGA tour events (1950s).

In the 1950s and 60s, part of the course was used by the military as an anti-aircraft battery.

The course is situated between Philadelphia's Overbrook and Overbrook Park neighborhoods.

== Restoration ==
The course's clubhouse was destroyed by a fire in 2016. In 2019, the city's lease with the operating contractor expired and the course closed. The Cobbs Creek Foundation was formed soon after and was granted a 70-year lease.

The foundation is facilitating a $100 million renovation of the course which will restore the 18-hole ‘Olde Course’ and revive its adjoining facility, Karakung Golf Course, into a nine-hole course. Jim Wagner of Gil Hanse and Hanse Golf Design is leading the design team.

Tiger Woods, through the TGR Foundation, provided funding for an on-site TGR learning lab.

The restoration is being overseen by the U.S. Environmental Protection Agency and the U.S. Army Corps of Engineers.

== Awards ==
The course was inducted into the National Black Golf Hall of Fame in 2021.
