= Echo Lake Country Club =

Country club in Westfield, New Jersey, US

Coordinates: 40.67276°N 74.33959°W

- Interactive map of Echo Lake Country Club

Club information
- Location: Westfield, New Jersey, U.S.
- Established: 1899
- Type: Private
- Tota holes: 18
- Website: http://www.echolakecc.org
- Designed by: Donald Ross
- Par: 71
- Length: 7,116 yards
- Course rating: 74.3 (Championship); 73.2 (Jones); 71.5 (Echo Lake); 69.5 (Ross); 67.4 (White); 71.7 (Faxon)
- Slope rating: 132 (Championship); 130 (Jones); 128 (Echo Lake); 124 (Ross); 120 (White); 127 (Faxon)
- Course record: 63

Echo Lake Country Club is a private, member-owned country club located in Westfield, New Jersey. The club was founded in 1899, and the golf course was designed by Donald Ross in 1913.

== History ==
The club was founded as the Cranford Golf Club in 1899, and a 9-hole golf course was designed by Willie Dunn on Lincoln Avenue in Cranford, New Jersey. Cranford business owners and trading-stamp magnates Thomas Sperry and William Miller Sperry were executives of the Cranford Golf Club on Lincoln Avenue, formerly known as Westfield Avenue and part of the Old York Road. The club's 19th-century grounds off Lincoln Avenue were a former estate said to have supplied lumber to build the USS Constitution ("Old Ironsides") in the 1700s. The grounds also included the largest sour gum ever recorded in the Northeastern states, known as the Cranford Pepperidge Tree or "Old Peppy."

Young men from the Cranford club went on to fame --- Max Marston of Central Avenue in Cranford, New Jersey won the National Amateur Golf Association Championship, and Dean Mathey won the National Clay Court Tennis Doubles Championship twice.

In 1912, the Cranford Golf Club purchased the Harper Farm in Westfield, New Jersey, and engaged Donald Ross to design the current course, which was completed in 1913. The clubhouse was built on a high bluff overlooking Echo Lake.

In 1921, the Cranford Golf Club and the Westfield Golf Club merged, choosing the name Echo Lake Country Club to reflect both the site, along the upper reaches of the Rahway River Parkway, and the broad country club activities offered.

== Tournaments ==
=== National Championships ===
The club has hosted three national championships conducted by the United States Golf Association:

Year	Championship	Winner	Score	Runner-up	Semi-Finalists	Notes
1994	U.S. Junior Amateur	(South Korea) Terry Noe	2 up	(United States) Andy Barnes	(United States) Charles Howell III (Puerto Rico) Mauricio Muniz	
2002	U.S. Girls' Junior	(South Korea) Inbee Park	4 & 3	(United States) Jenny Tangtiphaiboontana	(United States) Allison Martin (United States) Hannah Jun	
2025	U.S. Amateur Four-Ball	(United States) Will Hartman & (United States) Tyler Mawhinney	3 & 1	(United States) Evan Beck & (United States) Dan Walters	(United States) Charlie Forster & (United States) Steen Zeman (England) Carson Looney & (United States) Hunter Powell	

=== PGA Tour Events ===
Year	Event	Winner	Score	Runners-up	Notes
1934	Metropolitan Open	(United States) Paul Runyan	−1	(United States) Walter Hagen (United States) Wiffy Cox	
