= John F. Merchant =

American attorney, politician and activist

- Born: February 2, 1933; Greenwich, Connecticut
- Died: March 5, 2020 (aged 87); Bridgeport, Connecticut
- Occupations: Lawyer, activist, golfer and politician

John F. Merchant (February 2, 1933 – March 5, 2020) was an American lawyer, activist, golfer and politician. He served as the first Black member of the USGA Executive Committee from 1992 to 1995 and was the Democratic nominee for Connecticut State Treasurer in 1970.

== Early life and education ==
Merchant was born in on February 2, 1933, in Greenwich, Connecticut, in the Chickahominy neighborhood. His parents, Garrett McKinley and Essie (née Louise) Merchant, worked in domestic jobs for the town's wealthy residents.

Merchant attended Greenwich public schools, after which he attended the University of Connecticut for two years before transferring and earning a bachelor's degree at Virginia Union University. He then pursued a law degree, becoming the first African-American graduate of the University of Virginia School of Law in 1958.

== Career ==
After graduating from law school, Merchant served in the United States Navy, where he achieved the rank of lieutenant commander, before returning home to Greenwich. Refused from law firms in town due to racial discrimination, he moved to Bridgeport and founded Connecticut's first black law firm with future Connecticut Superior Court judges L. Scott Melville and E. Eugene Spear. Merchant practiced civil and criminal law for over 50 years. He served as community liaison for the Action for Bridgeport Community Development, now known as the Alliance for Community Empowerment. Merchant also taught at local colleges, teaching race relations at Fairfield University and business law at Norwalk Community College, now Connecticut State Community College Norwalk. In 1970, he was the Democratic Party nominee for Connecticut State Treasurer in the general election, eventually being defeated by Robert I. Berdon.

Golf, a pastime Merchant picked up in the Navy, became one of his life's great endeavors. He was very active at local country clubs, winning the club championship at Rolling Hills Country Club in Wilton, Connecticut in 1980 and 1983. It was at these clubs Merchant befriended fellow local lawyer S. Giles Payne, who was active in the USGA in multiple capacities. After the 1990 racial discrimination scandal at Shoal Creek Club, Payne recommended Merchant for a seat on the USGA Executive Committee, and in 1992, Merchant was appointed, becoming the first Black member of the body. Chief among his accomplishments during his tenure was the creation of what would eventually become the First Tee program, which sought to introduce golf to young people and diversify the field. In 1995, Merchant stepped down to become the first executive director of the National Minority Golf Foundation.

In 1995, Merchant began representing then-youth amateur golf sensation Tiger Woods at the request of his father, Earl Woods. Merchant first saw Tiger in a 1993 junior tournament in Oregon and grew to know him and Earl, with Tiger even doing two clinics at Brooklawn Country Club in Fairfield, Connecticut, as a favor of Earl to Merchant. But in 1996, after lining up endorsement deals for Tiger with Nike, Inc. and Titleist worth up to $60 million, Earl fired Merchant. As to the cause of the firing, in a 2010 interview, Merchant said, "Earl fired me. I have no idea why... lawyers get fired by their clients all the time."

In 1987, Merchant created the Walter N. Ridley Scholarship Fund to assist African-American students at the University of Virginia.

In 2010, Merchant was inducted into the National Black Golf Hall of Fame.

== Personal life and death ==
Merchant had one daughter, Susan.

In his later years, he resided in Newtown, Connecticut. He died on March 5, 2020, at the age of 87, in Bridgeport, Connecticut.
