= Ann Gregory =

African-American amateur golfer

Personal information
- Nationality: United States
- Born: July 25, 1912 Aberdeen, Mississippi, U.S.
- Died: February 5, 1990 (aged 77) Gary, Indiana, U.S.
- Spouse: Leroy Percy Gregory

Career
- Sport: Golf
- Status: Amateur

Achievements and awards
- United Golf Association: 1966
- African American Golfers Hall of Fame: 2006
- National African American Golfers Hall of Fame: 2011
- National Black Golf Hall of Fame: 2012

Ann Gregory (July 25, 1912 – February 5, 1990) was an African-American amateur golfer. Black newspapers had called her "The Queen of Negro Women's Golf." As stated in Arthur Ashe's book, Hard Road to Glory, many observers called Gregory the best African-American female golfer of the 20th century.

Gregory learned to play golf while her husband was away serving in the Navy during World War II. In 1948 Gregory won a tournament in Kankakee, Illinois, during which she defeated former United Golf Association champions Lucy Mitchell, Cleo Ball, and Geneva Wilson. In 1950 she won the Sixth City Open in Cleveland, the Midwest Amateur, and the United Golf Association's national tournament, as well as tying the women's course record at a Flint, Michigan tournament. On September 17, 1956, she began competing in the U.S. Women's Amateur Championship, thus becoming the first African-American woman to play in a national championship conducted by the United States Golf Association.

Because she was African-American, Gregory was denied entry into the player's banquet at Congressional Country Club in Bethesda at the conclusion of the U.S. Women's Amateur in 1959. Also, in Gary, Indiana, African-Americans were banned from playing the South Gleason Park Golf Course. However, in the early 1960s, Gregory played that course, stating, "My tax dollars are taking care of the big course and there's no way you can bar me from it." She was followed by other African-Americans who played the course soon after her, and the ban was ended. In 1963, Gregory was mistaken as a maid by Polly Riley, another contestant at the Women's Amateur in Williamstown, Massachusetts.

In 1971, Gregory was runner-up at the USGA Senior Women's Amateur, making her the first African-American to finish as runner-up in a USGA women's competition.

In 1989, at age 76 and competing against a field of 50 women, she won the gold medal in the U.S. National Senior Olympics, beating her competitors by 44 strokes.

In all, during her career, Gregory won nearly 300 tournaments.

Gregory was also the first African-American appointed to the Gary [Indiana] Public Library Board, which occurred in 1954.

A granite marker in Gregory's memory stands at the sixth hole of the South Gleason Park Golf Course in Gary, Indiana. She was inducted into the United Golf Association Hall of Fame in 1966, the African American Golfers Hall of Fame in 2006, the National African American Golfers Hall of Fame in 2011, and the National Black Golf Hall of Fame in 2012.

In 2000, the Urban Chamber of Commerce of Las Vegas began the Ann Gregory Memorial Scholarship Golf Tournament, which lasted seven years.
