= Clearview Golf Club =

- U.S. National Register of Historic Places
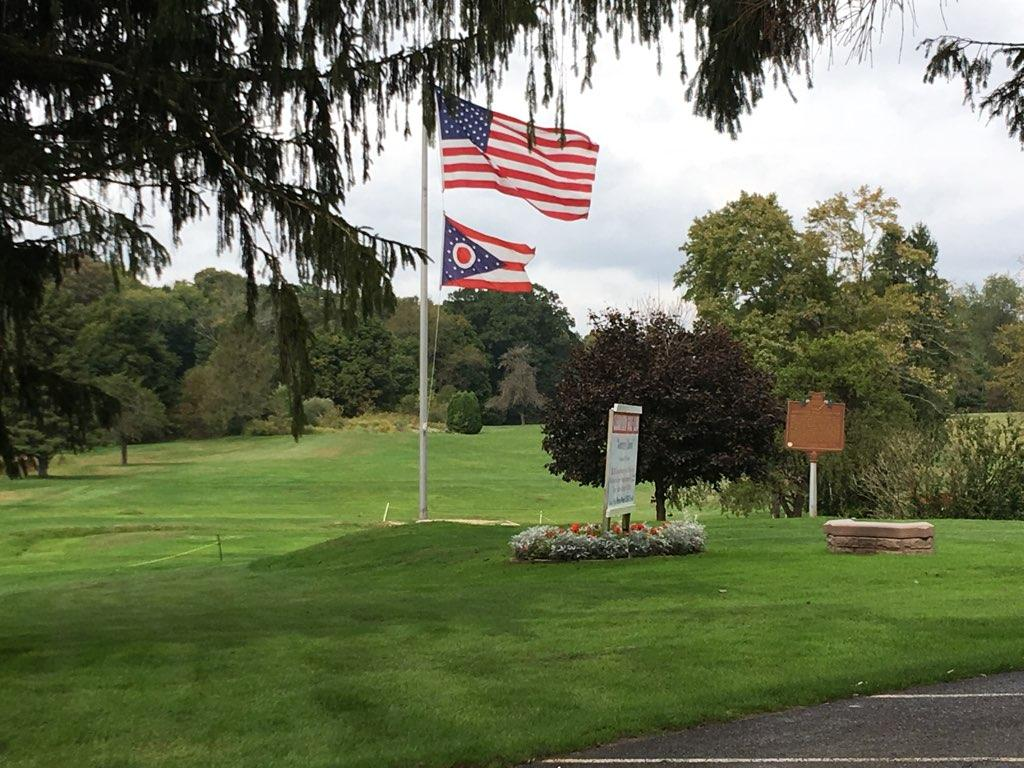
- Golf course greens

- Location within Ohio Location within the United States
- Location: 8410 Lincoln St SE East Canton, Ohio
- Coordinates: 40°46′19″N 81°14′51″W
- Area: 5 acres (2.0 ha)
- Built: 1948
- Architect: Bill Powell
- NRHP reference No.: 01000056
- Added to NRHP: February 16, 2001

The Clearview Golf Club (also Clearview Golf Course) was the first golf course in the United States to be built, owned, and operated by an African American. The club was started in 1946, with Bill Powell purchasing the land and working on it in his spare time. It opened to the public and to all races in April 1948. The club, which is located outside of East Canton, Ohio, was listed on the National Register of Historic Places in 2001. Powell's daughter, Renee Powell, who learned to play on Clearview, went on to become the second black woman to play on the LPGA tour.

== About ==
The Clearview Golf Club is currently the only golf course in the United States that was designed, built, managed, and owned entirely by African Americans. It is one of 13 black-owned or operated golf courses in the US.

The club is located two miles outside of East Canton, Ohio. It is a par-72 course. It has 18 holes and covers around 130 acres of land.

The club is named "Clearview" because Bill Powell, the designer and first owner, wanted a place that "would represent his 'clear view' of what the game should be about: access for all." The club is currently managed by Bill's children, Larry Powell and Renee Powell.

== History ==
The Clearview Golf Club was designed by Bill Powell and was begun in East Canton, Ohio in 1946. As an African American, Powell had faced prejudice when attempting to join other golf clubs in the United States, so he chose to build his own. First, Powell tried to get a GI loan, but was turned down. Powell obtained financial support for his effort to build the golf club from two black physicians and from his brother who took out a second mortgage. With this support, he was able to purchase a 78-acre dairy farm.

Powell moved his family to a house on the golf course. At the time, he was working as a security guard and in his spare time, he started converting the farm into a golf course. He worked on the course during the day, growing grass and clearing the land by hand while at night, he worked at Timken. He completed the first nine holes by 1948. The club opened in April that same year, with Powell's wife, Marcella, helping out. His young daughter, Renee Powell, began playing golf on the course shortly after it first opened at the age of 3. Renee would go on to become the second black woman to play on the LPGA tour.

Once the club was open, it welcomed everyone, regardless of race. The club did experience some problems with vandalism and community hostility, but these did not impair the club's success. A member of the Ku Klux Klan golfed his course, but Powell only told his daughter, Renee, about the incident. Racists called the club the "nigger nine." But Powell didn't care. He said, "I wanted this to be a place where race didn't matter; where the only thing that matters is the game of golf."

Powell expanded the club to eighteen holes in 1978. In 1995, Renee took over as head golf professional at Clearview. Her father, Bill, never saw a profit while running the course. Like her father and her brother, Larry, Renee didn't draw a salary for working at the club. Renovations sponsored by the PGA of America took place in 1999.

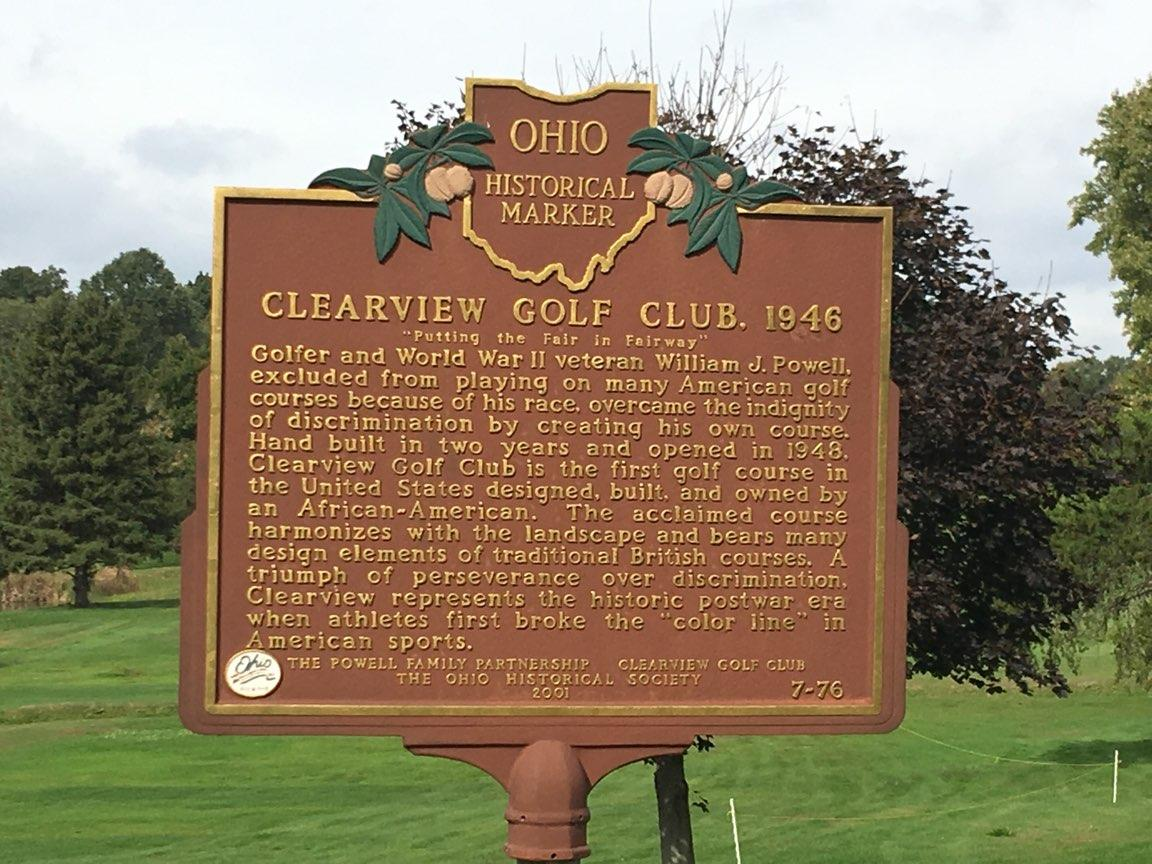
Clearview Golf Club Historic Sign

In 2001, the course was listed in the National Register of Historic Places. Also in 2001, the course began to operate as a non-profit under the name, Clearview Legacy Foundation. The foundation, the club and the Ohio Historical Society erected a historical marker on the site in 2001.

The club was renovated for free in 2004 by Hurdzan-Fry Golf Course Design. The Hurdzan-Fry renovation helped fix the main drainage system at the course. The drainage system was connected to two ponds on the course.

In 2007, civil engineering students from the University of Akron provided drawings and designs to help renovate the golf course. The drawings helped the fundraising drive to raise $1.6 million for capital improvements. In 2009, the club faced problems when Buckeye Industrial Mining was allowed to mine coal 370 feet from the club.

== See also ==
- Shady Rest Golf and Country Club – established in 1921, listed on the NRHP in Union County, New Jersey
- Meadowbrook Country Club – listed on the NRHP in Wake County, North Carolina
