= Ted Rhodes Foundation =

The Ted Rhodes Foundation, Inc. is a U.S. non-profit organization created in honor of Ted Rhodes, an African American professional golfer active during the mid-twentieth century. Rhodes played a significant role in challenging racial barriers within the sport of golf. The foundation’s mission is to encourage and support future generations of minority golfers. Ted Rhodes was one among the first black golfers to compete in a U.S. Open. In the mid-1940s, he qualified for entry into the PGA's major tournaments; however, he was denied participation solely based on his race. At that time, golf's major professional organization in the U.S., the PGA, had a "Caucasian-only" clause in its rules, preventing non-white players from competing. Rhodes persisted in challenging this discrimination, paving the way for future generations of minority golfers.

The Ted Rhodes Foundation, Inc. organizes educational events, golf clinics, and tournaments for both youth and adults. It also offers financial assistance to golf teams at Historically Black Colleges and Universities (HBCUs) to further its mission. In addition, the foundation collaborates with local urban youth golf programs.

Originally founded in 1970 by Nashville golf enthusiasts, the organization was incorporated in 1993 as a fund-raising entity by the daughter of Ted Rhodes, Peggy Rhodes-White. It was then renamed "The Ted Rhodes Foundation, Inc." The organization continues to promote diversity and access within the sport of golf.
