= Shady Rest Country Club =

- U.S. National Register of Historic Places
- New Jersey Register of Historic Places
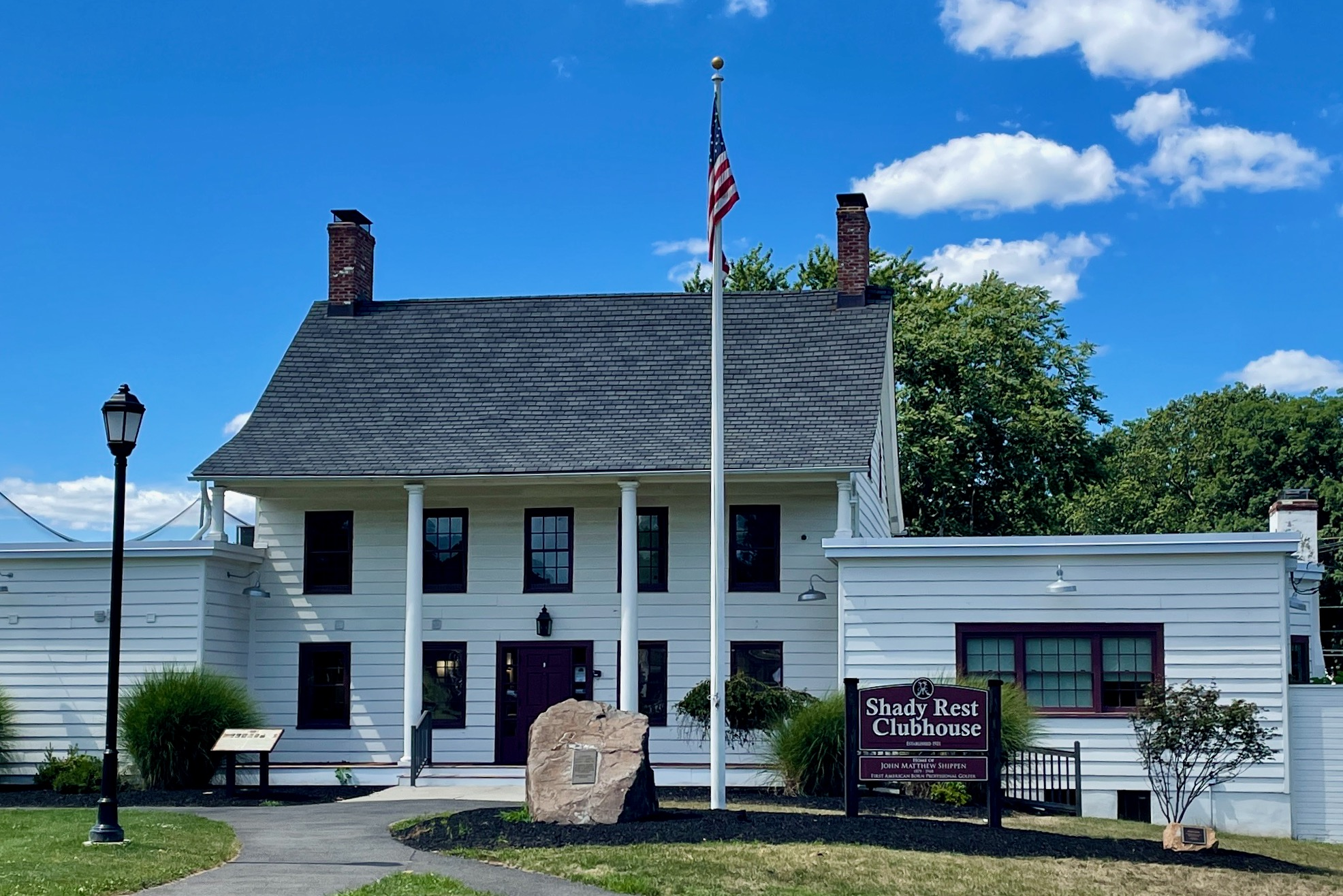
- Shady Rest Clubhouse

- Location within Union County, New Jersey Location within New Jersey Location within the United States
- Location: 820 Jerusalem Road; Scotch Plains, New Jersey, U.S.
- Coordinates: 40°39′22″N 74°22′21″W
- Area: 30.25 acres (12.24 ha)
- Architectural style: Greek Revival, Colonial Revival
- NRHP reference No.: 100007869
- NJRHP No.: 5190

Significant dates
- Added to NRHP: July 7, 2022
- Designated NJRHP: May 18, 2022

The Shady Rest Country Club is a historic country club and public golf course that was the first African-American country club established in the United States. It was established in 1921 in Scotch Plains in Union County, New Jersey. It is at 820 Jerusalem Road. From 1931 to 1964, it was the home of John Shippen (1879–1968), the first American professional golfer and the first African American to compete in the U.S. Open. His presence marked a golden era for the club, which became a vibrant social and cultural hub for Black intellectuals, artists, and athletes. The club had a 9-hole course, six tennis courts, croquet, horseback riding, a baseball diamond, and skeet shooting.

Shady Rest was founded with the mission of creating a recreational and cultural haven for African Americans of all ages. It offered a wide range of activities including golf, tennis, and horseback riding; all within a welcoming, inclusive environment.

Shady Rest was added to the National Register of Historic Places on July 7, 2022, for its significance in entertainment, ethnic heritage, recreation, and social history from 1921 to 1964. The township acquired the property in 1938 and converted it to a public golf course in 1964, known as Scotch Hills Country Club, before renaming the course back to Shady Rest Country Club in 2021.

== History ==
In 1798, Ephraim Tucker Sr. sold his 30-acre (12 ha) farm to his son, Ephraim. Based on architectural and dendrochronology evidence, the son tore down the existing farmhouse and built a new two-story house. In 1808, he sold it to John Losey and his wife, Sarah. In 1830, Benjamin Losey inherited the house from his father, John, and soon built a two and one-half story section with Greek Revival style. Robert Rhea Johnston and his wife, Mary, were living here c. 1860. The property remained in the family until 1882, when it was sold by the estate to George B. Osborn and his wife, Ellenora. She later lived in Westfield and sold the farm in 1899. Inter-Urban Realty Co. subsequently owned the property.

In 1900, the Westfield Country Club was organized as a golf club. It leased the land from Inter-Urban, built a 9-hole golf course and used the Osborn farmhouse as its clubhouse. At this time, the house was expanded by adding two one-story wings and a full-length two-story porch with four columns. The club bought the property in 1912. Unable to expand, the club merged with the Cranford Golf Club to form the Echo Lake Country Club in 1921.

In 1921, the Progressive Realty Corporation was formed by African American residents and investors. They leased the property and opened the Shady Rest Country Club on July 28, 1921. It was the first, African American country clubs in the United States. Featuring a 9-hole course, six tennis courts, croquet, horseback riding, a baseball diamond and skeet shooting, it was a great attraction for visitors. Shady Rest quickly became a cultural and recreational sanctuary for African Americans during the Jim Crow era and was listed in The Negro Motorist Green Book, a travel guide created by Victor Hugo Green that helped Black travelers navigate safely across the country from 1936 to 1966.

Club financial problems led to the township acquiring the property in 1938 through a tax lien foreclosure, but allowing the club to continue operation. In 1964, the township converted it into a public golf course, named the Scotch Hills Country Club. The club was renamed back to its original name in its centennial year, 2021.

The Shady Rest Country Club was added to the New Jersey Black Heritage Trail in 2024.

== Golf ==
A 2,340-yard (2,140 m) 9-hole golf course was built in 1900 by the Westfield Country Club. It was designed by David Smith Hunter, a Scottish golf professional. It is now a 2,247-yard (2,055 m) long course with a par of 33. The course contributes to the NRHP listing. The course rating is 31.7, with a slope rating of 114 from the blue tees. The property includes the historic Shady Rest Clubhouse, a Pro Shop (located inside the building to the left of Shady Rest Clubhouse), and a Pavilion.

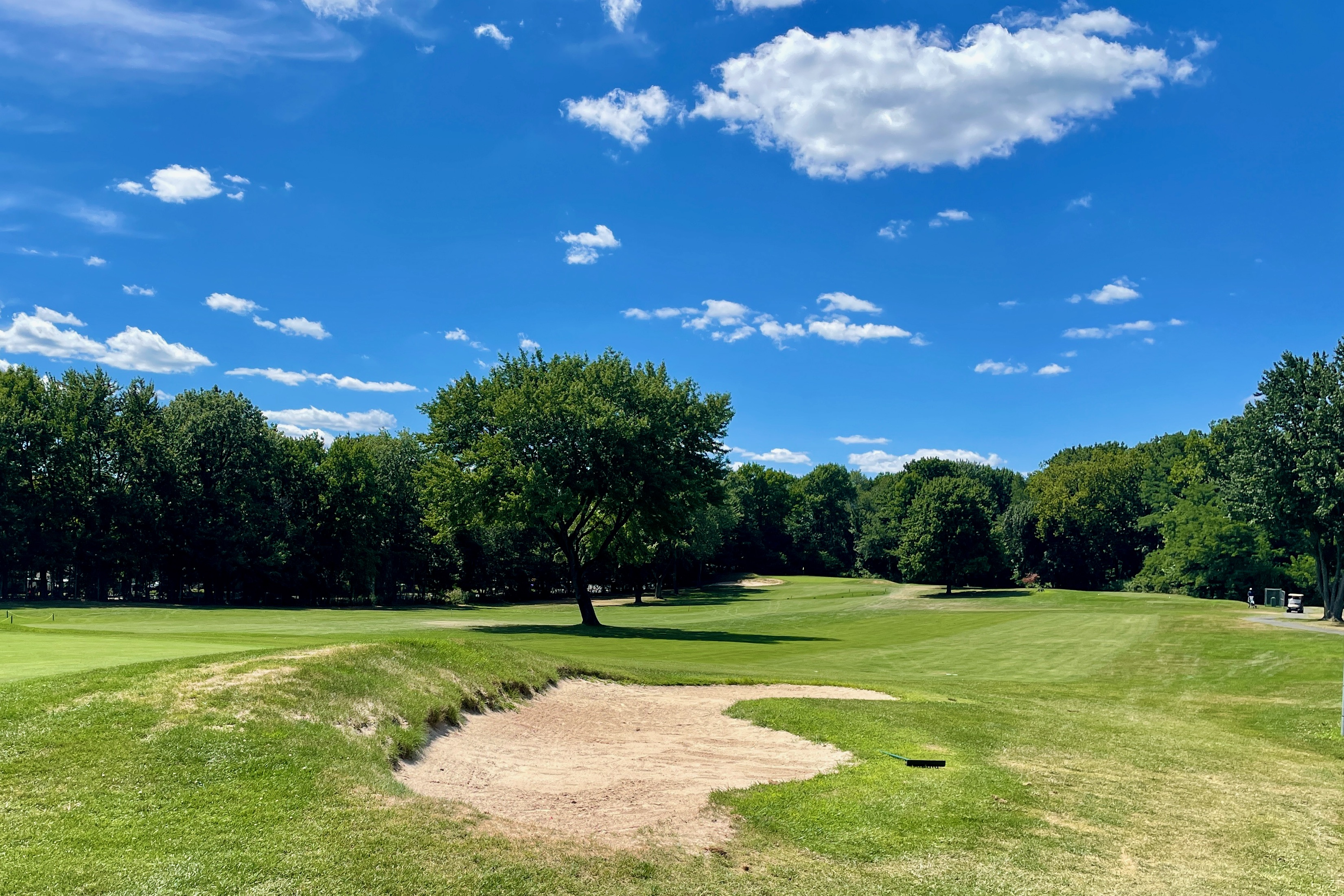
Shady Rest golf course

In 1931, John Shippen, the first American golf professional and the first African American to compete in the U.S. Open, became the club golf pro and groundskeeper. He lived there for over thirty years, until 1964, in an apartment on the third floor of the clubhouse. Shippen was awarded a PGA membership card in 2009 and inducted into the inaugural class of the New Jersey Golf Association Hall of Fame in 2018. His legacy lives on through the John Shippen Memorial Golf Foundation and the John Shippen Invitational, an annual tournament that supports and uplifts young African American golfers.

On July 4 and 5, 1925, the club hosted the first International Golf Championship Tournament, also known as the National Colored Golf Tournament. It was won by Harry Jackson, with John Shippen second. The event was recorded on a newsreel created by Fox Films. The success of this tournament led to the formation of the United Golfers Association in 1926.

== Tennis ==
In the 1940s and 1950s, Shady Rest Country Club became a nurturing ground for tennis, contributing significantly to the sport's history. With six clay tennis courts located where the current ninth-hole green lies, the club was a focal point for local and regional tennis tournaments, attracting players and spectators alike. Alongside tennis pro DeWitt Willis, many members played tennis in tournaments and recreationally. Bleachers were built to accommodate the families and local community members who regularly watched tennis at the course.

Known for tennis, Althea Gibson was a role model and a coach to many, often seen playing matches or imparting her knowledge to younger players. However, Gibson picked up the game of golf at Shady Rest Country Club, contributing to her appearance on the LPGA Tour. Her presence at Shady Rest underscored the club's role in shaping sporting history as Gibson became one of the first female dual professional athletes.

In the summer of 1948, from July 28 to August 1, Shady Rest hosted the Eastern Open Championship, an event sanctioned by the American Tennis Association, confirming its status as a premier venue for African American tennis. The club served as the headquarters for the American Tennis Association for a time, further cementing its importance in the sport's history.

== Music & Entertainment ==
Shady Rest Country Club struggled financially as the club defaulted on their taxes, which resulted in Scotch Plains Township acquiring the Shady Rest property through a tax lien foreclosure in 1938. Under pressure from his peers, William Willis Sr. altered the club’s business strategy to attract the best entertainers to increase event attendance and membership within the club.

Shady Rest quickly became known as “The Mecca of Entertainment on the East Coast” as it became a regular stop for black jazz musicians as they played concert venues in New York City. Jazz musicians Ella Fitzgerald, Duke Ellington, and Billie Holiday filled the Shady Rest with beautiful sound. Many musicians played the Shady Rest, including Chicc Webb, Jimmie Lunceford, Lionel Hampton, Sarah Vaughan, Cab Calloway, Earl Hines, Count Basie, and Louis Armstrong.

Shady Rest consisted of a speakeasy in the basement during the prohibition era, known to some as Villa Casanova. The venue played host to several musicians including Ella Fitzgerald when she was on tour with the Chicc Webb band.

== Modern Day ==
Today, Shady Rest Country Club is owned by the township of Scotch Plains, while the golf course is operated by Kemper Sports, a golf management company. The property features a mini golf course, a pavilion, and the original clubhouse that plays host to events and banquets.

Preserve Shady Rest, a local 501(c)(3) non-profit organization advocates for the well-being and history of the club. Preserve Shady Rest holds several events throughout the year while collecting and archiving historical testimonies of Shady Rest Country Club. They also hold field trips and other educational programs, that raises awareness of the history of Shady Rest. Preserve Shady Rest is raising funds to restore the basement, second, third floor of the clubhouse, including John Shippen's bedroom and the Villa Casanova speakeasy, and plans the space to have a operating museum to showcase the history of the club.

== See also ==
- National Register of Historic Places listings in Union County, New Jersey
- Clearview Golf Club – listed on the NRHP in Stark County, Ohio
- Meadowbrook Country Club – listed on the NRHP in Wake County, North Carolina
