= Bill Spiller =

American professional golfer (1913–1988)

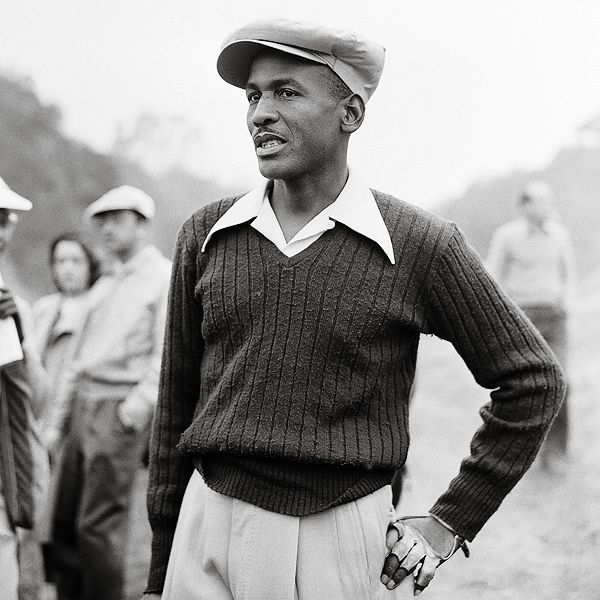
- Spiller at a tournament in the 1950s

Personal information
- Nationality: United States
- Born: October 25, 1913 Tishomingo, Oklahoma, U.S.
- Died: 1988 (aged 74–75) Los Angeles, California, U.S.

Career
- Sport: Golf
- College: Wiley College
- Status: Professional

Bill Spiller (October 25, 1913 – 1988) was an American professional golfer who helped break the color barrier in the sport.

== Biography ==
Spiller was born in Tishomingo, Oklahoma and moved to Tulsa, Oklahoma with his father when he was nine years old. He grew up in a time of frequent racial violence, notably during the Tulsa race massacre. He was an excellent athlete, becoming a two-sport star at Booker T. Washington High School. He later attended Wiley College, a historically black college in Marshall, Texas and earned an education degree.

He did not start playing golf until he was around 30 years old. He moved to Southern California to work as a teacher but also had to take an additional job as a railroad porter. He was introduced to competitive golf by another porter in Los Angeles, and he began to participate and win in amateur golf tournaments for black players in the 1940s.

In 1948, Spiller faced discrimination when he was barred from entering the Richmond Open golf tournament in Richmond, California, due to the Professional Golfers' Association (PGA)'s segregation policy of excluding non-white players.

Spiller and another golfer, Ted Rhodes, sued the PGA for violating the Taft-Hartley Act, which prohibited discrimination in labor unions. After the PGA pledged to stop its discriminatory practices, the lawsuit was withdrawn. However, the PGA persisted in organizing "invitational tournaments" that still barred African-American players from participating.

In 1952, PGA president Horton Smith excluded Spiller and boxer Joe Louis from the San Diego Open, which caused a national outcry and legal threats. The PGA again promised to change, but it kept the segregation clause. In 1960, Stanley Mosk, the attorney general of California, intervened and warned the PGA that it would be barred from using public golf courses unless it ceased its discriminatory policies. Consequently, in November 1961, the PGA consented to eliminate the segregation clause.

However, Spiller’s golf career had already suffered, as he had taken up golf relatively late in life and retired before the segregation clause was removed.

Spiller died in 1988 at the age of 75, one year after suffering a fall in his bathtub. In his final years, he also had a stroke and showed signs of dementia.

In 2009, the PGA of America granted posthumous membership to Spiller, Rhodes, and John Shippen, and also honored Louis with posthumous honorary membership. He was named to the Oklahoma Golf Hall of Fame in 2015.

== See also ==
- Pete Brown (1935–2015), first African-American to win a PGA-sanctioned tournament in 1964
- Lee Elder (1934–2021), first African-American to play in the Masters Tournament in 1975
- Charles Owens (1932–2017)
- Calvin Peete (1943–2015), most successful African-American on the PGA Tour, with 12 wins, before the emergence of Tiger Woods
- Charlie Sifford (1922–2015), first African-American to be member of the PGA Tour in 1961
- Tiger Woods (1975–)
- United Golf Association
