= Renee Powell =

American professional golfer (born 1946)

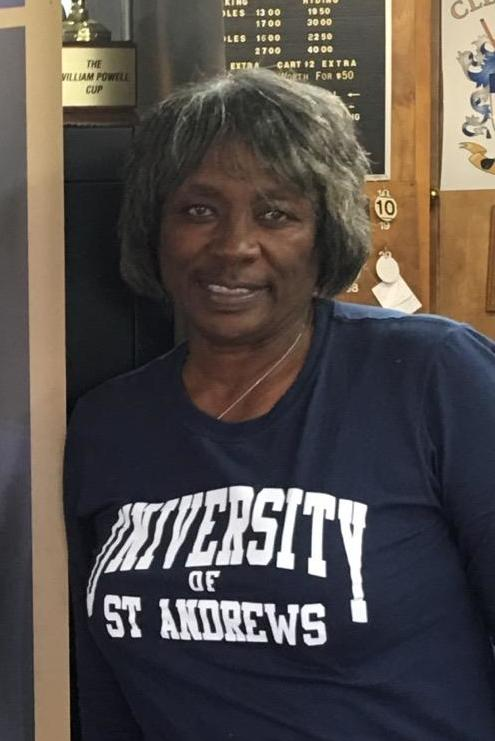
- Powell in 2018

Personal information
- Nationality: United States
- Born: May 4, 1946 (age 80) Canton, Ohio, U.S.
- Height: 5 ft 2 in (1.57 m)

Career
- Sport: Golf
- College: Ohio University; Ohio State University
- Turned professional: 1967
- Former tour: LPGA Tour
- Professional wins: 1

Best results in LPGA major championships
- Western Open: T33: 1967
- Titleholders C'ship: DNP
- Women's PGA C'ship: T20: 1969, 1976
- U.S. Women's Open: T33: 1966
- du Maurier Classic: 78th: 1980

Achievements and awards
- National Afro-American Golfers Hall of Fame: 1986
- National Black Golf Hall of Fame: 2006
- African American Golfers Hall of Fame: 2007
- PGA of America Hall of Fame: 2017
- (For a full list of awards, see here)

Renee Powell (born May 4, 1946) is an American professional golfer who played on the US-based LPGA Tour and is currently head professional at her family's Clearview Golf Club in East Canton, Ohio. She was the second African-American woman ever to play on the LPGA Tour.

The daughter of golf course entrepreneur Bill Powell, Renee grew up in Ohio and took up golf at an early age. After winning several youth amateur trophies in her teens and captaining the women's golf teams at Ohio University and Ohio State University, she turned professional in 1967. She moved to the UK in the 1970s to further her career and joined the British PGA. In 1977, she became the first woman to compete in a men's golf tournament. Following her retirement in 1980, she appeared as a television commentator and became the head professional of the Clearview Golf Club in 1995.

Powell is a member of the Ohio Golf Hall of Fame. She is also a member of Sigma Gamma Rho sorority. In 2017, she was inducted to the PGA of America Hall of Fame.

== Early life ==
Renee Powell was born in East Canton, Ohio, where she was raised Catholic. She began playing golf at the age of three. Her father, Bill Powell, is the first African American to create and build his own golf course in the US. He made miniature golf clubs for her to use as a child and was her golf teacher. Her early life was quiet, and Powell played a number of different sports as a young person, including archery, ballet and basketball. She helped maintain the Clearview golf course, driving a tractor.

Powell entered her first amateur tournament at the age of 12 and won her division. Three years later, in 1960, she had 30 youth tournament trophies. By 1961, she had 50 trophies and was playing golf daily on her father's golf course. She had won the Great Lakes Bantam Golf Tournament, the Columbiana County Open, Clearview Golf Club junior, Sixth City Ladies (three times), Tiretown Open Ladies (twice), Vehicle City tourney, and the Midwest District Junior in three consecutive years. The Akron Beacon Journal called her the "Queen of the Bantam Golf Show." In 1962, she was the first African American to enter the U.S. Girls' Junior. In the junior championship, she caused an upset in winning the first round. In 1963 she won the Akron Tire Town open for a third time. She entered the Girls' Junior Championship again in August 1963. In the summer of 1964, she won a "sudden death" match in the Lyle Chevrolet women's golf tournament. She was considered a favorite in the 1964 United Golf Association (UGA) National Open and went on to take the amateur title that year.

Powell graduated from Central Catholic High School in 1964. She went on to attend Ohio University (OU) and then transferred to Ohio State University (OSU). At OU she was majoring in speech and hearing therapy, but changed her major to sociology when she transferred to OSU. Powell captained the women's golf team at both universities and at OSU, her role as captain made her the first African American to lead a major university golf team. When she wanted to play in the Ohio State Golf Association tournament, OSU backed her decision and stated that they would leave the organization if Powell was not allowed to play.

== Professional career ==
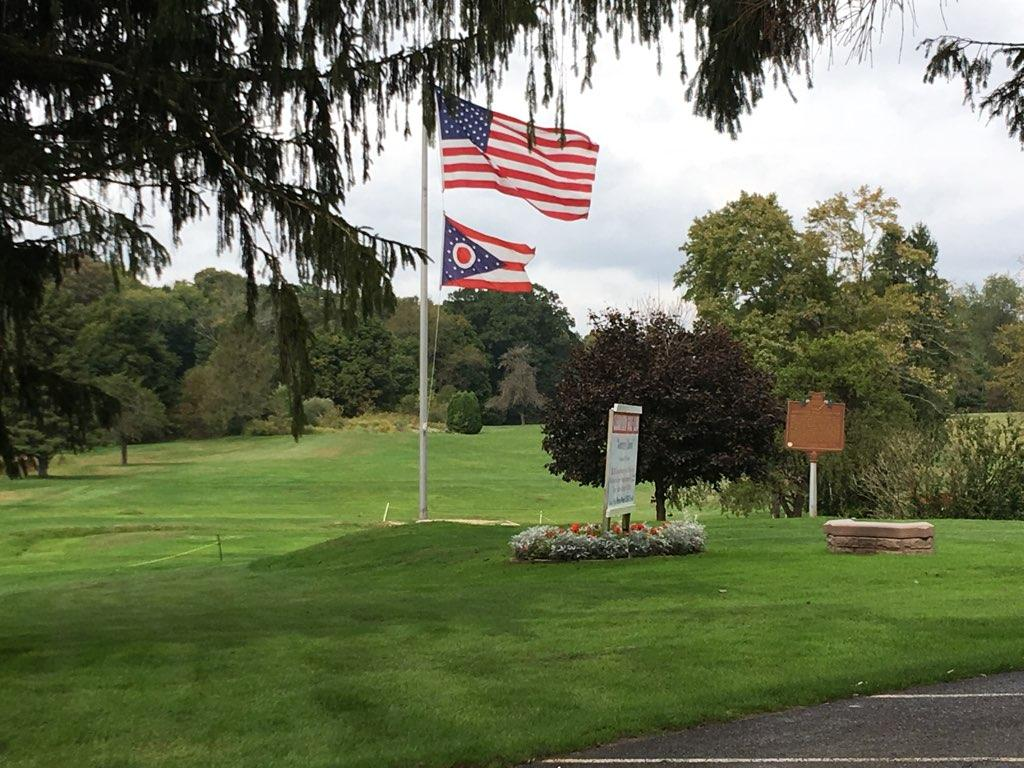
Clearview Golf Club greens

Powell competed in more than 250 professional golf tournaments. In 1967, she joined the Ladies Professional Golf Association (LPGA). She became the second African American player in the LPGA. When she was a rookie in the LPGA, she received death threats by people who did not want to see a black woman playing golf. There were times she was not allowed to stay inside the official tournament hotels. When she toured with Canadian golfer Sandra Post, the two would work together to ensure that Powell would be able to get a room. Sometimes, however, Powell and Post would not be served at restaurants and left hungry. When they were not served, Powell would joke, "I didn't want to tell you, but it's because you're Canadian." Powell did not make enough money to live just off her golf earnings, so she also worked at Wilson Sporting Goods and doing golf clinics and exhibitions. Her parents were also happy to help her out financially. By 1969, the LPGA insisted that they were an integrated tour and announced this at any towns they were visiting in order to head off problems before they might start for Powell.

Powell won the 1973 Kelly-Springfield Tournament in Surfers Paradise, Queensland, Australia. Her win was a course-record when she scored a final-round of 67 strokes. She visited Africa 25 times, and taught golf to heads of state and other people while there. She undertook a USO Tour in 1971, which included meeting troops in Vietnam at the height of the war. She was friends with fellow golfer Patty Berg, who encouraged her career and advised her on how to hold golf clinics.

Powell moved to the UK in the 1970s to improve her career there, playing her first round at the Old Course at St Andrews in 1975. She was briefly the first female head professional at Silvermere Golf Club. Powell later joined the British PGA and was the first woman to compete in a British men's tournament when she played in the 1977 Surrey PGA Championship. She also designed golfing outfits for Harrods. She styled herself "the lone ranger" due to being the only significant black female professional golfer.

In 1980, she retired from the LPGA. During her time at the LPGA, she had competed in over 250 professional golf events. After retirement, she became a television commentator for ABC and CBS. In 1995, she became the head professional at Clearview Golf Club in East Canton, Ohio, which her father had started in 1948 as a club free of racial and social discrimination. Her work as manager of the Clearview club was recognized by the LPGA in 2000 when it designated the course as one of 75 Girls Golf Club sites. She runs a rehabilitation program, Clearview HOPE, for female war veterans. Clearview HOPE is a golf program that is recreational, therapeutic, and free for veterans in Northern Ohio.

In 2019, Powell was elected to become the first at-large member of the PGA of America board of directors.

== Awards ==
Powell and her family were awarded the Jack Nicklaus Golf Family Award from the National Golf Foundation (NGF) in 1992. She was elected as a member of the PGA of America in 1996. The LPGA honored her with a Service Award in 1999. In 2003, she was awarded the First Lady of Golf Award from the PGA.

In 2013, Powell was inducted into the Stark County Amateur Hall of Fame. She earned a Black Enterprise Women of Power award in 2016. Powell was later inducted into the PGA America Hall of Fame in 2017. Her father had also been an inductee, making the pair the only father / daughter combination to both receive this award. Upon induction, Powell said, "To be inducted into the PGA hall of fame alongside my father is extremely special as he was my only instructor over these many years."

Powell earned an honorary Doctor of Laws degree from the University of St Andrews in 2008. In 2015, was invited to become one of the first women members of the Royal and Ancient Golf Club of St Andrews. At the formal luncheon at the club, she was allowed to bring one guest and Powell chose to bring her friend, Franco Harris. At the university in 2016, the women's team named their tournament after Powell. In 2018, Powell came back to St Andrews for a ribbon cutting ceremony for two new student residence halls at the university, one of which was named after her. Powell and her family were honored with the Old Tom Morris Award by the Golf Course Superintendents Association of America at the 2019 Golf Industry Show.
