= Herbert Dixon (golfer) =

American golfer (1919–2026)

Herbert Dixon (September 16, 1919 – August 21, 2026) was an American professional golfer on the African American circuit in the 1940s and 1950s during segregation. In 1951 he won the National Negro Open. He was a member of the black players hall of fame.

Dixon went to Union Academy and still lived in Bartow, Florida. In 2018, on receiving a local award at 98 he was reported to still be playing golf almost every day. He served in the United States Air Force during the Truman era. Dixon was also an NAACP leader in Bartow. He learned to play and caddied at the Bartow Golf Course. A tournament was held in his honour in 2019.

He was inducted into the African-American Golfers Hall of Fame in 2012, and into the Polk County Sports Hall of Fame in 2019.

Dixon died on August 21, 2026, at the age of 106.

== See also ==
- United Golf Association
