= Meadowbrook Country Club (Garner, North Carolina) =

Historic district in North Carolina, United States

- U.S. National Register of Historic Places
- U.S. Historic district
- Location within North Carolina Location within the United States
- Location: 8025 Country Club Dr., near Garner, North Carolina
- Coordinates: 35°39′37″N 78°34′10″W
- Area: 120.8 acres (48.9 ha)
- Built: 1961
- Architect: Hamm, Gene
- Architectural style: Modern Movement
- NRHP reference No.: 09001106
- Added to NRHP: December 16, 2009

Meadowbrook Country Club is a historic country club and national historic district located near Garner, Wake County, North Carolina. The club was founded in 1959, with initial improvements made throughout the 1960s. The contributing resources are the lake (1961); pier (1961); picnic area (1962); driving range (1966); nine-hole golf course designed by Gene Hamm (1966); one-story, concrete block, Modern Movement style clubhouse (1962, 1970, 1971); and 18-hole putt-putt course (1962). Meadowbrook Country Club was founded as a private country club for African-Americans.

It was listed on the National Register of Historic Places in 2009.

== See also ==
- Shady Rest Golf and Country Club – established in 1921, listed on the NRHP in Union County, New Jersey
- Clearview Golf Club – listed on the NRHP in Stark County, Ohio
