= Ted Rhodes =

American professional golfer (1919–1969

Personal information
- Full name: Theodore Rhodes
- Nickname: "Rags"
- Nationality: United States
- Born: November 9, 1913 Nashville, Tennessee, U.S.
- Died: July 4, 1969 (aged 55)
- Children: 1

Career
- Sport: Golf
- Status: Professional
- Former tours: UGA and PGA (awarded posthumously)
- Professional wins: 150

Best results in major championships
- U.S. Open: T51: 1948

Theodore Rhodes (November 9, 1913 – July 4, 1969) was an American professional golfer in the mid-twentieth century, a time when African American golfers were a rarity. Rhodes helped break golf's color barrier. A native of Nashville, Tennessee, he dominated the Negro UGA circuit, winning around 150 tournaments from the late 1940s to 1960, including four National Negro Open titles. He qualified for high-profile PGA tournaments but was denied admission because of that organization’s “Caucasian-only” clause. His perseverance in fighting such discrimination benefited future generations of minority golfers. An example is Tiger Woods who, during his historic first Masters victory speech, mentioned Rhodes as one of the pioneers who paved the way for him to compete in major golf events. After Rhodes' death in 1969 (age 55), the Ted Rhodes Foundation was established to promote youth golf and support golf teams at historically black colleges and universities(HBCUs). Rhodes' home course in Nashville was re-named in his honor. He was inducted into the Tennessee Sports Hall of Fame and the Tennessee Golf Hall of Fame.

== Early life ==
Rhodes was born in Nashville, Tennessee, the son of Frank and Della Anderson Rhodes. He was a self-taught golfer, learning the game in his teenage years while working as a caddie at Nashville's Belle Meade Country Club and Richland Country Club. There were no local courses in town open to African Americans, but being a caddie at a country club allowed him to observe how the game is played, and was a source for some discarded golf clubs. Rhodes practiced the game at a local baseball field called Sunset Park using sticks with homemade flags as pins. He attended Pearl-Cohn High School and caddied on the weekends.

In the late 1930s, Rhodes joined the Civilian Conservation Corps (CCC), a New Deal program that provided jobs for unemployed young men. He served in the United States Navy in World War II. When his tour of duty concluded, Rhodes was discharged in Chicago, where he met entertainer Billy Eckstine and heavyweight boxing champion Joe Louis. He taught both men to play the game of golf, and served as Louis' personal instructor, valet and playing partner. Louis facilitated Rhodes' moving to southern California in the late 1940s, to be coached by Ray Mangrum, brother of champion golfer Lloyd Mangrum.

== Golf career ==
While living in California, Rhodes competed in select white-run tournaments that permitted Black participants, such as the Tam O’Shanter and the L.A. Open. The Tam O'Shanter was his first exposure playing before large crowds that could be hostile. However, the majority of his competitive play took place on the Negro league United Golf Association sanctioned tournaments. He had great success in these tournaments, winning six times in a row from 1946 to 1947. He won four UGA Championships and the National Negro Open. Over his career, he won about 150 tournaments. Courses he played included Rogers Park, Tampa and in the Canadian Open.

He was one of the first African Americans to play in a U.S. Open. In 1948, it was held at the Riviera Country Club in Los Angeles. His participation established him as one of the first African American professional golfers.

== Discrimination ==
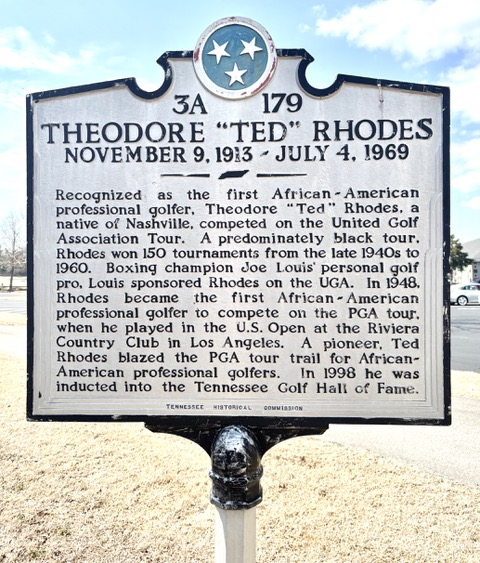

Rhodes and fellow African American Bill Spiller were among the top winners in the Los Angeles Open; in fact, Spiller was in the spotlight after tying Ben Hogan with a 68 in the first round. The fact of Spiller being a Negro was avoided in press accounts of that opening round. Their low scores qualified them to play in the Richmond, California Open; however, after a couple of practice rounds at Richmond, they were told that they were disqualified because the rules there were different. The tournament was open only to regular members of the PGA of America. They were deemed non-members because of a "Caucasians only" rule. This clause in the original PGA Constitution was written in 1918 and never changed. Humiliated, Rhodes, Spiller and a third Black golfer Madison Gunther called a press conference, then contacted a sports producer at ABC who broadcast the story nationally. They initiated litigation against the Professional Golfers' Association of America (PGA) seeking removal of the association's "Caucasian only clause". Rhodes said, "Those guys don't hit the ball any better than we do. All we need is a chance to get in there and shoot with them." They agreed to drop the suit if racial discrimination was halted. Although Rhodes, Spiller and Gunther prevailed in the out-of-court settlement, the PGA circumvented the agreement by changing its tournaments to "invitationals" and invited only whites to participate. The clause was removed at the 1961 PGA Annual Meeting.

== Legacy ==
Rhodes returned to his native Nashville in the 1960s where he mentored several black PGA players including Lee Elder and Charlie Sifford. He provided golf lessons to Althea Gibson, former U.S. and Wimbledon tennis champion. Rhodes was known for his distinctive clothing and sense of style both on and off the course. His daughter Peggy Rhodes-White said, “He had golf shoes to match every outfit and color of pants he wore.” His nickname was "Rags". Some thought the nickname was for his stylish wardrobe. But, according to author Pete MeDaniel, the name was given to him when he was teased about the tattered clothes he wore as a young caddy in Nashville.

He died at the age of 55. A month after his death, the Cumberland Golf Course in Nashville was renamed "The Ted Rhodes Golf Course" in his honor. The Ted Rhodes Golf Classic Charity Tournament was soon inaugurated and became an annual event that, as of 2025, will celebrate its 56th year. In 2009, the PGA of America granted posthumous membership to Rhodes, Spiller, and John Shippen. The PGA also has granted posthumous honorary membership to boxer Joe Louis. During his first Masters win speech, Tiger Woods mentioned Rhodes as one of the pioneers that paved the way for him to play golf. In 1998, Rhodes was inducted into the Tennessee Golf Hall of Fame and in 2010, into the Tennessee Sports Hall of Fame. He was named to the National Black Golf Hall of Fame in 1986.

The Ted Rhodes Foundation was created in 1993, a non-profit entity that supports golf teams at historically black colleges and universities, such as Nashville's Fisk University. Among other functions, it supports urban junior golf programs, such as First Tee of Tennessee. The foundation is run by Rhodes's granddaughter Tiffany White.
