= National Black Golf Hall of Fame =

Coordinates: 33.75856°N 84.34730°W

The National Black Golf Hall of Fame was started by Harold Dunovant, the first African-American to graduate from the PGA of America's business school in 1964. He was unable to become a Class A PGA Member for six years because no one would sign his application. Inductees include:

- Willie Black, caddy and golfer who headed up construction and operations of Tampa, Florida's Rogers Park, Tampa course
- Barbara Douglas, the first minority member of the USGA Women's Committee (and later its chair)
- Ann Gregory, the first African-American woman to play in a national championship conducted by the United States Golf Association.
- John F. Merchant, the first minority on the USGA Executive Committee
- Winston Lake Golf Course in Winston-Salem, North Carolina.
- Renee Powell, the second African-American woman ever to play on the LPGA Tour.
- Ted Rhodes, 1986 inductee. Rhodes helped break golf's color barrier in the mid-twentieth century, a time when African American golfers were a rarity.
