= United Golf Association =

Defunct golf organization in the United States

- Abbreviation: UGA
- Founded: c. 1925
- Founder: Robert Hawkins
- Type: Professional sports association
- Region served: United States
- Field: Golf
- Also known as: United Golfers Association
- Nickname: Chitlin Circuit
- Known for: National Negro Open

The United Golf Association or United Golfers Association (UGA) was a group of African-American professional golfers who operated a separate series of professional golf tournaments for Blacks during the era of racial segregation in the United States. It was affectionately known as the Chitlin Circuit. (Note: Not to be confused with the collection of African-American performance venues for musicians, comedians, and other entertainers active from the 1930s through the 1960s known as the Chitlin' Circuit.)

== History ==
The UGA was said to have started in 1925, when George Adams became a founding member, or in 1926 by Robert Hawkins, a golfer from Massachusetts. Members of the Association included many talented golfers such as Ted Rhodes, Bill Spiller, Pete Brown, Lee Elder, Willie Brown Jr., Zeke Hartsfield, Howard Wheeler, and Charlie Sifford.

Women were allowed to participate from the group's inception, but only in 1939 did the first women's golfing organization seek affiliation when the Chicago Women's Golf Club, organized by Anna Robinson, applied to join. Also, the Wake-Robin Golf Club, whose first president was Helen Webb Harris, joined the UGA under her leadership.

The Association's most prestigious event was the National Negro Open. Winners of the event included six-time winner Charles Sifford, Herbert Dixon, Ted Rhodes, and Jim Dent. Jimmy Taylor added the Mid Winter Classic at Rogers Park, Tampa, to the circuit in 1963.

From 1934 through November 1961, the Professional Golfers Association of America (PGA of America) maintained a "Caucasian-only" membership clause in its bylaws. The clause was removed by amending its constitution.

== Legacy ==
Contemporary golf associations for African Americans include the African American Golf Association (AAGA), United States Black Golf Association, United Black Golfers Association (UBGA), Western States Golf Association, Bogey Boyz, Black Jewels Ladies Golf Association and the African American Golf Foundation, Inc.

== See also ==
- Shady Rest Country Club, the first African-American country club established in the United States (1921)
