= Charlie Sifford =

American professional golfer (1922–2015)

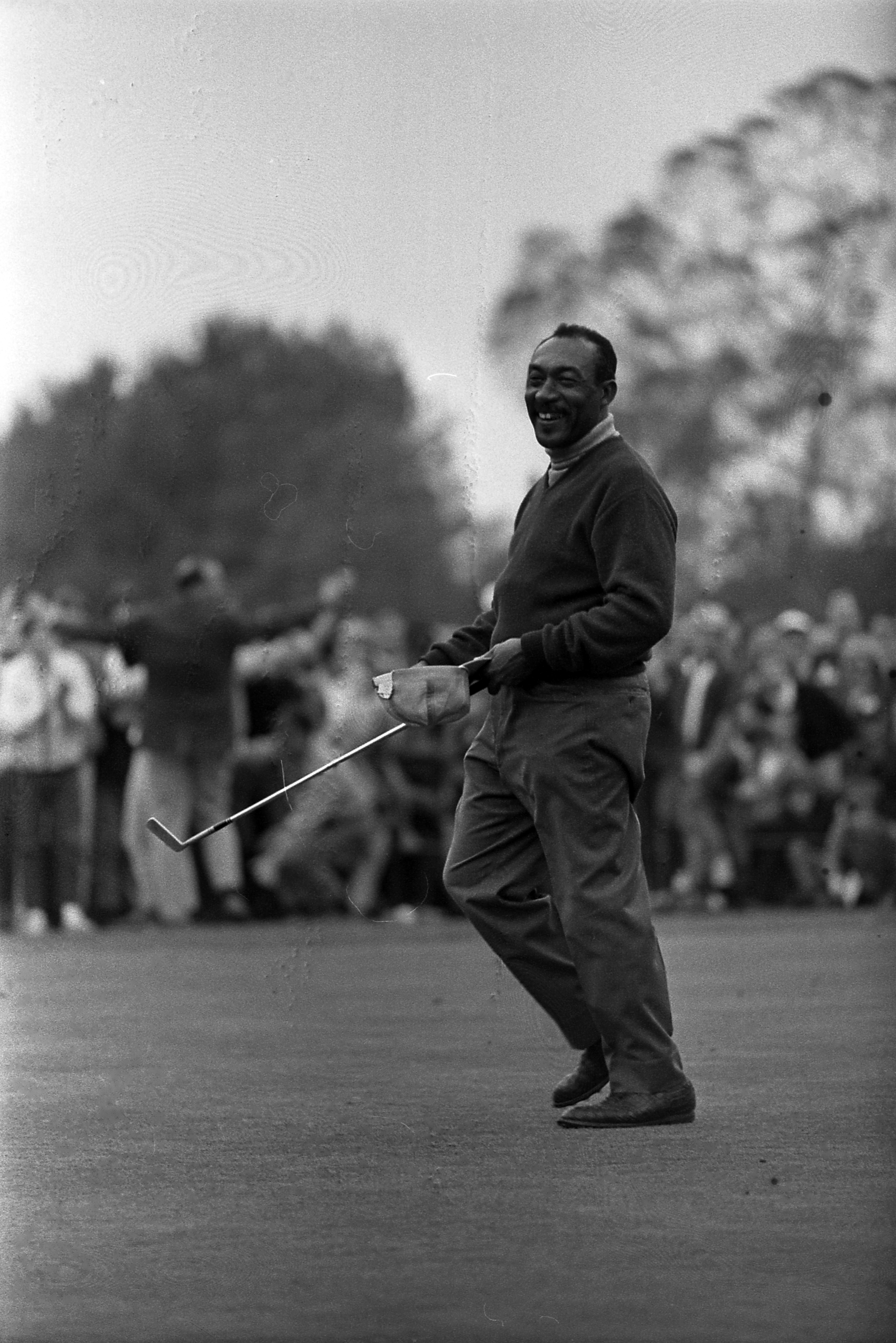
- Sifford winning the 1969 Los Angeles Open

Personal information
- Full name: Charles Luther Sifford
- Nationality: United States
- Born: June 2, 1922 Charlotte, North Carolina, U.S.
- Died: February 3, 2015 (aged 92) Cleveland, Ohio, U.S.

Career
- Sport: Golf
- Turned professional: 1948
- Former tours: PGA Tour; Champions Tour
- Professional wins: 22

Number of wins by tour
- PGA Tour: 2
- PGA Tour Champions: 1
- Other: 19

Best results in major championships
- Masters Tournament: DNP
- PGA Championship: T33: 1965
- U.S. Open: T21: 1972
- The Open Championship: DNP

Achievements and awards
- World Golf Hall of Fame: 2004 (member page)
- Old Tom Morris Award: 2007
- Presidential Medal of Freedom: 2014

Charles Luther Sifford (June 2, 1922 – February 3, 2015) was an American professional golfer. Early in his career, he won a number of All-Negro events, winning the United Golf Association's National Negro Open six times. Later in his career, he was permitted to play on the PGA Tour, winning two events, the 1967 Greater Hartford Open and the 1969 Los Angeles Open. His huge influence was later acknowledged by Tiger Woods: without Sifford, "I probably wouldn't be here. My dad would have never picked up the game. Who knows if the clause would still exist or not? But he broke it down."

== Early life and amateur career ==
Sifford was born in Charlotte, North Carolina, in 1922. He began work as a caddy at the age of thirteen. He moved to Philadelphia when he was 17 years old, where he played against local black golfers. He often played at Philadelphia's Cobbs Creek Golf Course, a public facility that did not restrict players based on race, gender, or ethnicity.

== Professional career ==
In 1948, Sifford turned professional. He competed in the golf tournaments that black golfers organized for themselves as they were excluded from the Professional Golfers' Association of America (PGA). Sifford won the United Golf Association's National Negro Open six times, including consecutive wins from 1952 through 1956. Sifford later worked as a valet and golf instructor to the singer Billy Eckstine, who also financially supported his career when he was unable to find sponsorship.

Sifford first attempted to qualify for a PGA Tour event at the 1952 Phoenix Open, using an invitation obtained by former World heavyweight boxing champion Joe Louis. Sifford was subjected to threats and racial abuse there and at other tournaments.

In 1957, Sifford won the Long Beach Open, which was not an official PGA Tour event, but was co-sponsored by the PGA and had some well-known white players in the field. Sifford competed at the 1959 U.S. Open for the first time and tied for 32nd place. He became a member of the tour in 1961 and became the first African-American to join the PGA Tour. He went on to win two official money events, the 1967 Greater Hartford Open and the 1969 Los Angeles Open, and finished in the top 60 in overall winnings in his first nine years as a member of the PGA Tour. He also won the 1963 Puerto Rico Open and the 1971 Sea Pines. He tied for 21st place at the 1972 U.S. Open, his best finish in a major tournament. He competed in the PGA Seniors' Championship, then the leading tournament for golfers over fifty, winning the event in 1975.

== Personal life and legacy ==
Sifford's wife, Rose, died in 1998. They had two sons, Charles Jr. and Craig. Sifford, a resident of Brecksville, Ohio, was hospitalized for a stroke one month before he died in Cleveland, Ohio. He died on February 3, 2015, at the age of 92.

Immediately after his death, Tiger Woods, speaking to the Los Angeles Times, spoke of Sifford's significance. He referred to Sifford as "the Grandpa I never had." He stated without Sifford "I probably wouldn't be here. My dad would have never picked up the game. Who knows if the clause would still exist or not? But he broke it down."

== Awards and honors ==
- In 2004, Sifford became the first African American inducted into the World Golf Hall of Fame. He chose Hall of Fame member South African Gary Player to present him for induction.
- On June 22, 2006, he received an honorary degree from the University of St Andrews as a Doctor of Laws.
- In 2007, he also received the 2007 Old Tom Morris Award from the Golf Course Superintendents Association of America (GCSAA), the GCSAA's highest honor.
- In 2009, the Northern Trust Open created an exemption for a player who represents the advancement of diversity in golf; it is named in honor of Sifford and is referred to as the Charlie Sifford Exemption.
- In 2011, Mecklenburg County Park and Recreation changed the name of Revolution Park Golf Course to Dr. Charles L. Sifford Golf Course at Revolution Park.
- In 2014, President Barack Obama awarded him the Presidential Medal of Freedom.

== Professional wins (22) ==
=== PGA Tour wins (2) ===
No.	Date	Tournament	Winning score	Margin of victory	Runner-up
1	Aug 20, 1967	Greater Hartford Open Invitational	−12 (69-70-69-64=272)	1 stroke	(United States) Steve Oppermann
2	Jan 12, 1969	Los Angeles Open	−8 (63-71-71-71=276)	Playoff	(South Africa) Harold Henning

PGA Tour playoff record (1–0)

No.	Year	Tournament	Opponent	Result
1	1969	Los Angeles Open	(South Africa) Harold Henning	Won with birdie on first extra hole

=== Other wins (12) ===
- 1952 UGA National Negro Open
- 1953 UGA National Negro Open
- 1954 UGA National Negro Open
- 1955 UGA National Negro Open
- 1956 UGA National Negro Open, Rhode Island Open
- 1957 Long Beach Open
- 1960 UGA National Negro Open, Almaden Open (unofficial win – one year before becoming a PGA Tour event)
- 1963 Puerto Rico Open
- 1971 Sea Pines
- 1975 Northern Ohio PGA Championship

=== Senior PGA Tour wins (1) ===
No.	Date	Tournament	Winning score	Margin of victory	Runner-up
1	Nov 16, 1980	Suntree Classic	−9 (70-71-71-67=279)	4 strokes	(United States) Don January

=== Other senior wins (7) ===
- 1975 PGA Seniors' Championship – (5 years before becoming a Champions Tour event; the event is now a Champions Tour major)
- 1988 Liberty Mutual Legends of Golf – Legendary Division (with Roberto De Vicenzo)
- 1989 Liberty Mutual Legends of Golf – Legendary Division (with Roberto De Vicenzo)
- 1991 Liberty Mutual Legends of Golf – Legendary Division (with Roberto De Vicenzo)
- 1998 Liberty Mutual Legends of Golf – Demaret Division (with Joe Jimenez)
- 1999 Liberty Mutual Legends of Golf – Demaret Division (with Joe Jimenez)
- 2000 Liberty Mutual Legends of Golf – Demaret Division (with Joe Jimenez)

== Results in major championships ==
Tournament	1959	1960	1961	1962	1963	1964	1965	1966	1967	1968	1969
U.S. Open	T32	T46		T43		27	CUT			T32	
PGA Championship							T33			T59	CUT

Tournament	1970	1971	1972	1973	1974	1975	1976	1977	1978	1979	1980
U.S. Open		T49	T21	CUT	60	CUT			CUT		
PGA Championship						T48		CUT			CUT

Did not play

CUT = missed the half-way cut
"T" indicates a tie for a place
Note: Sifford never played in the Masters Tournament or The Open Championship.
