= Kobe foreign settlement =

Foreign settlement in Japan

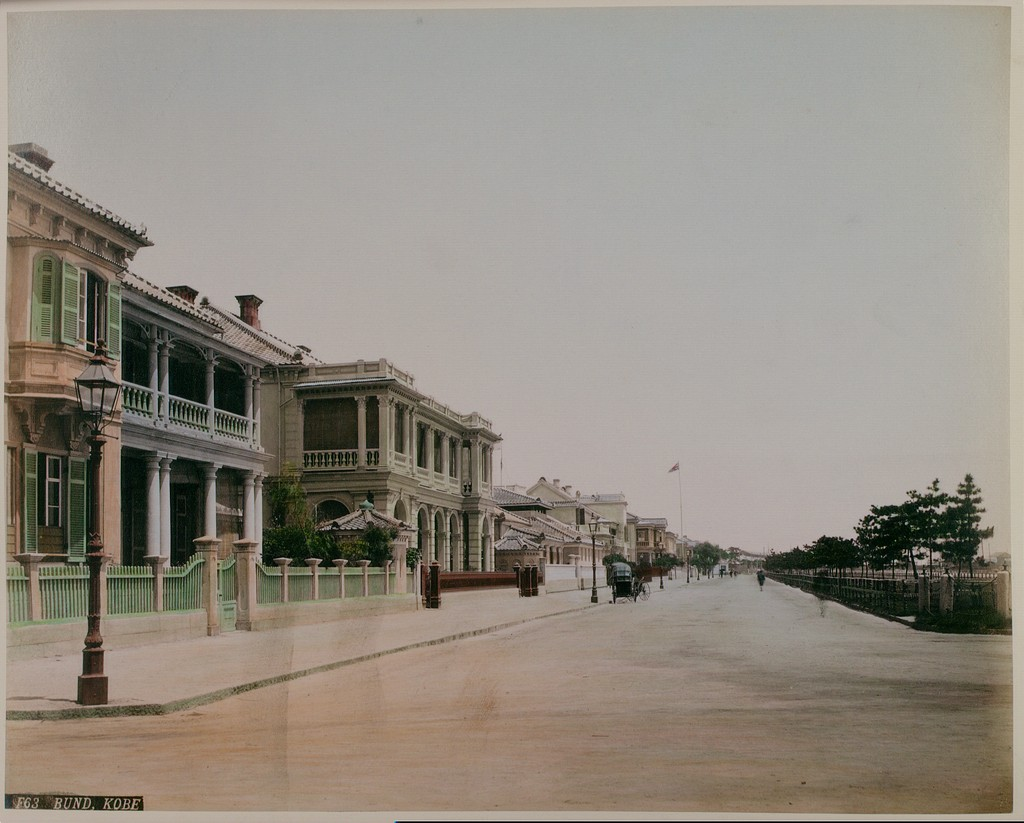
Townscape of the Kobe foreign settlement around 1885, on the coastal road Kaigan-dōri

The Kobe foreign settlement (神戸外国人居留地, Kōbe gaikokujin kyoryūchi), also known as the Kobe foreign concession, was a foreign settlement located about 3.5 kilometers east of the Port of Kobe, in the future Chūō-ku of Kobe, Japan. Established based on the Ansei Treaties, it existed from January 1, 1868, to July 16, 1899.

The site was located between the Ikuta River to the east, the Koi River (鯉川) (site of a future thoroughfare) to the west, the sea to the south, and the Saigoku Kaidō (西国街道) highway to the north. It had an area of 78,000 tsubo (about 25.8 hectares), and was developed based on a logical urban plan. For these reasons, it has been praised as the "best-planned foreign settlement in the Orient". Its extraterritoriality was acknowledged in some of its administrative and financial affairs, and it was managed by an autonomous organization structured with foreign residents (most of whom had interests in east-India company and/or associates) at its center. Its operation was smooth, and relations between the Japanese and foreign sides were generally favorable. The settlement prospered as a gateway to Western culture and base of trade, spreading its economic and cultural influence to the surrounding areas as well.

== History ==
=== Opening the Port of Hyōgo ===
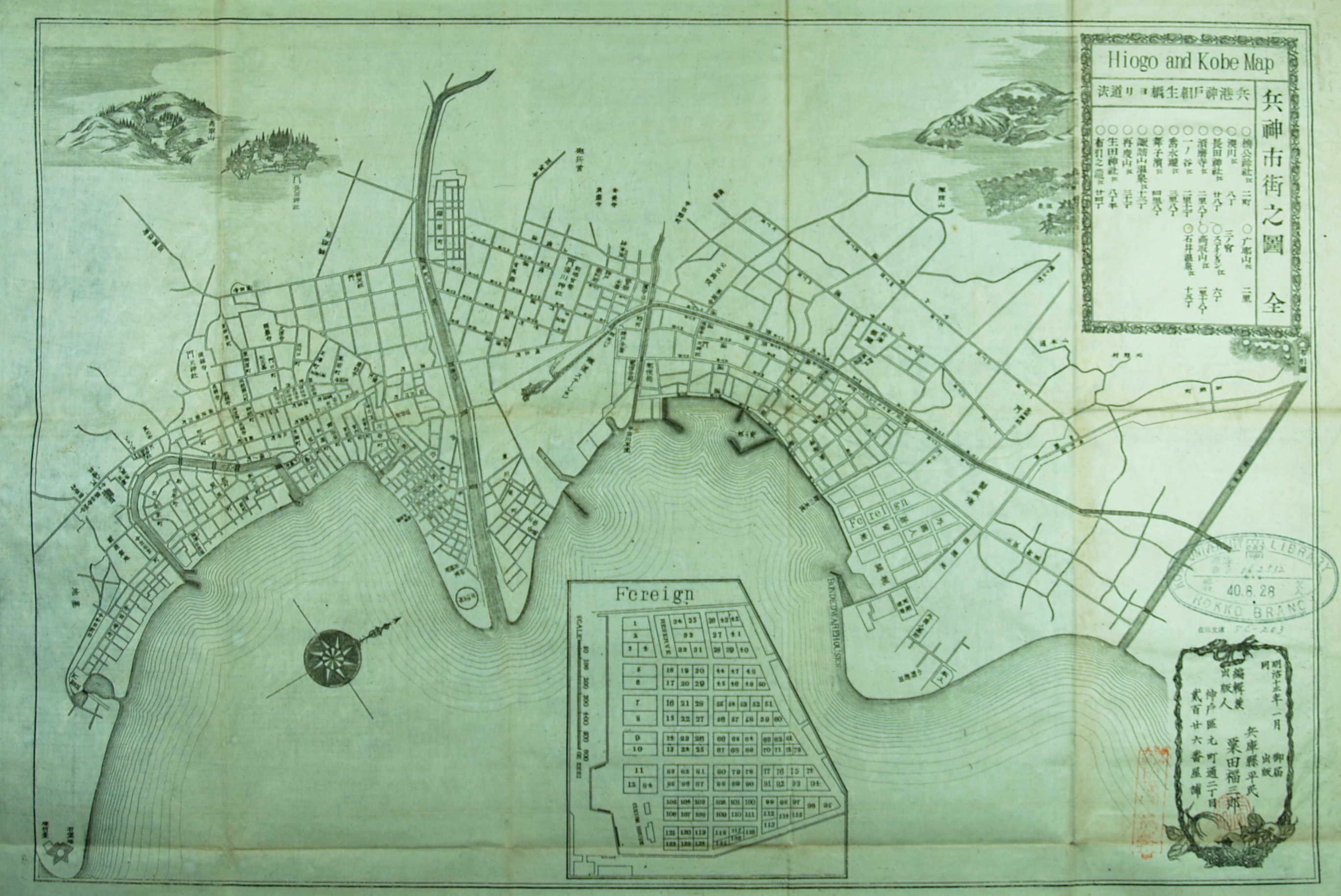
1880 city map of Hyōgo and Kobe. West of the Minato River (the largest river) is the old port of Hyōgo; to its east, the foreign settlement.

On July 29, 1858, the Tokugawa shogunate entered into the Treaty of Amity and Commerce with the United States. In Article 6 of that treaty, the shogunate acknowledged the consular jurisdiction of the U.S. in Japan. In Article 3 it opened Hyōgo port as a treaty port from January 1, 1863, agreeing to establish a fixed area (foreign settlement) to be loaned to foreigners to reside and conduct economic activity in. Before long, the shogunate signed similar treaties known as the Ansei Treaties with the Netherlands, Russia, the United Kingdom, and France. However, these treaties were unable to gain the approval of an imperial edict, and after negotiations with the foreign powers the opening of the port was delayed for five years, until January 1, 1868. The court expressed disapproval for the opening of a port so close to the imperial palace in Kyoto, and even after the Ansei Treaties were approved by imperial edict on December 22, 1865, approval for the port was still not granted. On June 26, 1867, when the treaty port's scheduled opening was six months away, an imperial edict finally acknowledged its establishment. (Note: After assuming office as the 15th Tokugawa shōgun on January 10, 1867, Tokugawa Yoshinobu appealed twice for Imperial approval of the port, but was refused both times. When Yoshinobu made a personal visit to the palace and appealed again, permission was finally granted after a meeting of the court council.)

Even before the issuance of this sanction, the shogunate had been conducting negotiations with the various foreign powers on the topic of the treaty port, and on May 16, 1867, it concluded an agreement (Note: Agreement Establishing Foreign Settlements at the Port of Hyōgo and in Osaka (兵庫港並大坂に於て外国人居留地を定むる取極, Hyōgo-kō narabi Ōsaka ni oite gaikokujin kyoryūchi o sadamuru torikime)) for the establishment of foreign settlements in Hyōgo and Osaka with Britain, the U.S., and France. Article 1 of this agreement established that "a foreign settlement will be established in Hyōgo, between Kōbe-machi (Kōbe-mura) and the Ikuta River, for residents of those countries which have such treaties with the Japanese government ..." (Note: 「日本政府において条約済の各国人兵庫に居留地を神戸町（神戸村）と生田川との間に取極め ...」, "Nihon seifu ni oite jōyakusumi no kakkokujin Hyōgo ni kyoryūchi o Kōbemachi (Kōbemura) to Ikutagawa to no aida ni torikime…") Thus, the foreign settlement was created at Kōbe-mura (神戸村), about 3.5 km east of the Port of Hyōgo. In accordance with this, a new harbor was constructed on the coast at Kōbe-mura and opened to the foreign powers. In 1892, an imperial edict named this harbor the Port of Kobe (神戸港, Kōbe-kō).

Existing documents do not record the reason or chain of events surrounding the opening of the Port of Kobe instead of the Port of Hyōgo. Still, there are a number of theories. In Kokusai Toshi Kōbe no Keifu, Toshio Kusumoto guesses that the shogunate, mindful of the population's preference to keep foreigners at a distance (Note: The 1921 Kōbe Shishi: Honpen Sōsetsu mentions that "At that time, hatred of foreigners was rampant among the Japanese" (外人嫌悪の思想、邦人に蔓延し居たりし当時」, "Gaikokujin ken'o no shisō, hōjin ni man'en shi itari shi tōji").) and wishing to avoid conflict, wanted to avoid opening the already bustling and prosperous port of Hyōgo. (Note: The Port of Hyōgo was at the time operating as an outport of Osaka where many business dealings and transactions took place.) (Note: Furthermore, on February 4, 1868, soon after the port was opened, a line of Bizen Domain troops moving towards Nishinomiya on the Saigoku Kaidō highway, near the settlement, fired on and injured a group of foreigners who tried to cut across their formation. This so-called Kobe Incident posed the new Meiji government's first major international affairs challenge.) Meanwhile, Shinshū Kōbe Shishi: Rekishi-hen 3 and Kokusai Toshi Kōbe no Keifu both conjecture that it was easier to secure a site in the less densely populated area around Kōbe-mura, (Note: The area around the Port of Hyōgo had a population of around 20,000 at the time, compared to about 3,600 in Kōbe-mura.) and this site also allowed the reappropriation of the Kobe Naval Training Center, which had shut down in 1865. A November 1865 survey of the surrounding ocean by an attendant of the British envoy Harry Smith Parkes indicated that the area intended for the foreign settlement, somewhat removed from the old Hyōgo town center, looked out on a small bay that was sufficiently deep and provided an anchorage abundant in nature. Kokusai Toshi Kōbe no Keifu posits from this that this site was Kōbe-mura, and that the foreign powers also found this location more suitable than the existing port of Hyōgo. In any case, in 1892, the port of Kobe was expanded to incorporate the old port of Hyōgo.

The final site of the foreign settlement was located within Kōbe-mura and framed by the Ikuta River to the east, Koi River to the west, and Pacific Ocean to the south, with the Saigoku Kaidō highway to the north. (Note: Shibata Takenaka, who as the Tokugawa shogunate's magistrate of Hyōgo Prefecture was involved with the settlement's creation, planned to establish a detour of the Saigoku Kaidō around the north side of Mount Rokkō. Because the highway touched the north side of the settlement, he wanted to avoid collisions between foreigners and Japanese on the road. The construction was overseen by the shogunal magistrate of Osaka, Saitō Rokuzō. The detour route was to separate from the main highway at Ōkuradani in Akashi, west of the port, and meet it again at the Ishiya River in Ubara-gun to the east. In between, it was to pass through Shirakawa-mura, Aina-mura, Higashiōbu-mura, Mount Maya, and Somadani. The detour was completed before the port opened, but was quickly closed as the new Meiji government built its own separate detour around the settlement. Part of the original detour still remains as a hiking trail called Tokugawa-dō.) It had an area of 78,000 tsubo (about 0.26 km^{2}). Shinshū Kōbe Shishi describes this selection as suggestive of the shogunate's consideration in minimizing contact between foreigners and Japanese to its utmost ability. (Note: 「外国人と日本人との接触を極力回避しようとした幕府の配慮がうかがえる」, gaikokujin to nihonjin to no sesshoku o kyokuryoku kaihi shiyou to shita bakufu no hairyo ga ukagaeru)

=== Construction and administration ===
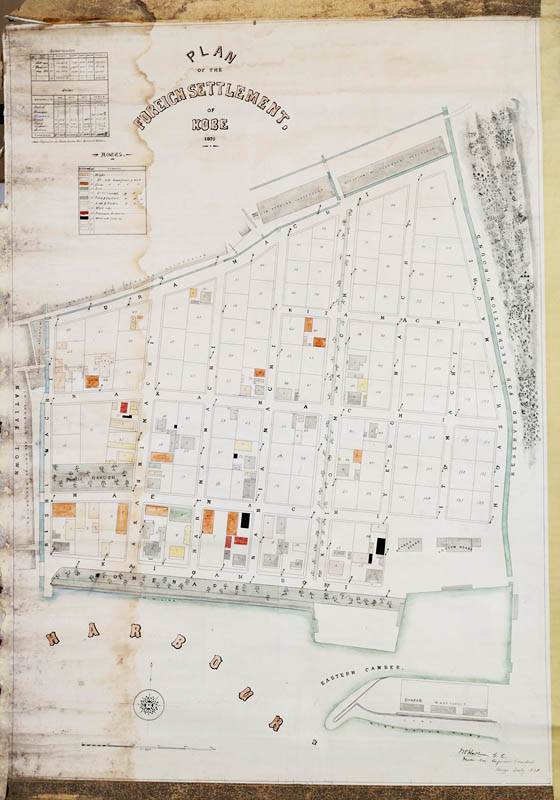
1870 plan of the foreign settlement of Kobe. Full size here (req. Flash 9.)

The Tokugawa shogunate dispatched Shibata Takenaka as magistrate of Hyōgo, putting him in charge of the creation of port and foreign settlement. Shibata immediately took over this task on his arrival in Kōbe-mura, but by January 1, 1868, when the port was to open, all that was complete was the Customs office, three wharfs, and three storehouses. This was also the period during which the government transitioned from the shogunate to the Meiji government, and on November 9, 1867, Shōgun Tokugawa Yoshinobu officially tendered his resignation to the emperor. At first, business related to the port was left to the shogunate government, but on January 3, two days after the port opened, the shogunate was completely abolished and power returned to the emperor. After the shogunate forces lost the Battle of Toba–Fushimi at the end of that January, Yoshinobu retreated from Osaka Castle to Edo, and with Shibata recalled to Edo as well, the construction had to be suspended. The remainder of the construction was carried out under the Meiji government, and around 1872 the building of roads and drains was finished, completing the 8-by-5 grid of streets that defined the area of the settlement.

The Meiji government, which was unwilling to allow foreigners to own land, classified the area instead as under perpetual lease, and the leaseholders were decided by auction. (Note: These auctions were held four times as the construction progressed, between September 10, 1868, and February 2, 1873. The reserve price for one tsubo of land inside the foreign settlement was two gold ryō (two yen), while the land price for one tsubo in the area around the settlement was 12 sen, 5 rin (totaling one-eighth of a yen). In some cases the land was sold for even more than this minimum; for example, Lot 11, which adjoined the Kyō-machi main street, sold for 8 yen, 2 sen to Glover and Co. More than half of the successful bids came from the United Kingdom, whose citizens purchased 64 lots. Germans purchased 23 lots, Dutch 15, Americans and French 11 each, and an Italian purchased one lot. The final lot hosted the office of the Executive Committee, the highest executive organ of the settlement's government.) The perpetual lease continued even after the return of the settlement to Japan, until 1942 (see below). About half of the profits from the auction were absorbed by the government, while the remainder was accumulated for operating expenses by the Municipal Council (居留地会議, Kyoryūchi Kaigi), which the government acknowledged as the highest deciding body in the settlement's government. The self-government of the settlement by its residents continued until the foreign settlement was abolished. The settlement enjoyed 30 years of smooth operation, and relations were generally good between the foreign and Japanese sides. However, it was forbidden for Japanese to live within the foreign settlement, and their entrance to it was also restricted.

In response to the delay in the settlement's construction, the Meiji government allowed foreigners to live outside of the settlement in the area between the Ikuta River to the east, the Uji River to the west, the southern shore of the foreign settlement to the south, and the mountains to the north. This area was referred to as the mixed residential zone (雑居地, zakkyochi), and also existed until the abolishment of the settlement (see below).

=== Development of the settlement and its surroundings ===
After the opening of the port, the settlement was outfitted according to a logical urban plan, with the roads and drains complete around 1872, and bidding on the land lease over by February 7, 1873. The settlement's urban planning led to its evaluation as the "best-planned foreign settlement in the Orient" (by an April 17, 1871, article in the English-language newspaper The Far East). Even so, its surroundings were by no means the object of planned development. The foreign settlement sprouted factories run by foreigners to its northeast, companies and banks to its west, and a Chinatown to its northwest, but as the population in the area near the foreign settlement increased in proportion to its development, a disorderly jumble emerged around it. The scale of the town area increased until in 1890 it connected with the town around the Port of Hyōgo. At the time of the foreign settlement's establishment, the population of Kōbe-mura had been around 3,600 people, but in 1889, when Kōbe-mura was merged with its surroundings to become Kōbe-shi (Kobe City), the new municipality had a population of about 134,700 people. Furthermore, the population of the foreign settlement itself had increased from around 400 English, Germans, French, Dutch, and Ming citizens in 1871 to more than 2,000 in 1890 (see below).

The port possessed meager facilities at first, resembling a natural coastline, but its outfitting continued as well. From April to July 1868, four new wharfs were built between the Ikuta and Uji rivers, and construction was carried out between 1871 and 1872 on breakwaters and expanding the wharves. From April 29 to July 26, 1871, further construction redirected the Ikuta River—not only to prevent the flooding of the settlement, but also to stop the flow of sediment into the middle of the harbor. These actions laid the foundations for the Port of Kobe's later reputation as a good natural harbor. The first round of major restorations that led to its position as Japan's foremost international trade port were decided in 1907, after the foreign settlement's return, and work began in 1908.

=== Return ===
Aiming to amend the terms of the unequal Ansei Treaties formed by the shogunate, the Meiji government embarked on a plan of Westernization. One part of this plan involved holding balls at the Rokumeikan in Tokyo, and Kobe also held its own. In 1887, a ball organized by the governors of Osaka and Hyōgo prefecture, and called "Kobe's Biggest Evening Party Ever" (神戸未曾有の大夜会), took place in a gymnasium owned by the Kobe Regatta & Athletic Club (KRAC). (Note: After the dance in the foreign settlement, more were held in other venues, including the Prefectural Assembly Building. The same thing happened in Tokyo, but the Kansai participants had never even seen a Western-style dance before. Invited though they were to dance, they were greatly perplexed by the actual undertaking. Like the Rokumeikan did in Tokyo, these dances centered on the Kobe settlement's foreign residents and important Kansai personages became symbols of modernization in the Kansai region.)

In 1894, the Meiji government concluded the Anglo-Japanese Treaty of Commerce and Navigation with the United Kingdom, realizing its goal of repealing consular jurisdiction and reclaiming the foreign settlements. The government proceeded to conclude treaties to the same effect with 14 more countries, including the U.S. and France. These treaties took effect on July 17, 1899, and on this date, the Kobe foreign settlement was returned to Japanese hands. The settlement was incorporated into Kobe City, and its administrative and financial autonomy was canceled. Japanese were allowed to enter freely and to reside within the area. The settlement's internal police force, which had been organized by the Municipal Council, was abolished, and its fire brigade, which had been organized directly by residents, was transferred to the control of the city as a regular fire brigade. The government of the settlement was transferred from the highest office within the Municipal Council, the head of the Executive Committee (行事局, gyōji-kyoku) (see below), to commissioned members of the prefectural and city governments. On the old site of the office, a local police station was built, and a committee called the Consultation Committee (相談委員会) (later the Kobe International Committee (神戸国際委員会と改称)) (Note: The Kobe International Committee temporarily disbanded during World War II, but was reestablished after the war as the Kansai International Committee and thereafter carried out activities for the benefit of foreigners living in the Kansai region.) was allowed to be established by the foreigners to help prevent disputes arising from the loss of extraterritoriality. In these ways, the government showed some consideration for the foreigners as well.

=== Disputes over the perpetual lease ===
As discussed above, the Meiji government was unwilling to allow foreigners to own land, and instead lent it to them on a perpetual lease. These leases continued even after the return of the settlement to Japan, (Note: A proposal had also surfaced within the government to convert the perpetual leases within the settlement to land ownership for the leaseholders, but as before, the opinion remained that foreigners should not be allowed to own land, and no compromise could be reached.) but Japan began a policy of taxing the buildings on the land. (Note: Originally, Japanese policy had been that it could not tax buildings on top of perpetually leased land due to consular jurisdiction, but after the return of the settlement this jurisdiction disappeared, and the government concluded that the land was now taxable.) The foreigners were opposed to this on the grounds that they were already being taxed on the land itself, and so were being subjected to double taxation, and in 1902 the Japanese government presented the case to the Permanent Court of Arbitration. In 1905, Japan's plea was discarded, and Japan was disallowed from levying any taxes on buildings on the land under perpetual lease.

With taxation impossible, the Kobe city government moved beginning in 1933 to repeal the perpetual leases. In September 1936, it began conferencing with Yokohama and Nagasaki, which faced similar issues, and the three cities negotiated together with the foreign countries. In March 1937, an agreement was reached to exchange the leases on April 1, 1942, for the rights to the land, in exchange for which the land would be exempt from taxation for five years after the exchange.

Though the settlement was officially returned to Japan by treaty on July 17, 1899, the settlement's history is considered to have continued until its full annulment on April 1, 1942.

=== After the return ===
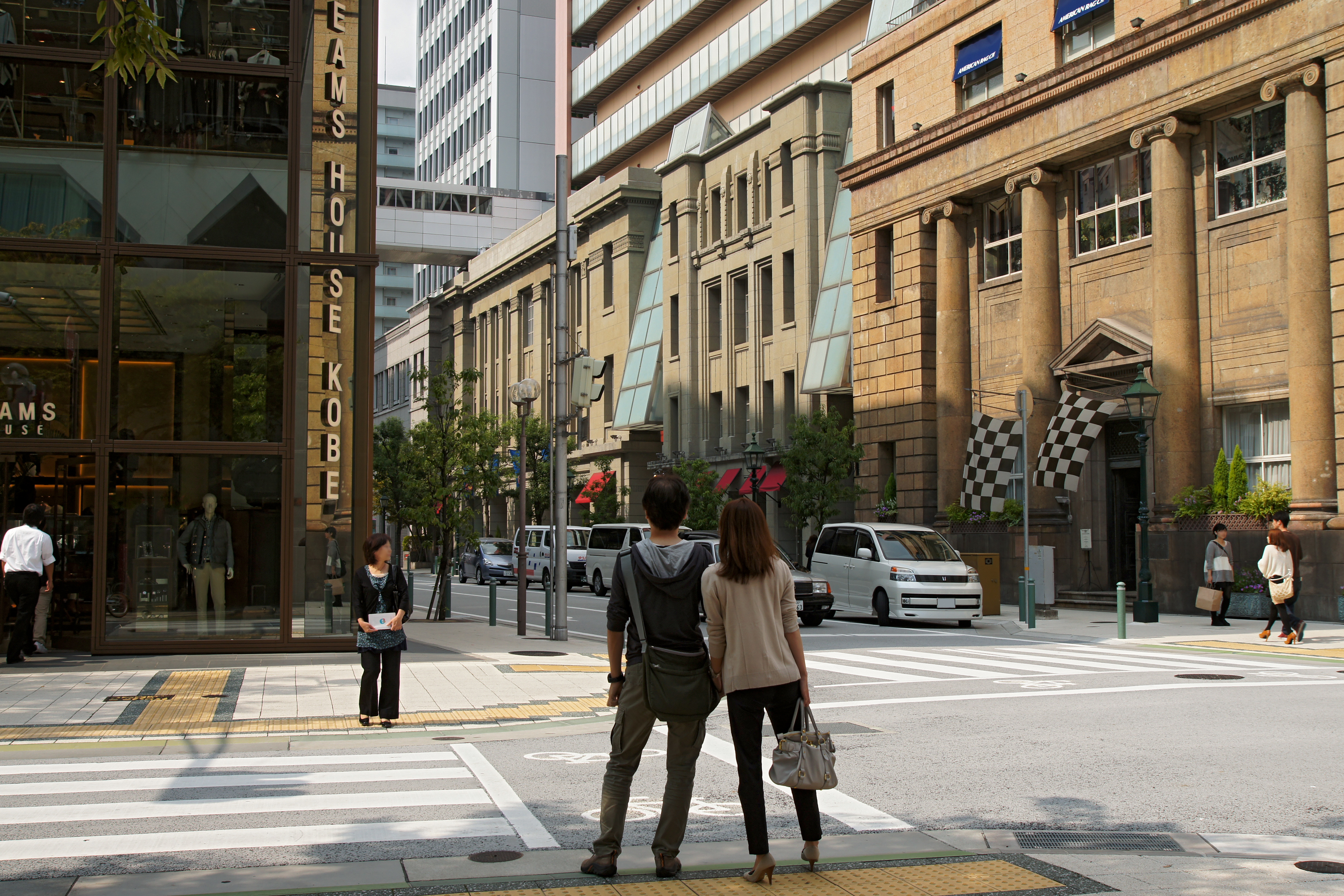
Akashi-machi, in the former foreign settlement (2011)

From the Taishō era until the early Shōwa era, many Japanese firms and banks advanced into the former foreign settlement, which developed as a business district. Meanwhile, foreign trading companies declined around the time of the First World War. Real estate owned by Germans in particular, whose country opposed Japan in the war, was forcibly sold to Japanese, and German firms within the former settlement were succeeded by Japanese ones. By 1931, only 47 of 126 lots in the former foreign settlement were still under perpetual lease to foreigners.

The Bombing of Kobe in World War II resulted in the destruction of 70% of the lots by June 1945, and their restoration did not progress well even after the war ended. In the late 1950s and early 1960s, many companies moved their bases to Tokyo, and the city center of Kobe moved east, deteriorating the former settlement's economic position. But in the late 1970s, the modern Western style architecture and historical scenery of the area led to its reappraisal. (Note: In 1983, the former foreign settlement area was designated under the Kobe City Townscape Law (神戸市都市景観条例) as a Townscape-Shaping Area (都市景観形成地域).) New shops opened that incorporated these factors, and the former foreign settlement became active once more as both a business and shopping district.

== Autonomy and extraterritoriality ==
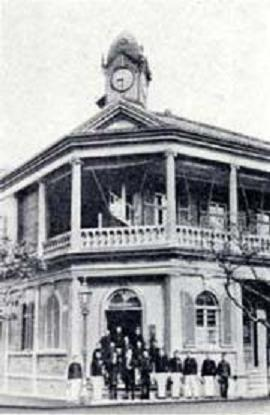
The Executive Committee building at Lot 38

On August 7, 1868, the Meiji government concluded the Arrangement Relative to the Foreign Settlement at the Port of Hiogo and at Osaka (大阪兵庫外国人居留地約定書), in which it acknowledged certain executive and financial rights of foreigners within the settlement. Specifically, the Municipal Council (居留地会議, Kyoryūchi Kaigi) was created as the highest legislative organ in charge of the improvement of infrastructure and public order within the settlement. The Municipal Council was funded in part by a portion of the profits from the auctions of the perpetual leases, and was also allowed to collect land and police taxes. This self-government by the residents of the settlement continued until the abolishment of the settlement—unlike that in Nagasaki and Yokohama, which began with rights to self-government but lost them after a time. (Note: Furthermore, the residents of the foreign settlement held a meeting in January 1870 to discuss the expansion of its autonomy. They reached a resolution to secure the right to levy taxes beyond those permitted by the Arrangement Relative to the Foreign Settlement at the Port of Hiogo and at Osaka (land and police taxes) to pay for administration expenses, as well as the right to establish and enforce laws. These measures were intended to address problems including illegal construction and illegal trade within the settlement. The settlement's tenants sent letters concerning the contents of this resolution to the ministers of their various countries' legations, but most of these ignored them. The only one who replied was minister of the German legation, who argued that the current taxes were sufficient to maintain the established infrastructure, and opposed the request for law-making power on the grounds that it might conflict with the extraterritorial powers of the consulates. Thus, the resolution failed to produce an effect on the settlement's self-government.) Meanwhile, the various foreign powers placed consulates around the settlement to safeguard their financial interests and citizens and exercise their consular jurisdiction.

The Municipal Council's members consisted of consuls from the various foreign powers and the governor of Hyōgo prefecture, along with three elected representatives of the settlement's residents, who formed the Council's Executive Committee (行事局, gyōji-kyoku). The chairman of the Municipal Council was typically a representative of the consulates. The Council's meetings were conducted in English, and the minutes of these meetings were printed in the newspaper. The executive committee was the primary executive organ of the Council. The executive committee consisted of three committee members led by a committee head. The first executive committee head was one Charles Henry Cobden, who was succeeded by Hermann Trotzig from 1872 until the return of the settlement to Japan. When the settlement's police station was established in April 1874, Trotzig also took over as its chief. Important matters were analyzed by committees under the Municipal Council, and their reports formed the basis for the Council's decisions.

To respect the foreigners' self-government, there were limits on the abilities of Japanese to enter the settlement and of Japan to exercise police power in the area. Due to the extraterritoriality enforced by unequal treaties, legal disputes involving Westerners were subject to judgment by their consulates. (Note: An inquiry and preliminary hearings on the 1886 Normanton Incident were held in the Kobe foreign settlement (see below), and locals living near the settlement were occasionally wrapped up in problems involving foreign residents and became involved with extraterritorial judgments themselves.) The right to self-government was tied to the land of the settlement, and thus did not apply outside its boundaries, but the right to consular jurisdiction was tied to the people it applied to, and thus extended even to disputes that occurred outside the settlement. In practice, foreigners claimed the same extraterritoriality outside the settlement that they did inside, which sometimes developed into trouble with the Japanese side.

=== Problems around self-governance and extraterritoriality ===
==== Residence and entrance by Japanese people ====
Japanese were forbidden to reside within the settlement, and at first after the opening of the port were unable to enter it at all, but after 1869 permit-holders were allowed inside. The settlement's internal police force also had a few Japanese police officers.

==== Problems around police power ====
As the Arrangement Relative to the Foreign Settlement at the Port of Hiogo and at Osaka allowed it to levy taxes for policing purposes, the Municipal Council felt that it held the power to police the settlement. However, Hyōgo Prefecture was of the view that the policing of the settlement fell under the jurisdiction of its prefectural police force. This difference in opinion led to a dispute on July 2, 1871, called the Queen vs. Walters Case (女王対ウォータース事件).

On July 2, 1871, a Hyōgo prefectural police officer brought a woman suspected of prostitution in to the station from within the foreign settlement. Once the investigation determined that she was a servant of the Englishman Mr. Walters, who lived within the settlement, she was released. However, Walters was angry over the affair, and on the next day, July 3, he trapped two police officers he believed to have been involved in her arrest within his estate. The case fell under consular jurisdiction and was judged by the English consul Abel Gower, who judged that the Japanese officers were unable to exercise police power in the settlement—not even to patrol it, let alone arrest anyone. Thus, Walters was not found guilty of obstruction of justice against the officers, but only of false imprisonment. This judgment clarified that only the settlement police, under the authority of the executive committee, was allowed to undertake police action in the settlement. Hyōgo Prefecture remained unable to exercise these powers in the settlement until its return in 1899.

==== Inquiry and preliminary hearings on the Normanton Incident ====
The initial inquiry and preliminary hearings on the 1886 Normanton Incident fell under the consular jurisdiction of the Kobe foreign settlement. On October 24, the cargo ship Normanton, belonging to a steamboat company at the Yokohama settlement, sank in the waters off the coast of Wakayama Prefecture. The boat's 25 Japanese passengers, who were riding along with the cargo, all died. Although 11 British crewmen boarded lifeboats and survived, not a single Japanese passenger made it out alive, and so suspicion emerged that the captain and crew had been negligent in saving the passengers. Under the consular jurisdiction guaranteed by the Ansei Treaties, the hearings for the case were heard over five days beginning on November 1 in the Kobe foreign settlement, but the British consul James Troup found the crew innocent. The governor of Hyōgo Prefecture, Utsumi Tadakatsu, was dissatisfied with the verdict and accused the captain of murder. On November 20, preliminary hearings were held on this charge in the foreign settlement, and on December 8 public hearings were held in Yokohama; both of these found the captain guilty. As the initial inquiry over the incident had found the crew blameless, doubts and criticism of the right to consular jurisdiction arose domestically in Japan, along with a wave of anti-British sentiment. This initial inquiry is a black spot in the otherwise positive history of foreign–Japanese relations in the Kobe foreign settlement.

== Townscape ==
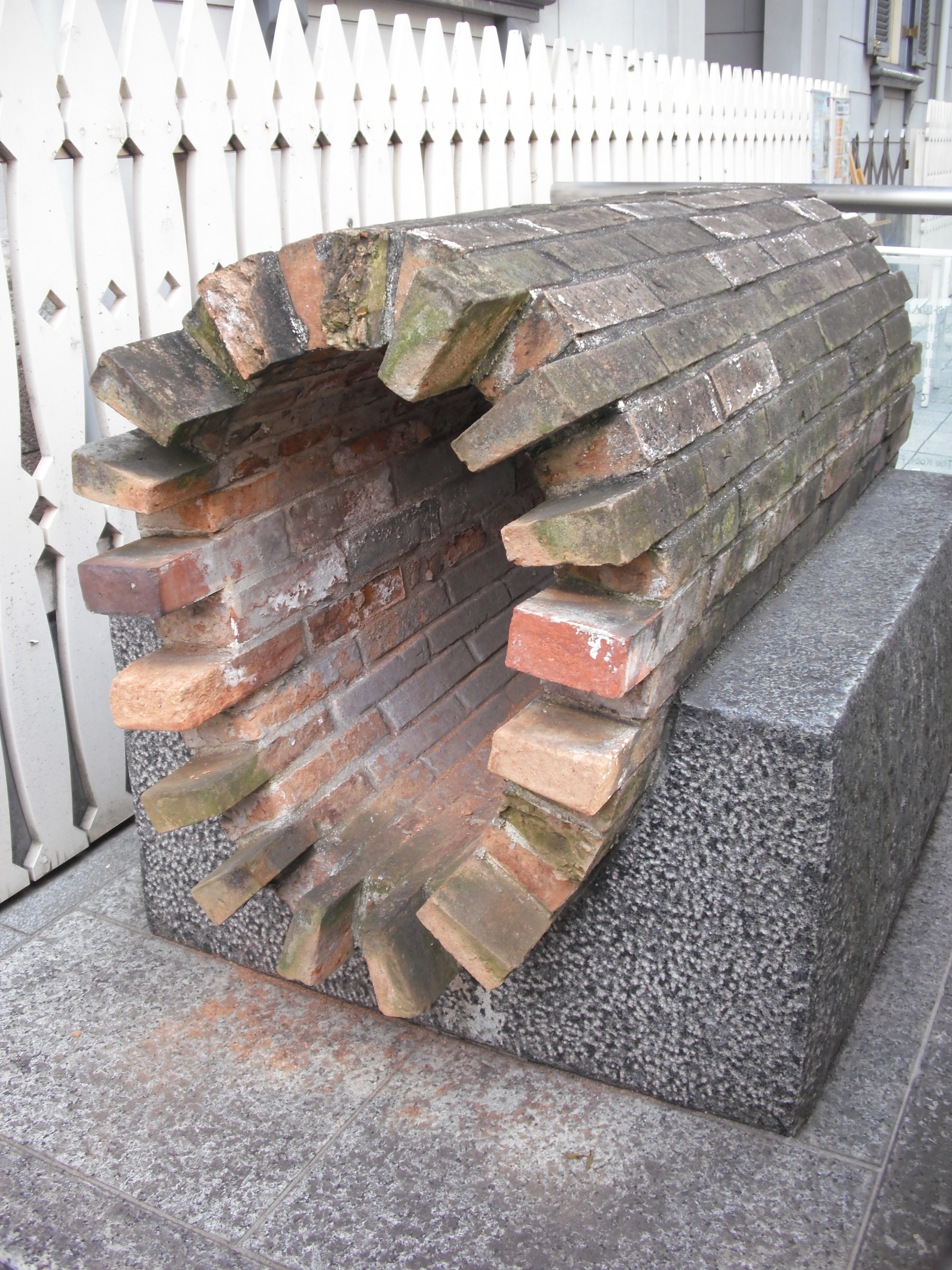
A drainage pipe from the old foreign settlement, on display outside the former American consulate

Because the Port of Hyōgo opened about nine years after those of Yokohama and Nagasaki, the Kobe foreign settlement was built on a logical urban plan that leveraged the construction and design experiences of those earlier settlements. On April 17, 1871, the English-language journal The Far East described Kobe as the "best-planned foreign settlement in the Orient". (Note: However, not everyone approved of the area's pronounced Western influence. The Russian philosopher Raphael von Koeber commented that "the blind imitation of European and American vice and ignorance is visible everywhere", and the British writer Rudyard Kipling called it "a raw American town", "hideously American in externals".)

The completed townscape of the settlement possessed the following characteristics:

- With the Ikuta River to the east, Uji River to the west, and sea to the south, the settlement was surrounded by rivers and the ocean on three sides. However, the rivers to the east and west were subjected in the 1870s to redirection and conversion into culverts.
- 8 roads running north to south and 5 running east to west (Note: The roads running north to south were, from west to east: Nishimachi, Akashimachi, Harimamachi, Naniwamachi, Kyōmachi (or Kiomachi), Edomachi (or Yedomachi), Itōmachi, and Higashimachi. Those running from east to west were, from north to south: Uramachi, Kitamachi, Nakamachi, Maemachi, and Kaigan-dōri. The areas adjoining these roads were given names based on the roads'. However, these names were not used officially until after the return of the settlement.) split the settlement into 22 blocks, which were further subdivided into a total of 126 lots. Each lot had an area of between 200 and 300 tsubo (about 660 to 990 m^{2}), and the total buildable area of the settlement, subtracting the roads, amounted to 49,645 tsubo (about 16.4 hectares) as of 1885.
- The roads were split into roadways and sidewalks.
- Drainage pipes were laid underground along the roads, running north to south and into the sea. The pipes were made of wedge-shaped bricks, packed together with mortar into a cylindrical shape. (Note: When the city of Kobe was laying down new rain drainage pipes in 1975, they discovered brick drainage pipes underground in the former concession area, around Akashimachi and Itōmachi. It became clear that these pipes from the foreign settlement days had been functioning for more than a hundred years.)
- The roads were lined with trees and streetlights. The electrical lines were run underground, meaning that there was no need for utility poles to be raised.
- The seaside road on the south of the settlement, Kaigan-dōri, was outfitted as a promenade: lined with pine trees and a lawn.

=== Gas lamps ===
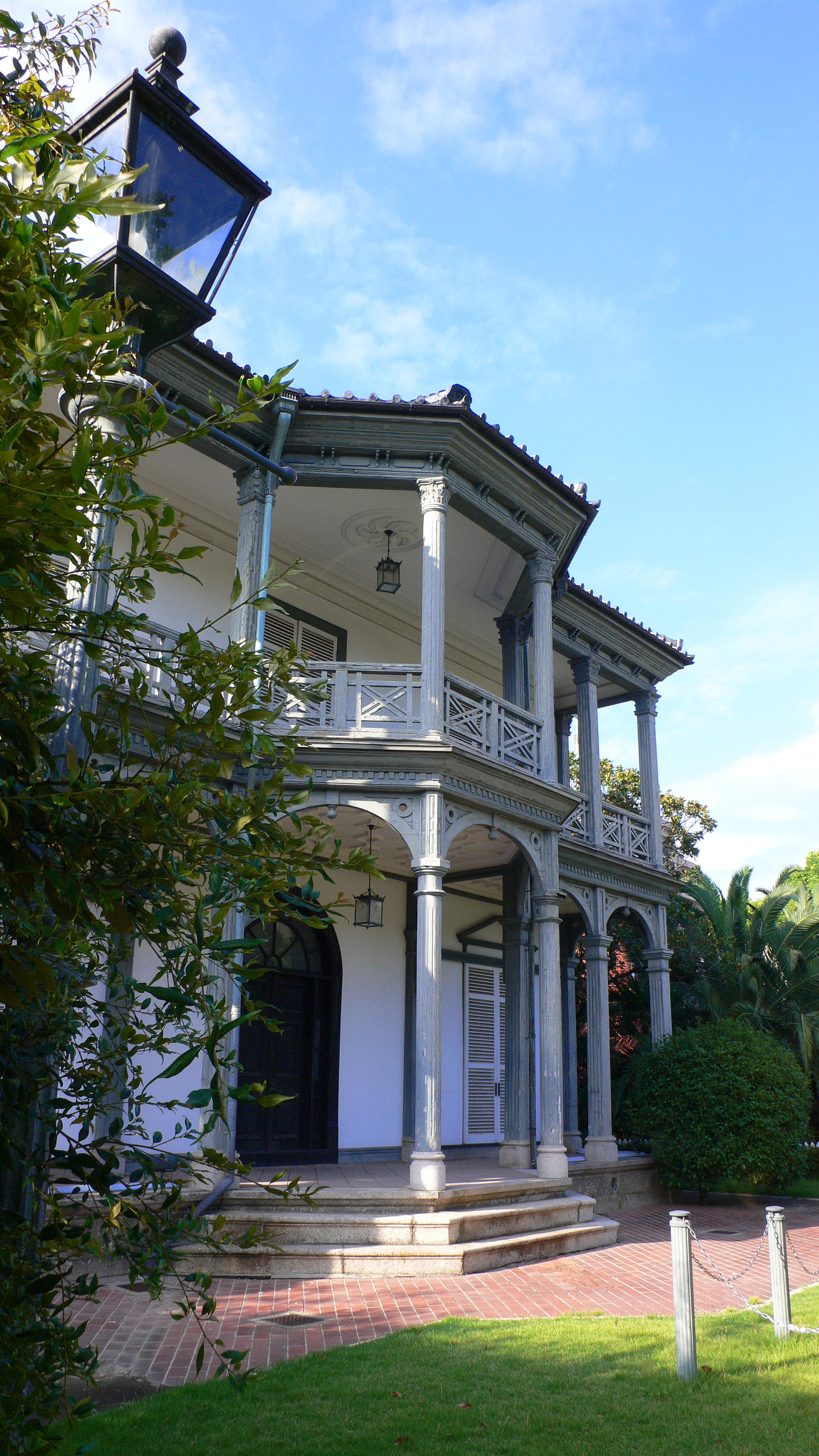
Gas lamps at the former Hassam residence

In November 1874, Brown and Co.—a predecessor of Osaka Gas, established with the investment of many of the firms in the settlement—began supplying gas to the settlement, the first area in Hyōgo to receive it. (Note: Gas did not become available outside of the foreign settlement until 1901.) Gas lamps were set up inside the settlement to replace the previous oil lamps. Of the 94 gas lamps from the period, two are in front of the former Hassam residence, while another is at the Meiji-mura museum and theme park. Reconstructions are also placed around the Kobe City Museum and the Kobe branch of the Daimaru department store chain.

Electricity became available in Kobe from November 1888, and electric lamps were put up around the city, but there was opposition within the foreign settlement, mainly from Brown and Co. This delayed the introduction of both electricity supply and electric lamps to the settlement. Additionally, the foreign residents insisted that elevated power cables would ruin the beauty of the town, and had the lines in the settlement laid underground. Even after the return of the settlement to Japan, these wires remained underground, and utility poles were never erected in the area.

=== Architectural style ===
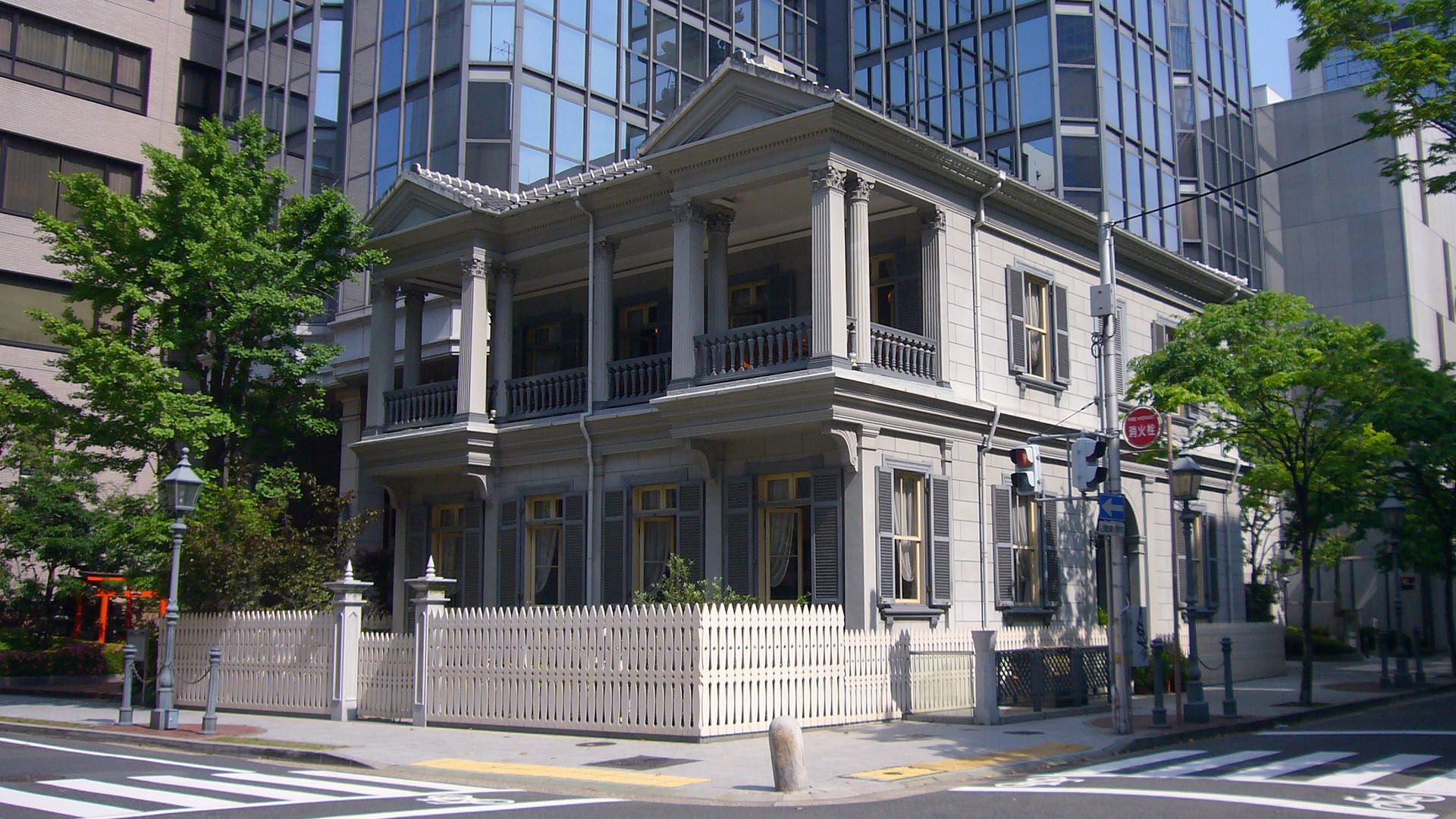
The former American consulate

The first buildings erected in the settlement were tinged with the classical style. The former American consulate in Kobe at No. 15 was an exemplar of this style, with two floors and a veranda adorned with columns on the second floor. Until the mid-19th century, the classical style was overwhelmingly predominant in the foreign settlements of East Asia.

In the 1890s, the English architect Alexander Nelson Hansell's activity brought change to the current fad. Hansell, influenced by Gothic Revival architecture, favored designs that featured exposed brick. Beginning with the rebuilding of the Kobe Club in the foreign settlement, Hansell worked on the designs of a great number of buildings, including branches of HSBC and Jardine Matheson, as well as the German consulate.

Unlike the Yokohama settlement, which was populated by many examples of faux-Western Giyōfū architecture, all of the buildings in the Kobe settlement were constructed under the direction of Western architects, and most of the clients who ordered construction were foreign-owned enterprises. Meanwhile, from the early 1900s on, many of the architects employed by Japanese government administrations and business in Kobe were Japanese. These included graduates of the Imperial College of Engineering, like Tatsuno Kingo, Sone Tatsuzō, and Kawai Kōzō, as well as Yamaguchi Hanroku, who studied architecture abroad in France at the École Centrale Paris. Architects like these, who studied under the Englishman Josiah Conder at the Imperial College like Tatsuno, (Note: Students who graduated between 1879 and 1886 were taught by Conder.) or overseas like Yamaguchi, laid the development for the advancement of architecture in Japan during the Meiji period. However, these Japanese architects employed in Kobe at large and the foreign ones employed in the foreign settlement were clearly demarcated by their different client groups, and interaction between them was sparse.

=== Lodging ===
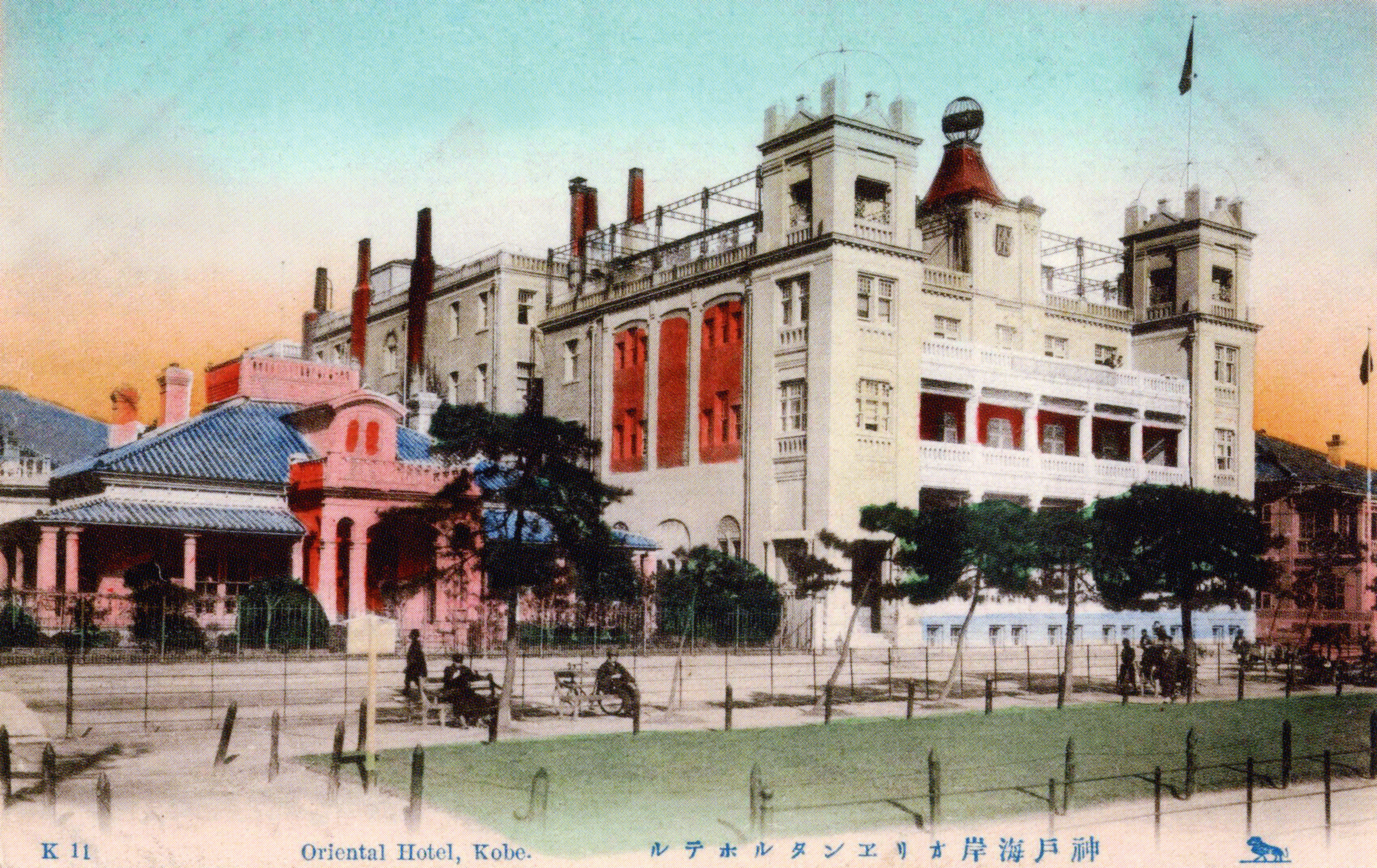
The Oriental Hotel (Kaigan-dōri Lot 6 location, completed in 1907)

The first hospitality facility in the Kobe foreign settlement was the Global Hotel, which opened in 1868, though its location and the date of its closure are unknown. Various other facilities followed. The most famous among these was the Oriental Hotel, which opened sometime before August 3, 1870, in Lot 79. The Oriental Hotel was home to the office of the social Union Club from 1870 until around 1881, when Club Concordia took over the space, and on September 23, 1870, the KRAC's founding meeting was held there. The Oriental Hotel purchased Lot 80 in 1888 and moved its main building there, and at this time enjoyed critical acclaim for the culinary efforts of its French chef Louis Begeux. After the settlement's return, the Oriental Hotel's operation continued unbroken despite its relocation. It was destroyed by the Great Hanshin earthquake in 1995 but reopened in 2010.

=== Construction on the neighboring rivers ===
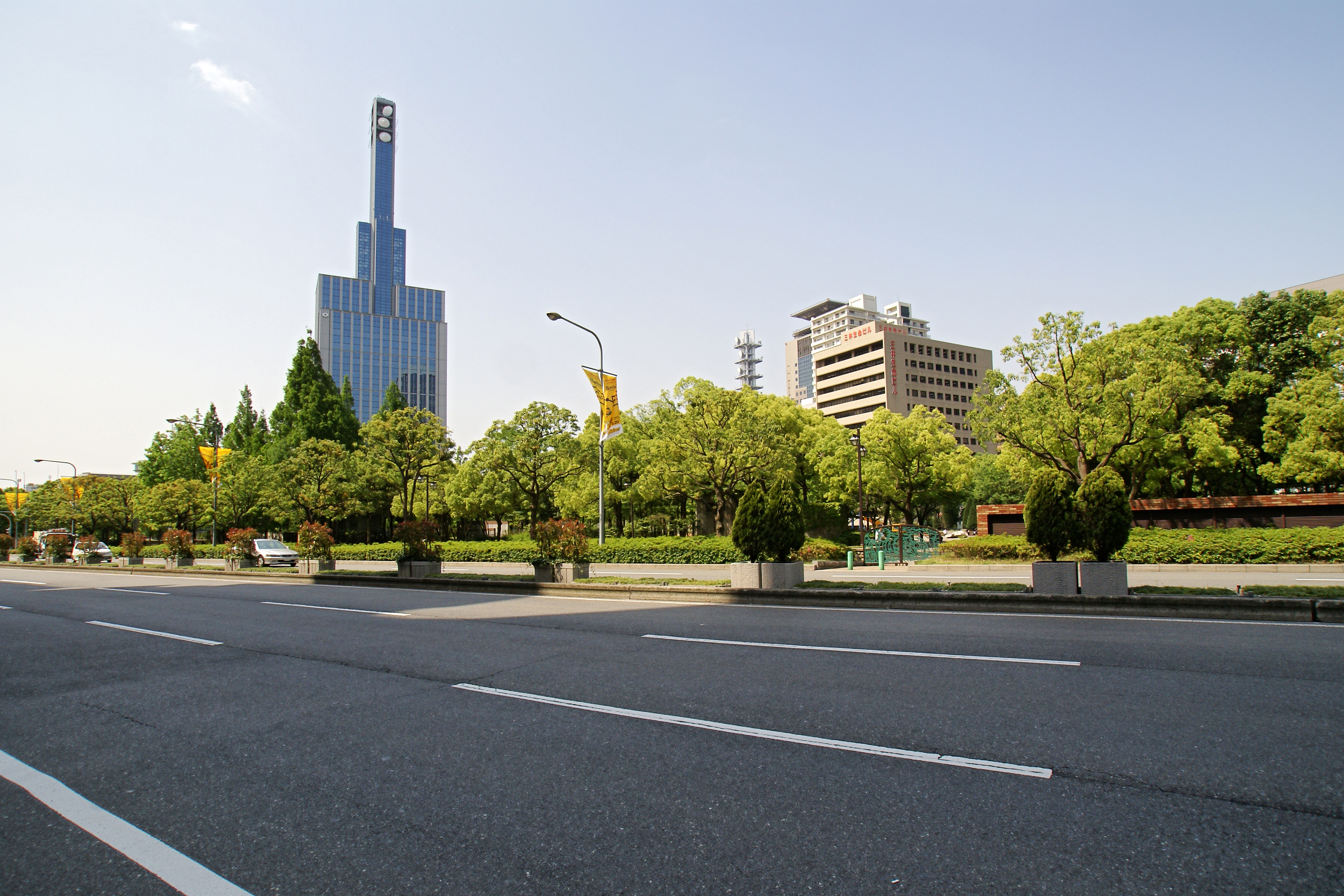
Flower Road, on the old course of the Ikuta River

The two rivers that bordered the settlement on its initial construction were both problematic. The Ikuta River to the east had low banks and frequently flooded the settlement, while the Koi River to the west was hated as an obstruction to traffic.

The Meiji government conducted construction on the Ikuta River from April 9 to July 26, 1871, to redirect the flow of the river eastward, creating a straight new Ikuta River that flowed directly south from the Nunobiki Falls upstream to Onohama-chō in Kobe. The old riverbed was built over and the street called Flower Road was built atop it, alongside a park shared by foreigners and Japanese that later became Higashi Yūenchi park. Some of the bank was left as hill, on which Kobe City Hall was later built. One portion of the reclaimed land was called Kanō-chō, in honor of the late Edo and Meiji-period merchant Kanō Sōshichi. The British engineer and architect John William Hart, who had been involved with the construction of the settlement, was also involved with the remodeling of the river.

In the case of the Koi River, the settlement's foreign residents appealed to Hyōgo prefecture and the central government to cover the river, offering to pay half of the construction costs involved. The construction was carried out from October 1874 to January 1875. In 1909, the river was completely covered with concrete, becoming a culvert. Later, a road called Koikawa-suji was laid atop it.

== Foreigners outside the settlement ==
The Kobe foreign settlement's residents were allowed to live and operate in a certain area outside of its bounds.

=== Mixed residential zone ===
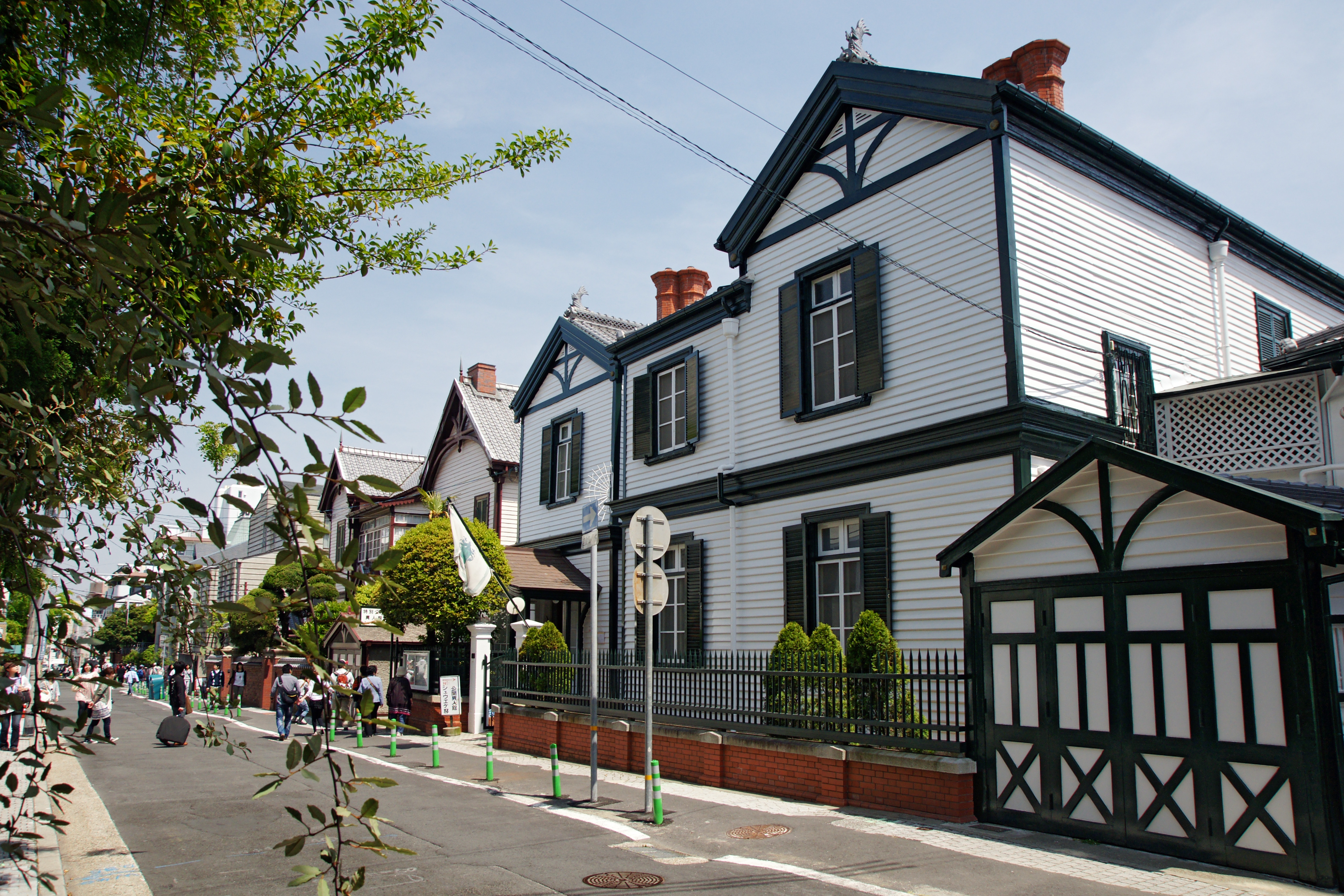
Yamamoto-dōri, also known as "Ijinkan Street"

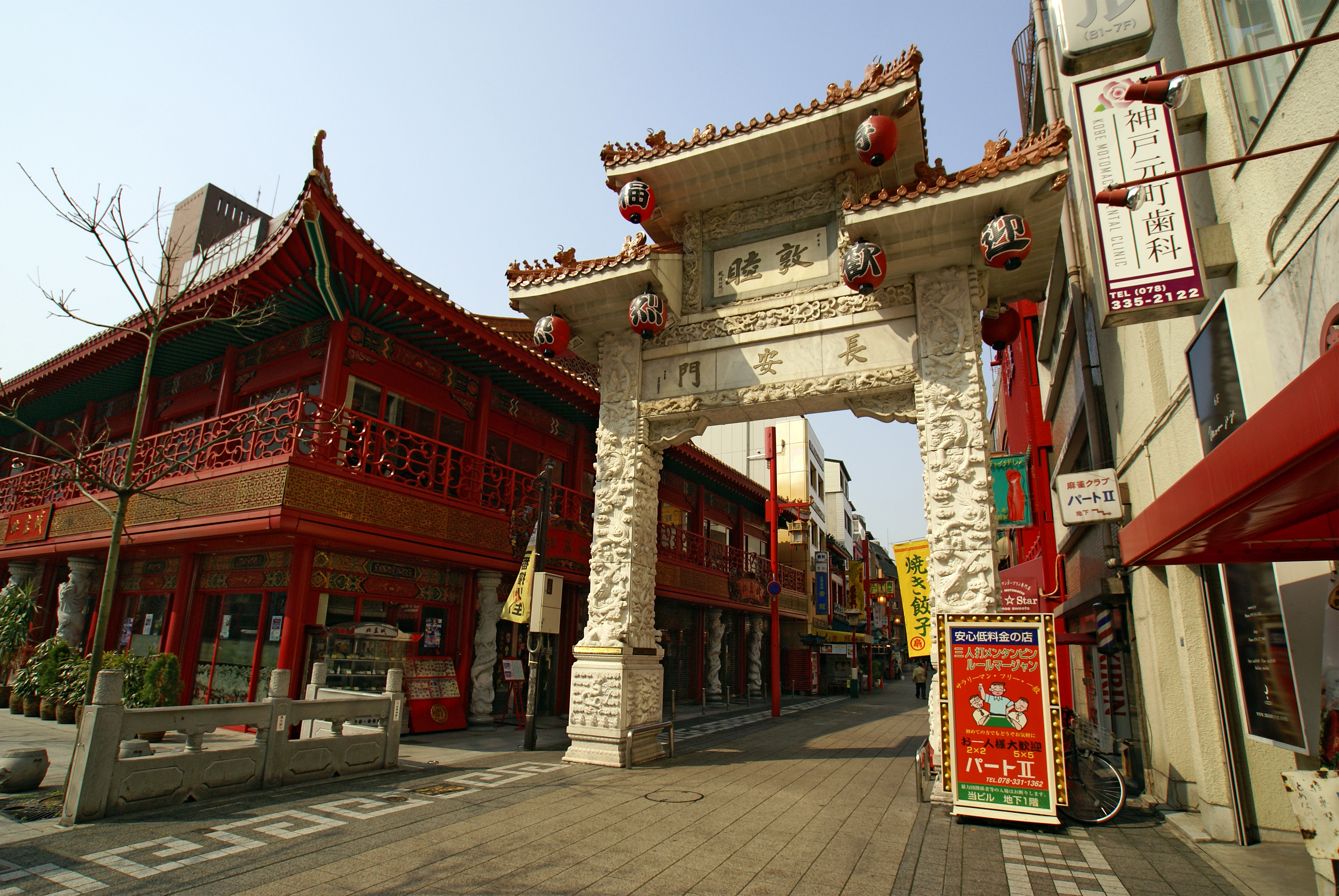
Choanmon Gate, at the eastern entrance of the Nankinmachi Chinatown, faces Koikawa-suji, the old western border of the concession.

The initial opening of the port on January 1, 1868, only established a tiny area of land and facilities. The Meiji government had publicly inherited the treaties and agreements concluded by the shogunate, but in the May 16, 1867, agreement, the shogunate had agreed that in the event that the settlement became too cramped, it would either expand the area of the settlement or allow Japanese people to rent residences to foreigners. Therefore, the Meiji government from March 30, 1868, allowed foreigners to reside in the area between the Ikuta River to the east, the Uji river to the west, the coast to the south, and the mountains to the north. Within this area, foreigners could lease land and lease or purchase houses. This area was known as the mixed residential zone (雑居地, zakkyochi). After the very early days of the zone's existence, it was not allowed to grant perpetual leases on land within this zone to foreigners. Leases were limited initially to five-year intervals, which was later expanded to 25 years. The mixed residential zone was set up on a temporary basis to compensate for the late opening of the settlement, but even after the settlement's completion, its foreign residents soon overwhelmed its internal capacity. Fearing that it would be asked to expand the settlement if the mixed residential zone were removed, the Meiji government left the zone intact until the abolishment of the settlement. As of the end of 1885, the mixed residential zone had an area of 26,756 tsubo (about 8.8 hectares).

As Qing China had no treaty with Japan at the time of the port's opening, its citizens were unable to reside within the settlement and were limited to the mixed residential zone. This led to the development of a Chinatown to the west of the foreign settlement. After the signing of the Sino-Japanese Friendship and Trade Treaty on September 13, 1871, they were able to reside within the settlement, and the number of Chinese residents in both the mixed zone and the settlement itself increased. These Chinese acted as neutral parties called baiben (買弁) in trade conducted by the settlement's foreign firms. They also used their channels to China to play a major role in the export of matches to both countries.

Many old foreign residences, called ijinkan, remain as popular tourist attractions in the old mixed residential zone. The existing Kobe Chinatown, Nankinmachi, is in the area west of the foreign settlement where the Qing Chinatown first developed. In the mixed residential zone, foreigners and Japanese lived side by side, producing international exchange on the level of daily life. Kobe's current status as a city where multiple ethnicities and cultures coexist arose from this relationship.

=== Treaty limits ===
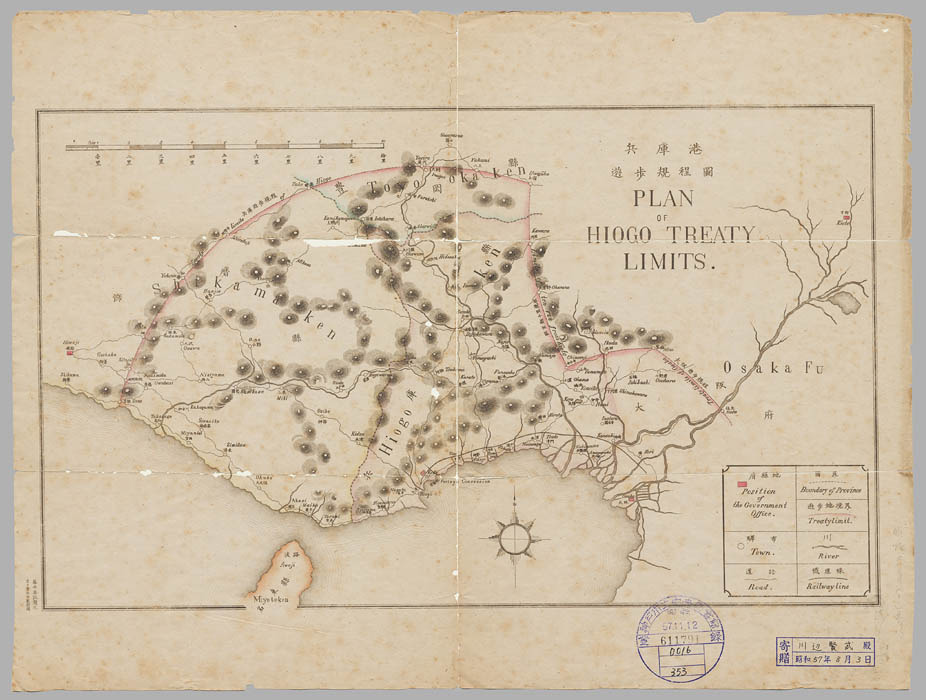
Plan of Hiogo Treaty Limits (pub. 1875). The treaty area is outlined in red.

The Ansei Treaties included stipulations restricting the area of activity open to foreign residents, and in Kobe this consisted of an area of ten ri (about 40 km) around the Hyōgo prefectural office. In 1869, the prefecture released regulations concretely defining this 10-ri area in terms of actual travel distance, bounded by the sea to the south and by villages on all sides: to the east by Ōbe, Sakane, Hirai, and Nakashima in Kawabe District, the west by Sone and Amida in Innami District, and the north by Ōharano-mura in Kawabe District, Kawahara, Yado, Yakamishimo, and Inugai in Taki District, and Takō, Myōrakuji, and Yokō in Taka District. However, the foreign countries instead interpreted the ten ri as a radius of direct distance, expanding the treaty limits to encompass the entirety of Innami to the west and Kawabe, Taki, and Taka districts to the north. The space beyond this area was accessible to foreigners only for recreation and scholarship, and when foreigners did enter it they were obligated to carry a travel license from the prefectural office. In actuality, though, foreigners often left the treaty area without permission on excursions, which frequently caused trouble for the prefecture. When the settlement was returned in 1899, foreigners were permitted to reside and travel freely within Japan.

== Trade ==
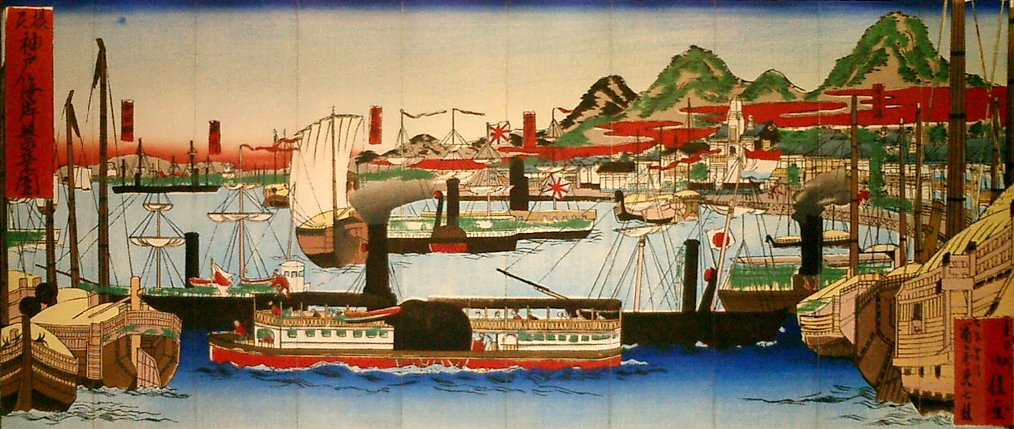
An ukiyo-e portrait of the Port of Kobe just after its opening (Sesshū Kōbe Kaigan Han'ei no Zu (摂州神戸海岸繁栄図), by Hasegawa Sadanobu II)

The port prospered with trade from immediately after its opening. The initial trade consisted of exports supplied by Japanese merchants to foreign ones, and imports sold from foreign merchants to Japanese ones. This was because foreigners were not allowed to buy export goods or sell their own imports outside the settlement, while Japanese merchants lacked the know-how to conduct business directly with businessmen overseas. Japanese merchants trying to sell goods to foreigners or buy goods from them carried out their negotiations through intermediaries, either Japanese clerks or Chinese baiben. As many of the foreign merchants were high-handed and forceful in their negotiations, and the Japanese were unaccustomed to trading with foreign countries and unfamiliar with the state of the world outside Japan, Japanese merchants were frequently manipulated into buying and selling goods at disadvantageous prices.

Over time, as Japanese merchants and firms began to conduct their transactions directly with their counterparts, the power of the foreign merchants declined. At first, foreign merchants were involved in a full 100% of the foreign trade at the Port of Kobe, but in 1897, immediately before the settlement's return, they were only involved in 65% of transactions, and by 1907, after the return, their involvement had dropped to 50%, and 40% in 1911. Foreign merchants withdrew from the settlement after its return and were replaced by the Japanese firms that were now allowed to open offices within its old borders. In 1931, foreigners held leases on only 47 of the former settlement's 126 lots.

The principal export goods were tea, rice, and matches. At first, the export tea came from Kyoto, but tea produced in western Japan was gradually promoted, and structures for its export came into place. Rice was exported from Kobe in sufficient quantity to become the standard rice in London's grain market. Full-scale match manufacturing in Kobe began in the late 1870s, at which point those matches also started being exported. The value of match exports from the Port of Kobe increased rapidly beginning in the late 1880s, increasing until they comprised more than nine-tenths of Japan's total match exports. These exports were directed primarily at China at first, but over time expanded to reach Australia, Europe, and America.

The principal imports were cotton and woolen textiles like calico and cotton velvet. In 1896, the Kobe resident Takahashi Shinji imported a Kinetoscope through Rynel and Co., which occupied Lot 14, and held Japan's first public showings of moving pictures. From 1894 until the end of the Meiji period, Kobe hosted the highest level of imports of all Japan's ports.

== Culture ==
=== Food ===
==== Ramune ====
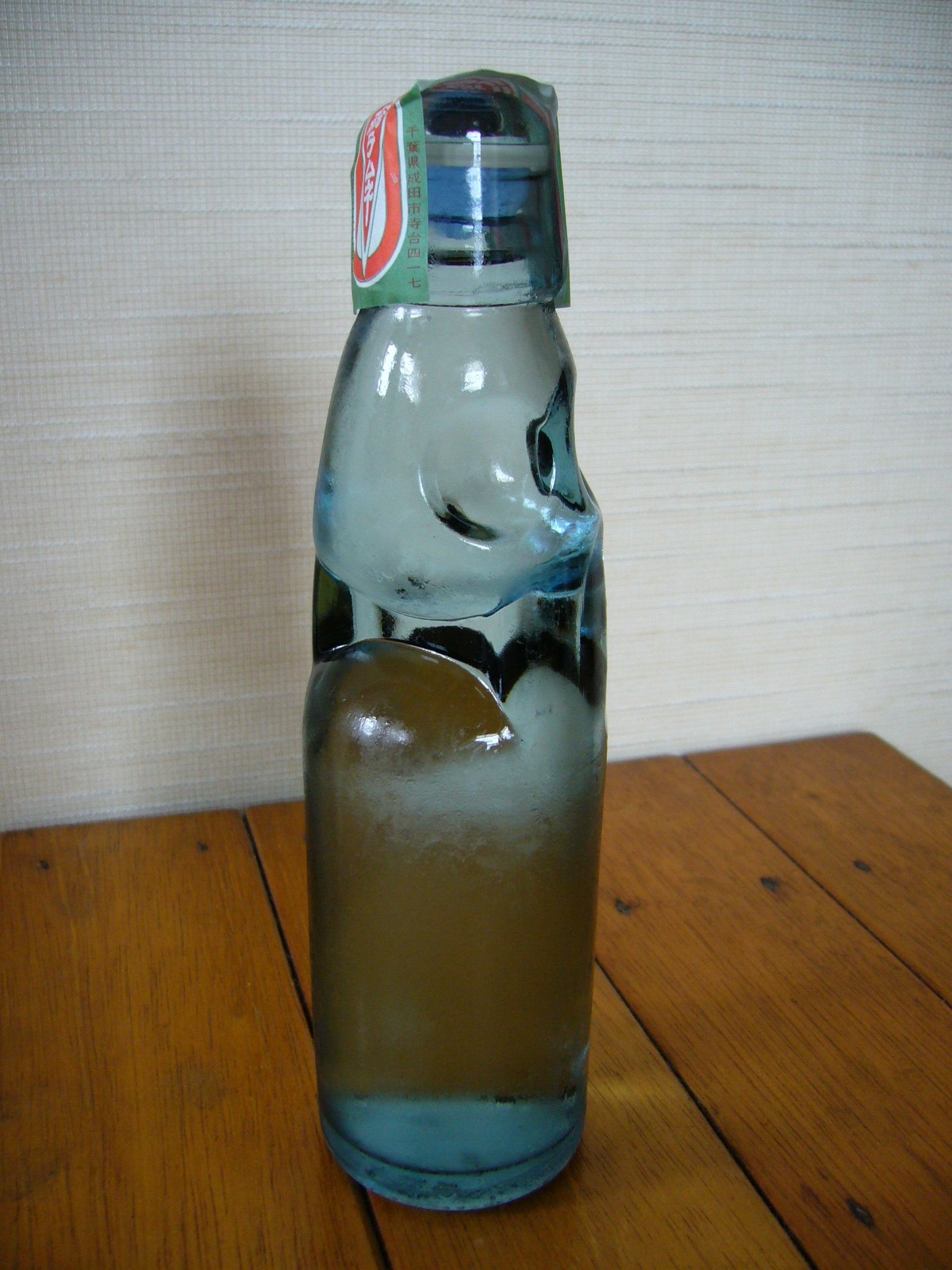
Ramune

The Kobe foreign settlement is said to be the birthplace of the popular Japanese drink Ramune. (Note: Records show that Ramune was produced and sold in Nagasaki before the opening of the Port of Hyōgo, but it was not at that point widely distributed.) Sim and Co., managed by Alexander Cameron Sim, began to produce and distribute Ramune under the name Jūhachi-ban (18番), which was based on the company's location in Lot 18 of the foreign settlement. When Sim began selling Ramune, cholera was prevalent in Japan, and demand increased in 1886 when the Yokohama Mainichi Shinbun reported that "beverages containing gas prevent infection". (Note: 「ガスを含有した飲料で感染が防げる」, "gasu o ganyū shita inryō de kansen ga fusegeru") A contemporary report by the Osaka Nippō stated that Sim's Ramune had "sold out completely". (Note: 「払い底になった」, haraisoko ni natta)

==== Beef ====
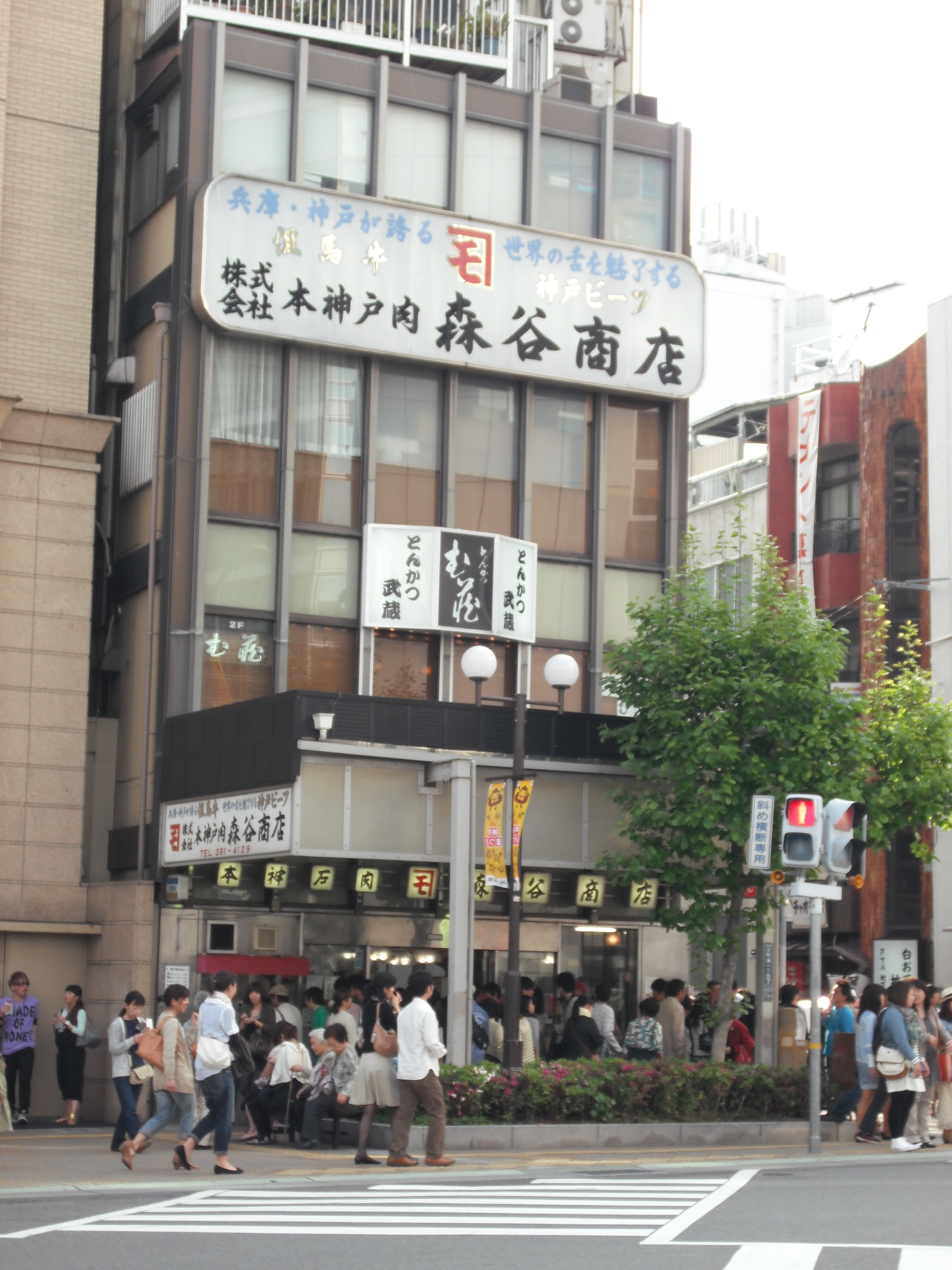
Moritani Shōten, located on Koikawa-suji

Before the opening of the port, beef produced in Tanba, Tango, and Tajima and purchased by merchants at the Yokohama foreign settlement was highly valued among foreigners. After the port opened, its foreign residents enthusiastically sought out this beef, but as beef was not customarily consumed in Japan at the time, no systems existed to provide enough supply. Therefore, the foreigners themselves opened slaughterhouses and butchers. The first of these was opened by the British businessman Edward Charles Kirby, who at some point rented a slaughterhouse to the east of the Ikuta River, opened a butcher along the coastal road Kaigan-dōri, and began to sell beef. Other records state that in 1868, an Englishman by the name of Teboul (テボール) opened a slaughter house beside the Ikuta River. In 1871, Japanese people began supplying beef, and after 1875 its provision was mostly monopolized by Japanese. In 1894 foreigners withdrew completely from the local beef industry.

Beginning immediately after the port's opening, Japanese in the areas around the settlement began handling beef for business and consuming it as food. The beef hotpot (sukiyaki) restaurant Kanmon Gekka-tei (関門月下亭), which opened in 1869 in the Motomachi area within the mixed residential zone, is thought to have been the first Japanese-managed beef restaurant in Kobe. The oldest beef shops were Ōi Nikuten and Moritani Shōten, which opened in 1871. The founder of Ōi Nikuten, Kishida Inosuke, invented beef cooking techniques unique from those of the West, preserving beef in miso, or in soy as a tsukudani dish. In the late 1870s the businessman Suzuki Kiyoshi developed canned beef flavored with soy sauce and sugar, which became a nationwide hit product.

==== Western confectionery ====
Western confectionery was produced after the opening of the port to cater to foreign residents and travelers. In 1882, in Motomachi 3-chōme within the mixed residential zone, Ninomiya Seijin-dō was founded as the first Western confectionery shop in Kobe. In Gōshō shinpei minato no sakigake (豪商神兵湊の魁), published the same year, introduced a Western confectionery shop called Sangoku-dō near the Aioi Bridge. In 1897, a man named Yoshikawa Ichizō opened a branch of the Tokyo confectionery Fūgetsu-dō in Motomachi, the first full-scale Western confectionery in Kobe, which sold castella, waffle, profiterole, candy, and chocolate.

=== Christianity ===
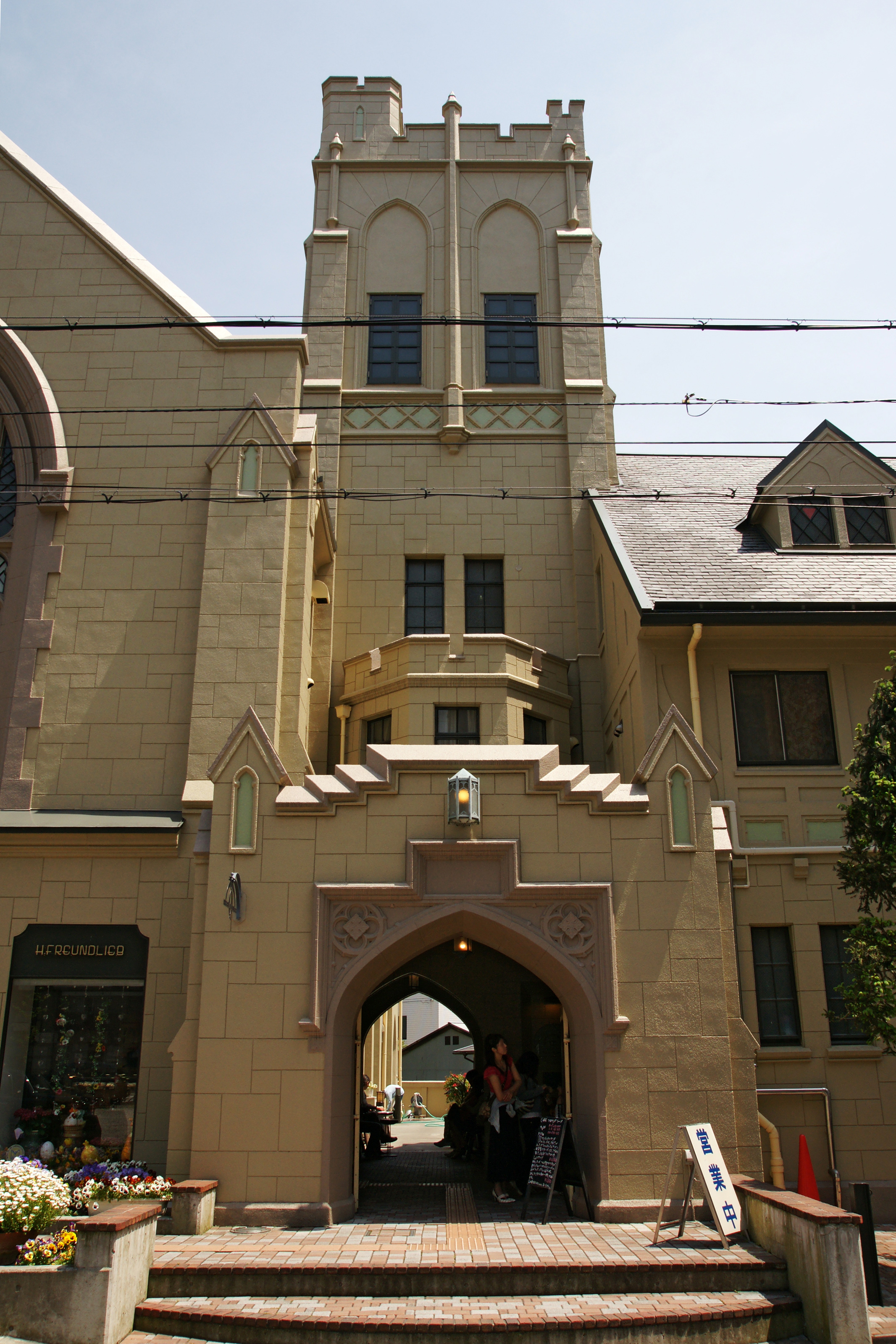
The former Kobe Union Church

The Meiji government continued the shogunate's prohibition on Christianity until February 24, 1873. However, the Ansei Treaties guaranteed freedom of religion for foreigners, and religious activity by missionaries within the foreign settlement was energetic from its inception.

On August 9, 1868, the missionary Pierre Mounicou of the Paris Foreign Missions Society began holding weekly Catholic services every Sunday at a temporary place of worship on the Saigoku Kaidō. In March of the next year he built a rectory on Lot 37 and moved the services there. However, as many of foreign residents were Protestant, attendance was not remarkably high. Mounicou continued on, building a chapel on Lot 37, and the church was consecrated on April 17, 1870. In 1923, the church was relocated to Nakayamate-dōri 1-chōme, becoming one of the roots of the Kobe Central Catholic Church.

On May 22, 1870, Daniel Crosby Greene of the American Board began holding Protestant services on Lot 18. Greene constructed a church on Lot 48, which was completed in 1872 and named the Union Church. In 1928, the church moved to Fukiai-ku Ikuta-chō 4-chōme, and then to Nada-Ku, Kobe Nagaminedai 2-chōme in 1992

The first Anglican services in the settlement were held in 1873. From 1876 to 1898, the Protestant Union Church also hosted Anglican services. In 1898, All Saints Church completed construction at Shitayamate-dōri 3-chōme, and Anglican services were conducted there from then on. All Saints Church burned down during the Second World War and was never rebuilt.

=== Music ===
A variety of musical activities took place on the street by the sea, in Naigaijin Park, the Kobe Regatta & Athletic Club gymnasium, and in Nishimachi Park. (Note: Nishimachi Park was constructed in 1871, on a site that was formerly a cemetery of Kōbe-mura outside of the foreign settlement area, and loaned to the foreigners. It was also called Foreigner Park (外国人公園, Gaikokujin Kōen). John William Hart, who was involved in the planning of the settlement, denoted it as "PUBLIC GARDEN" on a July 1870 map of his plan. It was renamed Maemachi Park after the return of the settlement, and was closed in 1903.(Doi 2007, pp. 48–49, Yamashita 1998, p. 62)) Most of these activities were concerts, dances, and performances at sporting events. They were held by military bands from the various countries, as well as by private bands and professional or amateur musicians. KRAC held between one and three performances per year, featuring both concerts and theatrical plays, to cover its management expenses.

=== Sports ===
==== Sports organizations ====
===== Hiogo and Osaka Race Club =====
The Hiogo Race Club (HRC), was launched as the Kobe foreign settlement's first sports organization on March 1, 1869, and afterwards expanded in scope to become the Hiogo and Osaka Race Club (HORC). The HORC built a permanent horse-racing course between Ikuta Shrine and the contemporary course of the Ikuta River and periodically hosted races. The HORC was quite active and exchanged horses and riders with the Nippon Race Club, but its financial situation worsened. The club became unable to pay rent on its land and lost the racecourse, dissolving in November 1877.

===== Kobe (Hyogo) Cricket Club =====
The foreign settlement at Kobe quickly became home to many British residents, including many lovers of their country's national sport. The Hyōgo Cricket Club was founded on January 19, 1870, around the main members of a team of foreign residents that had played a game on October 16 of the previous year against a British army team. The club changed its name in 1871 to the Kobe Cricket Club (KCC). For a long time, the KCC was unable to secure enough members or playing ground to undertake any conspicuous activity, but after May 1877, when the future Higashi Yūenchi park was completed, the club became quite active, playing games in the park seemingly every week. Beginning in 1893, the club also played games of baseball. The KCC continued to operate until World War II.

===== Kobe Regatta and Athletic Club =====
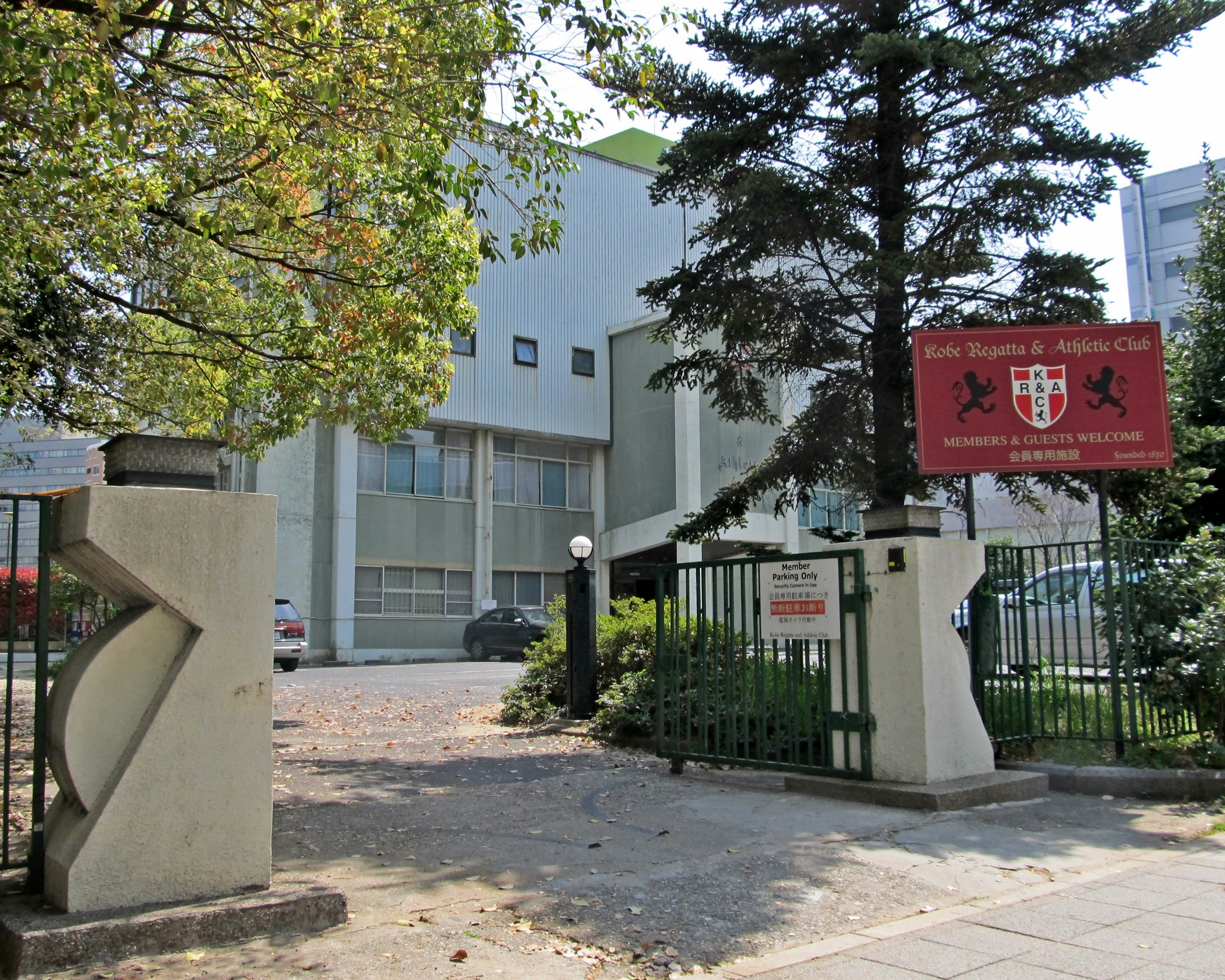
Kobe Regatta & Athletic Club

The Kobe Regatta & Athletic Club (KRAC) was a sports club founded on September 23, 1870, by the proposal of Alexander Cameron Sim. KRAC was able to secure land on the eastern side of the foreign settlement immediately, and by December 1870, just three months after its founding, had completed a boathouse and gymnasium, (Note: After the completion of Higashi Yūenchi Park, the gymnasium was transferred there in 1877. The relocated gymnasium was expanded in 1927, but burned down in 1945 during the bombing of Kobe.) and a pool by June 1871, launching its activities at a favorable pace. KRAC members competed in a wide variety of sports including regatta, track and field, rugby football, tennis, swimming, water polo, and rifle shooting. In 1871, KRAC competed at the Yokohama foreign settlement against the Yokohama Boat Club and the Nippon Rowing Club in a regatta event. After this, the sports clubs of Kobe and Yokohama periodically competed at events including regatta, track and field, cricket, and football. These matches continued even after the return of the settlement, with the exception of a period during the Second World War.

The KRAC gymnasium was open to non-members as well, and was used not only as KRAC's clubhouse but also as a town hall for the foreign settlement. It was also used as a theater, and was nicknamed the Gymnasium Theater (体育館劇場, taiikukan gekiba) or settlement theater (居留地劇場, kyoryūchi gekiba). More than just a simple sports organization, KRAC deepened friendships among the settlement's foreign residents and engaged in social activities in the community as well.

==== Naigaijin Park ====
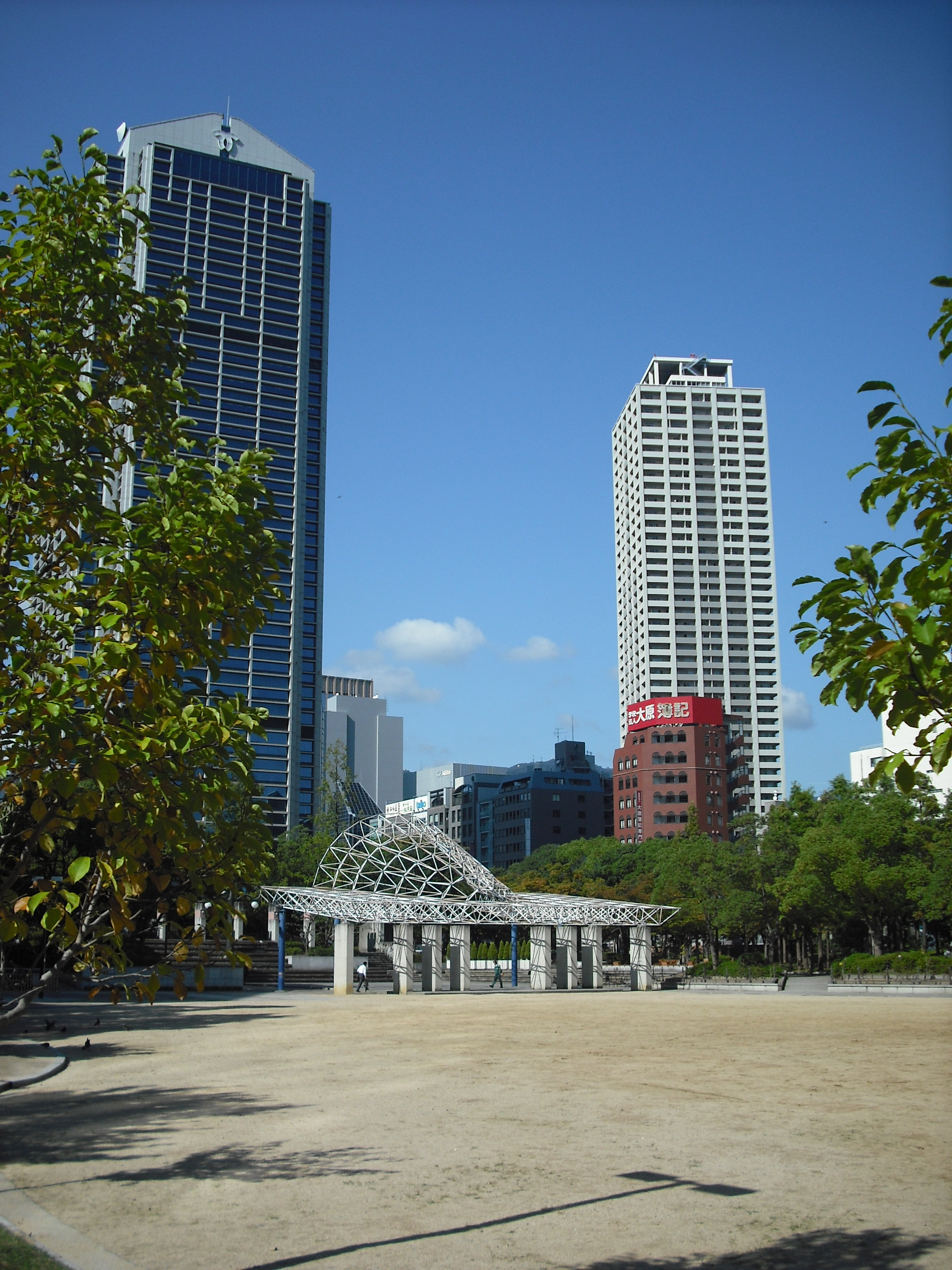
Higashi Yūenchi Park

On Christmas of 1868, shortly after the opening of the port, a horse race was held at the riding ground in the northeastern portion of the settlement, where the town plan had been delayed. This race set a precedent, and cricket and track-and-field events came to be held in the same spot. Even so, this was to the foreign residents only a temporary opportunity until the town plan was completed, and demand rose for an area to be officially allocated for sports. The residents recalled that the Japanese government had promised the establishment of such a sports ground, (Note: John William Hart's July 1870 settlement plan had labeled the eastern bank of the Ikuta River as "RESERVED FOR RECREATION GROUND". The residents referred back to this later as the basis for their claim requesting a sports area.) so when a large plot of land appeared to the east of the settlement during the reconstruction of the Ikuta River between April 29 and July 26, 1871, a rumor spread among them that this was to become the sports ground.

In February 1872, a group of foreign residents staked off a portion of this land to claim it. The Japanese government was displeased, but after negotiations, it approved the establishment of a sports ground in November 1874, in the form of a park to be shared by both the settlement's foreign residents and the local Japanese. The costs of its construction and maintenance became the responsibilities of the foreigners themselves, and in this way they were able to obtain a sports area about ten years after the port's opening. The park was completed in May 1877 and named Native–Foreigner Park (内外人公園, Naigaijin Kōen).

The park's grounds took the form of a lawn. The sight of the foreigners merrily engaged in sports like rugby and tennis likely contributed to the spread of these sports to the surrounding areas. Naigaijin Park was returned to the Japanese government along with the rest of the settlement in 1899, and transferred to the management of the city administration. It was renamed to Kano-chō Yūenchi (加納町遊園地), and in 1922 to Higashi Yūenchi (東遊園地). The park was used for sports games for about 90 years, until 1962, when that function was transferred to the nearby Isogami Park.

=== Foreign newspapers ===
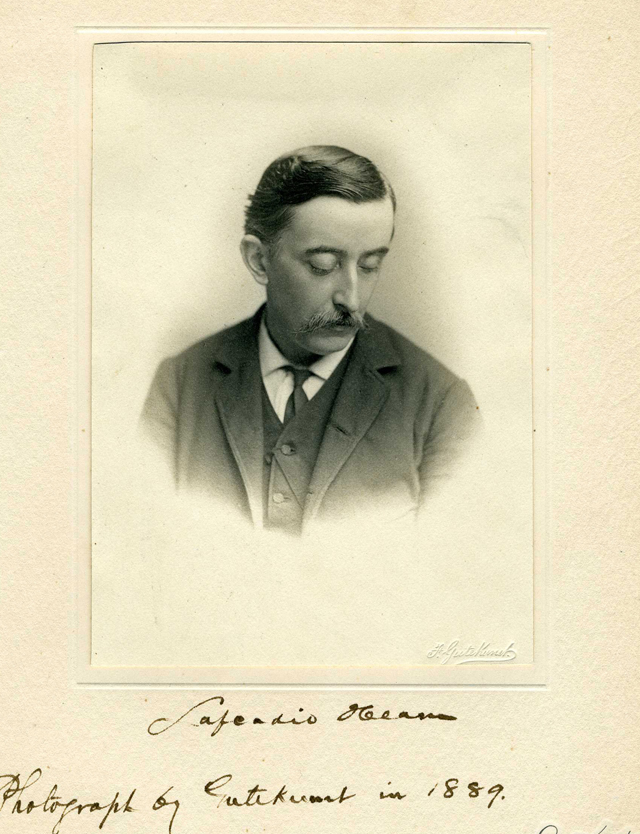
Lafcadio Hearn

The first foreign-language newspaper published in the Kobe foreign settlement was the Hiogo and Osaka Herald, launched by A. T. Watkins, which released its first issue on January 4, 1868. On April 23 of that year the Herald's typesetter Filomena Braga left the paper to start his own paper, the Hiogo News. After a few years the Herald, undercut by the News's lower subscription price, discontinued its publication.

In 1888 A. W. Quinton established the Kobe Herald, and on October 2, 1891, Robert Young started the Kobe Chronicle. The Chronicle occasionally ran editorials by Lafcadio Hearn. After the return of the settlement in 1899, the Kobe Chronicle purchased the Hiogo News (which had been renamed to the Hiogo Evening News), changed its company name to the Japan Chronicle, and expanded beyond Kobe, growing until it recorded the largest number of copies printed of any foreign-language newspaper in the country.

The Kobe Herald changed its name in 1926 to the Kobe Herald and Osaka Gazette, but ceased publication shortly thereafter. The Japan Chronicle ceased publication in January 1942.

=== Social clubs ===
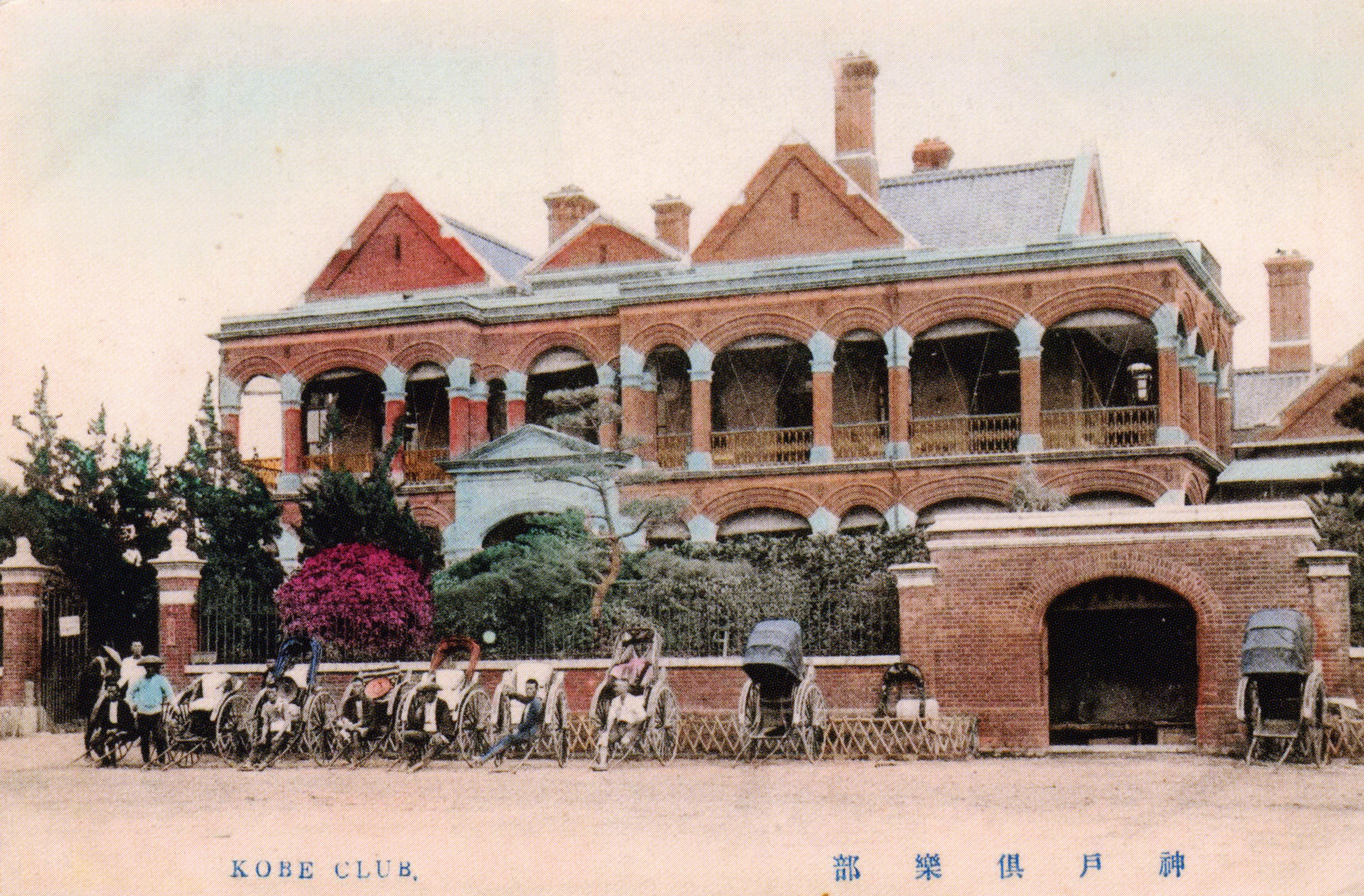
Kobe Club clubhouse (completed in 1890)

There were two social clubs within the Kobe foreign settlement. The first, Club Concordia, was founded by resident Germans in 1868. The club only intended to admit Germans, but to cover the costs of their clubhouse on the eastern end of the settlement they began to accept others as well, including Dutch, Norwegians, and Swedes. The Union Club, also called the International Club and later the Kobe Club, was founded in 1869 by British and Americans, but also accepted others including French and Italians. The club moved its base repeatedly between various buildings within the foreign settlement, from Lot 31 to Lot 32 and then to the basement of the Oriental Hotel in Lot 79. After the establishment of the German Empire, Club Concordia's German and non-German members became antagonistic, and many of the non-German members left. Troubled for funds, Club Concordia sold its facilities to the Union Club, and around 1881 moved into the Union Club's previous space in the basement of the Oriental Hotel on Lot 79. The two clubs were friendly until the outbreak of the First World War, and when the Oriental Hotel burned down in 1890 the Union Club allowed Club Concordia to share their facilities. The Union Club (Kobe Club) continued to be active even after the return of the settlement.

=== Kantei-byō ===
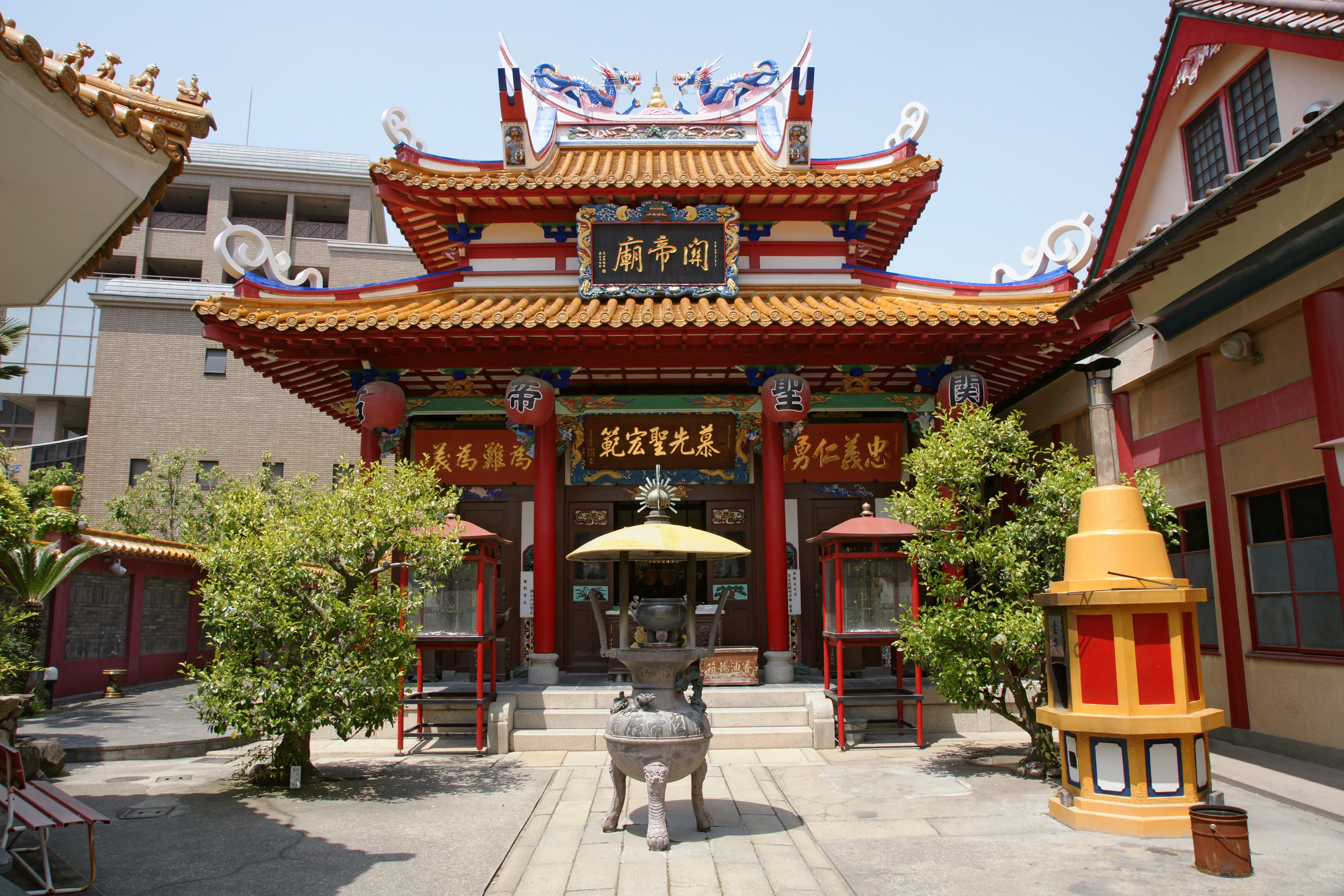
The rebuilt Kantei-byō

To ethnic Chinese, Kantei-byō represented a place to pray for prosperity both in business and in the household, and was a place of spiritual support. Qing Chinese immigrants built two Kantei-byō temples in the mixed residential zone. One was built at Nakayamate-dōri 7-chōme in 1888 by the powerful local Chinese Lán Zhuōfēng, Zhèng Wàngāo, and Mài Shǎopéng, under the auspices of relocating the derelict Jigan-san Chōraku-ji temple from Fuse-mura, Kawachi-gun, Osaka. Chōraku-ji had originally been dedicated to the worship of Eleven-Faced Kannon, but primarily Chinese objects of worship like Guan Di and Tianhou Shengmu were also added along with the move. This Kantei-byō was destroyed in June 1945 by Allied bombs, but was rebuilt in 1947 and equipped with a statue of Guan Di imported from Taiwan. The other Kantei-byō was likewise built in 1888, in Kano-chō 2-chōme, and likewise destroyed in the June 1945 bombing, but unlike the first it was never rebuilt. The Zhonghua Huiguan located in Nakatamate-dōri 6-chōme (Note: Destroyed by bombing in 1945. Rebuilt in 1998 at Shitayamate-dōri 2-chōme.) also enshrined a statue of Guan Di, and was therefore also referred to as Kantei-byō.

The rebuilt Kantei-byō holds an event (suiriku fudo shōe (水陸普度勝会)) during the Ghost Festival from the 14th to the 16th day of the 7th month of the lunar calendar each year. In October 1997, this festival was designated Municipal Intangible Folk Cultural Property No. 1 of Kobe City.

== Medicine ==
The resident foreigners viewed the bad condition of their settlement's sanitation as a serious problem from the start. Typhus infections were common, and it was feared that smallpox or cholera might spread as well. In May 1869, the prefecture established a hospital in Ujino-mura (宇治野村) (Note: Located at the current Chūō-ku Shitayamate-dōri 2-chōme) that accepted foreigners in addition to Japanese patients, called Kobe Hospital (神戸病院). (Note: Later the Kobe University Hospital) But after a little over a year the foreigners, disappointed with the low level of treatment available there, began to feel the need to establish their own self-managed hospital facilities.

The foreign residents investigated the possibility of establishing a hospital accepting both foreigners and Japanese, but the prefectural response was not positive, and in February 1871 the foreigners decided to independently establish their own donation-funded international hospital, the International Hospital of Kobe (神戸万国病院, Kōbe bankoku byōin). (Note: Later the Kobe Kaisei Hospital (神戸海星病院)) John Cutting Berry, who became the International Hospital's medical director in July 1872, adopted a policy of examining Japanese patients as well as those from other countries. The hospital was run at first out of a house near Ikuta Shrine, (Note: Within the mixed residential zone.) but discontent over the inadequate facilities led to the construction in 1874 of a new hospital building in Yamamoto-dōri 1-chōme.

== Foreign residents ==
=== Foreign population ===
The population of foreign residents in both the foreign settlement and mixed residential zone was as follows.

Year	British	American	German	French	Dutch	Qing	Other	Total
1871	116	Unknown	36	19	36	240	Unknown	Unknown
1878	230	52	50	11	26	619	28	1016
1880	194	63	42	10	10	517	22	858
1885	144	37	42	12	11	630	27	903
1890	310	87	87	59	13	1432	51	2039
1895	449	121	177	29	15	988	129	1908

=== Important foreign residents ===
==== Businessmen ====
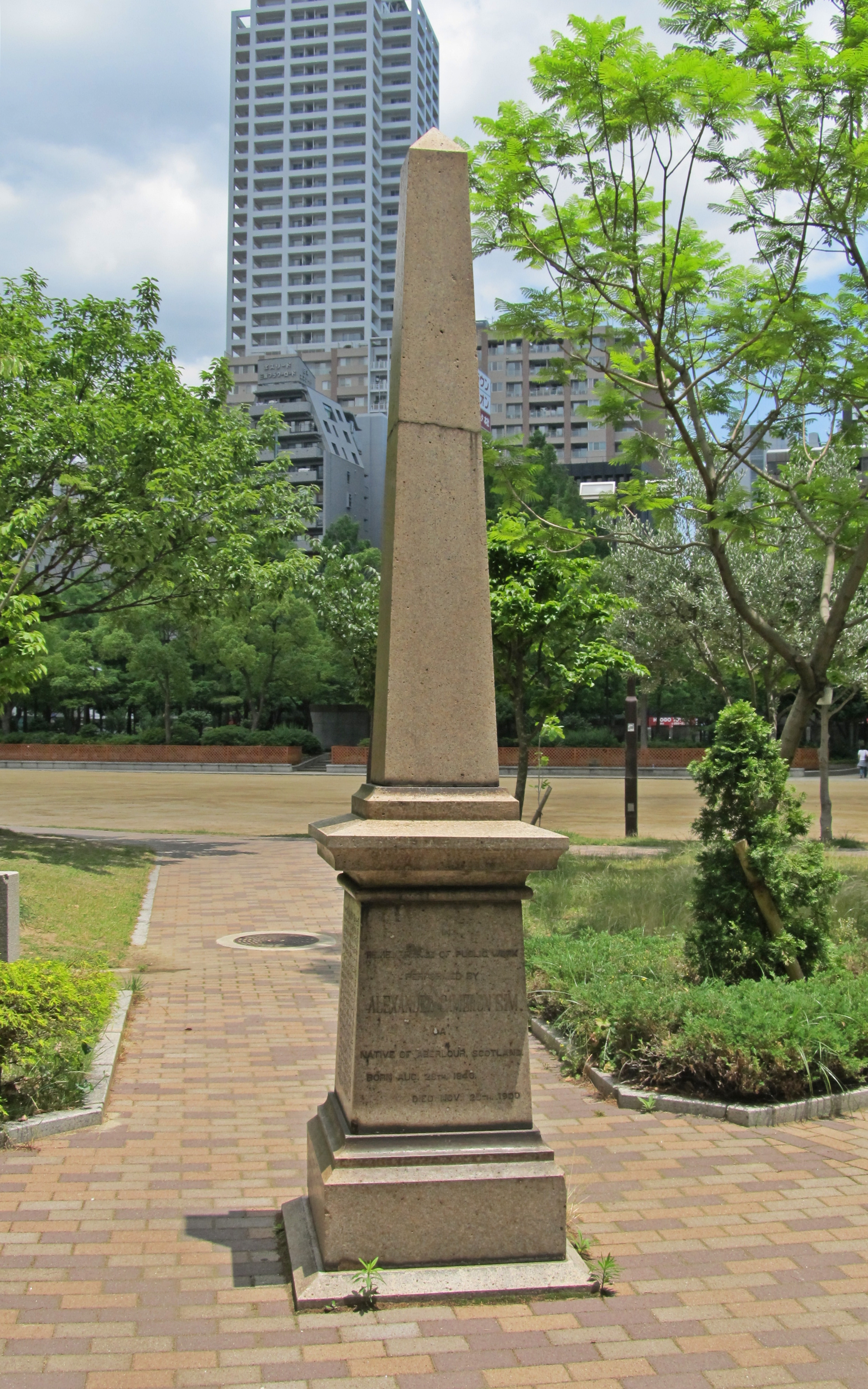
Monument honoring Alexander Cameron Sim in Higashi Yūenchi Park

Alexander Cameron Sim moved to Kobe in 1870, where he worked for the settlement druggist Llewellyn & Co. before establishing Sim & Co. on Lot 18. In addition to distributing Ramune and proposing the foundation of the KRAC, Sim was also known for leading the settlement's internal firefighting force, for which he held lookout from a fire lookout tower in Nishimachi Park near his home. He kept his firefighting clothes, helmet, and axe beside his pillow even when he slept and participated personally in almost every fire-fighting effort during his tenure. After the settlement was returned and the firefighting force incorporated into Kobe's, Sim was left a position as honorary advisor in the new structure and allowed to direct a team. Sim was also the vice chairman of the settlement's Municipal Council, and as the chairman was sick during the ceremony for the return of the settlement, Sim attended in his place and signed the associated documents.

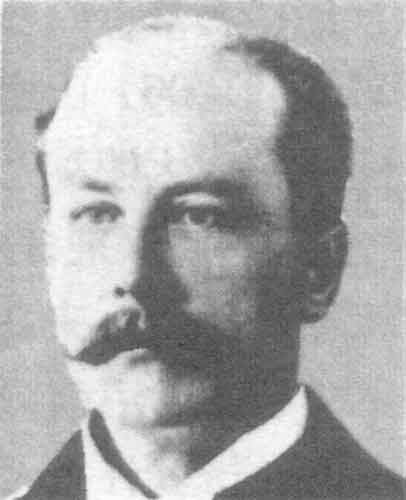
Arthur Hesketh Groom

In 1868 Arthur Hesketh Groom, in the service of Thomas Blake Glover's Glover and Co., came to Kobe to establish a branch office of that company. In 1871, Groom helped establish Mourilyan, Heimann & Co. at Lot 101 of the foreign settlement with his Glover and Co. colleague Heimann, exporting Japanese tea and importing Ceylon tea. In 1895 Groom built a villa on land on the peak of Mount Rokkō borrowed under his son's name. Proceeding to sell off lots on the mountain to other foreigners, he laid the foundation for development on the mountain. Groom was also known as a sportsman, and was involved in the founding of both the Kobe Cricket Club and the Kobe Regatta & Athletic Club. Groom's private four-hole golf course, which he built in 1901 on Mount Rokkō, was the first golf course in Japan. In 1903, after the return of the settlement, this developed into the Kobe Golf Club, with a membership system. Groom also worked as president of the managing company of the Oriental Hotel from 1897 to 1916.

Edward Charles Kirby established Kirby and Co. immediately after the opening of the port, importing machinery as well as various goods and sundries. In 1869, Kirby and two Englishmen established Onohama Iron Works, which Kirby then took control of as Onohama Shipyards. Onohama Shipyards made a large contribution to Kobe's shipbuilding industry. In 1882 it produced Japan's first iron steamboat, the Dai-ichi Taiko Maru (第一太湖丸) (a train ferry over Lake Biwa). However, it fell into management difficulties, and in 1884 Kirby committed suicide.

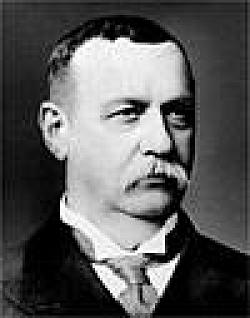
Edward Hazlett Hunter

Edward Hazlett Hunter, a previous employee of Kirby and Co., left that company to establish his own trading business, Hunter and Co., at No. 29 in 1874. In 1879, he gained the cooperation of the lumber dealer Kadota Saburōbee to found Osaka Iron Works (the future Hitachi Zosen Corporation) at the mouth of the Abe River in Osaka and thereby expand into shipbuilding. Hunter succeeded in building a wooden dry dock in 1883, when the project was considered quite difficult with contemporary technology, and successfully transformed Osaka Iron Works into a leading shipbuilder of the Kansai region. Hunter's diversified management put his enterprise on a strong track. When the effects of the Japanese government's deflation measures drove Osaka Iron Works into dire straits in 1882, his company was able to endure the crisis with profits from exporting polished rice. At this time, Hunter exported over 10,000 tons of rice a year, and Kobe rice set the price standard on London's grain market. In his later years, Hunter trusted his business to his son Ryutaro Hunter, who worked hard to deepen cultural exchange between foreigners and Japanese, including by gathering votes for the amendment of the unequal treaties from the foreign residents.

The Walsh Brothers, Thomas and John, moved to Kobe as soon as the port opened and established a branch of their trading business Walsh and Co. (later Walsh, Hall, and Co.). Walsh, Hall, and Co. purchased cotton, which was at the time used in the West to make paper, in Japan and then sold it abroad. They then used quicklime to harden the cotton before exporting it, but the traces of lime in the cotton afterwards would heat up when exposed to water, in a chemical reaction that frequently caused fires. Walsh, Hall, and Co. then switched to exporting the cotton as pulp, which brought in great profits. The Walsh Brothers also established the Kobe Paper Mill (the future Mitsubishi Paper Mills) in Sannomiya, thereby extending their reach into paper production as well.

==== Writers ====
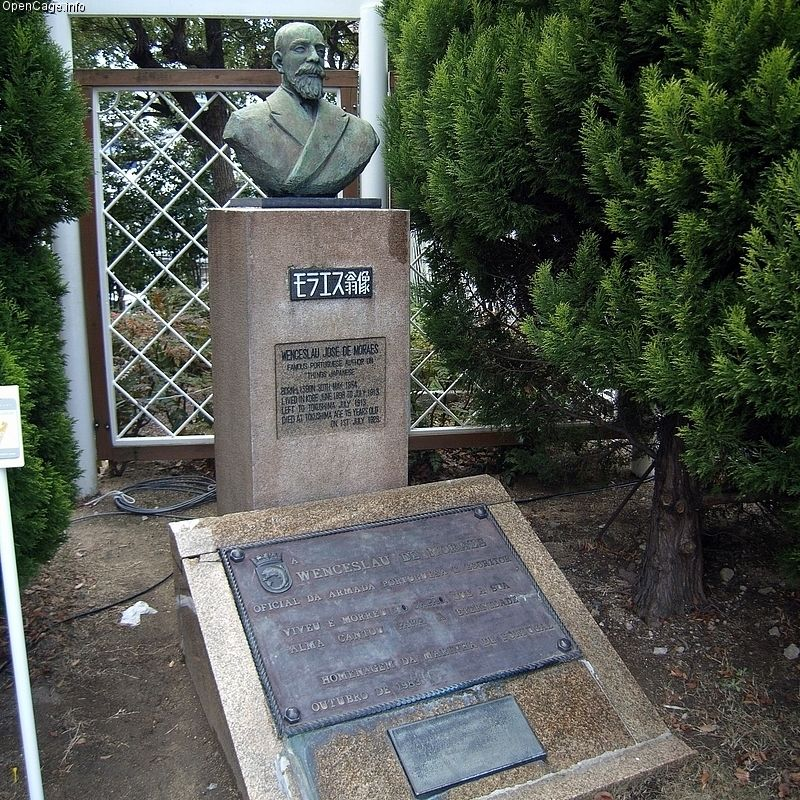
Statue of Moraes in Higashi Yūenchi Park

Lafcadio Hearn stayed in the Kobe foreign settlement from 1894 to 1896. He found employment at the Kobe Chronicle newspaper through an introduction by Basil Hall Chamberlain, and for four months published critical essays in its editorial section. It was in Kobe that Hearn made his decision to become a naturalized Japanese. In 1896, Hearn left Kobe to become a professor at the University of Tokyo.

Wenceslau de Moraes was appointed as the first vice consul of the Portuguese consulate in the settlement, was quickly promoted to consul, and remained in Kobe until 1913. Beginning in 1901, Moraes published essays about Japan in the Portuguese newspaper Comércio do Porto.

==== Christian missionaries ====
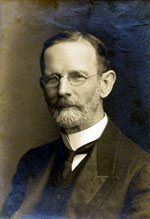
Walter Russell Lambuth

The Christian missionaries who visited the Kobe foreign settlement engaged not only in proselytizing, but also in the fields of education, medicine, and social service.

In the fall of 1886, the Southern Methodist missionaries James William Lambuth and Walter Russell Lambuth opened a school they called the Palmore Institute out of their home at No. 47. There they hosted lectures on English and the Bible. The Palmore Institute developed into a vocational school teaching English conversation, and its women's department became the Keimei Gakuin middle and high school. James Lambuth was further involved in the founding of the Hiroshima Girls' School (forerunner of Hiroshima Jogakuin University) Nursery School Teacher Training Department (one of the forerunners of Seiwa College (Note: Seiwa College merged with Kwansei Gakuin University on April 1, 2009.)), and in 1889 Walter Lambuth established Kwansei Gakuin University. James's wife, Mary Isabella Lambuth, is known for establishing the Kobe Ladies’ School (神戸婦人伝道学校) (one of the forerunners of Seiwa College) in 1888.

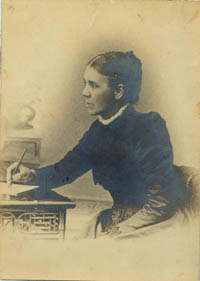
Julia Dudley

Two female missionaries of the American Board, Eliza Talcott and Julia Dudley, called Kobe Home (later Kobe College), at the base of Mt. Suwa in 1875 to improve education for girls. In 1880, Dudley established Kobe Girls' School (神戸女子伝道学校) (one of the forerunners of Seiwa College).

John Cutting Berry, another missionary of the American Board, directed not only the International Hospital of Kobe but also Kobe Hospital, and was energetic in his medical practice in Kobe, Himeji, and Sanda. In January 1873, Berry conducted the first human dissection in the prefecture at Kobe Hospital. He visited Kobe's prison in 1877, on the prefecture's request, in response to an outbreak of beriberi within, and saw with his own eyes the unsanitary conditions and inhumane treatment of prisoners there. He pushed the prefecture to reform its prison system, and many other missionaries followed him in visiting the prisons and presenting plans to the government for their reform.

The nun Philomena Valentine Antonine looked after orphans at the girls' school on Lot 41 beginning around 1890. She continued this work until after the conclusion of the Pacific War, and over the course of her life helped several hundred children.

=== Foreign cemetery ===
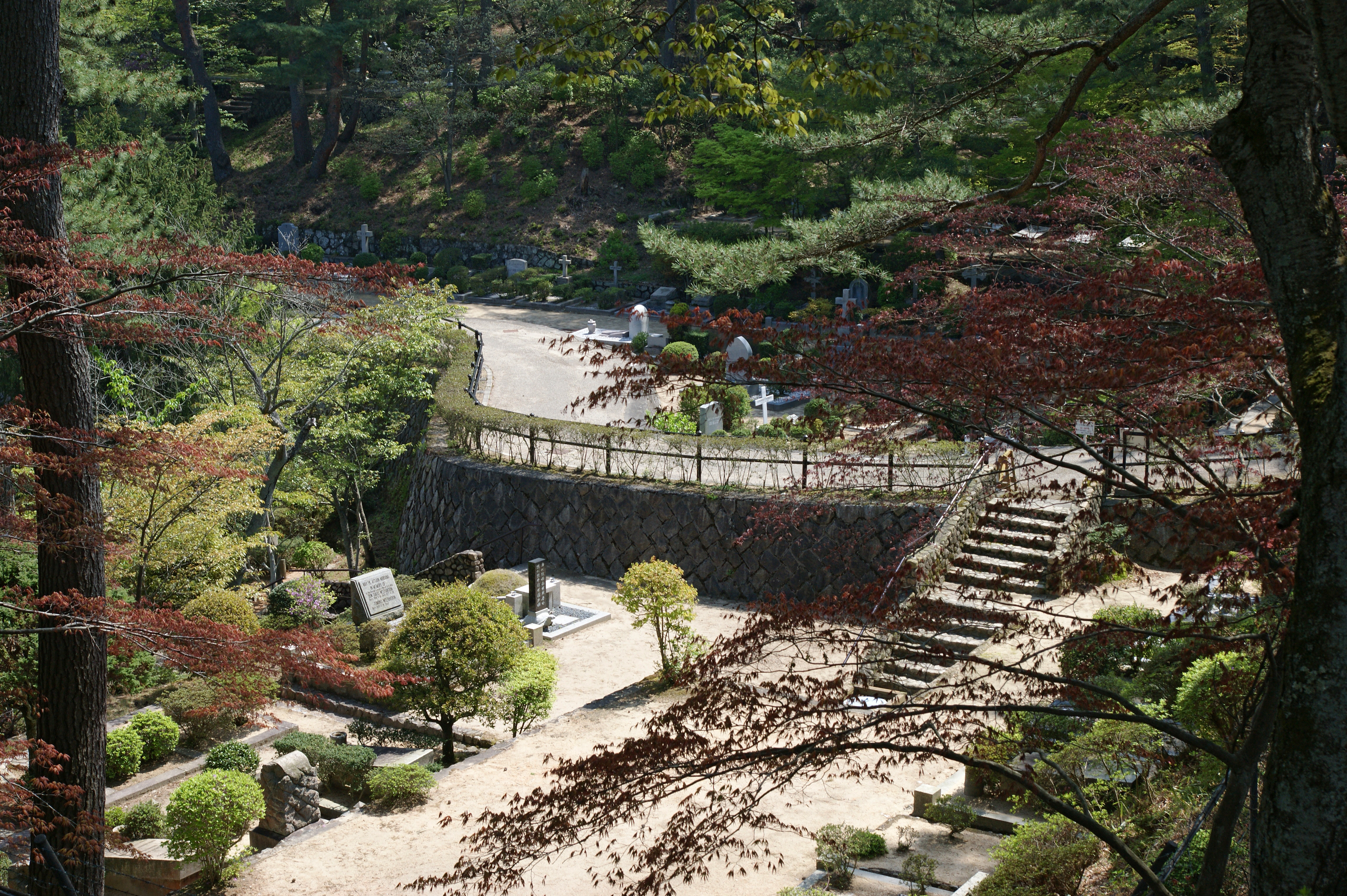
Kobe Municipal Foreign Cemetery

A cemetery for foreign residents was first provided by the Tokugawa shogunate at Onohama Shinden (now Kobe City, Chūo-ku, Hamabe-dōri, 6-chōme) (Note: The Onohama Shinden cemetery was established on the left side of the Ikuta River at its old mouth, in sandy soil beneath the embankment. Because water would seep in if holes were dug deep in the earth there, burials had to be shallow, leaving the graves vulnerable to damage from flooding.) The cemetery was managed by the Executive Committee of the Municipal Council, and by the city of Kobe after the return of the settlement.

In 1899, after the return of the settlement, Kobe City established an additional cemetery at Kasugano, Fukiai-mura (now Nada-ku Kagoike-dōri 4-chōme) because the original had filled up. In time, though, this cemetery became saturated as well, and the city began building yet another at Mt. Futatabi in Chūō-ku. This new graveyard, Kobe Municipal Foreign Cemetery, was completed in 1952 after construction was interrupted during World War II. All the graves at Onohama were moved to the new location in the same year, and in 1961 those at Kasugano were relocated there as well.

== Influence on surrounding area ==
The Kobe foreign settlement prospered as a foothold of trade and gateway to Western culture, imparting economic and cultural effects on its surroundings as well.

Before the port opened, the local center of trade had been Hyōgo Bay, around which a town had formed. After the opening of the port, the area around the foreign settlement became an economic powerhouse, leading to the construction of a new town around it. (Note: Factories run by foreign traders were built in the northeastern area of the settlement, while on the western seashore banks and shops run by Japanese people were established. Residential areas formed around both.) Beginning in 1890, the town around the foreign settlement and that around the old port met and joined into one contiguous town area. The port finally opened at Hyōgo was not in fact the originally active one but rather somewhat removed, on the coast at Kōbe-mura; in 1892 an Imperial edict deemed this the Port of Kobe, and in that same year its area was increased to incorporate the old port of Hyōgo as well.

Some of the earliest effects were felt in the area of food. Japanese-run establishments began serving beef as early as 1869, butcher shops emerged shortly after, and from then on Japanese people made their livings working with beef. The drinking of milk and eating of bread spread around the same time. Beginning in 1873, Hyōgo Prefecture promoted the construction of Western-style architecture in the town area near the settlement, and after the return of the settlement the building of Western-style designs proceeded well. The sight of the resident foreigners enjoying sports like tennis and rugby inspired the locals to take them up as well. The number of local Christians increased. Shibata Takenaka, who was involved with the construction of the settlement, advocated the construction of a red light district for foreigners on the grounds that "the opening of the port will bring warships and merchant boats, and sailors and others will come and go; without brothels available the situation will be out of control." (Note: 「開港によって軍艦や商船が渡来し、水夫その他の軽輩のものが出入りするので遊女屋がなくては不取締である」, "kaikō ni yotte gunkan ya shōsen ga torai shi, suifu sono hoka no keihai no mono ga deiri suru no de yūjoya ga nakute wa futorishimari de aru") The Fukuhara red light district was therefore built in 1868 at the mouth of the Uji River, the outskirts of the mixed residential zone. In 1870, it was moved east of the banks of the Minato River, north of the Saigoku Kaidō highway, and its new location was called Shin-Fukuhara. Fukuhara's brothels embraced the presence of their foreign clients, and some of its buildings mixed Eastern and Western styles.

The presence of the foreign settlement gave Kobe a modern, stylish, and exotic atmosphere, with a rich spirit of venture, and an accepting attitude towards foreigners. Meanwhile, in the mixed residential zone, Japanese lived side by side with foreigners and interacted with them in their ordinary lives, which helped to mold Kobe into a multiethnic and multicultural city. (Note: The literary scholar Yasuko Imajō observes that Kobe, "due to its location on the route of passage for people of foreign countries, possessed a partial foundation for the understanding of other cultures" (「異国の人が移動する際の通り道に位置していたため一端の異文化理解の素地はあったと言える」).)

== Comparison with other foreign settlements ==
In terms of land area, the foreign settlement at Kobe was third in the country, after Nagasaki and Yokohama, with about 1/7 the area of the Yokohama settlement and 1/2 that of the Nagasaki settlement. Strictly speaking, though, Yokohama was an aggregation of two separate settlements, and Nagasaki of eight. Each of the divisions at Yokohama was itself larger than the whole Kobe settlement, but even the largest at Nagasaki was smaller. The area of the mixed residential zone at Kobe was third in the country after Yokohama and Tsukiji.

The settlement at Kobe was larger than the associated mixed residential zone, but at Tsukiji and Hakodate this was not the case. Tsukiji was overshadowed by the nearby Yokohama settlement, where foreign merchants preferred to reside, and its residential area was nearer to the workplaces of some foreign officials and government advisers. At Hakodate, conditions on the land of the settlement itself were so poor that foreigners preferred to reside outside it in the mixed residential zone.

In terms of foreign population, the larger Yokohama settlement had 4,946 residents in 1893, while Nagasaki had 938 around 1868 and 1,711 on its return to Japan in 1899. Tsukiji, the next largest settlement after Kobe by area, and possessed of a larger mixed residential zone, nevertheless had only 72 official residents in September 1871 and 97 in 1877 due to the prevalence of illegal residency outside the allowed area.

Settlement area in tsubo at the end of 1885
Location	Yokohama	Nagasaki	Hakodate	Tsukiji	Kobe	Kawaguchi
Settlement area (Note: Residential area only.)	348197 (Note: Sum of two settlement areas: Kannai and Yamate.)	105787 (Note: Sum of eight settlement areas: Ōura, Kudamatsu (下松), Umegasaki, Dejima, Shinchi, Hirobaba, Higashiyamate, and Minamiyamate.)	1730	26162	49645	7747
Mixed residential zone area	36216	2973	13216	33323	26756	3578

Kobe and Yokohama both developed as windows to the outside world during the Meiji period. However, Kobe generally enjoyed smoother relations between Japanese and foreigners, while relations in Yokohama were much rockier, suffering from tumultuous boycotts of transactions with foreigners over unfair business practices on a near-yearly basis. One reason for this difference may have been the advantage of experience granted by Kobe's late start. Kobe's port opened eight years after Yokohama's, during which period the worst of the foreign merchants were weeded out and each side was able to deepen its understanding of the other.

There was another similarity between the two ports. As discussed, the shogunate ultimately opened the port of Kobe, rather than that of Hyōgo as was suggested by the Ansei Treaties. The port at Yokohama, similarly, was opened at the then-destitute Yokohama-mura rather than the bustling Kanagawa-juku. In Hyōgo's case the change caused little incident, but in the case of Kanagawa the shogunate proceeded with preparations to open the port at Yokohama over the strong objections of the foreign powers. In the end, the foreign powers ratified the opening of Yokohama when the depth of the water there proved it a geographically superior location for a port compared to Kanagawa.

== Gallery ==
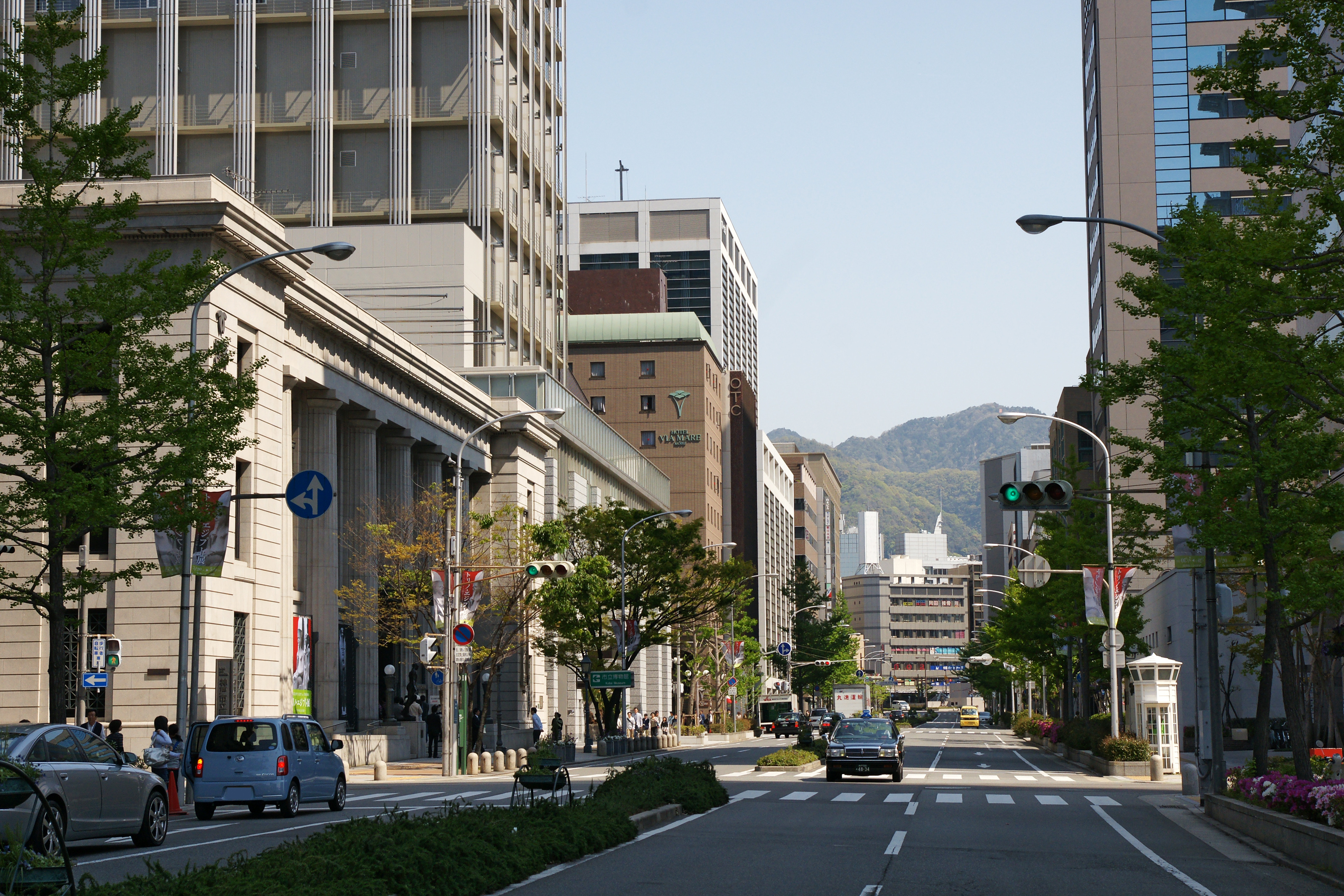
Kyōmachi-dōri, the former main street of the settlement

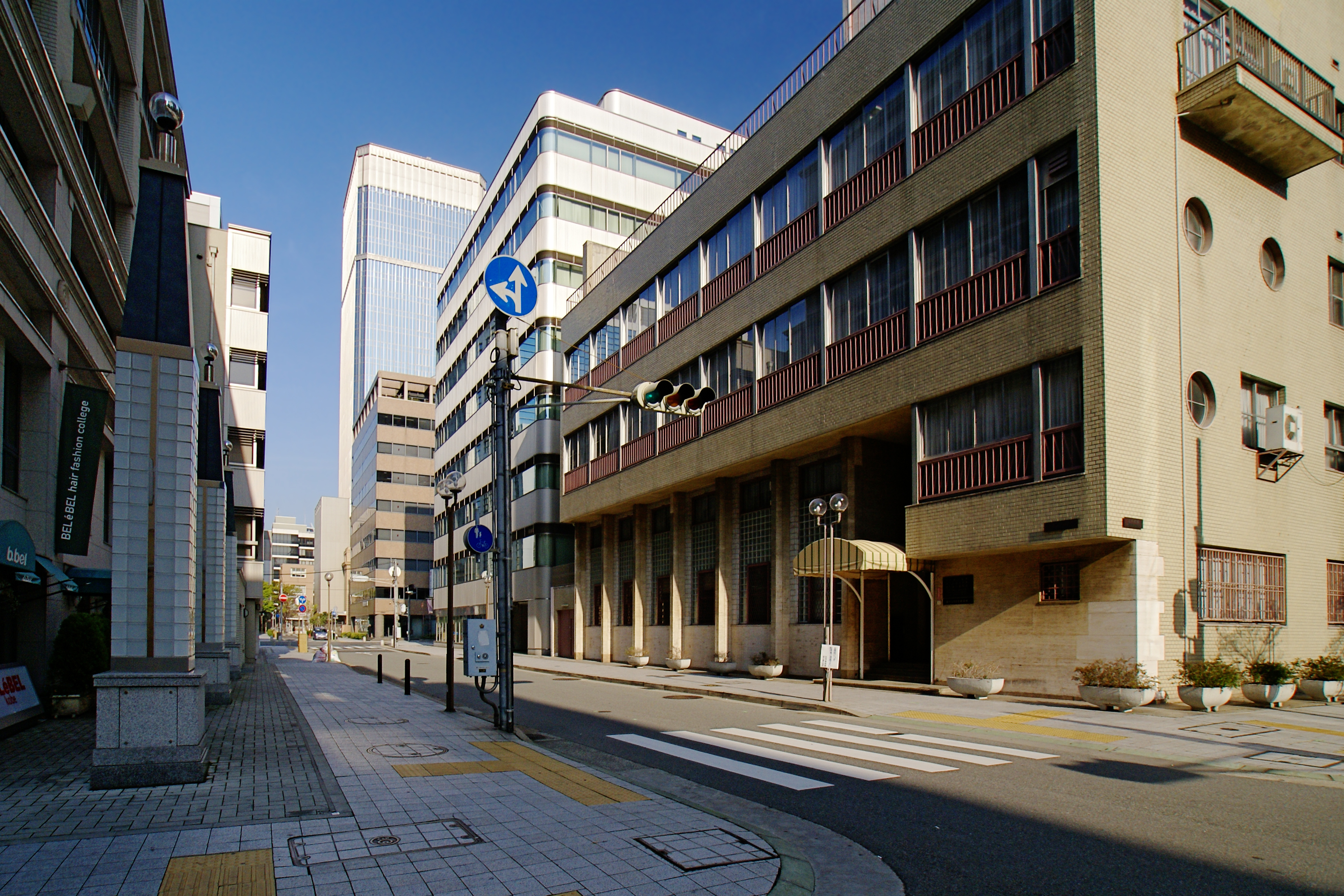
Kitamachi-dōri

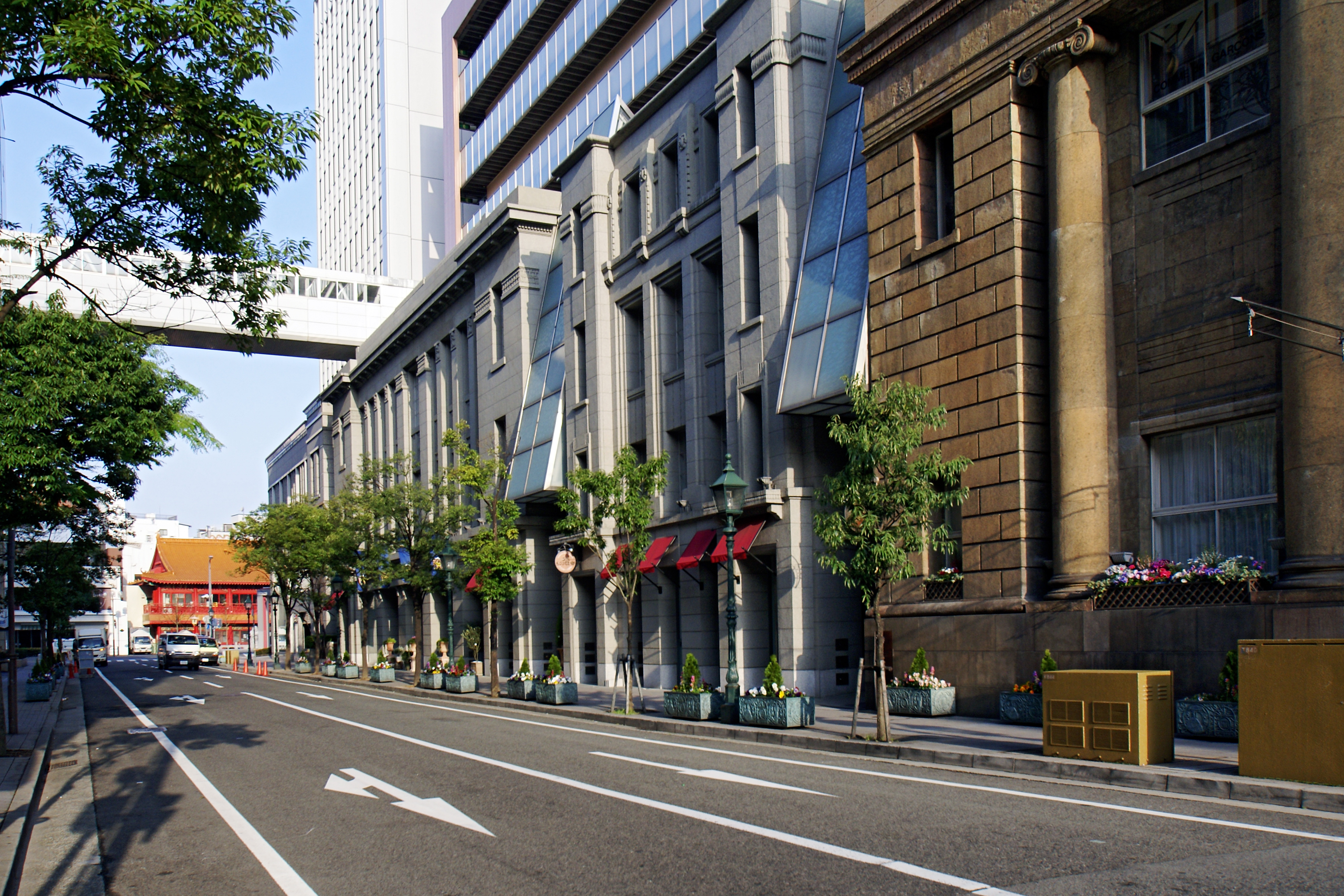
Nakamachi-dōri

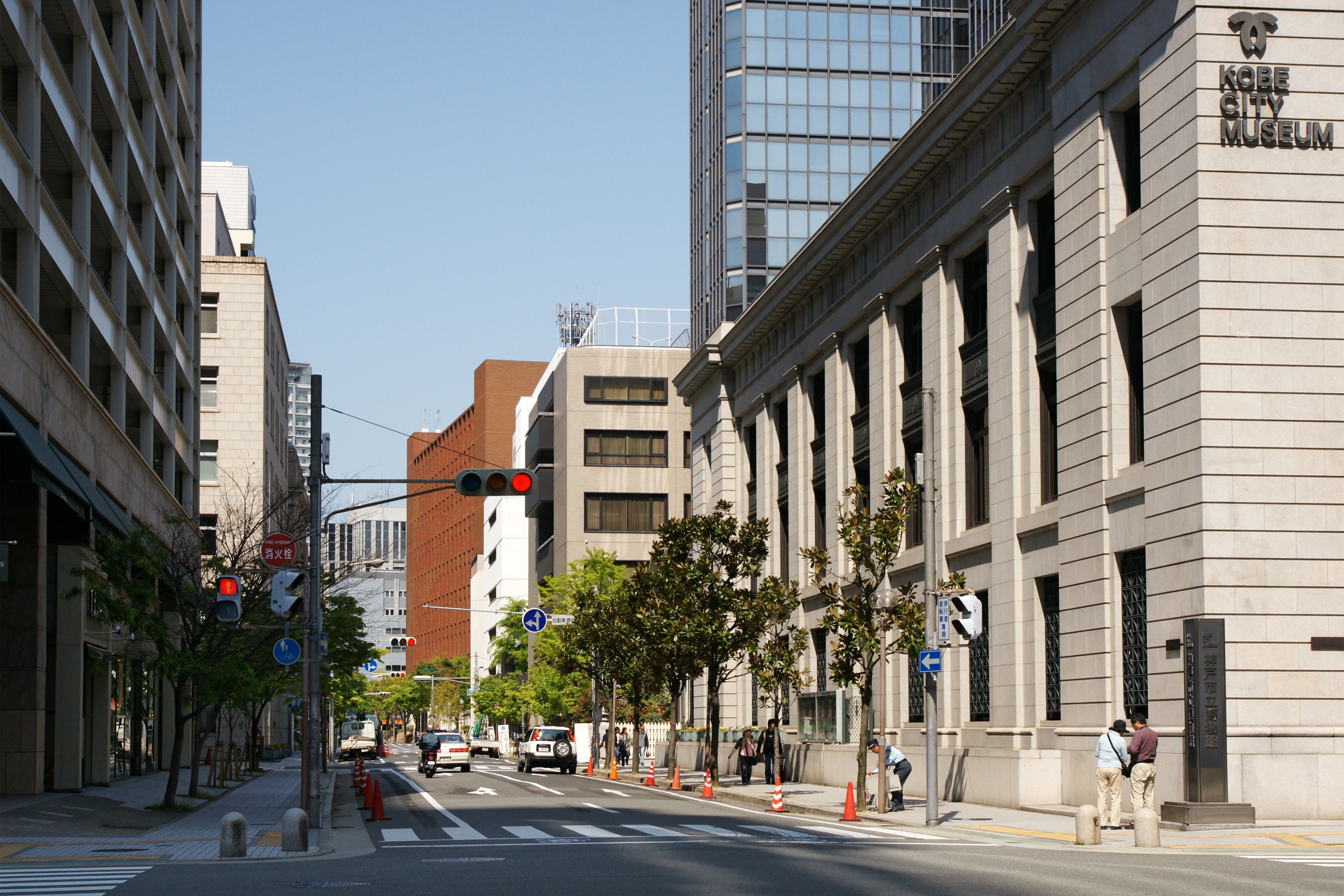
Maemachi-dōri

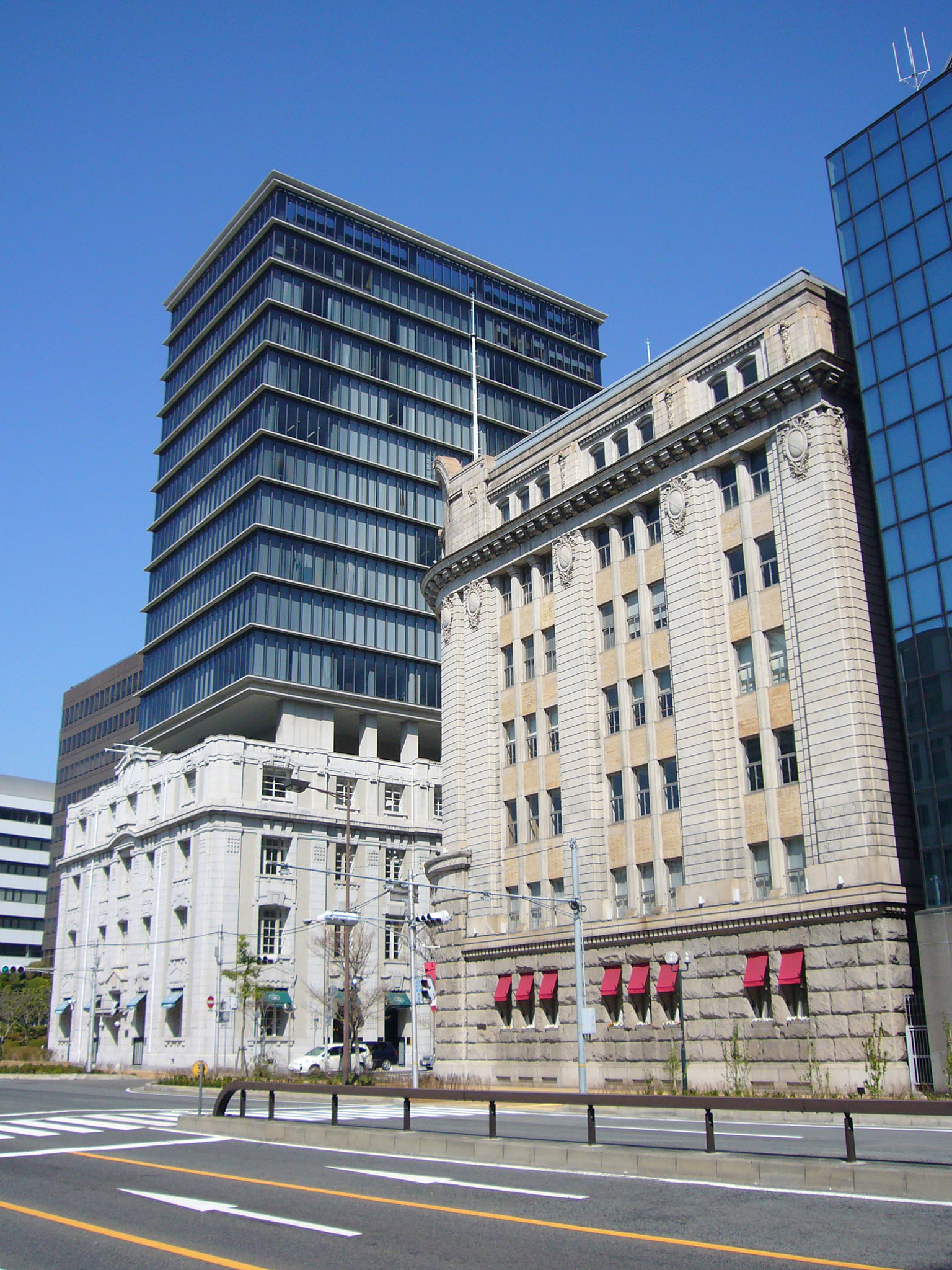
Kaigan-dōri (Japan National Route 2) intersection with Akashimachi-suji

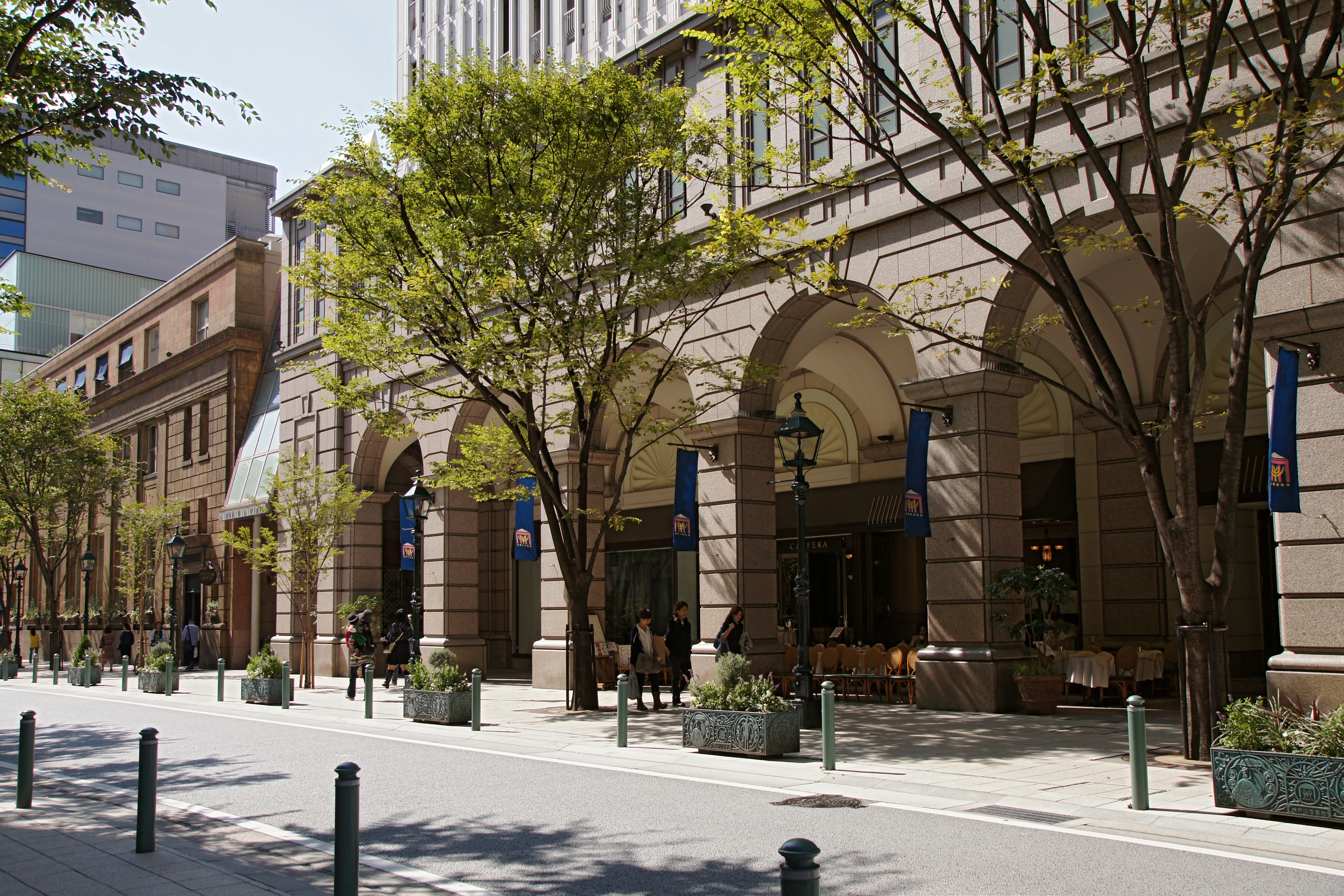
Akashimachi-suji

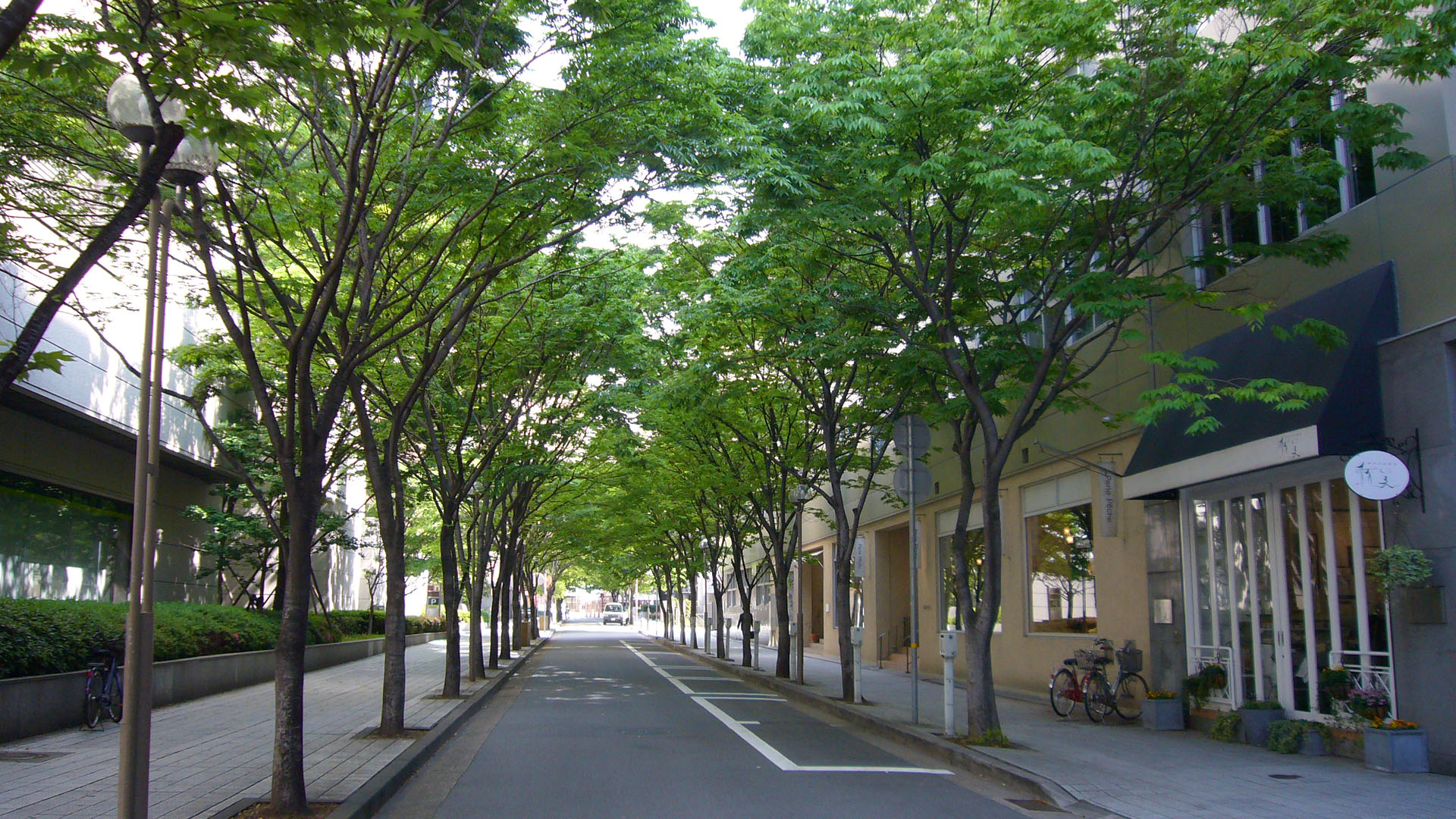
Naniwamachi-suji

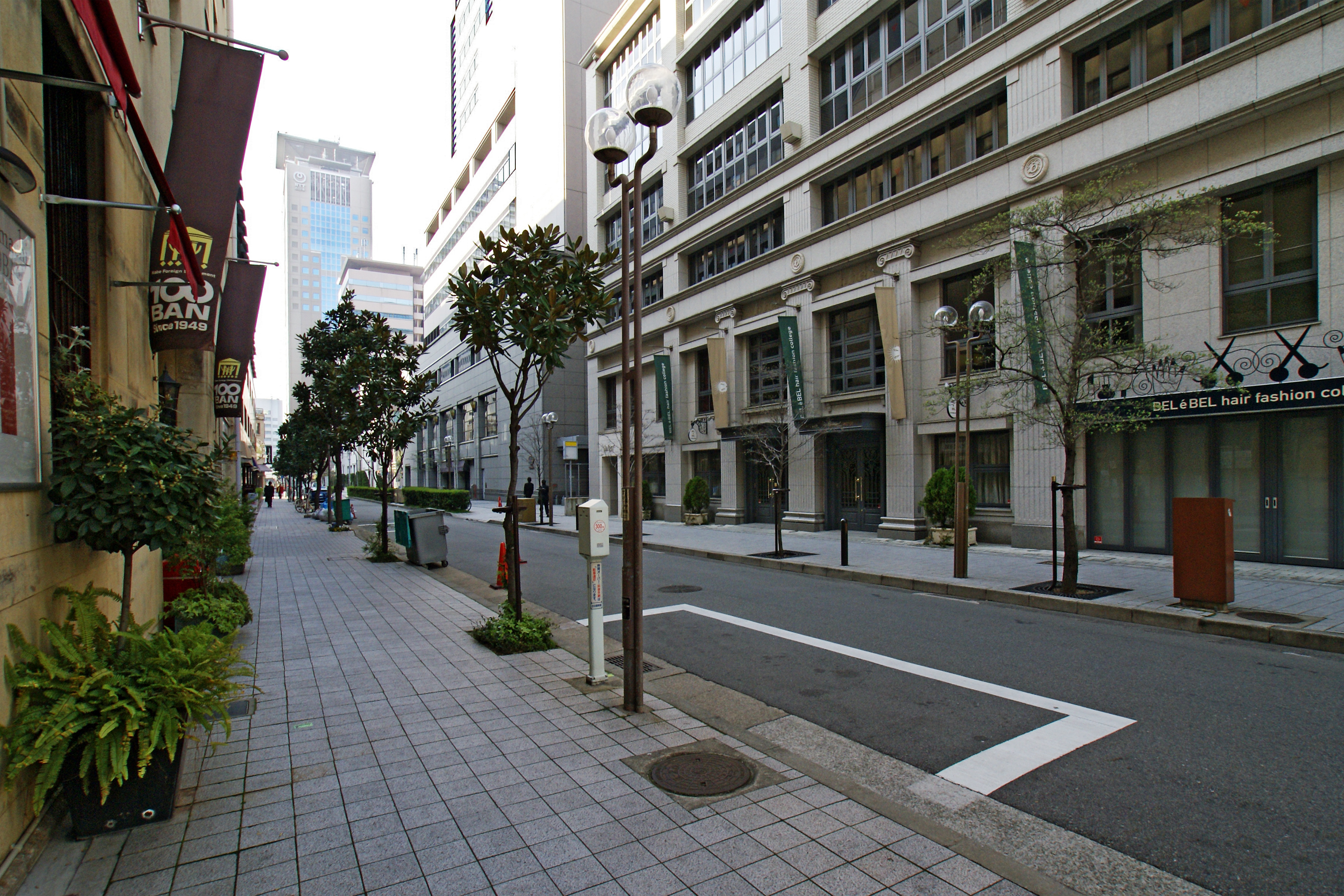
Edomachi-suji

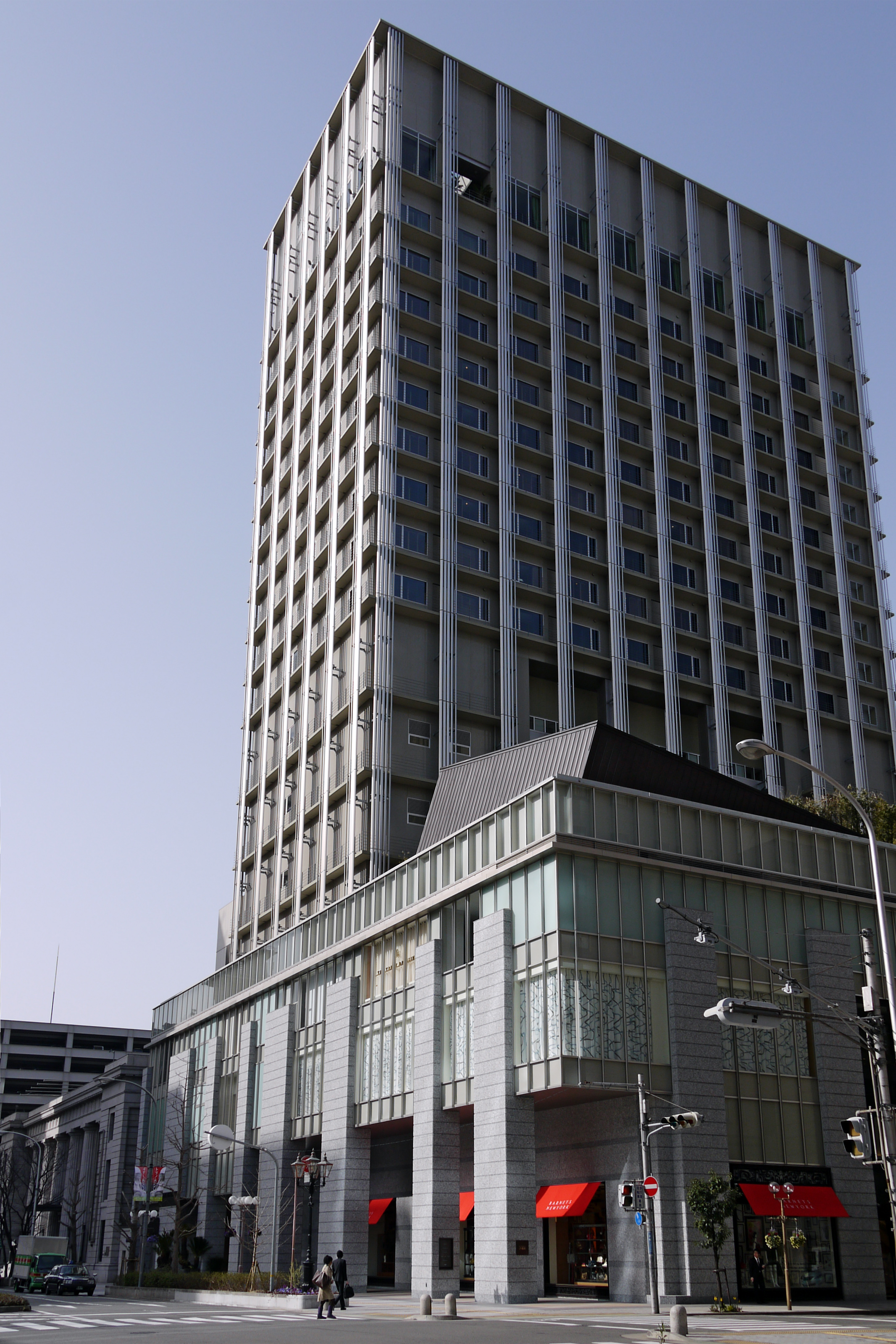
The Oriental Hotel (formerly at No. 25) after its 2010 reopening

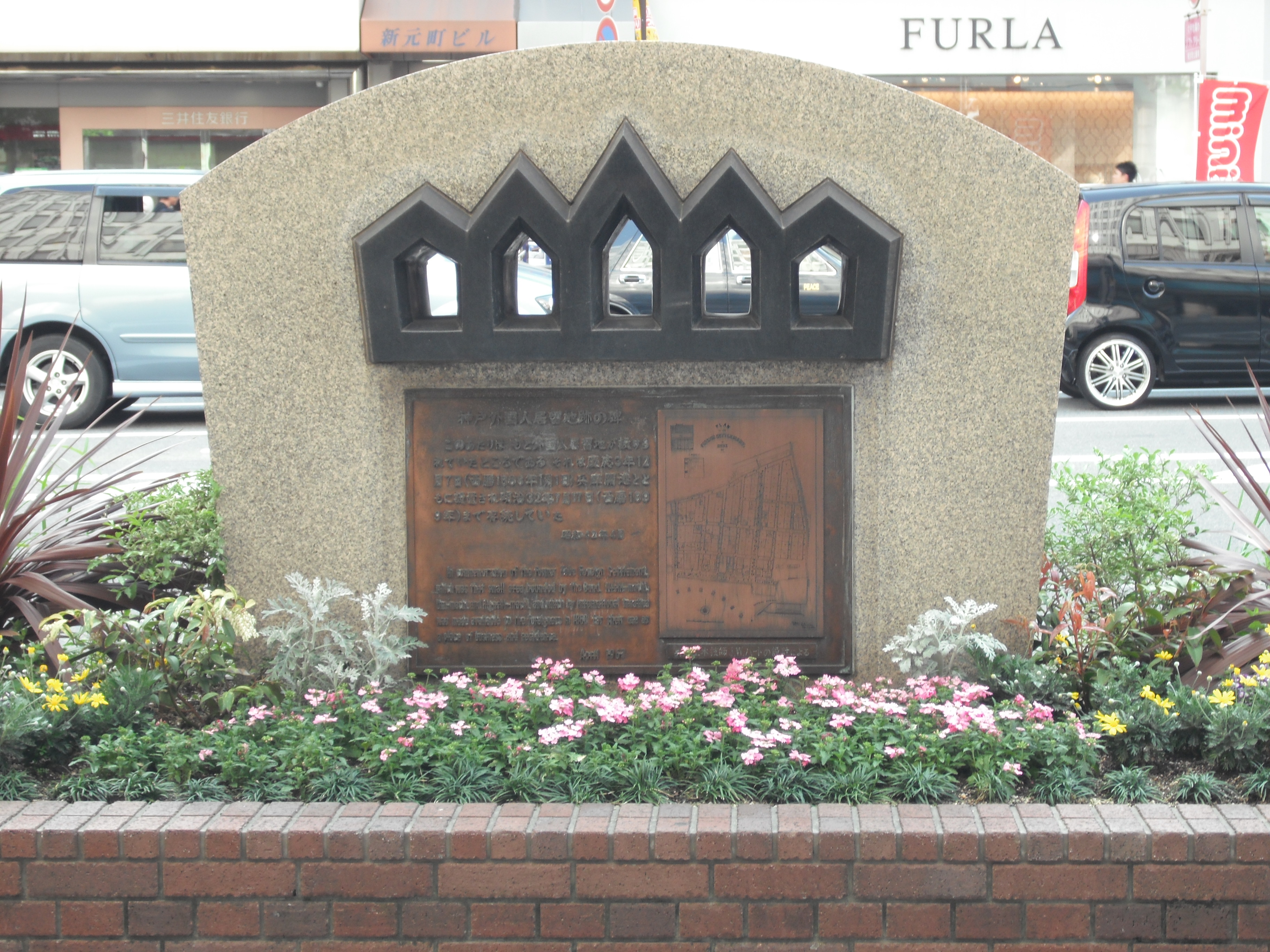
Memorial of the foreign settlement (in front of Kōbe Daimaru)

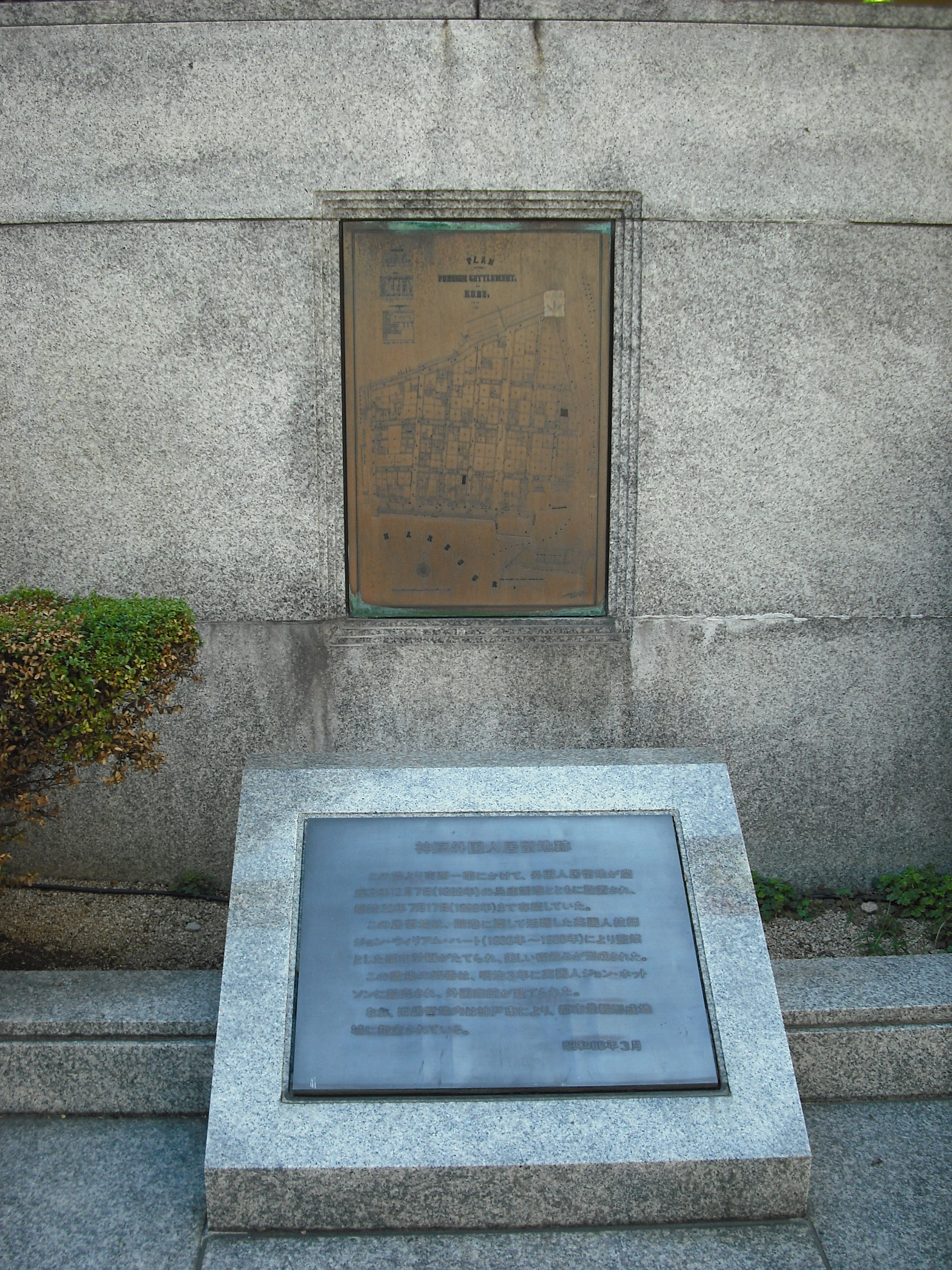
Memorial of the foreign settlement (at former foreign settlement Lot 95)

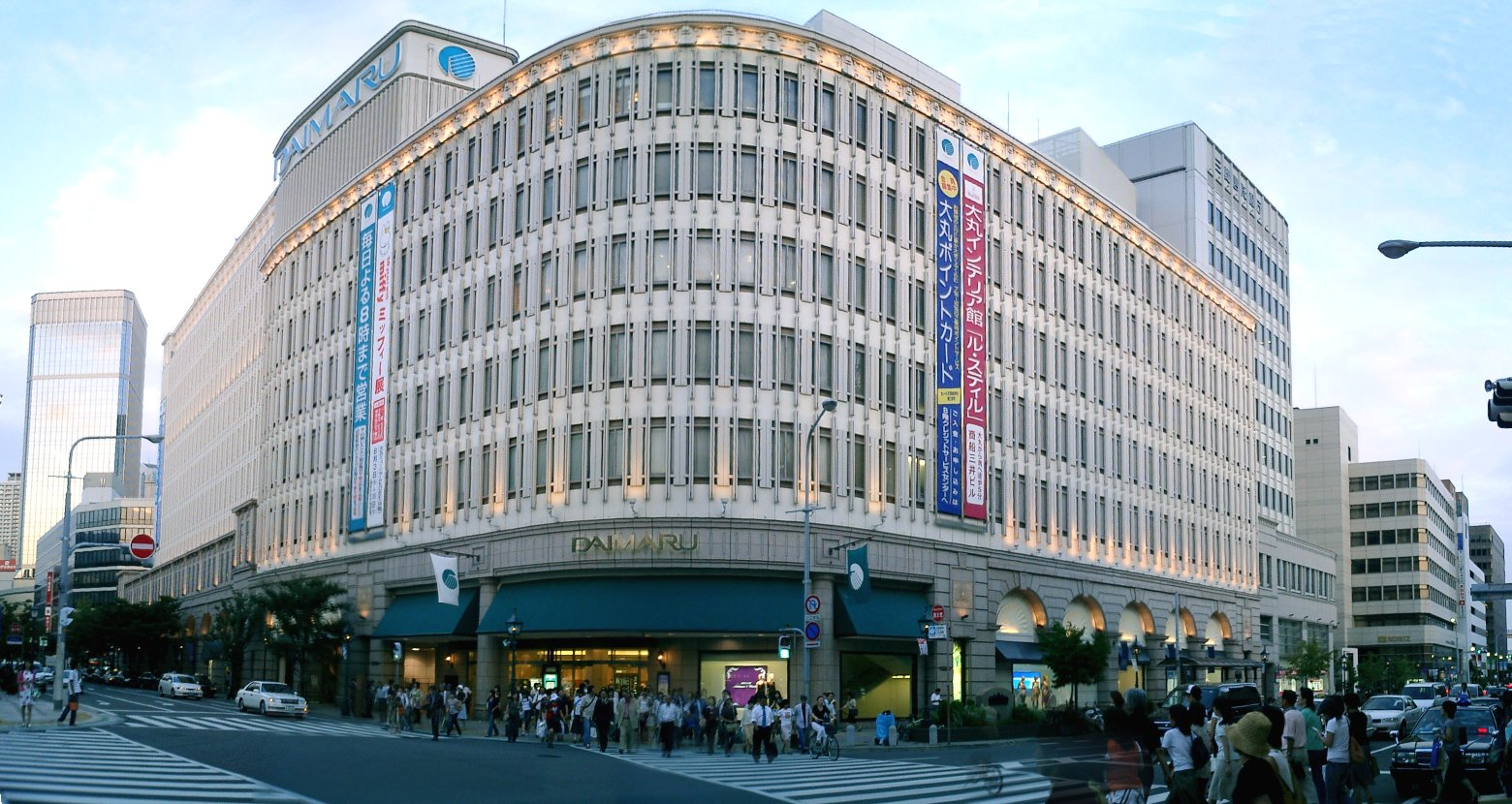
Kobe Diamaru. Located at the northwestern corner of the former foreign settlement area.

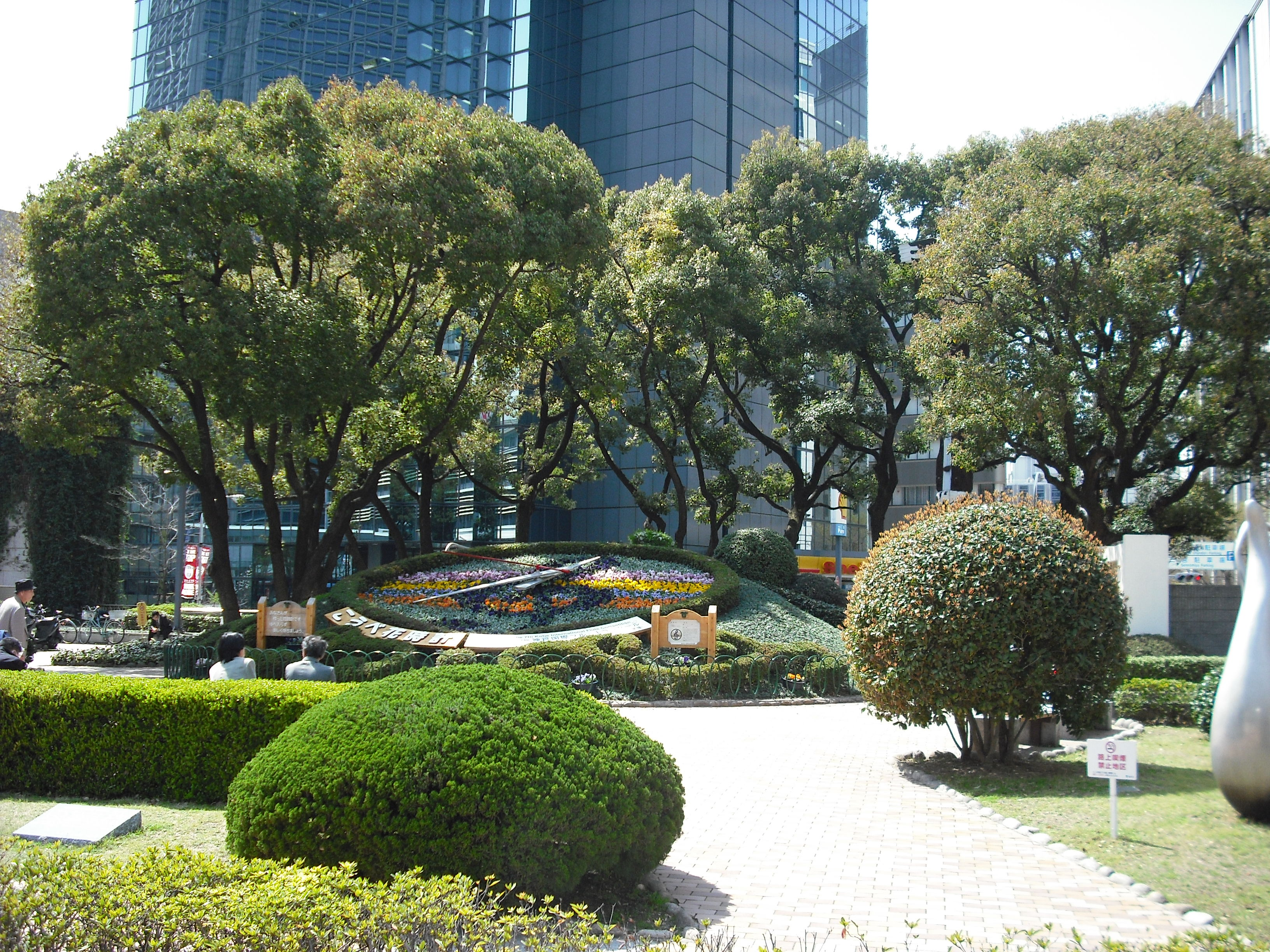
Kobe Flower Clock. Located at the northeastern corner of the former foreign settlement area.

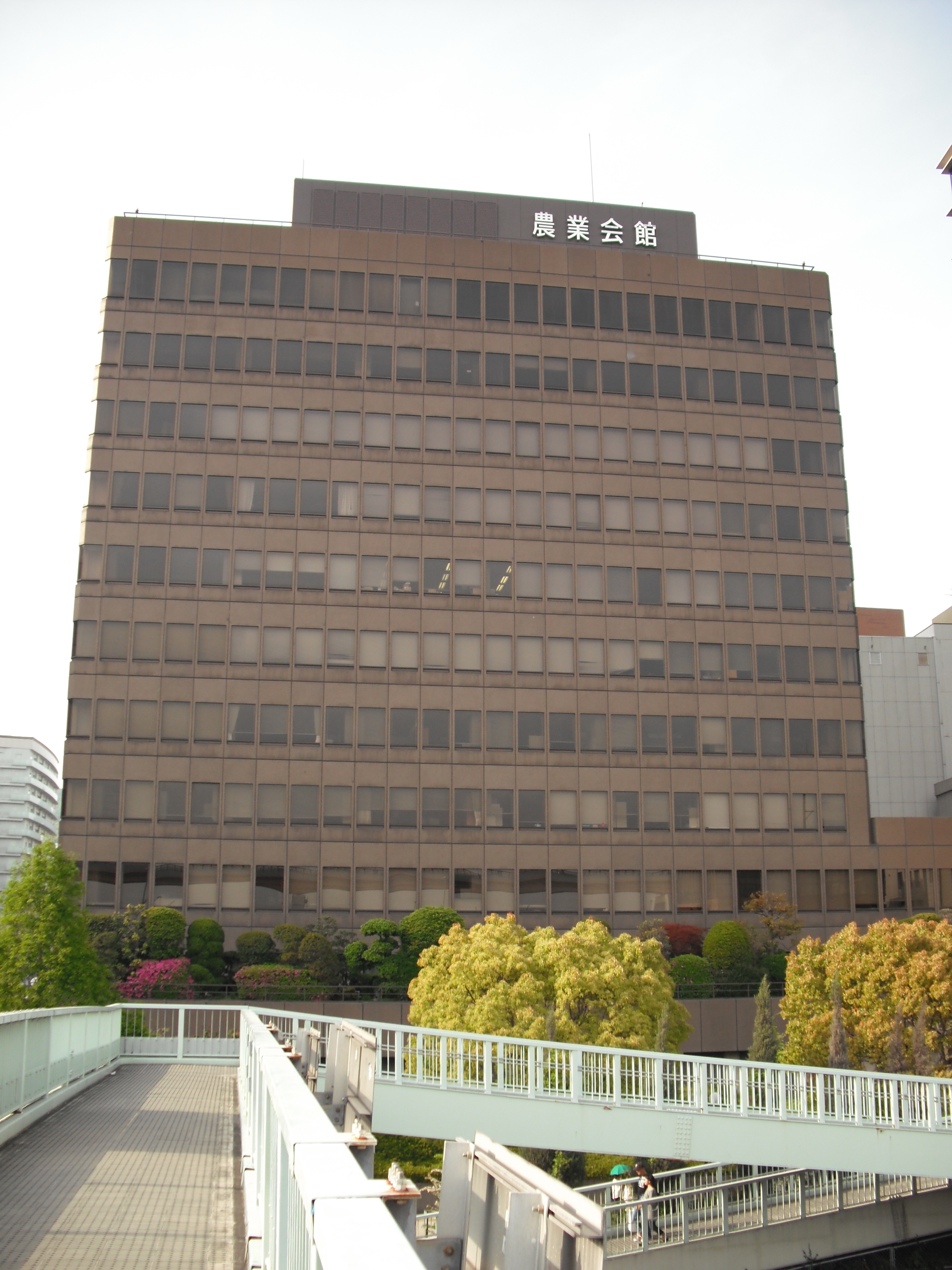
Hyōgo Chamber of Agriculture building. Located at the southwestern corner of the former foreign settlement area.

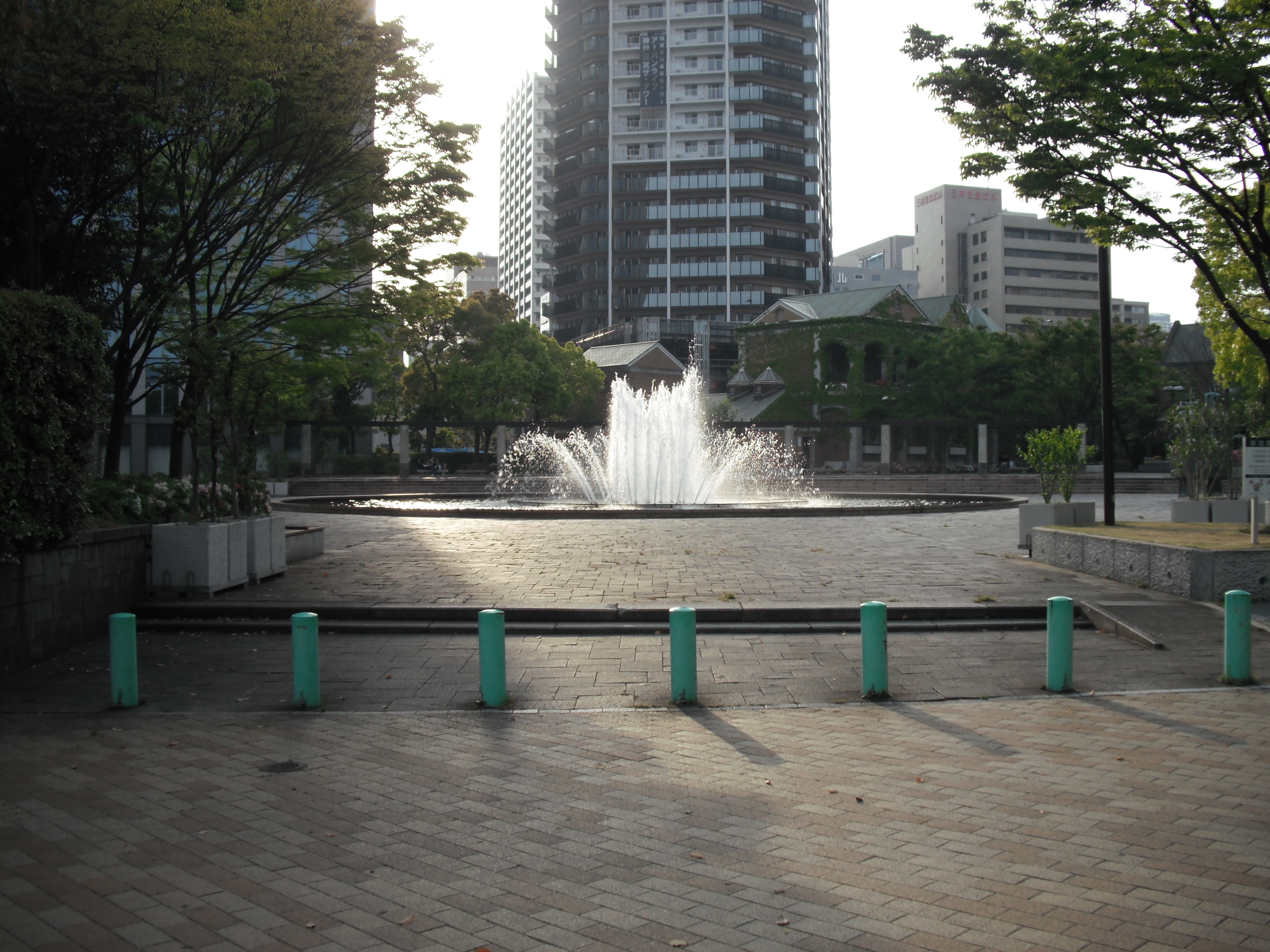
Southern edge of Higashi Yūenchi. Located in the southeastern corner of the former foreign settlement area.

== Bibliography ==
- Katō, Masahiro (2005). Hanamachi: Ikūkan no Toshishi 花街 : 異空間の都市史 [Hanamachi: Urban History in a Different Space]. Asahi Sensho (in Japanese). Asahi Shimbun Publications. ISBN 4-02-259885-9.
- Tetsuo Kamiki (1993). Masahiro Sakiyama (ed.). Kōbe Kyoryūchi no Shibunno Sanseiki: Haikara na Machi no Rūtsu 神戸居留地の3/4世紀 ハイカラな街のルーツ [Three Quarters of a Century in the Kobe Foreign Settlement: Roots of a Stylish Neighborhood] (in Japanese). Kōbe Shinbun Sōgō Shuppan Sentā. ISBN 4-87521-476-6.
- Kawasaki, Harurō (2002). Tsukiji Gaikokujin Kyoryūchi: Meiji Jidai no Tōkyō ni Atta "Gaikoku" 築地外国人居留地 : 明治時代の東京にあった「外国」 [Tsukiji Foreign Settlement: "Foreign" in Tokyo During the Meiji Era] (in Japanese). Yūshōdō Shoten. ISBN 4-8419-0308-9.
- Kusuyama, Iwao (1984). Hyōgo Keisatsu no Tanjō: Bakumatsu kara Meiji no Sesō 兵庫警察の誕生 : 幕末から明治の世相 [Birth of the Hyogo Police: From the End of the Edo Period to the Meiji Era] (in Japanese). Keio Tsūshin. ISBN 4-7664-0304-5.
- Kusumoto, Toshio (2007). (Zōho) Kokusai Toshi Kōbe no Keifu 増補 国際都市神戸の系譜 [(Augmentation) Genealogy of the International City Kobe] (in Japanese). Kōjin no Tomo. ISBN 978-4-87555-514-8.
- Kōyama, Toshio (1979). Kōbe-Ōsaka no Kakyō: Zainichi Kakō Hyakunenshi 神戸大阪の華僑 在日華僑百年史 (in Japanese). Kakyō mondai kenkyūsho.
- Cortazzi, Hugh (1987). Victorians in Japan: In and Around the Treaty Ports. Athlone Press. ISBN 0-485-11312-0.
- Shigefuji, Takeo (1968). Nagasaki Kyoryūchi: Hitotsu no Nihon Kindaishi 長崎居留地 一つの日本近代史. Kōdansha Gendai Shinsho 143 (in Japanese). Kodansha. ISBN 4-06-115543-1.
- Takagi, Masamitsu (1996). This is the MAN: Haikara Kōbe o Tsukutta Otoko A. C. Sim no Shimin Seikatsu, Supōtsu, Borantia Katsudō This is the MAN ハイカラ神戸を創った男A・C・シムの市民生活、スポーツ、ボランティア活動 (in Japanese). Hyōgo Prefecture Rugby Union, Hyōgo Prefecture High School Athletic Federation Rugby Club. ISBN 4-343-00362-0.
- Takagi, Masamitsu (2006). Kōbe Supōtsu Hajime Monogatari 神戸スポーツはじめ物語 (in Japanese). Kōbe Shinbun Sōgō Shuppan Sentā. ISBN 4-343-00362-0.
- Takenaka, Masao (2000). Yukute Haruka ni: Kōbe Joshi Shingakkō Monogatari ゆくてはるかに 神戸女子神学校物語 (in Japanese). Kyobunkwan. ISBN 4-7642-6549-4.
- Tanaka, Tomoko (2012). 近代日本高等教育体制の黎明 交錯する地域と国とキリスト教界 [The Dawn of Modern Japan's Higher Education System: Blending Regions, Countries, and Christianity] (in Japanese). Shibunkaku Shuppan. ISBN 978-4-7842-1618-5.
- Tanada, Shinsuke; Omote, Takehiro; Kanki, Ken'ichi (1984). Pureirando Rokkōsan Shi プレイランド六甲山史 (in Japanese). Shuppan Kagaku Sōgō Kenkyūsho. ISBN 4-87969-005-8.
- Taniguchi, Toshikazu (1986). Shitotachi yo Nemure: Kōbe Gaikokujin Bochi Monogatari 使徒たちよ眠れ 神戸外国人墓地物語 (in Japanese). Kōbe Shinbun Shuppan Sentā. ISBN 4-87521-447-2.
- Doi, Haruo (2007). Kōbe Kyoryūchi Shiwa 神戸居留地史話 (in Japanese). Livre. ISBN 978-4-947727-92-3.
- Torii, Yukio (1982). Kōbe-kō 1500 Nen: Koko ni Miru Nihon no Minato no Genryū 神戸港1500年 ここに見る日本の港の源流 (in Japanese). Kaibundō. ISBN 4-303-63652-5.
- Maejima, Masamitsu; Hasuike, Yoshiharu; Nakayama, Shōtarō (1989). Hyōgo-ken no Hyakunen 兵庫県の百年 (in Japanese). Yamakawa Shuppansha. ISBN 4-634-27280-6.
- Murakami, Kazuko (1987). Yōgashi Tengoku Kobe 洋菓子天国Kobe (in Japanese). Hoikusha. ISBN 4-586-50745-4.
- Yamashita, Takashi (1998). Kōbe-kō to Kōbe Gaikokujin Kyoryūchi 神戸港と神戸外人居留地 (in Japanese). Kindai Bungeisha. ISBN 4-7733-6218-9.
- Kōbe Gaikokujin Kyoryūchi Kenkyūkai, ed. (1999). 居留地の窓から [From the Windows of the Foreign Settlement] (in Japanese). JUNKUDO Co.
- Kōbe Gaikokujin Kyoryūchi Kenkyūkai, ed. (2005). 神戸と居留地 多文化共生都市の原像 [Kobe and its Foreign Settlement: Origins of a Multicultural City] (in Japanese). Kōbe Shinbun Sōgō Shuppan Sentā. ISBN 4-343-00315-9.
- Kōbe Gaikokujin Kyoryūchi Kenkyūkai, ed. (2011). Kyoryōchi no Machi kara: Kindai Kōbe no Rekishi Tankyū 居留地の街から 近代神戸の歴史探究 (in Japanese). Kōbe Shinbun Sōgō Shuppan Sentā. ISBN 978-4-343-00656-1.
- Kōbe Kakyō Kajin Kenkyūkai, ed. (2004). Kōbe to Kakyō: Kono 150 Nen no Ayumi 神戸と華僑 この150年の歩み (in Japanese). Kōbe Shinbun Sōgō Shuppan Sentā. ISBN 4-343-00268-3.
- "Kōbe to Seisho" Henshū Iinkai, ed. (2001). 神戸と聖書 神戸・阪神間の450年の歩み [Kobe and the Bible: 450 Years of Progress in Kobe and its Surroundings] (in Japanese). Kōbe Shinbun Sōgō Shuppan Sentā. ISBN 4-343-00137-7.
- Komei Go, ed. (2006). Kōbe Ikoku Bunka Monoshiri Jiten こうべ異国文化ものしり事典 [Kobe Foreign Culture Encyclopedia] (in Japanese). Kōbe Shinbun Sōgō Shuppan Sentā. ISBN 4-343-00385-X.
- The Japan Chronicle, ed. (1980). 神戸外国人居留地 [The Kobe Foreign Settlement]. Translated by Shirō Odeishi and Hiroshi Hori, commentary by Haruo Doi. Kōbe Shinbun Shuppan Sentā.
- Shinshū Kōbe Shishi Henshū Iinkai, ed. (1989). Shinshū Kōbe Shishi: Rekishi-hen 3 新修神戸市史 歴史編3 (in Japanese). Kobe City.
- Shinshū Kōbe Shishi Henshū Iinkai, ed. (1989). Shinshū Kōbe Shishi: Rekishi-hen 4 新修神戸市史 歴史編4 (in Japanese). Kobe City.
- Shinshū Kōbe Shishi Henshū Iinkai, ed. (2005). Shinshū Kōbe Shishi: Gyōsei-hen 3 新修神戸市史 行政編3 (in Japanese). Kobe City.
- Chūka Kaikan, ed. (2000). Rakuchi Seikon: Kōbe Kakyō to Shinhan Chūka Kaikan no Hyakunen 落地生根 神戸華僑と神阪中華会館の百年 (in Japanese). Kenbun Shuppan. ISBN 4-87636-180-0.
- Nihon Sangyō Gijutsushi Gakkai, ed. (2007). Nihon Sangyō Gijutsushi Jiten 日本産業技術史事典 [Historical Encyclopedia of Japanese Industrial Technology] (in Japanese). Shibunkaku Shuppan. ISBN 978-4-7842-1345-0.
- Yokohama Kaikō Shiryōkan, Yokohama Kaikō Shiryō Fukyū Kyōkai, ed. (1998). Zusetsu Yokohama Gaikokujin Kyoryūchi 図説横浜外国人居留地 (in Japanese). Yurindo. ISBN 4-89660-143-2.
- Imajō, Yasuko (March 2008). 神戸外国人居留地に関する一考察 -異文化の出会う一場所として- [On the Old Foreign Settlement of Kobe: As A Meeting Place of Different Cultures]. Kobe University of Fashion and Design Kobe College of Liberal Arts Researches (in Japanese) (32): 15–28.
- Soeda, Hitoshi (March 2010). 神戸外国人居留地と福原遊女・新撰組 [Fukuhara Courtesans and Shinsen-Gumi in Kobe's Foreign Concession and Mixed Residential Area] (PDF). Journal of Port Cities Studies (in Japanese) (5): 75–87. Archived from the original (PDF) on December 22, 2015.
- Tachikawa, Kenji (September 1996). 神戸居留地における競馬（一） [Horse Racing in the Kobe Foreign Settlement (1)]. Journal of the Faculty of Humanities, University of Toyama (in Japanese) (25): 123–145.
- Tachikawa, Kenji (March 1997). 神戸居留地における競馬（二） [Horse Racing in the Kobe Foreign Settlement (2)]. Journal of the Faculty of Humanities, University of Toyama (in Japanese) (26): 141–213.
- Tanioka, Fumie; Sasaki, Tomoko (September 2001). "Kōbe Kyoryūchi ni Okeru Ongaku" 神戸居留地における音楽 [Music in the Foreign Settlement of Kobe] (PDF). Kobe University Faculty of Human Development Research Bulletin (in Japanese). 9 (1): 211–226. Archived from the original (PDF) on March 4, 2016.
- Zhang, Yuling (March 2005). "Nihon Kakyō ni Yoru Bunka Teiji to Esunikku Aidentiti no Shuchō -Kōbe Kakyō Rekishi Hakubutsukan no Kōsatsu o Chūshin ni-" 日本華僑による文化提示とエスニック・アイデンティティの主張 -神戸華僑歴史博物館の考察を中心に- [The Display of Ethnic Identity through a Cultural Presentation: The Case of Kobe Overseas Chinese History Museum] (PDF). Forum of International Development Studies (in Japanese) (29): 153–171.
- Hitomi, Sachiko (March 2008). "Kaikōjō, Kōbe to Meiji Shonen no Baishun Tōseisaku" 開港場・神戸と明治初年の売春統制策 [Governmental Control of Prostitution at the Open Port of Kobe in the Early Years of Meiji Period] (PDF). Journal of Port Cities Studies (in Japanese) (3): 89–99. Archived from the original (PDF) on March 4, 2016.
