= Groom (surname) =

Family name

Origin
- Origin: English
- Meaning: a profession, responsible for the feeding and care of horses
- Region of origin: England

Other names
- Variant forms: Grooms, Groome

Groom is a surname of English origin. Its English usage comes from the trade or profession, a person responsible for the feeding and care of horses, not to be confused with the much more socially distinguished roles in the English Royal Household of Groom of the Chamber, or Groom of the Privy Chamber, Groom of the Robes, Groom of the Stole, and Groom of the Stool.

== History ==
The English etymology for Groom comes from the East Anglian occupational name for a servant or a shepherd, from Middle English grom(e) ‘boy’, ‘servant’ (of uncertain origin), which in some places was specialized to mean ‘shepherd’.

== Popularity ==
Groom ranks 5,545 out of 88,799 in popularity in the United States and is also common in Australia, Canada, New Zealand and the United Kingdom.

== List ==
- Aaron Groom (born 1987), Fijian rugby league player
- Andy Groom (born 1979), American football punter
- Arthur Groom, multiple people, including:
  - Arthur Groom (politician) (1852–1922), Australian politician and land agent
  - Arthur Groom (writer) (1904–1953), Australian writer, conservationist, journalist and photographer
  - Arthur Hesketh Groom (1846–1918), British founder the Kobe Golf Club, Japan's first golf club
- Bob Groom (1884–1948), American baseball player
- Buddy Groom (born 1965), American baseball player
- Catherine Groom Petroski (born 1939), American author
- Charles Ottley Groom (1839–1894), British author and impostor
- Chris Groom (born 1973), former Australian rules footballer
- Harry Marshall Groom BCL (1894–1964), New Brunswick lawyer and politician
- Henry Littleton Groom (1860–1926), member of Queensland Parliament, Australia
- Jerry Groom (1929–2008), nicknamed "Boomer," American football player
- Joanna Groom, Australian Immunologist
- Kathleen Clarice Groom (1872–1954), English author
- Karl Groom, British guitarist and producer
- Sir Littleton Groom, KCMG (1867–1936), Australian Commonwealth Minister and Speaker of the House of Representatives
- Lorne B. Groom (1919–1994), New Brunswick optometrist and politician
- Mary Elizabeth Groom (1903–1958), British artist
- Michael Groom, multiple people, including:
  - Michael Groom (climber) (born 1959), Australian mountain climber
  - Michael Groom (footballer), New Zealand national football team member
- Nic Groom (born 1990), South African rugby union footballer
- Ray Groom (born 1944), Tasmanian premier (1992–1996)
- Robert Groom, multiple people, including:
  - Robert W. Groom, California State Assembly member
  - Robert Groom (cricketer) (1816–1891), English cricketer
- Roger Groom (born 1936), Australian politician
- Sam Groom (born 1939), American television actor
- Shea Groom (born 1993), American soccer player
- Simon Groom (born 1950), British television presenter
- Terry Groom (1944–2021), Australian politician
- Steve Conway (singer) (born Walter James Groom; 1920–1952), British singer
- Victor Groom (1898–1990), British Air Marshal
- William Henry Groom (1833–1901), member of the Parliament of Queensland and the Parliament of Australia
- Winston Groom (1943–2020), American novelist and nonfiction writer
