= Acom International =

Tournament information
- Location: Omitama, Ibaraki, Japan
- Established: 1990
- Course: Ishioka Golf Club
- Par: 71
- Length: 7,066 yards (6,461 m)
- Tour: Japan Golf Tour
- Format: Stableford; Modified Stableford; Stroke play
- Prize fund: ¥120,000,000
- Month played: September
- Final year: 2006

Tournament record score
- Aggregate: 266 Toru Taniguchi (2000)
- To par: −19 Hidemichi Tanaka (1999)
- Score: 51 points Kazuhiko Hosokawa (1996)

Final champion
- (Japan) Mamo Osanai
- Location in Japan Location in the Ibaraki Prefecture

The Acom International was a professional golf tournament that was held in Japan from 1990 to 2006. Sponsored by Acom, it was an event on the Japan Golf Tour, and used a modified Stableford scoring system until 1999, when it became a standard stroke play event. The purse for the final event in 2006 was ¥120,000,000, with ¥24,000,000 going to the winner.

From 1983 to 1989, Acom sponsored a pairs better ball tournament, the Acom Doubles.

== Tournament hosts ==
Year(s)	Host course	Location
1999–2006	Ishioka Golf Club	Omitama, Ibaraki
1993–1998	Seve Ballesteros Golf Club	Iwaki, Fukushima
1991	Narita Springs Country Club	Narita, Chiba
1990, 1992	Japan Classic Country Club	Iga, Mie

== Winners ==
Year	Winner	Score	To par	Margin of victory	Runner(s)-up	Ref.
Acom International
2006	(Japan) Mamo Osanai	270	−14	Playoff	(Japan) Taichi Teshima	
2005	(New Zealand) David Smail	271	−13	2 strokes	(Japan) Taichi Teshima	
2004	(Japan) Toru Suzuki	200 (Note: Shortened to 54 holes due to rain.)	−13	3 strokes	(Australia) Paul Sheehan	
2003	(Japan) Masahiro Kuramoto (2)	271	−13	Playoff	(Japan) Katsumasa Miyamoto (Japan) Masashi Ozaki	
2002	(Japan) Toru Taniguchi (2)	197	−16	1 stroke	(China) Zhang Lianwei	
2001	(Japan) Kazuhiko Hosokawa (2)	267	−17	2 strokes	(Japan) Katsumune Imai (Australia) Scott Laycock (Japan) Nobuhito Sato (Japan) Toru Taniguchi (Japan) Shinichi Yokota	
2000	(Japan) Toru Taniguchi	266	−18	6 strokes	(Japan) Yasuharu Imano	
1999	(Japan) Hidemichi Tanaka	269	−19	5 strokes	(Japan) Keiichiro Fukabori	
1998	(Japan) Kaname Yokoo	46 points		3 points	(Japan) Katsumasa Miyamoto	
1997	(Japan) Kazuo Kanayama	41 points		Playoff	(Colombia) Eduardo Herrera	
1996	(Japan) Kazuhiko Hosokawa	51 points		4 points	(Philippines) Frankie Miñoza	
1995	(Japan) Katsunori Kuwabara	46 points		5 points	(Japan) Tsukasa Watanabe	
1994	(Japan) Naomichi Ozaki	41 points		6 points	(Japan) Masayuki Kawamura	
1993	(United States) Todd Hamilton	40 points		3 points	(Australia) Craig Warren	
1992	(Japan) Hisao Inoue	41 points		4 points	(Japan) Shigenori Mori	
1991	(Japan) Masahiro Kuramoto	32 points		10 points	(Canada) Brent Franklin (Japan) Yoshi Mizumaki (Japan) Tōru Nakamura	
Acom P.T.
1990	(United States) Bob Gilder	115 points		1 point	(United States) Bob Tway	
