= Naruo Golf Club =

Golf course

Coordinates: 34°53′30.35″N 135°23′48.10″E

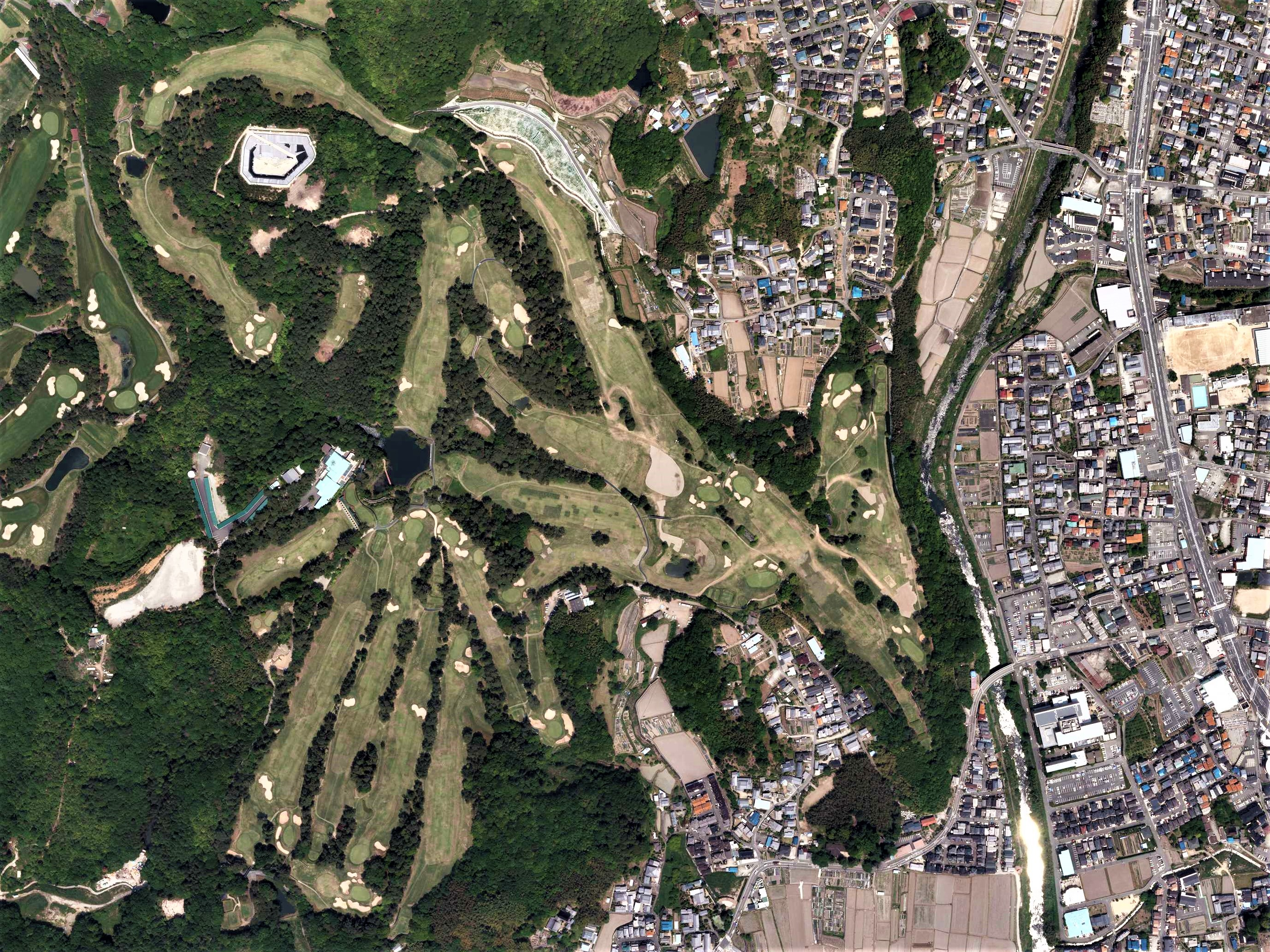
- Aerial photograph of Naruo Golf Club
- Interactive map of Naruo Golf Club

Club information
- Location: Kawanishi, Hyōgo; Japan
- Established: 1920, 106 years ago
- Type: Private
- Tota holes: 18
- Website: http://mw2pd51eas.bizmw.com/en/sitemap.html
- Designed by: Harry C. Crane; Bertie E. Crane; Redesigned(1931) by Charles H. Alison
- Par: 71
- Length: 6,564 yards (6,002 m)

Naruo Golf Club (鳴尾ゴルフ倶楽部, Naruo Golf Club), located in Kawanishi, Hyogo, is one of the oldest golf courses in Japan which is held in high regard in Japan and the world.

== History ==
=== Establishment in Naruohama ===
The origins of golf in Japan can be traced back over a century to a small private course in Kobe's Rokko mountains. During the Meiji Period, many Europeans and Americans lived in the bay-front foreign settlement in Kobe, introducing various aspects of foreign culture into Japan.

The British-born trading merchant Arthur Hesketh Groom (1846–1918) built a summerhouse atop Mt. Rokko, an area he chose for its peace and quiet as a perfect location for social gatherings. There he built a four-hole golf course. Two years later, in 1903, he expanded the course to nine holes and founded the Kobe Golf Club, the first golf club in Japan.

=== New course ===
The Naruo course was steadily expanded, and in 1924 a full 18 holes were completed. But in 1927, severe economic constraints forced the course to be shortened to nine holes.

The Club members were desperate for a new course, so they entrusted its development to the club's most stalwart members, the Crane brothers—Joe E., Harry C. and Bertie E. Crane. Every weekend the brothers inspected candidate sites all over the Kansai area until they happened upon the location where the present course was built.

=== Course completed in present-day form ===
Harry C. Crane had long sought validation of his course by a famous golf course designer. In 1930, Charles Hugh Alison came to Japan to design the Asaka course for the Tokyo Golf Club. He also designed golf courses in Hirono and Kawana. Crane asked Alison to survey the Naruo golf course and offer recommendations. Alison spent a full week on the project in early 1931. In his report he wrote, “The skeletal construction uses the site’s features well, and no changes are required.” At the same time he submitted detailed recommendations to improve 16 of the 18 holes.

=== Epic battle of the "Big 3" ===
One of the biggest days in the history of the Naruo course came in 1967 when Gary Player, Jack Nicklaus and Arnold Palmer—the “Big 3” among professional golfers of that era—held an exhibition match at Naruo.

The event was part of three stroke-play matches held around Japan and organized by Tokyo Broadcasting System Television. The first two matches were held at the Kasumigaseki Country Club East Course and the Nagoya Golf Club Wago Course, with the final round held at Naruo.

=== To a world-famous course ===
In the mid-1990s Naruo became renown through the photos taken in May 1992 by the prominent golf photographer Brian Morgan. Morgan was the official photographer for the four major worldwide tournaments. His photos of Naruo show the layout and details of the golf course. These images document one of the oldest courses in Japan, focusing on its historical and visual features.

== Tournaments ==
- Japan Senior Open Golf Championship (2010, 2020)

== Course record ==
The course record of Naruo was established by Tsutomu Irie.

== Professionals ==
Professional golfers who belong to Naruo Golf Club are;

- Yoshinori Mizumaki

== Gallery ==
Naruo Golf Club
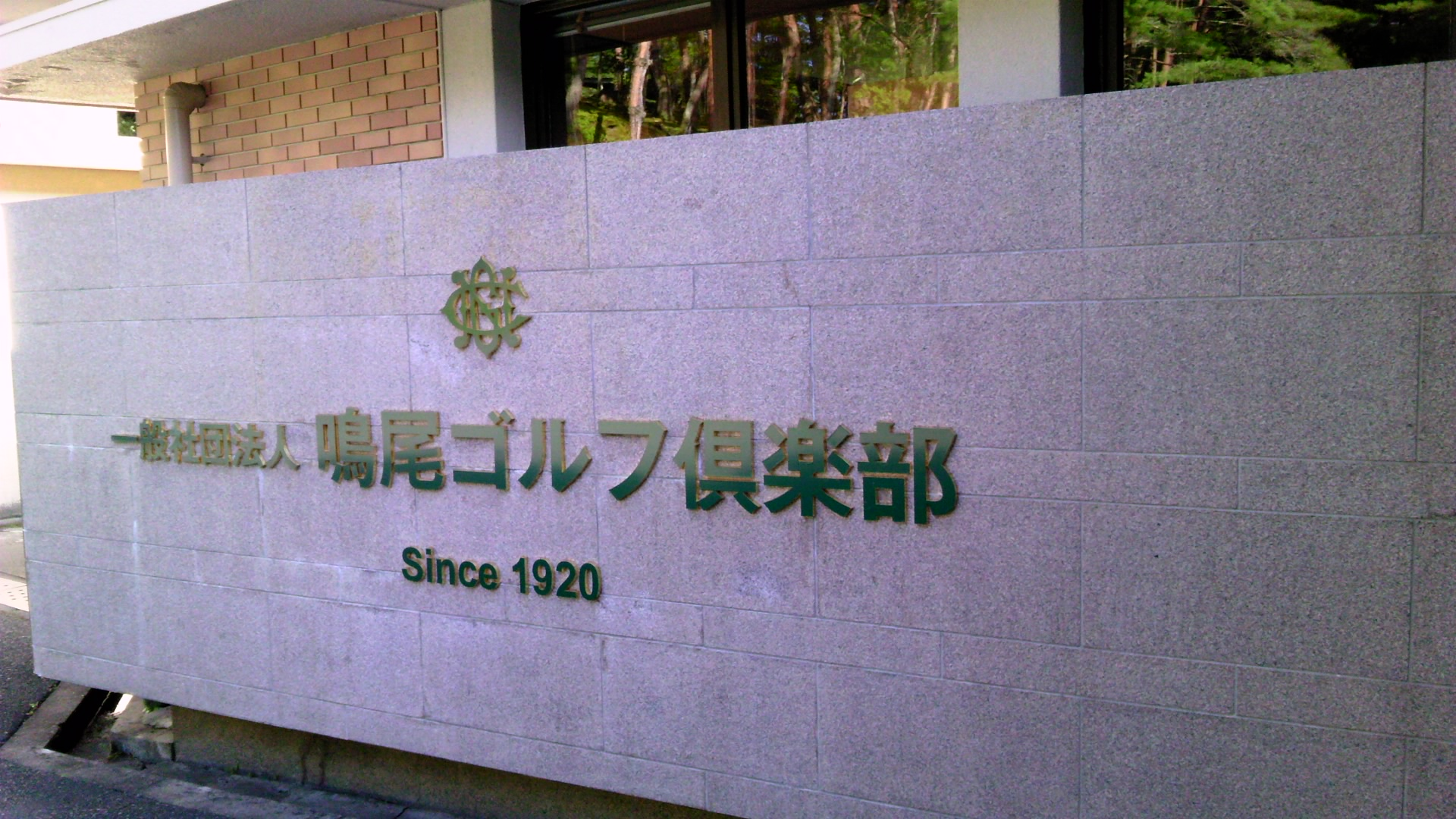
Entrance of Clubhouse

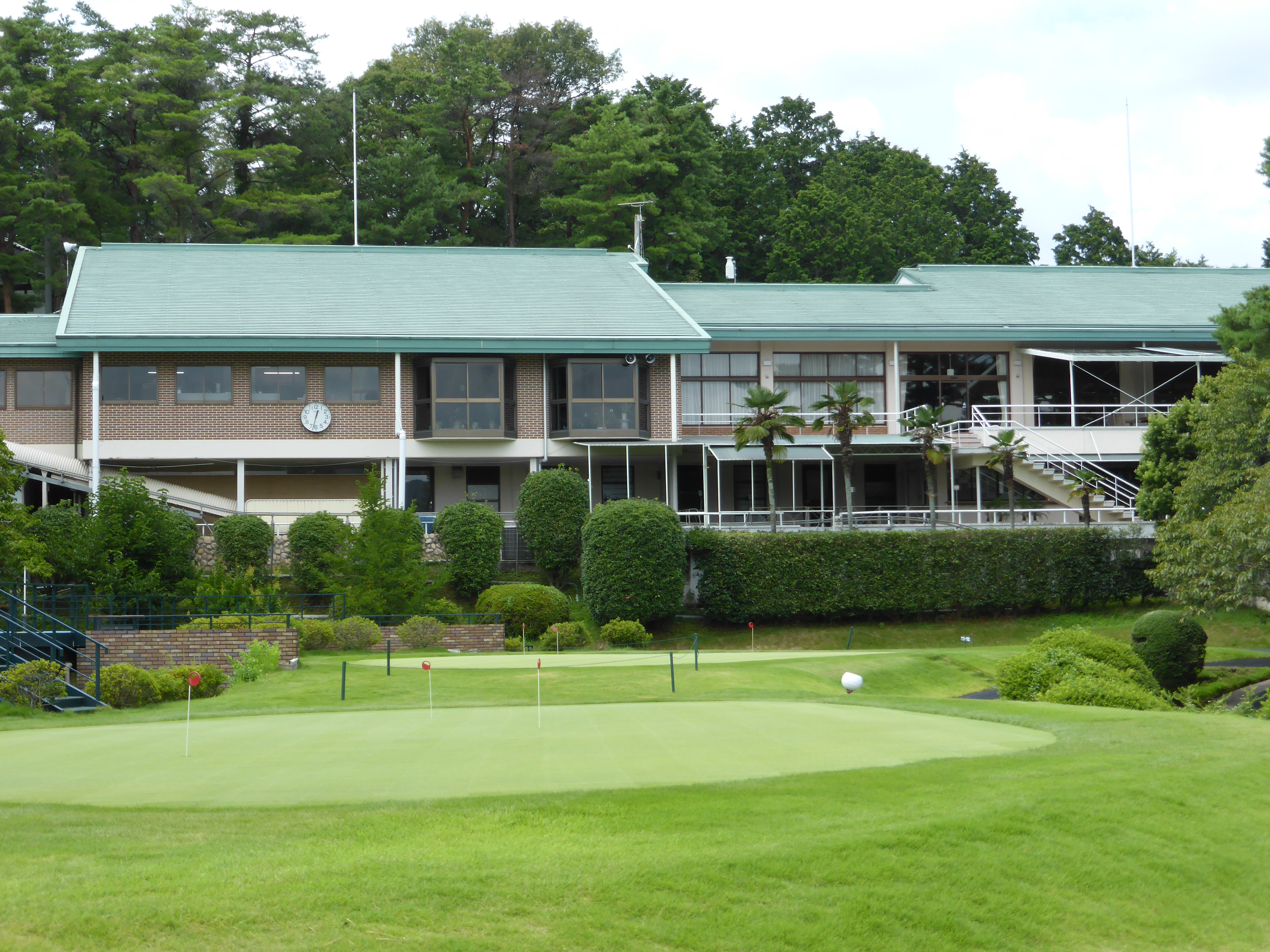
View of Clubhouse from the course
