= Tatsuhiko Takahashi =

Japanese golfer

Personal information
- Nationality: Japan
- Born: 6 June 1974 (age 52) Fukuoka Prefecture, Japan
- Height: 1.79 m (5 ft 10 in)
- Weight: 80 kg (180 lb; 13 st)

Career
- Sport: Golf
- Status: Professional
- Current tour: Japan Golf Tour
- Professional wins: 4

Number of wins by tour
- Japan Golf Tour: 2
- Other: 2

Tatsuhiko Takahashi (髙橋 竜彦, Takahashi Tatsuhiko; born 6 June 1974) is a Japanese professional golfer.

== Professional career ==
Takahashi plays on the Japan Golf Tour, and has won twice.

== Professional wins (4) ==
=== Japan Golf Tour wins (2) ===
Legend
Japan majors (1)
Other Japan Golf Tour (1)

No.	Date	Tournament	Winning score	Margin of victory	Runner-up
1	31 Jul 2005	Aiful Cup	−16 (69-64-66-69=268)	1 stroke	(Japan) Yasuaki Takashima
2	2 Jul 2006	UBS Japan Golf Tour Championship ShishidoHills	−7 (71-66-68-68=273)	3 strokes	(Japan) Tetsuji Hiratsuka

Japan Golf Tour playoff record (0–1)

No.	Year	Tournament	Opponents	Result
1	2000	PGA Philanthropy Tournament	(Japan) Tatsuya Mitsuhashi, (Japan) Masashi Shimada	Shimada won with birdie on fourth extra hole Takahashi eliminated by birdie on first hole

=== Japan Challenge Tour wins (1) ===
No.	Date	Tournament	Winning score	Margin of victory	Runner-up
1	15 Oct 1999	Shinwa Golf Classic	−6 (69-69=138)	1 stroke	(Japan) Teruyasu Hayashi

=== Other wins (1) ===
- 2005 Hitachi 3Tours Championship (with Keiichiro Fukabori, Yasuharu Imano, Toru Taniguchi, and Shinichi Yokota)

== Results in World Golf Championships ==
Tournament	2006
Match Play	
Championship	
Invitational	76

Did not play
