= Hidemichi Tanaka =

Japanese professional golfer (born 1971)

Hidemichi Tanaka 田中秀道
Personal information
- Nationality: Japan
- Born: 29 March 1971 (age 55) Hiroshima Prefecture, Japan
- Height: 1.66 m (5 ft 5 in)
- Weight: 62 kg (137 lb; 9.8 st)

Career
- Sport: Golf
- Turned professional: 1991
- Former tours: Japan Golf Tour; PGA Tour
- Professional wins: 15
- Highest ranking: 57 (28 May 2000)

Number of wins by tour
- Japan Golf Tour: 10
- Other: 5

Best results in major championships
- Masters Tournament: DNP
- PGA Championship: T55: 2004
- U.S. Open: T15: 2003
- The Open Championship: T32: 1996

Hidemichi Tanaka (田中秀道; born 29 March 1971) is a Japanese professional golfer.

== Career ==
Tanaka was born in Hiroshima Prefecture. He turned professional in 1991, joined the Japan Golf Tour in 1995 and played mainly on that tour until 2001. He won 10 times on tour.

Tanaka earned a PGA Tour card for 2002 at the 2001 Qualifying School, and held his card through 2006 by finishing in the top 125 on the money list each year. In 2006, he lost his card by finishing 224th on the money list. His best finishes on the PGA Tour are two T-3, at the 2004 B.C. Open and the 2005 Chrysler Championship.

== Professional wins (15) ==
=== Japan Golf Tour wins (10) ===
Legend
Flagship events (1)
Other Japan Golf Tour (7)

| No. | Date | Tournament | Winning score | Margin of victory | Runner(s)-up |
|---|---|---|---|---|---|
| 1 | 29 Oct 1995 | Philip Morris Championship | −10 (67-73-69-69=278) | 1 stroke | (Japan) Naomichi Ozaki, (Japan) Nobumitsu Yuhara |
| 2 | 19 May 1996 | Pepsi Ube Kosan Open | −20 (68-64-65-67=264) | 2 strokes | (Japan) Tsuneyuki Nakajima, (United States) Brian Watts |
| 3 | 26 Jul 1998 | Aiful Cup | −15 (68-70-69-66=273) | 1 stroke | (Japan) Toshimitsu Izawa, (Japan) Tatsuo Takasaki |
| 4 | 4 Oct 1998 | Japan Open Golf Championship | −5 (72-70-72-69=283) | 1 stroke | (Japan) Naomichi Ozaki |
| 5 | 13 Dec 1998 | DDI Group Okinawa Open | −11 (70-67-69-67=273) | 3 strokes | (Japan) Akihito Tokoyama |
| 6 | 7 Nov 1999 | Acom International | −19 (66-69-66-68=269) | 5 strokes | (Japan) Keiichiro Fukabori |
| 7 | 19 Mar 2000 | Dydo Drinco Shizuoka Open | −14 (66-70-70-68=274) | 2 strokes | (Japan) Eiji Mizoguchi |
| 8 | 30 Apr 2000 | The Crowns | −8 (69-69-67-67=272) | 5 strokes | (Japan) Mitsutaka Kusakabe |
| 9 | 15 Apr 2001 | Tsuruya Open | −14 (71-69-68-66=274) | 2 strokes | (Japan) Masayuki Kawamura |
| 10 | 24 Jun 2001 | Gateway to The Open Mizuno Open | −16 (66-69-68-69=272) | 3 strokes | (Colombia) Eduardo Herrera |

Japan Golf Tour playoff record (0–1)

| No. | Year | Tournament | Opponent | Result |
|---|---|---|---|---|
| 1 | 2000 | Tsuruya Open | (Australia) Richard Backwell | Lost to par on fourth extra hole |

=== Japan Challenge Tour wins (2) ===
- 1995 Mito Green Open, Korakuen Cup (2nd)

=== Other wins (3) ===
- 1996 Hirao Masaaki Pro-Am (Japan)
- 1998 Hirao Masaaki Pro-Am (Japan)
- 2001 Hawaii Pearl Open

== Results in major championships ==
| Tournament | 1996 | 1997 | 1998 | 1999 | 2000 | 2001 | 2002 | 2003 | 2004 |
|---|---|---|---|---|---|---|---|---|---|
| U.S. Open | | | | | | | T37 | T15 | T36 |
| The Open Championship | T33 | | | CUT | | CUT | | | |
| PGA Championship | | | | CUT | 79 | CUT | | | T55 |

Note: Tanaka never played in the Masters Tournament

Did not play

CUT = missed the half-way cut
"T" = tied

== Results in The Players Championship ==
| Tournament | 2003 | 2004 | 2005 | 2006 |
|---|---|---|---|---|
| The Players Championship | CUT | T81 | WD | CUT |

Did not play

CUT = missed the halfway cut
WD = withdrew
"T" indicates a tie for a place

== Results in World Golf Championships ==
| Tournament | 2000 | 2001 |
|---|---|---|
| Match Play | | R32 |
| Championship | T11 | NT^{1} |
| Invitational | | |

^{1}Cancelled due to 9/11

Did not play

QF, R16, R32, R64 = Round in which player lost in match play
"T" = Tied
NT = No tournament

== Team appearances ==
- World Cup (representing Japan): 2000, 2003, 2004

== See also ==
- 2001 PGA Tour Qualifying School graduates
- List of golfers with most Japan Golf Tour wins
