= Kazuhiko Hosokawa =

Japanese professional golfer

Kazuhiko Hosokawa 細川和彦
Personal information
- Nationality: Japan
- Born: 28 December 1970 (age 55) Joso, Ibaraki Prefecture, Japan
- Height: 1.76 m (5 ft 9 in)
- Weight: 78 kg (172 lb; 12.3 st)

Career
- Sport: Golf
- Turned professional: 1993
- Current tour: Japan PGA Senior Tour
- Former tour: Japan Golf Tour
- Professional wins: 10
- Highest ranking: 80 (5 March 2000)

Number of wins by tour
- Japan Golf Tour: 8
- Other: 2

Best results in major championships
- Masters Tournament: DNP
- PGA Championship: DNP
- U.S. Open: DNP
- The Open Championship: T70: 2000

Kazuhiko Hosokawa (Japanese: 細川和彦, born 28 December 1970) is a Japanese professional golfer.

== Career ==
Hosokawa has won eight tournaments on the Japan Golf Tour and featured in the top 100 of the Official World Golf Rankings. He has also played in The Open Championship three times where his best performance came in 2000; finishing T70.

== Professional wins (10) ==
=== Japan Golf Tour wins (8) ===
Legend
Japan majors (1)
Other Japan Golf Tour (7)

No.	Date	Tournament	Winning score	Margin of victory	Runner(s)-up
1	27 Aug 1995	Hisamitsu-KBC Augusta	−17 (69-66-67-69=271)	1 stroke	(United States) Todd Hamilton, (Japan) Tomohiro Maruyama
2	4 Aug 1996	Sanko Grand Summer Championship	−16 (68-66-68-70=272)	5 strokes	(Colombia) Eduardo Herrera
3	18 Aug 1996	Acom International	51 pts (11-14-18-8=51)	4 points	(Philippines) Frankie Miñoza
4	3 Aug 1997	NST Niigata Open Golf Championship	−11 (71-68-67-71=277)	1 stroke	(Japan) Hisayuki Sasaki
5	19 Sep 1999	ANA Open	−11 (66-70-69-72=277)	1 stroke	(Japan) Naomichi Ozaki, (Japan) Katsuyoshi Tomori
6	5 Dec 1999	Golf Nippon Series JT Cup	−10 (63-74-69-64=270)	2 strokes	(Japan) Toshimitsu Izawa
7	30 Sep 2001	Acom International (2)	−17 (68-63-65-71=267)	2 strokes	(Japan) Katsumune Imai, (Australia) Scott Laycock, (Japan) Nobuhito Sato, (Japan) Toru Taniguchi, (Japan) Shinichi Yokota
8	3 Jul 2005	Japan Golf Tour Championship Shishido Hills Cup	−7 (70-67-67-69=273)	Playoff	(Japan) Yasuharu Imano, (New Zealand) David Smail

Japan Golf Tour playoff record (1–4)

No.	Year	Tournament	Opponent(s)	Result
1	1998	Sanko Grand Summer Championship	(Japan) Shingo Katayama	Lost to par on third extra hole
2	1999	Descente Classic Munsingwear Cup	(Japan) Masayuki Kawamura, (Japan) Tsuyoshi Yoneyama	Kawamura won with birdie on second extra hole
3	1999	Mitsubishi Motors Tournament	(Japan) Tsuyoshi Yoneyama	Lost to birdie on fifth extra hole
4	2004	Coca-Cola Tokai Classic	(Japan) Katsumune Imai	Lost to par on first extra hole
5	2005	Japan Golf Tour Championship Shishido Hills Cup	(Japan) Yasuharu Imano, (New Zealand) David Smail	Won with par on second extra hole

=== Japan Challenge Tour wins (1) ===
- 1994 Korakuen Cup (1st)

=== Japan PGA Senior Tour wins (1) ===
No.	Date	Tournament	Winning score	Margin of victory	Runner-up
1	6 Nov 2021	Cosmo Health Cup Senior Tournament	−9 (66-69=135)	Playoff	(Japan) Mamo Osanai

== Results in major championships ==
Tournament	1998	1999	2000
The Open Championship	77	CUT	T70

Note: Hosokawa only played in The Open Championship.
CUT = missed the half-way cut
"T" = tied

== Results in World Golf Championships ==
Tournament	1999	2000	2001	2002	2003	2004	2005
Match Play							
Championship	T53		NT^{1}				
Invitational							65

^{1}Cancelled due to 9/11

Did not play

"T" = Tied
NT = No tournament
