= Sanko Grand Summer Championship =

Tournament information
- Location: Takasaki, Gunma, Japan
- Established: 1990
- Course: Sanko 72 Country Club
- Par: 72
- Length: 7,066 yards (6,461 m)
- Tour: Japan Golf Tour
- Format: Stroke play
- Prize fund: ¥100,000,000
- Month played: August
- Final year: 1998

Tournament record score
- Aggregate: 267 Frankie Miñoza (1995)
- To par: −21 as above

Final champion
- (Japan) Shingo Katayama
- Location in Japan Location in the Gunma Prefecture

The Sanko Grand Summer Championship was a professional golf tournament that was held in Japan during the 1990s. It was an event on the Japan Golf Tour from 1995 to 1998. It was played in August at the Sanko 72 Country Club in Takasaki, Gunma Prefecture.

== Winners ==
Year	Winner	Score	To par	Margin of victory	Runner(s)-up	Ref.
1998	(Japan) Shingo Katayama	274	−14	Playoff	(Japan) Kazuhiko Hosokawa	
1997	(Japan) Shoichi Kuwabara	271	−17	1 stroke	(Japan) Masashi Shimada (Japan) Taichi Teshima	
1996	(Japan) Kazuhiko Hosokawa	272	−16	4 strokes	(Colombia) Eduardo Herrera	
1995	(Philippines) Frankie Miñoza	267	−21	4 strokes	(Japan) Shinji Ikeuchi	
1994	(Japan) Toru Suzuki					
1993	(Japan) Tsukasa Watanabe					
1992	(Japan) Masashi Ozaki					
1991	(Japan) Seiji Ebihara					
1990	(Japan) Hideki Kase					
