= Sun Chlorella Classic =

Tournament information
- Location: Otaru, Hokkaido, Japan
- Established: 2000
- Course: Otaru Country Club
- Par: 72
- Length: 7,471 yards (6,831 m)
- Tour: Japan Golf Tour
- Format: Stroke play
- Prize fund: ¥150,000,000
- Month played: July
- Final year: 2012

Tournament record score
- Aggregate: 269 Brendan Jones (2002); 269 Naomichi Ozaki (2002); 269 Christian Peña (2002)
- To par: −19 as above

Final champion
- (Australia) Brendan Jones
- Location in Japan Location in Hokkaido

The Sun Chlorella Classic (サン・クロレラクラシック, San kurorera kurashikku) was a golf tournament on the Japan Golf Tour from 2000 to 2012. The tournament record was 269 (19 under par), set by Christian Peña, Brendan Jones and Naomichi Ozaki in 2002; Peña won the title in a playoff. In its final year, in 2012, it was played in late July and the prize fund was ¥150,000,000 with ¥30,000,000 going to the winner.

== Tournament hosts ==
Year(s)	Host course	Location
2004–2012	Otaru Country Club	Otaru, Hokkaido
2001–2003	Sapporo Bay Golf Club	Ishikari, Hokkaido
2000	Sapporo Kokusai Country Club (Shimamatsu Course)	Kitahiroshima, Hokkaido

== Winners ==
Year	Winner	Score	To par	Margin of victory	Runner(s)-up
2012	(Australia) Brendan Jones (2)	273	−15	2 strokes	(South Korea) Lee Seong-ho (Japan) Hideki Matsuyama (Japan) Yoshinobu Tsukada
2011	(Japan) Yuta Ikeda	274	−14	1 stroke	(Japan) Tetsuji Hiratsuka
2010	(Japan) Tadahiro Takayama	271	−17	3 strokes	(Fiji) Dinesh Chand
2009	(Japan) Ryo Ishikawa	271	−17	1 stroke	(Australia) Brendan Jones
2008	(Japan) Takuya Taniguchi	284	−4	1 stroke	(Japan) Hideto Tanihara
2007	(Japan) Jun Kikuchi	283	−5	Playoff	(Japan) Toru Suzuki
2006	(Japan) Hideto Tanihara	283	−5	1 stroke	(Japan) Hiroyuki Fujita (Japan) Tetsuji Hiratsuka (Thailand) Prayad Marksaeng (Japan) Katsumasa Miyamoto (Japan) Masaya Tomida
2005	(Japan) Keiichiro Fukabori	273	−15	1 stroke	(Japan) Hidemasa Hoshino
2004	(South Korea) Yang Yong-eun	275	−13	3 strokes	(New Zealand) David Smail (Taiwan) Yeh Wei-tze
2003	(Australia) Brendan Jones	280	−8	Playoff	(Japan) Daisuke Maruyama (Japan) Taichi Teshima
2002	(United States) Christian Peña	269	−19	Playoff	(Australia) Brendan Jones (Japan) Naomichi Ozaki
2001	(Japan) Hiroyuki Fujita	283	−5	Playoff	(Japan) Katsuyoshi Tomori
2000	(Japan) Masashi Ozaki	276	−12	Playoff	(Japan) Shoichi Yamamoto
