= Miyazato =

Miyazato (Japanese: 宮里) is a Ryukyuan surname. Notable people with the surname include:

- Ai Miyazato (born 1985), Japanese golfer
- Eiichi Miyazato (1922–1999), Japanese karate coach and judoka
- Kiyoshi Miyazato (born 1977), Japanese golfer
- Mika Miyazato (born 1989), Japanese golfer
- Yūsaku Miyazato (born 1980), Japanese golfer
