= Yoshi Mizumaki =

Japanese professional golfer

Personal information
- Full name: Yoshinori Mizumaki
- Nationality: Japan
- Born: 27 August 1958 (age 68) Tokyo, Japan
- Height: 1.78 m (5 ft 10 in)
- Weight: 82 kg (181 lb; 12.9 st)

Career
- Sport: Golf
- Turned professional: 1984
- Current tour: Japan PGA Senior Tour
- Former tours: Japan Golf Tour; PGA Tour
- Professional wins: 11

Number of wins by tour
- Japan Golf Tour: 7
- Other: 4

Best results in major championships
- Masters Tournament: DNP
- PGA Championship: DNP
- U.S. Open: DNP
- The Open Championship: T27: 1993

Yoshinori Mizumaki (水巻 善典, Mizumaki Yoshinori; born 27 August 1958) is a Japanese professional golfer.

== Career ==
Mizumaki, graduate of Hosei University, played on the Japan Golf Tour, winning seven times. He also played on the PGA Tour in 1994 and 1995. His best finish was a tie for second (playoff loss to Neal Lancaster) in the 1994 GTE Byron Nelson Golf Classic. He belongs to Naruo Golf Club in Hyogo Prefecture.

== Professional wins (11) ==
=== Japan Golf Tour wins (7) ===
| No. | Date | Tournament | Winning score | Margin of victory | Runner(s)-up |
|---|---|---|---|---|---|
| 1 | 3 Sep 1989 | Kanto Open | −7 (68-69-74-70=281) | 1 stroke | (Japan) Isao Aoki |
| 2 | 6 Jun 1993 | JCB Classic Sendai | −11 (70-64-69-70=273) | Playoff | (Japan) Hajime Meshiai, (Japan) Tsukasa Watanabe |
| 3 | 10 Apr 1994 | Pocari Sweat Open | −10 (72-65-66=203) (Note: Shortened to 54 holes due to weather.) | 1 stroke | (Japan) Tsukasa Watanabe |
| 4 | 12 Jun 1994 | Sapporo Tokyu Open | −11 (65-70-68-74=277) | 1 stroke | (Colombia) Eduardo Herrera |
| 5 | 13 Oct 1996 | Golf Digest Tournament | −11 (66-67-68-72=273) | 1 stroke | (Japan) Satoshi Higashi, (Japan) Shoichi Kuwabara |
| 6 | 7 Jun 1998 | JCB Classic Sendai (2) | −14 (68-66-68-68=270) | 1 stroke | (Japan) Shigeki Maruyama |
| 7 | 18 Jun 2000 | Tamanoi Yomiuri Open | −17 (66-68-70-67=271) | 3 strokes | (Japan) Hisayuki Sasaki |

Japan Golf Tour playoff record (1–0)

| No. | Year | Tournament | Opponents | Result |
|---|---|---|---|---|
| 1 | 1993 | JCB Classic Sendai | (Japan) Hajime Meshiai, (Japan) Tsukasa Watanabe | Won with birdie on sixth extra hole |

=== Japan Challenge Tour wins (1) ===
| No. | Date | Tournament | Winning score | Margin of victory | Runner-up |
|---|---|---|---|---|---|
| 1 | 8 Jun 2007 | Segasammy Challenge | −13 (68-63=131) | 2 strokes | (Japan) Shintaro Kai |

=== Japan PGA Senior Tour wins (3) ===
| No. | Date | Tournament | Winning score | Margin of victory | Runner(s)-up |
|---|---|---|---|---|---|
| 1 | 17 Sep 2011 | Sakakibara Onsen Golf Club Senior | −12 (64-68=132) | 5 strokes | (Japan) Teruo Nakamura |
| 2 | 10 Nov 2016 | Fukuoka Senior Open | −6 (71-67=138) | 1 stroke | (Japan) Takeshi Sakiyama, (Japan) Kazuhiro Takami |
| 3 | 14 Nov 2020 | Cosmo Health Cup Senior Tournament | −8 (67-69=136) | 2 strokes | (Japan) Toshimitsu Izawa, (United States) Gregory Meyer, (Japan) Shigeru Nonaka, (Japan) Hiroo Okamo, (Japan) Norio Shinozaki |

== Playoff record ==
PGA Tour playoff record (0–1)

| No. | Year | Tournament | Opponents | Result |
|---|---|---|---|---|
| 1 | 1994 | GTE Byron Nelson Golf Classic | (United States) Tom Byrum, (United States) Mark Carnevale, (United States) David Edwards, (United States) Neal Lancaster, (United States) David Ogrin | Lancaster won with birdie on first extra hole |

== Results in major championships ==
| Tournament | 1993 | 1994 | 1995 | 1996 | 1997 | 1998 | 1999 | 2000 |
|---|---|---|---|---|---|---|---|---|
| The Open Championship | T27 | | | | | CUT | | CUT |

Did not play

CUT = missed the half-way cut
"T" = tied
Note: Mizumaki only played in The Open Championship.

== Team appearances ==
- Dunhill Cup (representing Japan): 1993, 1994

== See also ==
- 1993 PGA Tour Qualifying School graduates
