= Tatsuya Mitsuhashi =

Japanese professional golfer

Personal information
- Nationality: Japan
- Born: 14 January 1973 (age 53) Hiroshima Prefecture, Japan
- Height: 1.69 m (5 ft 7 in)
- Weight: 75 kg (165 lb; 11.8 st)

Career
- Sport: Golf
- Status: Professional
- Former tour: Japan Golf Tour
- Professional wins: 1

Number of wins by tour
- Japan Golf Tour: 1

Tatsuya Mitsuhashi (born 14 January 1973) is a Japanese professional golfer.

== Career ==
Mitsuhashi played on the Japan Golf Tour, winning once.

== Professional wins (1) ==
=== Japan Golf Tour wins (1) ===
No.	Date	Tournament	Winning score	Margin of victory	Runners-up
1	23 May 2004	Munsingwear Open KSB Cup	−18 (66-71-63-70=270)	2 strokes	(Japan) Shingo Katayama, (Japan) Nobuhiro Masuda, (India) Jeev Milkha Singh

Japan Golf Tour playoff record (0–1)

No.	Year	Tournament	Opponents	Result
1	2000	PGA Philanthropy Tournament	(Japan) Masashi Shimada, (Japan) Tatsuhiko Takahashi	Shimada won with birdie on fourth extra hole Takahashi eliminated by birdie on first hole
