= Jun Kikuchi =

Japanese professional golfer

Personal information
- Nationality: Japan
- Born: 22 December 1973 (age 52) Saitama Prefecture, Japan
- Height: 1.70 m (5 ft 7 in)
- Weight: 74 kg (163 lb; 11.7 st)

Career
- Sport: Golf
- Status: Professional
- Current tour: Japan Golf Tour
- Professional wins: 1

Number of wins by tour
- Japan Golf Tour: 1

Jun Kikuchi (born 22 December 1973) is a Japanese professional golfer.

== Career ==
Kikuchi plays on the Japan Golf Tour, where he has won once.

== Professional wins (1) ==
=== Japan Golf Tour wins (1) ===
No.	Date	Tournament	Winning score	Margin of victory	Runner-up
1	5 Aug 2007	Sun Chlorella Classic	−5 (69-73-73-68=283)	Playoff	(Japan) Toru Suzuki

Japan Golf Tour playoff record (1–0)

No.	Year	Tournament	Opponent	Result
1	2007	Sun Chlorella Classic	(Japan) Toru Suzuki	Won with par on third extra hole
