= Takuya Taniguchi =

Japanese professional golfer

Personal information
- Nationality: Japan
- Born: 17 September 1979 (age 47) Tokushima Prefecture, Japan
- Height: 1.75 m (5 ft 9 in)
- Weight: 78 kg (172 lb; 12.3 st)

Career
- Sport: Golf
- Turned professional: 2002
- Current tour: Japan Golf Tour
- Former tour: Japan Challenge Tour
- Professional wins: 3

Number of wins by tour
- Japan Golf Tour: 2
- Other: 1

Achievements and awards
- Japan Golf Tour Rookie of the Year: 2004

Takuya Taniguchi (谷口 拓也, Taniguchi Takuya; born 17 September 1979 in Tokushima Prefecture) is a Japanese professional golfer.

== Professional career ==
Taniguchi plays on the Japan Golf Tour. He has won twice on tour and once on the Japan Challenge Tour.

== Professional wins (3) ==
=== Japan Golf Tour wins (2) ===
| No. | Date | Tournament | Winning score | Margin of victory | Runner-up |
|---|---|---|---|---|---|
| 1 | 1 Aug 2004 | Aiful Cup | −14 (68-67-66-69=270) | 2 strokes | (Japan) Katsumasa Miyamoto |
| 2 | 3 Aug 2008 | Sun Chlorella Classic | −4 (70-72-74-68=284) | 1 stroke | (Japan) Hideto Tanihara |

=== Japan Challenge Tour wins (1) ===
| No. | Date | Tournament | Winning score | Margin of victory | Runner-up |
|---|---|---|---|---|---|
| 1 | 13 Jun 2003 | Aiful Challenge Cup Spring | −13 (66-65=131) | Playoff | (Japan) Ryuichi Oda |

== Team appearances ==
- World Cup (representing Japan): 2005
- Dynasty Cup (representing Japan): 2005
