= Robert Groom =

Robert Groom may refer to:

- Bob Groom (1884–1948), baseball pitcher
- Robert Groom (cricketer) (1816–1891), English cricketer
- Robert W. Groom (1824–1899), member of the 1860–61 California State Assembly
