= Okinawa Open =

Golf tournament in Japan

Asia Japan Okinawa Open
Tournament information
- Location: Yaese, Okinawa, Japan
- Established: 2002
- Course: Naha Golf Club
- Par: 71
- Length: 6,789 yards (6,208 m)
- Tours: Japan Golf Tour; Asian Tour
- Format: Stroke play
- Prize fund: US$830,000
- Month played: December
- Final year: 2005

Tournament record score
- Aggregate: 270 Kiyoshi Miyazato (2004)
- To par: −14 as above

Final champion
- (Japan) Tadahiro Takayama
- Location in Japan Location in the Okinawa Prefecture

The Asia Japan Okinawa Open was a men's professional golf tournament that was co-sanctioned by the Asian Tour and the Japan Golf Tour. It was played each December from 2002 to 2005 and counted as the first official money event of the following season for both tours, that is for example the 2005 event was part of the 2006 season. The prize fund was US$830,000 each of the first two years.

== Tournament hosts ==
Years	Venue	Location
2005–2006	Naha Golf Club	Yaese, Okinawa
2003–2004	The Southern Links Golf Club	Yaese, Okinawa

== Winners ==
Year	Tours (Note: JPN − Japan Golf Tour; ASA − Asian Tour.)	Winner	Score	To par	Margin of victory	Runner(s)-up
Asia Japan Okinawa Open
2005	ASA, JPN	(Japan) Tadahiro Takayama	276	−8	Playoff	(Japan) Kiyoshi Miyazato
2004	ASA, JPN	(Japan) Kiyoshi Miyazato	270	−14	1 stroke	(Australia) Scott Barr (Japan) Hideki Kase (Japan) Masahiro Kuramoto (Japan) Mamo Osanai (India) Jeev Milkha Singh (South Korea) Charlie Wi
2003	ASA, JPN	(Japan) Hideto Tanihara	279	−9	3 strokes	(South Korea) Chung Joon (Japan) Hiroshi Gohda (Japan) Yūsaku Miyazato (South Korea) Ted Oh (South Korea) Charlie Wi (Scotland) Simon Yates (Japan) Tsuyoshi Yoneyama
2002	ASA, JPN	(Japan) Hiroyuki Fujita	202 (Note: Shortened to 54 holes due to weather.)	−14	3 strokes	(Japan) Yūsaku Miyazato (United States) Ted Purdy

=== Earlier tournament ===
An earlier Okinawa Open was played at Awase Meadows golf course from 1961 until 1972.

- 1972 Chen Chien-chin
- 1971 Hung Fa
- 1970 Hiroshi Nomiyama
- 1969 Chang Tung-chan
- 1968 Frank Kadota
- 1967 Chen Chien-chin
- 1966 Hsu Sheng-san
- 1965 Bick Long
- 1964 Finegan Higa
- 1963 Kuo Chie Hsiung
- 1962 Kuo Chie Hsiung
- 1961 Horace Meredith
