= 1996 PGA of Japan Tour =

Golf tour season

1996 PGA of Japan Tour season
- Duration: 7 March 1996 – 8 December 1996
- Number of official events: 36
- Most wins: (Japan) Masashi Ozaki (8)
- Money list: (Japan) Masashi Ozaki

The 1996 PGA of Japan Tour was the 24th season of the PGA of Japan Tour, the main professional golf tour in Japan since it was formed in 1973.

== Schedule ==
The following table lists official events during the 1996 season.

| Date | Tournament | Location | Purse (¥) | Winner (Note: The number in brackets after each winner's name is the number of PGA of Japan Tour events they had won up to and including that tournament. This information is only shown for PGA of Japan Tour members.) | OWGR points | Other tours (Note: AGC − Asia Golf Circuit.) | Notes |
|---|---|---|---|---|---|---|---|
| 10 Mar | Token Corporation Cup | Kagoshima | 100,000,000 | (Japan) Yoshinori Kaneko (3) | 20 | | |
| 17 Mar | Dydo Drinco Shizuoka Open | Shizuoka | 100,000,000 | (Japan) Yoshikazu Sakamoto (1) | 16 | | |
| 24 Mar | Novell KSB Open | Okayama | 70,000,000 | (Japan) Toru Suzuki (3) | 16 | | |
| 7 Apr | Descente Classic Munsingwear Cup | Ibaraki | 90,000,000 | (Japan) Masanobu Kimura (3) | 16 | | |
| 14 Apr | Tsuruya Open | Hyōgo | 100,000,000 | (Australia) Peter McWhinney (1) | 16 | | |
| 21 Apr | Kirin Open | Ibaraki | 100,000,000 | (Japan) Yoshinori Kaneko (4) | 16 | AGC | |
| 28 Apr | The Crowns | Aichi | 120,000,000 | (Japan) Masashi Ozaki (75) | 28 | | |
| 5 May | Fujisankei Classic | Shizuoka | 120,000,000 | (United States) Brian Watts (8) | 20 | | |
| 12 May | Japan PGA Championship | Okayama | 100,000,000 | (Japan) Masashi Ozaki (76) | 22 | | |
| 19 May | Pepsi Ube Kosan Open | Yamaguchi | 80,000,000 | (Japan) Hidemichi Tanaka (2) | 18 | | |
| 26 May | Mitsubishi Galant Tournament | Ibaraki | 120,000,000 | (Japan) Masashi Ozaki (77) | 22 | | |
| 2 Jun | JCB Classic Sendai | Miyagi | 100,000,000 | (Japan) Masashi Ozaki (78) | 18 | | |
| 9 Jun | Sapporo Tokyu Open | Hokkaidō | 100,000,000 | (Japan) Hajime Meshiai (8) | 16 | | |
| 16 Jun | Pocari Sweat Yomiuri Open | Tokyo | 100,000,000 | (Japan) Kazuhiro Fukunaga (1) | 18 | | |
| 23 Jun | Mizuno Open | Ishikawa | 100,000,000 | (Japan) Yoshinori Kaneko (5) | 18 | | |
| 30 Jun | PGA Philanthropy Tournament | Nara | 100,000,000 | (United States) Todd Hamilton (6) | 16 | | |
| 7 Jul | Yonex Open Hiroshima | Hiroshima | 80,000,000 | (Japan) Hideyuki Sato (1) | 16 | | |
| 14 Jul | Nikkei Cup Torakichi Nakamura Memorial | Ibaraki | 100,000,000 | (Japan) Hideki Kase (3) | 16 | | |
| 28 Jul | NST Niigata Open Golf Championship | Niigata | 60,000,000 | (Japan) Masatoshi Horikawa (1) | 16 | | |
| 4 Aug | Sanko Grand Summer Championship | Gunma | 100,000,000 | (Japan) Kazuhiko Hosokawa (2) | 16 | | |
| 18 Aug | Acom International | Fukushima | 100,000,000 | (Japan) Kazuhiko Hosokawa (3) | 16 | | |
| 25 Aug | Hisamitsu-KBC Augusta | Fukuoka | 100,000,000 | (Japan) Masashi Ozaki (79) | 20 | | |
| 1 Sep | Japan PGA Match-Play Championship Promise Cup | Hokkaidō | 70,000,000 | (Japan) Nobuo Serizawa (4) | 18 | | |
| 8 Sep | Suntory Open | Chiba | 100,000,000 | (Japan) Hajime Meshiai (9) | 26 | | |
| 15 Sep | ANA Open | Hokkaidō | 100,000,000 | (Paraguay) Carlos Franco (3) | 16 | | |
| 22 Sep | Gene Sarazen Jun Classic | Tochigi | 110,000,000 | (Japan) Masashi Ozaki (80) | 16 | | |
| 29 Sep | Japan Open Golf Championship | Osaka | 120,000,000 | (United States) Peter Teravainen (1) | 32 | | Flagship event |
| 6 Oct | Tokai Classic | Aichi | 110,000,000 | (Japan) Masanobu Kimura (4) | 22 | | |
| 13 Oct | Golf Digest Tournament | Shizuoka | 100,000,000 | (Japan) Yoshi Mizumaki (5) | 16 | | |
| 20 Oct | Bridgestone Open | Chiba | 120,000,000 | (Japan) Shigeki Maruyama (3) | 34 | | |
| 27 Oct | Philip Morris Championship | Hyōgo | 200,000,000 | (Japan) Naomichi Ozaki (23) | 22 | | |
| 10 Nov | Sumitomo Visa Taiheiyo Masters | Shizuoka | 150,000,000 | (England) Lee Westwood (n/a) | 24 | | |
| 17 Nov | Dunlop Phoenix Tournament | Miyazaki | 200,000,000 | (Japan) Masashi Ozaki (81) | 38 | | |
| 24 Nov | Casio World Open | Kagoshima | 150,000,000 | (United States) Paul Stankowski (n/a) | 30 | | |
| 1 Dec | Golf Nippon Series Hitachi Cup | Tokyo | 100,000,000 | (Japan) Masashi Ozaki (82) | 22 | | |
| 8 Dec | Daikyo Open | Okinawa | 120,000,000 | (Colombia) Eduardo Herrera (2) | 16 | | |

== Money list ==
The money list was based on prize money won during the season, calculated in Japanese yen.

| Position | Player | Prize money (¥) |
|---|---|---|
| 1 | (Japan) Masashi Ozaki | 209,646,746 |
| 2 | (Japan) Yoshinori Kaneko | 117,697,448 |
| 3 | (United States) Brian Watts | 89,346,882 |
| 4 | (Japan) Kazuhiko Hosokawa | 79,510,295 |
| 5 | (Japan) Shigeki Maruyama | 75,961,133 |

== Japan Challenge Tour ==
1996 Japan Challenge Tour season
- Duration: 27 March 1996 – 16 November 1996
- Number of official events: 12
- Most wins: (Japan) Hitoshi Kato (2) (Japan) Nobuhito Sato (2)

The 1996 Japan Challenge Tour was the 12th season of the Japan Challenge Tour, the official development tour to the PGA of Japan Tour.

=== Schedule ===
The following table lists official events during the 1996 season.

| Date | Tournament | Location | Purse (¥) | Winner (Note: The number in brackets after each winner's name is the number of Japan Challenge Tour events they had won up to and including that tournament. It is rare for someone to accumulate many wins on the Japan Challenge Tour as success at this level usually leads to promotion to the PGA of Japan Tour.) |
|---|---|---|---|---|
| 28 Mar | Sanko 72 Open | Gunma | 10,000,000 | (Japan) Masayuki Okano (1) |
| 18 Apr | Korakuen Cup (1st) | Tochigi | 10,000,000 | (Japan) Hideyuki Sato (2) |
| 17 May | Nishino Cup in Central | Ibaraki | 10,000,000 | (Japan) Mitsuhiro Watanabe (1) |
| 23 May | Kabaya Ohayo Cup | Ibaraki | 10,000,000 | (Japan) Hitoshi Kato (1) |
| 6 Jun | Mito Green Open | Ibaraki | 10,000,000 | (Japan) Daisuke Serizawa (1) |
| 3 Jul | Korakuen Cup (2nd) | Hokkaido | 10,000,000 | (Japan) Toshinori Horiki (1) |
| 24 Jul | Twin Fields Cup | Ishikawa | 10,000,000 | (Japan) Hitoshi Sasaki (1) |
| 5 Sep | Kabaya Ohayo Cup | Mie | 10,000,000 | (Japan) Nobuhito Sato (1) |
| 26 Sep | Matsugamine Open | Niigata | 10,000,000 | (Japan) Nobuhito Sato (2) |
| 28 Sep | Korakuen Cup (3rd) | Oita | 10,000,000 | (Japan) Satoshi Ogawa (1) |
| 5 Oct | Daiwa Cup Yamanashi Open | Yamanashi | 10,000,000 | (Japan) Taisei Inagaki (1) |
| 16 Nov | Korakuen Cup (4th) | Ibaraki | 10,000,000 | (Japan) Hitoshi Kato (2) |
