= Harumitsu Hamano =

Japanese golfer

Personal information
- Nationality: Japan
- Born: 1 September 1957 (age 69) Fukuoka Prefecture, Japan
- Height: 1.80 m (5 ft 11 in)
- Weight: 72 kg (159 lb; 11.3 st)

Career
- Sport: Golf
- Status: Professional
- Former tour: Japan Golf Tour
- Professional wins: 2

Number of wins by tour
- Japan Golf Tour: 2

Harumitsu Hamano (浜野 治光, Hamano Harumitsu; born 1 September 1957) is a Japanese professional golfer.

== Career ==
Hamano played on the Japan Golf Tour, winning twice.

== Professional wins (2) ==
=== PGA of Japan Tour wins (2) ===
No.	Date	Tournament	Winning score	Margin of victory	Runner-up
1	7 Jul 1991	PGA Philanthropy Tournament	−15 (65-67-70-71=273)	4 strokes	(Japan) Masashi Ozaki
2	20 Oct 1991	Asahi Beer Golf Digest Tournament	−11 (69-68-71-65=273)	1 stroke	(Japan) Masashi Ozaki
