= Takeshi Kajikawa =

Japanese professional golfer (born 1971)

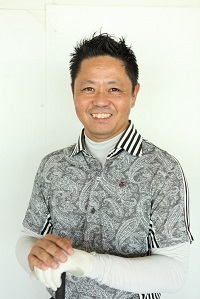

Personal information
- Nationality: Japan
- Born: 13 May 1971 (age 55) Chiba Prefecture, Japan
- Height: 1.67 m (5 ft 6 in)
- Weight: 66 kg (146 lb; 10.4 st)

Career
- Sport: Golf
- Status: Professional
- Current tour: Japan Golf Tour
- Professional wins: 3

Takeshi Kajikawa (梶川 武志, Kajikawa Takeshi; born 13 May 1971) is a Japanese professional golfer.

== Career ==
Kajikawa was born in Chiba Prefecture. After turning professional he would play on and off between the Japan Golf Tour and the Japan Challenge Tour. He has not yet won on the Japan Golf Tour but has three wins on the Challenge Tour: one in 2004 and two in 2005.

== Professional wins (3) ==
=== Japan Challenge Tour wins (3) ===
| No. | Date | Tournament | Winning score | Margin of victory | Runner(s)-up |
|---|---|---|---|---|---|
| 1 | 10 Sep 2004 | 4th PGM Series Ohinata Challenge | −10 (70-64=134) | 2 strokes | (Japan) Mitsuo Harada, (Japan) Tatsuya Tanioka |
| 2 | 8 Jul 2005 | 1st PGM Series World Challenge | −14 (68-62=130) | Playoff | (Japan) Shoichi Ideguchi |
| 3 | 16 Sep 2005 | 5th PGM Series Matsushima Chisan Challenge | −10 (67-67=134) | 1 stroke | (Japan) Toru Morita |
