= Harry Marshall Groom =

Canadian politician (1894–1964)

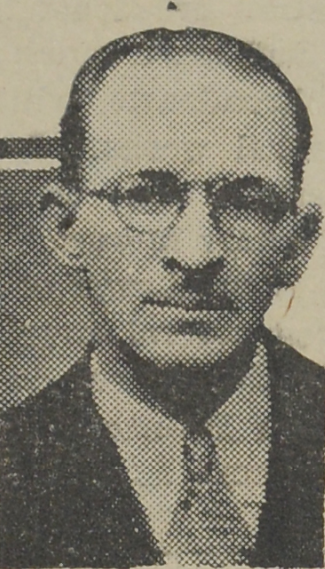
Groom, pictured in a 1935 newspaper

Harry Marshall Groom BCL (July 9, 1894 – May 19, 1964) was a Canadian lawyer and politician in the Province of New Brunswick. He was born in Bocabec, New Brunswick, the son of John Marshall Groom and Lucy Jane McKay. He graduated in 1922 from the University of New Brunswick with a Bachelor of Civil Law degree. In 1924, he married Mabel Albina McMillan (1894–1982) of Head of Millstream in New Brunswick.

Groom was elected to the Legislative Assembly in the 1930 New Brunswick general election as a Progressive Conservative Party candidate in the multi-member riding of Charlotte County.

Harry Groom died on May 19, 1964, in St. Stephen, New Brunswick, and is buried in the St. Stephen Rural Cemetery.

== See also ==
- List of people with surname Groom

Legislative Assembly of New Brunswick
Preceded by Arthur R. MacKenzie	MLA for Charlotte County; 1930–1935	Succeeded by Alexander D. Dyas
