= Aiful Cup =

The Golf Tournament in Omaezaki
Tournament information
- Location: Omaezaki, Shizuoka, Japan
- Established: 1998
- Courses: Shizuoka Country Hamaoka Course & Hotel
- Par: 71
- Length: 6,922 yards (6,329 m)
- Tour: Japan Golf Tour
- Format: Stroke play
- Prize fund: ¥120,000,000
- Month played: July
- Final year: 2006

Tournament record score
- Aggregate: 268 Yasuharu Imano (2002); 268 Tatsuhiko Takahashi (2005)
- To par: −20 Yasuharu Imano (2002)

Final champion
- (Japan) Toru Taniguchi
- Location in Japan Location in the Shizuoka Prefecture

The Aiful Cup was a professional golf tournament held in Japan from 1998 to 2006. It was an event on the Japan Golf Tour and was played at a variety of courses throughout Japan. The final event in 2006 was titled The Golf Tournament in Omaezaki with a purse of ¥120,000,000, with ¥24,000,000 going to the winner.

== Overview ==
The tournament was originally planned to be held as the "Aiful Cup Golf Tournament" under the special sponsorship of Aiful, a major consumer finance company.

However, Aiful's violations of the Money Lending Business Control and Regulation Law, including aggressive sales activities, severe collections, and illegal interest rates, were discovered and became a social problem. The 2006 tournament was held under the same name as the original agreement (120 million yen prize money, 24 million yen prize money for the winner, etc.). However, the tournament was abandoned after 2007 due to "various circumstances surrounding the consumer finance industry" (for the same reason, the "ACOM International" and the "LPGA Takefuji Classic" were also abandoned).

The Shizuoka Country Hamaoka Course, the venue of the tournament, used to be the site of the "DAIDOH DRINKO Shizuoka Open" (sponsored by Shizuoka Shimbun and Shizuoka Broadcasting) held every year in late March.

== Tournament hosts ==
Years	Venue	Location
2006	Shizuoka Country Hamaoka Course & Hotel	Omaezaki, Shizuoka
2004–2005	Daisen Ark Country Club	Hōki, Tottori
2002–2003	Golf Club Twin Fields (Gold Course)	Komatsu, Ishikawa
1999–2002	Ajigasawa Kogen Golf Course	Ajigasawa, Aomori
1998	Aomori Country Club	Aomori, Aomori

== Winners ==
Year	Winner	Score	To par	Margin of victory	Runner(s)-up
The Golf Tournament in Omaezaki
2006	(Japan) Toru Taniguchi	273	−11	Playoff	(Japan) Tomohiro Kondo (South Korea) Hur Suk-ho
Aiful Cup
2005	(Japan) Tatsuhiko Takahashi	268	−16	1 stroke	(Japan) Yasuaki Takashima
2004	(Japan) Takuya Taniguchi	270	−14	2 strokes	(Japan) Katsumasa Miyamoto
2003	(Japan) Taichi Teshima	269	−19	Playoff	(Japan) Katsumasa Miyamoto
2002	(Japan) Yasuharu Imano	268	−20	1 stroke	(Japan) Toshimitsu Izawa
2001	(Taiwan) Lin Keng-chi	270	−18	Playoff	(Japan) Toru Suzuki
2000	(United States) Dean Wilson	271	−17	1 stroke	(Japan) Eiji Mizoguchi
1999	(Japan) Toshimitsu Izawa	274	−14	1 stroke	(Japan) Toru Taniguchi
1998	(Japan) Hidemichi Tanaka	273	−15	1 stroke	(Japan) Toshimitsu Izawa (Japan) Tatsuo Takasaki
