= Chris Campbell (golfer) =

Australian professional golfer (born 1975)

Personal information
- Nationality: Australia
- Born: 20 November 1975 (age 50)
- Height: 1.83 m (6 ft 0 in)
- Weight: 80 kg (180 lb; 13 st)

Career
- Sport: Golf
- Turned professional: 2003
- Current tour: Japan Golf Tour
- Former tour: PGA Tour China
- Professional wins: 3

Number of wins by tour
- Japan Golf Tour: 1
- Other: 2

Best results in major championships
- Masters Tournament: DNP
- PGA Championship: DNP
- U.S. Open: DNP
- The Open Championship: CUT: 2005

Achievements and awards
- Japan Challenge Tour money list winner: 2009

Chris Campbell (born 20 November 1975) is an Australian professional golfer.

== Professional career ==
Campbell played mainly on the Japan Golf Tour, where he won once. He also played on the PGA Tour China in 2014.

== Personal life ==
Campbell's sister, Nikki, plays on the LPGA of Japan Tour and the ALPG Tour.

== Amateur wins ==
- 1999 New South Wales Amateur
- 2002 Lake Macquarie Amateur

== Professional wins (3) ==
=== Japan Golf Tour wins (1) ===
No.	Date	Tournament	Winning score	Margin of victory	Runners-up
1	26 Jun 2005	Gateway to The Open Mizuno Open	−10 (68-68-71-71=278)	Playoff	(New Zealand) David Smail, (Japan) Tadahiro Takayama

Japan Golf Tour playoff record (1–0)

No.	Year	Tournament	Opponents	Result
1	2005	Gateway to The Open Mizuno Open	(New Zealand) David Smail, (Japan) Tadahiro Takayama	Won with birdie on second extra hole

=== Japan Challenge Tour wins (2) ===
No.	Date	Tournament	Winning score	Margin of victory	Runner(s)-up
1	22 May 2009	Sashima JGTO Challenge I	−2 (69-73=142)	1 stroke	(Japan) Yoshikazu Haku, (Japan) Kodai Ichihara
2	20 Jun 2009	Shizu Hills Tommy Cup	−5 (71-70-64=205)	Playoff	(South Korea) Lee Seong-ho

== Results in major championships ==
Tournament	2005
The Open Championship	CUT

CUT = missed the halfway cut
Note: Campbell only played in The Open Championship.

== Team appearances ==
Amateur

- Australian Men's Interstate Teams Matches (representing New South Wales): 1999, 2000, 2001, 2002 (winners)
