= David Smail (golfer) =

New Zealand golfer

Personal information
- Nationality: New Zealand
- Born: 20 May 1970 (age 56) Hamilton, New Zealand
- Height: 1.95 m (6 ft 5 in)
- Weight: 80 kg (176 lb; 12 st 8 lb)

Career
- Sport: Golf
- Turned professional: 1992
- Current tours: PGA Tour of Australasia; Japan PGA Senior Tour
- Former tour: Japan Golf Tour
- Professional wins: 8
- Highest ranking: 70 (23 February 2003)

Number of wins by tour
- Japan Golf Tour: 5
- PGA Tour of Australasia: 2
- Other: 1

Best results in major championships
- Masters Tournament: DNP
- PGA Championship: T67: 2009
- U.S. Open: CUT: 2003, 2009
- The Open Championship: T67: 2005

David Smail (born 20 May 1970) is a New Zealand professional golfer.

== Career ==
He was born in and resides in Hamilton, New Zealand. He won the New Zealand Open in 2001. He has won five titles on the Japan Golf Tour and has featured in the top 100 of the Official World Golf Rankings.

== Professional wins (8) ==
=== Japan Golf Tour wins (5) ===
Legend
Flagship events (1)
Japan majors (1) (Note: The 2002 Japan Open Golf Championship was also a Japan major championship.)
Other Japan Golf Tour (4)

| No. | Date | Tournament | Winning score | Margin of victory | Runner-up |
|---|---|---|---|---|---|
| 1 | 20 Oct 2002 | Japan Open Golf Championship | −9 (71-66-67-67=271) | 4 strokes | (South Korea) Kim Jong-duck |
| 2 | 1 Dec 2002 | Casio World Open | −16 (68-68-64=200) (Note: Shortened to 54 holes due to weather.) | 2 strokes | (Australia) Brendan Jones |
| 3 | 28 Nov 2004 | Casio World Open (2) | −12 (70-66-69-71=276) | 1 stroke | (United States) Hunter Mahan |
| 4 | 25 Sep 2005 | Acom International | −13 (64-65-69-73=271) | 2 strokes | (Japan) Taichi Teshima |
| 5 | 23 Oct 2005 | Bridgestone Open | −16 (66-72-67-67=272) | 2 strokes | (Japan) Toru Suzuki |

Japan Golf Tour playoff record (0–2)

| No. | Year | Tournament | Opponents | Result |
|---|---|---|---|---|
| 1 | 2005 | Gateway to The Open Mizuno Open | (Australia) Chris Campbell, (Japan) Tadahiro Takayama | Campbell won with birdie on second extra hole |
| 2 | 2005 | Japan Golf Tour Championship Shishido Hills Cup | (Japan) Yasuharu Imano, (Japan) Kazuhiko Hosokawa | Hosokawa won with par on second extra hole |

=== PGA Tour of Australasia wins (2) ===
| No. | Date | Tournament | Winning score | Margin of victory | Runner(s)-up |
|---|---|---|---|---|---|
| 1 | 21 Jan 2001 | New Zealand Open | −7 (66-68-69-70=273) | 2 strokes | (New Zealand) Steven Alker, (New Zealand) Michael Campbell, (England) Roger Chapman, (Australia) Nathan Gatehouse |
| 2 | 28 Jan 2001 | Canon Challenge | −19 (69-64-69-67=269) | 1 stroke | (United States) David Gossett |

=== Japan PGA Senior Tour wins (1) ===
| No. | Date | Tournament | Winning score | Margin of victory | Runners-up |
|---|---|---|---|---|---|
| 1 | 18 Jun 2023 | Starts Senior Golf Tournament | −18 (65-64-66=195) | 5 strokes | (Japan) Hiroyuki Fujita, (Thailand) Prayad Marksaeng |

== Playoff record ==
Other playoff record (0–1)

| No. | Year | Tournament | Opponents | Result |
|---|---|---|---|---|
| 1 | 2001 | WGC-World Cup (with (New Zealand) Michael Campbell) | Denmark − Thomas Bjørn and Søren Hansen, South Africa − Retief Goosen and Ernie Els, United States − David Duval and Tiger Woods | South Africa won with par on second extra hole New Zealand and United States eliminated by birdie on first hole |

== Results in major championships ==
| Tournament | 2001 | 2002 | 2003 | 2004 | 2005 | 2006 | 2007 | 2008 | 2009 |
|---|---|---|---|---|---|---|---|---|---|
| Masters Tournament | | | | | | | | | |
| U.S. Open | | | CUT | | | | | | CUT |
| The Open Championship | 68 | | CUT | | T67 | CUT | | CUT | CUT |
| PGA Championship | | | | | | | | | T67 |

Did not play

CUT = missed the half-way cut
"T" = tied

== Team appearances ==
- World Cup (representing New Zealand): 2001, 2003, 2004, 2008, 2009
