= Tadahiro Takayama =

Japanese professional golfer (born 1978)

Tadahiro Takayama 高山 忠洋
Personal information
- Nationality: Japan
- Born: 12 February 1978 (age 48) Wakayama Prefecture, Japan
- Height: 1.76 m (5 ft 9 in)
- Weight: 75 kg (165 lb; 11.8 st)

Career
- Sport: Golf
- Turned professional: 1999
- Former tour: Japan Golf Tour
- Professional wins: 7

Number of wins by tour
- Japan Golf Tour: 5
- Asian Tour: 1
- Other: 2

Best results in major championships
- Masters Tournament: DNP
- PGA Championship: DNP
- U.S. Open: CUT: 2006, 2012
- The Open Championship: T23: 2005

Tadahiro Takayama (高山 忠洋, Takayama Tadahiro; born 12 February 1978) is a Japanese professional golfer.

== Career ==
Takayama was born in Wakayama. He took up golf at eighteen, an unusually advanced age for a future professional, and turned pro three years later. He made his mark by winning the 2001 PGA Rookie Pro Tournament and has since won five times on the Japan Golf Tour.

== Professional wins (7) ==
=== Japan Golf Tour wins (5) ===
No.	Date	Tournament	Winning score	Margin of victory	Runner-up
1	27 Mar 2005	Token Homemate Cup	−8 (67-72-66=205) (Note: Shortened to 54 holes due to weather.)	Playoff	(Japan) Nozomi Kawahara
2	18 Dec 2005 (2006 season)	Asia Japan Okinawa Open^{1}	−8 (70-68-68-70=276)	Playoff	(Japan) Kiyoshi Miyazato
3	1 Aug 2010	Sun Chlorella Classic	−17 (66-71-64-70=271)	3 strokes	(Fiji) Dinesh Chand
4	17 Apr 2011	Token Homemate Cup (2)	−8 (70-68-68-70=276)	2 strokes	(Japan) Shingo Katayama
5	27 Nov 2011	Casio World Open	−15 (67-68-70-68=273)	2 strokes	(Japan) Yūsaku Miyazato

^{1}Co-sanctioned by the Asian Tour

Japan Golf Tour playoff record (2–1)

No.	Year	Tournament	Opponent(s)	Result
1	2005	Token Homemate Cup	(Japan) Nozomi Kawahara	Won with birdie on third extra hole
2	2005	Gateway to The Open Mizuno Open	(Australia) Chris Campbell, (New Zealand) David Smail	Campbell won with birdie on second extra hole
3	2005	Asia Japan Okinawa Open	(Japan) Kiyoshi Miyazato	Won with birdie on second extra hole

=== Other wins (2) ===
- 2001 PGA Rookie Pro Tournament (Japan)
- 2002 Sankei Sports Kinki Open (Japan)

== Results in major championships ==
Tournament	2005	2006	2007	2008	2009	2010	2011	2012	2013	2014	2015
Masters Tournament											
U.S. Open		CUT						CUT			
The Open Championship	T23						CUT	CUT			CUT
PGA Championship											

Did not play

CUT = missed the half-way cut
"T" indicates a tie for a place

== Results in World Golf Championships ==
Tournament	2012
Match Play	
Championship	T60
Invitational	
Champions	T34

Did not play

"T" = Tied
