= Michael Groom =

Michael Groom may refer to:

- Michael Groom (footballer), association football player who represented New Zealand
- Michael Groom (climber) (born 1959), Australian mountain climber
