= 2004 Japan Golf Tour =

Golf tour season

2004 Japan Golf Tour season
- Duration: 18 December 2003 – 5 December 2004
- Number of official events: 29
- Most wins: (South Korea) Hur Suk-ho (2) (Australia) Brendan Jones (2) (Japan) Shingo Katayama (2) (Australia) Paul Sheehan (2) (Japan) Toru Taniguchi (2) (South Korea) Yang Yong-eun (2)
- Money list: (Japan) Shingo Katayama
- Most Valuable Player: (Japan) Toru Taniguchi
- Rookie of the Year: (Japan) Takuya Taniguchi

The 2004 Japan Golf Tour was the 32nd season of the Japan Golf Tour (formerly the PGA of Japan Tour), the main professional golf tour in Japan since it was formed in 1973.

== Schedule ==
The following table lists official events during the 2004 season.

Date	Tournament	Location	Purse (¥)	Winner (Note: The number in brackets after each winner's name is the number of Japan Golf Tour events they had won up to and including that tournament. This information is only shown for Japan Golf Tour members.)	OWGR points	Other tours (Note: ASA − Asian Tour.)	Notes
21 Dec	Asia Japan Okinawa Open	Okinawa	100,000,000	(Japan) Hideto Tanihara (2)	12	ASA	
28 Mar	Token Homemate Cup	Mie	100,000,000	(Japan) Hiroyuki Fujita (4)	16		
25 Apr	Tsuruya Open	Hyōgo	100,000,000	(Australia) Brendan Jones (3)	16		
2 May	The Crowns	Aichi	120,000,000	(Japan) Shingo Katayama (15)	16		
9 May	Fujisankei Classic	Shizuoka	110,000,000	(Australia) Paul Sheehan (1)	16		
16 May	Japan PGA Championship	Kōchi	110,000,000	(South Korea) Hur Suk-ho (2)	16		Japan major
23 May	Munsingwear Open KSB Cup	Okayama	100,000,000	(Japan) Tatsuya Mitsuhashi (1)	16		
30 May	Mitsubishi Diamond Cup Golf	Ibaraki	110,000,000	(Japan) Tetsuji Hiratsuka (2)	16		
6 Jun	JCB Classic Sendai	Miyagi	100,000,000	(Japan) Takashi Kamiyama (1)	16		
20 Jun	Mandom Lucido Yomiuri Open	Hyōgo	100,000,000	(Fiji) Dinesh Chand (3)	16		
27 Jun	Gateway to The Open Mizuno Open	Okayama	100,000,000	(Australia) Brendan Jones (4)	16		
4 Jul	Japan Golf Tour Championship Shishido Hills Cup	Ibaraki	120,000,000	(South Korea) Hur Suk-ho (3)	16		Japan major
11 Jul	Woodone Open Hiroshima	Hiroshima	100,000,000	(Japan) Shingo Katayama (16)	16		
25 Jul	Sato Foods NST Niigata Open	Niigata	50,000,000	(South Korea) Kim Jong-duck (4)	16		
1 Aug	Aiful Cup	Tottori	120,000,000	(Japan) Takuya Taniguchi (1)	16		
8 Aug	Sun Chlorella Classic	Hokkaidō	150,000,000	(South Korea) Yang Yong-eun (1)	16		
29 Aug	Hisamitsu-KBC Augusta	Fukuoka	100,000,000	(Australia) Steven Conran (1)	16		
12 Sep	Suntory Open	Chiba	100,000,000	(Japan) Hideki Kase (4)	16		
19 Sep	ANA Open	Hokkaidō	100,000,000	(Thailand) Chawalit Plaphol (1)	16		
3 Oct	Acom International	Ibaraki	120,000,000	(Japan) Toru Suzuki (7)	16		
10 Oct	Coca-Cola Tokai Classic	Aichi	120,000,000	(Japan) Katsumune Imai (2)	16		
17 Oct	Japan Open Golf Championship	Ishikawa	120,000,000	(Japan) Toru Taniguchi (8)	32		Flagship event (Note: Also a Japan major championship.)
24 Oct	Bridgestone Open	Chiba	110,000,000	(Japan) Toru Taniguchi (9)	16		
31 Oct	ABC Championship	Hyōgo	120,000,000	(Japan) Makoto Inoue (1)	16		
7 Nov	Asahi-Ryokuken Yomiuri Memorial	Fukuoka	100,000,000	(South Korea) Yang Yong-eun (2)	16		New tournament
14 Nov	Mitsui Sumitomo Visa Taiheiyo Masters	Shizuoka	150,000,000	(Northern Ireland) Darren Clarke (n/a)	18		
21 Nov	Dunlop Phoenix Tournament	Miyazaki	200,000,000	(United States) Tiger Woods (n/a)	40		
28 Nov	Casio World Open	Kagoshima	140,000,000	(New Zealand) David Smail (3)	16		
5 Dec	Golf Nippon Series JT Cup	Tokyo	100,000,000	(Australia) Paul Sheehan (2)	16		Japan major

=== Unofficial events ===
The following events were sanctioned by the Japan Golf Tour, but did not carry official money, nor were wins official.

Date	Tournament	Location	Purse	Winner	OWGR points	Other tours	Notes
11 Apr	Masters Tournament	United States	US$6,000,000	(United States) Phil Mickelson	100		Major championship
20 Jun	U.S. Open	United States	US$6,250,000	(South Africa) Retief Goosen	100		Major championship
18 Jul	The Open Championship	Scotland	£4,000,000	(United States) Todd Hamilton	100		Major championship
15 Aug	PGA Championship	United States	US$6,250,000	(Fiji) Vijay Singh	100		Major championship

== Money list ==
The money list was based on prize money won during the season, calculated in Japanese yen.

Position	Player	Prize money (¥)
1	(Japan) Shingo Katayama	119,512,374
2	(Japan) Toru Taniguchi	101,773,301
3	(South Korea) Yang Yong-eun	99,540,333
4	(South Korea) Hur Suk-ho	90,176,104
5	(Australia) Paul Sheehan	85,020,125

== Awards ==
Award	Winner	Ref.
Most Valuable Player	(Japan) Toru Taniguchi	
Rookie of the Year (Shimada Trophy)	(Japan) Takuya Taniguchi	

== Japan Challenge Tour ==
2004 Japan Challenge Tour season
- Duration: 15 April 2004 – 21 October 2004
- Number of official events: 10
- Money list: (Japan) Yoshiaki Kimura

The 2004 Japan Challenge Tour was the 20th season of the Japan Challenge Tour, the official development tour to the Japan Golf Tour.

=== Schedule ===
The following table lists official events during the 2004 season.

Date	Tournament	Location	Purse (¥)	Winner (Note: The number in brackets after each winner's name is the number of Japan Challenge Tour events they had won up to and including that tournament. It is rare for someone to accumulate many wins on the Japan Challenge Tour as success at this level usually leads to promotion to the Japan Golf Tour.)
16 Apr	PRGR Cup (Kanto)	Ibaraki	10,000,000	(Japan) Isao Narukawa (1)
25 Jun	PGA Cup Challenge Tournament	Ibaraki	10,000,000	(Japan) Mitsuo Harada (1)
9 Jul	1st PGM Series Wakagi Challenge	Saga	10,000,000	(Japan) Yutaka Horinouchi (1)
30 Jul	2nd PGM Series Lions Challenge	Hyōgo	10,000,000	(Japan) Toshihiro Aizawa (1)
6 Aug	3rd PGM Series Segovia Challenge	Ibaraki	10,000,000	(Japan) Toshio Ozaki (1)
27 Aug	4th PGM Series Matsushima Chisan Challenge	Ibaraki	10,000,000	(Japan) Taichiro Kiyota (1)
10 Sep	4th PGM Series Ohinata Challenge	Tochigi	10,000,000	(Japan) Takeshi Kajikawa (1)
2 Oct	Kanitop Cup Challenge Tournament	Miyagi	20,000,000	(Japan) Yoshiaki Kimura (1)
8 Oct	PRGR Cup (Kansai)	Hyōgo	10,000,000	(Japan) Masanori Ushiyama (1)
21 Oct	Tokyo Dome Cup	Tochigi	10,000,000	(Japan) Gohei Sato (5)

=== Money list ===
The money list was based on prize money won during the season, calculated in Japanese yen. The top five players on the money list earned status to play on the 2005 Japan Golf Tour.

Position	Player	Prize money (¥)
1	(Japan) Yoshiaki Kimura	4,199,650
2	(Japan) Mitsuo Harada	3,596,022
3	(Japan) Yutaka Horinouchi	2,789,508
4	(Japan) Toshihiro Aizawa	2,767,949
5	(Japan) Taichiro Kiyota	2,635,826
