= Shoichi Kuwabara =

Japanese professional golfer

Personal information
- Nationality: Japan
- Born: 21 January 1969 (age 57) Ehime Prefecture, Japan
- Height: 1.76 m (5 ft 9 in)
- Weight: 80 kg (180 lb; 13 st)

Career
- Sport: Golf
- Status: Professional
- Former tour: Japan Golf Tour
- Professional wins: 1

Number of wins by tour
- Japan Golf Tour: 1

Shoichi Kuwabara (桑原 将一, Kuwabara Shoichi; born 21 January 1969) is a Japanese professional golfer.

== Career ==
Kuwabara played on the Japan Golf Tour, winning once.

== Professional wins (1) ==
=== PGA of Japan Tour wins (1) ===
No.	Date	Tournament	Winning score	Margin of victory	Runners-up
1	10 Aug 1997	Sanko Grand Summer Championship	−17 (70-71-64-66=271)	1 stroke	(Japan) Masashi Shimada, (Japan) Taichi Teshima
