= Jerry Groom =

American football player (1929–2008)

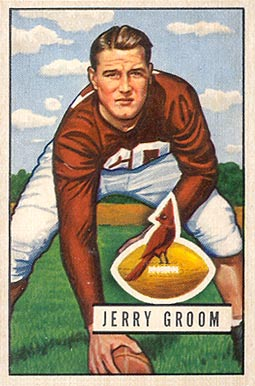
- Groom on a 1951 Bowman football card

No. 57
- Positions: Guard, center, defensive tackle, linebacker

Personal information
- Born: August 15, 1929; Des Moines, Iowa, U.S.
- Died: February 29, 2008 (aged 78); Sarasota, Florida, U.S.
- Listed height: 6 ft 3 in (1.91 m)
- Listed weight: 236 lb (107 kg)

Career information
- High school: Dowling Catholic (West Des Moines, Iowa)
- College: Notre Dame
- NFL draft: 1951: 1st round, 6th overall pick

Career history
- Chicago Cardinals (1951–1955)

Awards and highlights
- Pro Bowl (1954); Consensus All-American (1950)

Career NFL statistics
- Games played: 58
- Games started: 50
- Fumble recoveries: 3
- Stats at Pro Football Reference
- College Football Hall of Fame

Jerome Paul "Boomer" Groom (August 15, 1929 – February 29, 2008) was an American professional football player. Born in Des Moines, Iowa, he graduated from Dowling Catholic High School in Des Moines. He played college football for the Notre Dame Fighting Irish football team and was a consensus selection at the center position on the 1950 College Football All-America Team. He then played professional football in the National Football League (NFL) for the Chicago Cardinals from 1951 to 1955. He was chosen to play in the 1954 Pro Bowl.

Groom later served as a color commentator for the Denver Broncos' radio broadcasts in their inaugural American Football League (AFL) season in 1960. In 1994, he was inducted into the College Football Hall of Fame. He died in 2008 at age 78 in Sarasota, Florida.

== See also ==
- List of people with surname Groom
