= Arthur Groom =

Arthur Groom may refer to:

- Arthur Groom (politician) (1852–1922), Australian politician and land agent
- Arthur Groom (writer) (1904–1953), Australian writer, conservationist, journalist and photographer
- Arthur Hesketh Groom (1846–1918), founded the Kobe Golf Club, 1903
