= PGA Philanthropy Tournament =

Tournament information
- Location: Nara, Nara, Japan
- Established: 1991
- Course: Nara Wakakusa Country Club
- Par: 71
- Length: 6,635 yards (6,067 m)
- Tour: Japan Golf Tour
- Format: Stroke play
- Prize fund: ¥50,000,000
- Month played: June
- Final year: 2000

Tournament record score
- Aggregate: 264 Shigeki Maruyama (1998)
- To par: −20 as above

Final champion
- (Japan) Masashi Shimada
- Location in Japan Location in the Nara Prefecture

The PGA Philanthropy Tournament was a professional golf tournament that was held in Japan from 1991 to 2000. It was an event on the Japan Golf Tour and played at several different courses throughout Japan.

== Winners ==
Year	Winner	Score	To par	Margin of victory	Runner(s)-up	Venue
2000	(Japan) Masashi Shimada	201 (Note: Shortened to 54 holes due to weather.)	−12	Playoff	(Japan) Tatsuya Mitsuhashi (Japan) Tatsuhiko Takahashi	Nara Wakakusa
1999: No tournament
1998	(Japan) Shigeki Maruyama	264	−20	1 stroke	(Japan) Satoshi Higashi	Shiromizu
1997	(Japan) Naomichi Ozaki	267	−17	9 strokes	(Japan) Eiji Mizoguchi (Japan) Tsuyoshi Yoneyama	Maple Point
1996	(United States) Todd Hamilton (2)	275	−13	2 strokes	(Japan) Kazuhiro Takami	Oakmont
1995	(Japan) Kazuhiro Takami	277	−11	Playoff	(Japan) Katsunari Takahashi (United States) Brian Watts	Twin Fields
1994	(United States) Todd Hamilton	278	−10	Playoff	(Japan) Eiji Mizoguchi	Golden Valley
1993	(Australia) Roger Mackay	278	−10	1 stroke	(United States) Brian Watts	Ahlex
1992	(Japan) Masashi Ozaki	270	−14	3 stroke	(Japan) Saburo Fujiki	Caledonian
1991	(Japan) Harumitsu Hamano	273	−15	4 strokes	(Japan) Masashi Ozaki	Glenmoor
