= Nobuhito Sato =

Japanese professional golfer (born 1970)

Personal information
- Nationality: Japan
- Born: 12 March 1970 (age 56) Chiba Prefecture, Japan
- Height: 1.79 m (5 ft 10 in)
- Weight: 75 kg (165 lb; 11.8 st)

Career
- Sport: Golf
- College: University of Nevada, Reno
- Turned professional: 1993
- Former tours: Japan Golf Tour; European Tour
- Professional wins: 11
- Highest ranking: 76 (22 October 2000)

Number of wins by tour
- Japan Golf Tour: 9
- Other: 2

Best results in major championships
- Masters Tournament: DNP
- PGA Championship: DNP
- U.S. Open: DNP
- The Open Championship: CUT: 1997, 2000, 2001, 2003

Nobuhito Sato (佐藤 信人, Satō Nobuhito; born 12 March 1970) is a Japanese professional golfer.

== Golf career ==
Sato was born in Chiba Prefecture. He turned professional in 1993.

Sato has won nine tournaments on the Japan Golf Tour and featured in the top 100 of the Official World Golf Ranking. His most successful years came in 2000 when he won four times and in 2002 when he finished second on the Japan Golf Tour money list. He also has two wins on the Japan Challenge Tour, both in 1996.

== Professional wins (11) ==
=== Japan Golf Tour wins (9) ===
Legend
Japan majors (2)
Other Japan Golf Tour (7)

No.	Date	Tournament	Winning score	Margin of victory	Runner(s)-up
1	8 Jun 1997	JCB Classic Sendai	−17 (68-65-64-70=267)	4 strokes	(Japan) Toshimitsu Izawa, (Japan) Naomichi Ozaki
2	25 Oct 1998	Bridgestone Open	−13 (69-69-67-70=275)	Playoff	(Japan) Tateo Ozaki
3	14 May 2000	Japan PGA Championship	−4 (68-71-69-72=280)	1 stroke	(Japan) Shigemasa Higaki, (Japan) Satoshi Higashi
4	4 Jun 2000	JCB Classic Sendai (2)	−13 (68-65-67-71=271)	3 strokes	(Japan) Toshimitsu Izawa
5	17 Sep 2000	ANA Open	−6 (68-68-72-74=282)	1 stroke	(United States) Christian Peña
6	22 Oct 2000	Bridgestone Open	−16 (70-66-69-67=272)	1 stroke	(Japan) Katsumasa Miyamoto
7	12 May 2002	Fujisankei Classic	−8 (67-70-68-71=276)	Playoff	(Australia) Scott Laycock
8	7 Jul 2002	Japan Golf Tour Championship iiyama Cup	−20 (67-66-71-64=268)	6 strokes	(Japan) Kenichi Kuboya
9	8 Sep 2002	Japan PGA Match-Play Championship Promise Cup	5 and 4		(Japan) Tomohiro Kondo

Japan Golf Tour playoff record (2–0)

No.	Year	Tournament	Opponent	Result
1	1998	Bridgestone Open	(Japan) Tateo Ozaki	Won with birdie on first extra hole
2	2002	Fujisankei Classic	(Australia) Scott Laycock	Won with par on second extra hole

=== Japan Challenge Tour wins (2) ===
- 1996 Kabaya Ohayo Cup, Matsugamine Open

== Results in major championships ==
Tournament	1997	1998	1999	2000	2001	2002	2003
The Open Championship	CUT			CUT	CUT		CUT

Did not play

CUT = missed the half-way cut
Note: Sato only played in The Open Championship.

== Results in World Golf Championships ==
Tournament	2000	2001	2002
Match Play		R64	
Championship	T25	NT^{1}	
Invitational			T65

^{1}Cancelled due to 9/11

Did not play

QF, R16, R32, R64 = Round in which player lost in match play
"T" = Tied
NT = No tournament

== Team appearances ==
- Dunhill Cup (representing Japan): 1997
- Dynasty Cup (representing Japan): 2003
