= Kiyoshi Miyazato =

Japanese professional golfer

Personal information
- Nationality: Japan
- Born: 28 February 1977 (age 49) Okinawa Prefecture, Japan
- Height: 1.66 m (5 ft 5 in)
- Weight: 82 kg (181 lb; 12.9 st)

Career
- Sport: Golf
- Turned professional: 2000
- Current tour: Japan Golf Tour
- Professional wins: 2

Number of wins by tour
- Japan Golf Tour: 1
- Asian Tour: 1
- Other: 1

Best results in major championships
- Masters Tournament: DNP
- PGA Championship: DNP
- U.S. Open: CUT: 2014
- The Open Championship: CUT: 2002

Kiyoshi Miyazato (born 28 February 1977) is a Japanese professional golfer.

== Career ==
Miyazato plays on the Japan Golf Tour, where he has won once.

His sister, Ai Miyazato, and brother, Yūsaku Miyazato, are also professional golfers.

== Professional wins (2) ==
=== Japan Golf Tour wins (1) ===
No.	Date	Tournament	Winning score	Margin of victory	Runners-up
1	19 Dec 2004 (2005 season)	Asia Japan Okinawa Open^{1}	−14 (68-70-68-64=270)	1 stroke	(Australia) Scott Barr, (Japan) Hideki Kase, (Japan) Masahiro Kuramoto, (Japan) Mamo Osanai, (India) Jeev Milkha Singh, (South Korea) Charlie Wi

^{1}Co-sanctioned by the Asian Tour

Japan Golf Tour playoff record (0–1)

No.	Year	Tournament	Opponent	Result
1	2005	Asia Japan Okinawa Open	(Japan) Tadahiro Takayama	Lost to birdie on second extra hole

=== Japan Challenge Tour wins (1) ===
No.	Date	Tournament	Winning score	Margin of victory	Runners-up
1	25 Jul 2014	Heiwa PGM Challenge II Road to Championship	−14 (68-70-68-64=270)	3 strokes	(Japan) Kodai Ichihara, (Japan) Shota Kishimoto
