= 2005 Japan Golf Tour =

Golf tour season

2005 Japan Golf Tour season
- Duration: 16 December 2004 – 4 December 2005
- Number of official events: 29
- Most wins: (Japan) Keiichiro Fukabori (2) (South Korea) Hur Suk-ho (2) (Japan) Yasuharu Imano (2) (Japan) Shingo Katayama (2) (Japan) Naomichi Ozaki (2) (New Zealand) David Smail (2)
- Money list: (Japan) Shingo Katayama
- Most Valuable Player: (Japan) Shingo Katayama
- Rookie of the Year: (South Korea) Jang Ik-jae

The 2005 Japan Golf Tour was the 33rd season of the Japan Golf Tour (formerly the PGA of Japan Tour), the main professional golf tour in Japan since it was formed in 1973.

== Schedule ==
The following table lists official events during the 2005 season.

Date	Tournament	Location	Purse (¥)	Winner (Note: The number in brackets after each winner's name is the number of Japan Golf Tour events they had won up to and including that tournament. This information is only shown for Japan Golf Tour members.)	OWGR points	Other tours (Note: ASA − Asian Tour.)	Notes
19 Dec	Asia Japan Okinawa Open	Okinawa	100,000,000	(Japan) Kiyoshi Miyazato (1)	12	ASA	
27 Mar	Token Homemate Cup	Mie	100,000,000	(Japan) Tadahiro Takayama (1)	16		
24 Apr	Tsuruya Open	Hyōgo	100,000,000	(Japan) Naomichi Ozaki (31)	16		
1 May	The Crowns	Aichi	120,000,000	(Japan) Naomichi Ozaki (32)	16		
15 May	Japan PGA Championship	Kumamoto	110,000,000	(South Korea) Hur Suk-ho (4)	16		Japan major
22 May	Munsingwear Open KSB Cup	Okayama	100,000,000	(Japan) Hiroyuki Fujita (5)	16		
29 May	Mitsubishi Diamond Cup Golf	Hyōgo	110,000,000	(South Korea) Jang Ik-jae (1)	16		
5 Jun	JCB Classic Sendai	Miyagi	100,000,000	(South Korea) Hur Suk-ho (5)	16		
19 Jun	Mandom Lucido Yomiuri Open	Hyōgo	100,000,000	(Japan) Satoru Hirota (1)	16		
26 Jun	Gateway to The Open Mizuno Open	Okayama	100,000,000	(Australia) Chris Campbell (1)	16		
3 Jul	Japan Golf Tour Championship Shishido Hills Cup	Ibaraki	120,000,000	(Japan) Kazuhiko Hosokawa (8)	16		Japan major
10 Jul	Woodone Open Hiroshima	Hiroshima	100,000,000	(Japan) Takao Nogami (1)	16		
24 Jul	Sega Sammy Cup	Hokkaidō	120,000,000	(Taiwan) Lin Keng-chi (3)	16		New tournament
31 Jul	Aiful Cup	Tottori	120,000,000	(Japan) Tatsuhiko Takahashi (1)	16		
7 Aug	Sun Chlorella Classic	Hokkaidō	150,000,000	(Japan) Keiichiro Fukabori (7)	16		
28 Aug	Under Armour KBC Augusta	Fukuoka	100,000,000	(Japan) Toshimitsu Izawa (15)	16		
4 Sep	Fujisankei Classic	Yamanashi	150,000,000	(Japan) Daisuke Maruyama (1)	16		
11 Sep	Suntory Open	Chiba	100,000,000	(Japan) Yasuharu Imano (5)	16		
18 Sep	ANA Open	Hokkaidō	100,000,000	(Japan) Keiichiro Fukabori (8)	16		
25 Sep	Acom International	Ibaraki	120,000,000	(New Zealand) David Smail (4)	16		
9 Oct	Coca-Cola Tokai Classic	Aichi	120,000,000	(South Korea) Yang Yong-eun (3)	16		
16 Oct	Japan Open Golf Championship	Hyōgo	120,000,000	(Japan) Shingo Katayama (17)	32		Flagship event (Note: Also a Japan major championship.)
23 Oct	Bridgestone Open	Chiba	110,000,000	(New Zealand) David Smail (5)	16		
30 Oct	ABC Championship	Hyōgo	120,000,000	(Japan) Shingo Katayama (18)	16		
6 Nov	Asahi-Ryokuken Yomiuri Memorial	Fukuoka	100,000,000	(Japan) Azuma Yano (1)	16		
13 Nov	Mitsui Sumitomo Visa Taiheiyo Masters	Shizuoka	150,000,000	(Northern Ireland) Darren Clarke (n/a)	20		
20 Nov	Dunlop Phoenix Tournament	Miyazaki	200,000,000	(United States) Tiger Woods (n/a)	34		
27 Nov	Casio World Open	Kōchi	140,000,000	(Japan) Toru Taniguchi (10)	16		
4 Dec	Golf Nippon Series JT Cup	Tokyo	100,000,000	(Japan) Yasuharu Imano (6)	16		Japan major

=== Unofficial events ===
The following events were sanctioned by the Japan Golf Tour, but did not carry official money, nor were wins official.

Date	Tournament	Location	Purse	Winner	OWGR points	Other tours	Notes
10 Apr	Masters Tournament	United States	US$7,000,000	(United States) Tiger Woods	100		Major championship
19 Jun	U.S. Open	United States	US$6,250,000	(New Zealand) Michael Campbell	100		Major championship
17 Jul	The Open Championship	Scotland	£4,000,000	(United States) Tiger Woods	100		Major championship
15 Aug	PGA Championship	United States	US$6,500,000	(United States) Phil Mickelson	100		Major championship

== Money list ==
The money list was based on prize money won during the season, calculated in Japanese yen.

Position	Player	Prize money (¥)
1	(Japan) Shingo Katayama	134,075,280
2	(Japan) Yasuharu Imano	118,543,753
3	(Japan) Keiichiro Fukabori	93,595,937
4	(South Korea) Hur Suk-ho	91,548,268
5	(New Zealand) David Smail	78,870,984

== Awards ==
Award	Winner	Ref.
Most Valuable Player	(Japan) Shingo Katayama	
Rookie of the Year (Shimada Trophy)	(South Korea) Jang Ik-jae	

== Japan Challenge Tour ==
2005 Japan Challenge Tour season
- Duration: 14 April 2005 – 20 October 2005
- Number of official events: 13
- Most wins: (Japan) Shoichi Ideguchi (2) (Japan) Takeshi Kajikawa (2) (Japan) Akinori Tani (2)
- Money list: (Japan) Shoichi Ideguchi

The 2005 Japan Challenge Tour was the 21st season of the Japan Challenge Tour, the official development tour to the Japan Golf Tour.

=== Schedule ===
The following table lists official events during the 2005 season.

Date	Tournament	Location	Purse (¥)	Winner (Note: The number in brackets after each winner's name is the number of Japan Challenge Tour events they had won up to and including that tournament. It is rare for someone to accumulate many wins on the Japan Challenge Tour as success at this level usually leads to promotion to the Japan Golf Tour.)
15 Apr	PRGR Cup (Kanto)	Ibaraki	10,000,000	(Japan) Masaya Tomida (1)
3 Jun	PGA JGTO Challenge I	Okayama	10,000,000	(Japan) Tsutomu Higa (1)
17 Jun	Sega Sammy Challenge	Ibaraki	10,000,000	(Japan) Tomonori Takahashi (2)
24 Jun	PGA JGTO Challenge II	Tochigi	10,000,000	(South Korea) C. K. Choi (1)
8 Jul	1st PGM Series World Challenge	Kumamoto	10,000,000	(Japan) Takeshi Kajikawa (2)
22 Jul	2nd PGM Series Kasagi Challenge	Kyoto	10,000,000	(Japan) Shoichi Ideguchi (1)
5 Aug	3rd PGM Series Daitakarazuka Challenge	Hyōgo	10,000,000	(South Korea) Nam Young-woo (1)
26 Aug	4th PGM Series Ami Challenge	Ibaraki	10,000,000	(Japan) Kazuhiro Shimizu (1)
9 Sep	GDO Challenge Cup	Ibaraki	10,000,000	(Japan) Akinori Tani (1)
16 Sep	5th PGM Series Matsushima Chisan Challenge	Miyagi	10,000,000	(Japan) Takeshi Kajikawa (3)
1 Oct	Kanitop Cup Challenge Tournament	Miyagi	20,000,000	(Japan) Taichiro Kiyota (2)
7 Oct	PRGR Cup (Kansai)	Hyōgo	10,000,000	(Japan) Shoichi Ideguchi (2)
20 Oct	Tokyo Dome Cup	Tochigi	10,000,000	(Japan) Akinori Tani (2)

=== Money list ===
The money list was based on prize money won during the season, calculated in Japanese yen. The top five players on the money list earned status to play on the 2006 Japan Golf Tour.

Position	Player	Prize money (¥)
1	(Japan) Shoichi Ideguchi	5,070,263
2	(Japan) Taichiro Kiyota	4,500,000
3	(Japan) Takeshi Kajikawa	4,456,028
4	(Japan) Akinori Tani	4,370,189
5	(Japan) Kazuhiro Shimizu	3,381,377
