= Katsumune Imai =

Japanese golfer

Personal information
- Nationality: Japan
- Born: 22 April 1972 (age 54) Chiba Prefecture, Japan
- Height: 1.73 m (5 ft 8 in)
- Weight: 70 kg (150 lb; 11 st)

Career
- Sport: Golf
- Status: Professional
- Former tours: Japan Golf Tour; Asian Tour
- Professional wins: 2

Number of wins by tour
- Japan Golf Tour: 2

Katsumune Imai (今井 克宗, Imai Katsumune; born 22 April 1972) is a Japanese professional golfer.

== Career ==
Imai played on the Japan Golf Tour, winning twice.

== Professional wins (2) ==
=== Japan Golf Tour wins (2) ===
No.	Date	Tournament	Winning score	Margin of victory	Runner(s)-up
1	30 Nov 2003	Casio World Open	−24 (65-65-67-67=264)	7 strokes	(Australia) Brendan Jones, (Japan) Shingo Katayama
2	10 Oct 2004	Coca-Cola Tokai Classic	−6 (70-68-72=210) (Note: Shortened to 54 holes due to weather.)	Playoff	(Japan) Kazuhiko Hosokawa

Japan Golf Tour playoff record (1–0)

No.	Year	Tournament	Opponent	Result
1	2004	Coca-Cola Tokai Classic	(Japan) Kazuhiko Hosokawa	Won with par on first extra hole
