= Kobe Golf Club =

Golf course in Nada-ku, Kobe, Japan

Kobe Golf Club 神戸ゴルフ倶楽部
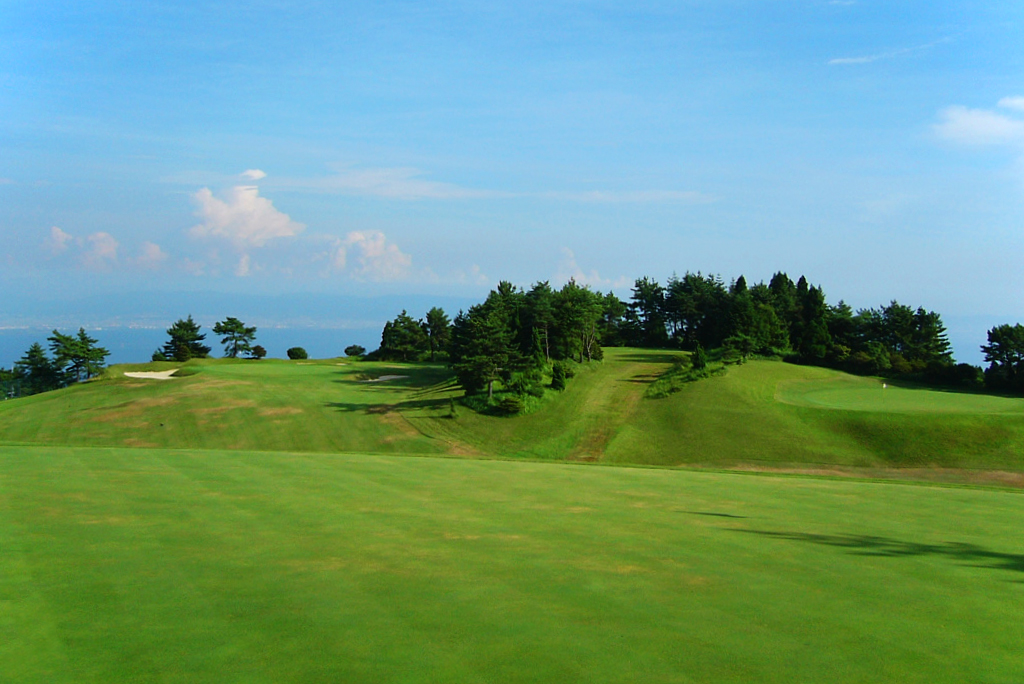
- The Kobe Golf Club overlooks the Inland Sea
- Interactive map of Kobe Golf Club 神戸ゴルフ倶楽部
- 34°45′30″N 135°14′17″E

Club information
- Location: 1-3, Rokkosan-Cho Ichigatani; Nada-ku Kobe, Japan
- Established: 1903
- Type: private
- Owner: Kobe Golf Club
- Operator: Kobe Golf Club
- Total holes: 18
- Website: http://www.kobegc.or.jp/
- Designed by: J.Adamson
- Par: 61
- Length: 4,049 yards (3,702 m)

The Kobe Golf Club (神戸ゴルフ倶楽部, Kōbe Golf Club) is Japan's first golf course, built on Mount Rokko in 1903 by English expatriate Arthur Hasketh Groom. The club began as a nine-hole course on May 24, 1903, but quickly expanded to eighteen the following year.

Strict rules are enforced to maintain the course's pristine condition such as a prohibition of golf carts and a limit of eight clubs per player. As the course was literally carved out of a mountain, it can be quite demanding and clubs are carried in canvas bags to reduce the strain on caddies.

== Scorecard ==
Kobe Golf Club
Tee	Rating/Slope	1	2	3	4	5	6	7	8	9	Out	10	11	12	13	14	15	16	17	18	In	Total
Back		180	176	188	195	202	193	275	216	174	1799	167	190	346	220	176	396	366	131	258	2250	4049
Front		170	173	182	185	202	183	260	206	149	1710	155	180	331	193	176	396	366	121	223	2141	3851
Par		3	3	4	3	3	3	4	4	3	30	3	3	4	3	3	4	4	3	4	31	61
SI		14	18	12	4	10	8	2	6	16		15	11	3	9	13	1	5	17	7

== Gallery ==
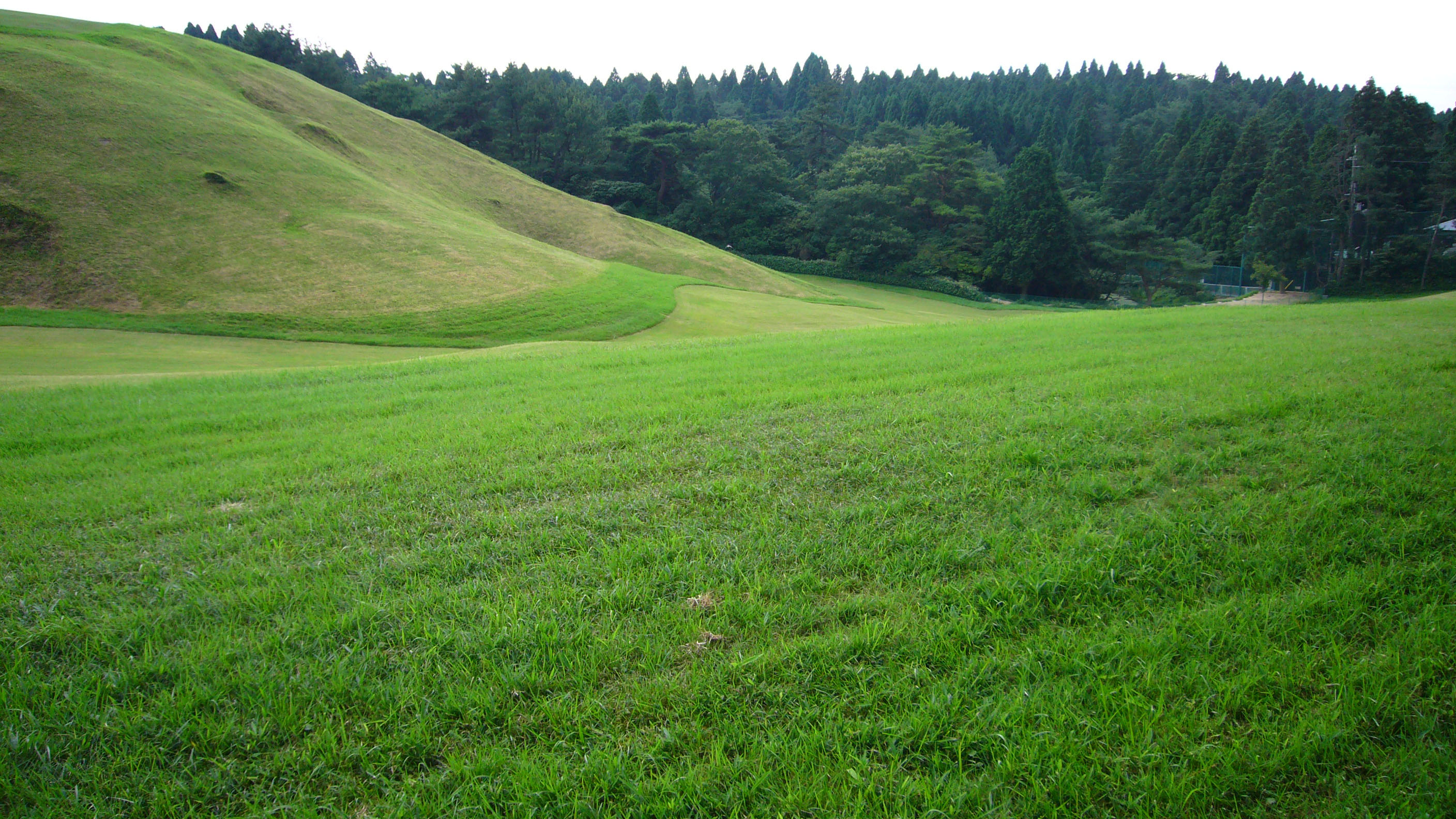
Kobe Golf Club's location on Mount Rokko leads to an exceptionally hilly playing environment.
