= Kazuhiro Takami =

Japanese golfer

Personal information
- Nationality: Japan
- Born: 11 December 1959 (age 66) Hokkaido Prefecture, Japan
- Height: 1.81 m (5 ft 11 in)
- Weight: 85 kg (187 lb; 13.4 st)

Career
- Sport: Golf
- Turned professional: 1985
- Former tour: Japan Golf Tour
- Professional wins: 4

Number of wins by tour
- Japan Golf Tour: 2
- Other: 2

Best results in major championships
- Masters Tournament: DNP
- PGA Championship: DNP
- U.S. Open: DNP
- The Open Championship: CUT: 1995

Kazuhiro Takami (born 11 December 1959) is a Japanese professional golfer.

== Professional career ==
Takami played on the Japan Golf Tour, winning twice.

== Professional wins (4) ==
=== PGA of Japan Tour wins (2) ===
No.	Date	Tournament	Winning score	Margin of victory	Runner(s)-up
1	27 Mar 1994	United KSB Open	−7 (70-71-67-73=281)	6 strokes	(Japan) Yoshinori Kaneko
2	2 Jul 1995	PGA Philanthropy Tournament	−11 (69-71-68-69=277)	Playoff	(Japan) Katsunari Takahashi, (United States) Brian Watts

PGA of Japan Tour playoff record (1–1)

No.	Year	Tournament	Opponents	Result
1	1992	Sapporo Tokyu Open	(Japan) Nobuo Serizawa, (Japan) Nobumitsu Yuhara	Yuhara won with birdie on first extra hole
2	1995	PGA Philanthropy Tournament	(Japan) Katsunari Takahashi, (United States) Brian Watts	Won with birdie on first extra hole

=== Japan PGA Senior Tour wins (2) ===
- 2010 Fancl Classic
- 2012 Fancl Classic

== Results in major championships ==
Tournament	1995
The Open Championship	CUT

CUT = missed the half-way cut
Note: Takami only played in The Open Championship.

== Team appearances ==
- Dunhill Cup (representing Japan): 1996
