= Michael Groom (footballer) =

New Zealand footballer

Mike Groom
Personal information
- Full name: Michael Groom

Senior career*
| Years | Team | Apps | (Gls) |
- Hamilton
- Manurewa

International career
| 1980–1984 | New Zealand | 20 | (5) |
- * Club domestic league appearances and goals

Michael Groom was an association football player who represented New Zealand at international level.

Groom made his full All Whites debut in a 1–1 draw with Fiji on 19 February 1980, and ended his international playing career with 20 A-international caps and 5 goals to his credit, his final cap gained in a 0–1 loss to Bahrain on 24 April 1984. He now teaches full-time at St Paul's Collegiate school in Hamilton. He believes in "The Bounce" philosophy, and has led St Paul's to 7 consecutive national tournaments. However, they have never won any trophies. During his time at St Paul's he has tutored numerous New Zealand football representatives, including Futsal Whites players John Penyas and Elliot Collier, All Whites Marco Rojas, Sarpreet Singh and most notably All Whites and Leicester City and Nottingham Forest striker Chris Wood. His early influences that inspired his methodology were Tony the talking football. Through listening to Tony and his friend Leonard Steve Davies, Michael was inspired to teach youth about the samba and the skill.

== Publications and poetry ==
Groom has published an instructional children’s book Tony and the Talking Football, illustrated by Paul Shipper, with accompanying DVD/CD. The books description says: “Tony has a strong imagination - he loves music, football, imagination, and has a special relationship with his football.”

In 2014, Groom wrote a Foreword to Mark Pirie’s anthology of football poems published as a special World Cup issue of Pirie’s journal broadsheet. Groom helped launch the book at the Brazil Embassy in Wellington, New Zealand, during the World Cup that year, and his son Dylan was a contributor. In 2017, Mark Pirie published a new expanded edition of the book titled Boots through his small press HeadworX Publishers in eBook and print formats.

Groom became interested in poetry writing songs and raps as a homage to the inspiration of Ronaldinho and the Joga bonito ethos: "Ronaldinho, say the name, I know we will win the game, Not the one that’s a statistic But the one about the joy and the music, Because all that matters when the whistle blows Is the joy of Ronaldinho’s.” He has since written a poem for All Whites striker Chris Wood, broadcast on TV One’s Seven Sharp, 27 March 2026.

== Club history ==
- Hamilton (1980)
- Manurewa (1983–1984)

== See also ==
- List of people with surname Groom
