= Toru Suzuki =

Japanese professional golfer

Toru Suzuki 鈴木 亨
Personal information
- Nationality: Japan
- Born: 28 May 1966 (age 60) Gifu Prefecture, Japan
- Height: 1.78 m (5 ft 10 in)
- Weight: 80 kg (176 lb; 12 st 8 lb)
- Spouse: Kyoko Maruya
- Children: 2, including Airi

Career
- Sport: Golf
- Turned professional: 1990
- Current tour: Japan PGA Senior Tour
- Former tours: Japan Golf Tour; Japan Challenge Tour
- Professional wins: 18

Number of wins by tour
- Japan Golf Tour: 8
- Other: 10

Best results in major championships
- Masters Tournament: DNP
- PGA Championship: DNP
- U.S. Open: DNP
- The Open Championship: CUT: 1995, 1998, 2002

Toru Suzuki (鈴木 亨, Suzuki Tōru; born 28 May 1966) is a Japanese professional golfer, currently playing on the Japan Golf Tour.

== Early life ==
In 1966, Suzuki was born in Gifu Prefecture. At the age of 9, Suzuki started playing golf.

== Professional career ==
In 1990, Suzuki turned professional. He won his first title on the Japan Golf Tour in 1993 and would win consistently between then and 2004.

Suzuki qualified for his second major championship in 1998 at The Open Championship after a win in Japan at the Sapporo Tokyu Open. He missed the cut. He also played in the 2002 Open Championship, but missed the 36-hole cut there, too.

Suzuki ended a five-year winless drought in Japan in 2009 with a five stroke win in October at the mynavi ABC Championship.

Suzuki has earned over ¥822,000,000 in his career on the Japan Golf Tour, which is equivalent to over $8,200,000.

== Personal life ==
Suzuki is the father of two children, one of whom is Airi Suzuki, a Japanese pop singer.

== Professional wins (18) ==
=== Japan Golf Tour wins (8) ===
| No. | Date | Tournament | Winning score | Margin of victory | Runner(s)-up |
|---|---|---|---|---|---|
| 1 | 26 Sep 1993 | Gene Sarazen Jun Classic | −12 (71-71-69-65=276) | 1 stroke | (Japan) Tsuneyuki Nakajima, (Japan) Masashi Ozaki |
| 2 | 24 Jul 1994 | Nikkei Cup | −20 (72-67-65-64=268) | 5 strokes | (Japan) Katsunari Takahashi |
| 3 | 24 Mar 1996 | Novell KSB Open | −13 (68-72-68-67=275) | 1 stroke | (Colombia) Eduardo Herrera, (United States) Brian Watts |
| 4 | 14 Jun 1998 | Sapporo Tokyu Open | −16 (65-69-69-69=272) | 2 strokes | (United States) David Ishii |
| 5 | 26 Nov 2000 | Casio World Open | −21 (68-67-65-67=267) | 1 stroke | (Japan) Masashi Ozaki |
| 6 | 9 Jun 2002 | JCB Classic Sendai | −13 (69-67-65-70=271) | Playoff | (Japan) Tsuneyuki Nakajima |
| 7 | 3 Oct 2004 | Acom International | −13 (72-65-63=200) (Note: Shortened to 54 holes due to weather.) | 3 strokes | (Australia) Paul Sheehan |
| 8 | 1 Nov 2009 | Mynavi ABC Championship | −14 (70-67-66-71=274) | 5 strokes | (Japan) Takashi Kanemoto |

Japan Golf Tour playoff record (1–4)

| No. | Year | Tournament | Opponent | Result |
|---|---|---|---|---|
| 1 | 1997 | Golf Digest Tournament | (United States) Brandt Jobe | Lost to birdie on first extra hole |
| 2 | 2001 | Tamanoi Yomiuri Open | (Japan) Yoshimitsu Fukuzawa | Lost to par on first extra hole |
| 3 | 2001 | Aiful Cup | (Taiwan) Lin Keng-chi | Lost to birdie on second extra hole |
| 4 | 2002 | JCB Classic Sendai | (Japan) Tsuneyuki Nakajima | Won with par on second extra hole |
| 5 | 2007 | Sun Chlorella Classic | (Japan) Jun Kikuchi | Lost to par on third extra hole |

=== Japan Challenge Tour wins (3) ===
| No. | Date | Tournament | Winning score | Margin of victory | Runner(s)-up |
|---|---|---|---|---|---|
| 1 | 13 Sep 2013 | Dragon Cup | –14 (69-61=130) | 2 strokes | (Japan) Shota Kishimoto |
| 2 | 13 Jun 2014 | Fuji Country Kani Club Challenge Cup | –9 (70-65=135) | 2 strokes | (Japan) Ryuji Masaoka, (Japan) Katsufumi Okino, (Japan) Keisuke Sato |
| 3 | 12 Sep 2014 | Himawari Dragon Cup | –13 (63-68=131) | 1 stroke | (South Korea) Lee Tae-hee, (Japan) Shinji Tomimura |

=== Other wins (1) ===
- 1994 Sanko Grand Summer Championship

=== Japan PGA Senior Tour wins (6) ===
| No. | Date | Tournament | Winning score | Margin of victory | Runner(s)-up |
|---|---|---|---|---|---|
| 1 | 28 Oct 2018 | Fukuoka Senior Open | −7 (70-67=137) | Playoff | (United States) Gregory Meyer |
| 2 | 10 Nov 2018 | Elite Grip Senior Open | −7 (67-66=133) | Playoff | (Japan) Naoyuki Tamura |
| 3 | 25 Nov 2018 | Iwasaki Shiratsuyu Senior Golf Tournament | −10 (70-71-65=206) | 3 strokes | (South Korea) Kim Jong-duck, (United States) Gregory Meyer |
| 4 | 23 Aug 2020 | ISPS Handa Corona Ni Katsu Senior Tournament | −19 (64-65-68=197) | 1 stroke | (Japan) Kiyoshi Murota, (Japan) Tsukasa Watanabe |
| 5 | 27 Nov 2021 | Iwasaki Shiratsuyu Senior Tournament | −6 (68-69-73=210) | Playoff | (United States) Gregory Meyer |
| 6 | 21 Aug 2022 | Fancl Classic | −11 (68-69-68=205) | 3 strokes | (Thailand) Thaworn Wiratchant |

== Team appearances ==
- World Cup (representing Japan): 1994
- Dynasty Cup (representing Japan): 2003, 2005
