= Christian Peña =

American golfer (born 1968)

Personal information
- Nationality: United States
- Born: September 18, 1968 (age 58) Albuquerque, New Mexico, U.S.
- Height: 5 ft 9 in (1.75 m)
- Weight: 169 lb (77 kg; 12.1 st)

Career
- Sport: Golf
- College: University of Arizona
- Turned professional: 1991
- Former tours: Nationwide Tour; European Tour; Japan Golf Tour; Asian Tour
- Professional wins: 3

Number of wins by tour
- Japan Golf Tour: 1
- Asian Tour: 2

Best results in major championships
- Masters Tournament: DNP
- PGA Championship: DNP
- U.S. Open: T45: 1995
- The Open Championship: DNP

Christian Peña (born September 18, 1968) is an American professional golfer.

== Career ==
Peña played golf at the University of Arizona from 1987 to 1991. He was a first-team All-American in 1991. He graduated with a finance degree in 1992 and was inducted into the University of Arizona Sports Hall of Fame in 1996.

Peña played on the Nike Tour in 1993 and 1994. His best finishes were a pair of T-6s, at the 1993 Nike Monterrey Open and the 1994 Nike Sonoma County Open. He played five seasons on the Asian Tour from 1996 to 2000, winning twice. He had limited status on the European Tour in 2000. He played on the Japan Golf Tour from 2000 to 2007, winning once.

== Awards and honors ==
- In 1991, Peña earned first-team All-American honors.
- In 1996, he was inducted into the University of Arizona Sports Hall of Fame.

== Professional wins (3) ==
=== Japan Golf Tour wins (1) ===
No.	Date	Tournament	Winning score	Margin of victory	Runners-up
1	Aug 11, 2002	Sun Chlorella Classic	−19 (67-67-66-69=269)	Playoff	(Australia) Brendan Jones, (Japan) Naomichi Ozaki

Japan Golf Tour playoff record (1–0)

No.	Year	Tournament	Opponents	Result
1	2002	Sun Chlorella Classic	(Australia) Brendan Jones, (Japan) Naomichi Ozaki	Won with birdie on first extra hole

=== Asian PGA Tour wins (1) ===
No.	Date	Tournament	Winning score	Margin of victory	Runner-up
1	Nov 16, 1997	Volvo Masters of Malaysia	−12 (69-70-68-69=276)	1 stroke	(Taiwan) Hsieh Yu-shu

=== Asia Golf Circuit wins (1) ===
No.	Date	Tournament	Winning score	Margin of victory	Runner-up
1	Mar 9, 1996	Matoa Nasional Invitational	−13 (72-66-68-69=275)	Playoff	(Canada) Rick Todd
