= Robert Groom (cricketer) =

English cricketer

Personal information
- Full name: Robert Groom
- Born: 23 March 1816; Shoreditch, Middlesex, England
- Died: 22 March 1891 (aged 74); Bethnal Green, London, England
- Batting: Unknown

Domestic team information
- Years: Team
- 1846: Surrey

Career statistics
Competition	First-class
Matches	2
Runs scored	11
Batting average	3.66
100s/50s	–/–
Top score	4
Balls bowled	–
Wickets	–
Bowling average	–
5 wickets in innings	–
10 wickets in match	–
Best bowling	–
Catches/stumpings	1/–
- Source: Cricinfo, 7 April 2013

Robert Groom (23 March 1816 – 22 March 1891) was an English cricketer. Groom's batting style is unknown. He was born at Shoreditch, Middlesex.

Groom made two first-class appearances for Surrey in 1846, both against Kent, with the first match played at The Oval and the second at Preston Hall in Kent. Groom scored a total of 11 runs in his two matches, with a high score of 4.

He died at Bethnal Green, London on 22 March 1891.
