= 2000 Japan Golf Tour =

Golf tour season

2000 Japan Golf Tour season
- Duration: 9 March 2000 – 10 December 2000
- Number of official events: 33
- Most wins: (Japan) Shingo Katayama (5)
- Money list: (Japan) Shingo Katayama
- Most Valuable Player: (Japan) Shingo Katayama
- Rookie of the Year: (United States) Dean Wilson

The 2000 Japan Golf Tour, titled as the 2000 iiyama Tour for sponsorship reasons, was the 28th season of the Japan Golf Tour (formerly the PGA of Japan Tour), the main professional golf tour in Japan since it was formed in 1973.

== Iiyama title sponsorship ==
It was the first season in which the tour had signed a title sponsorship agreement with Iiyama, being renamed as the iiyama Tour. The agreement was reported to be worth ¥1,500,000,000 over three years.

== Schedule ==
The following table lists official events during the 2000 season.

Date	Tournament	Location	Purse (¥)	Winner (Note: The number in brackets after each winner's name is the number of Japan Golf Tour events they had won up to and including that tournament. This information is only shown for Japan Golf Tour members.)	OWGR points	Notes
12 Mar	Token Corporation Cup	Kagoshima	100,000,000	(Japan) Nobuo Serizawa (5)	16	
19 Mar	Dydo Drinco Shizuoka Open	Shizuoka	100,000,000	(Japan) Hidemichi Tanaka (7)	16	
16 Apr	Tsuruya Open	Hyōgo	100,000,000	(Australia) Richard Backwell (1)	16	
23 Apr	Asia Pacific Open Golf Championship Kirin Open	Ibaraki	100,000,000	(Japan) Shingo Katayama (3)	16	
30 Apr	The Crowns	Aichi	110,000,000	(Japan) Hidemichi Tanaka (8)	24	
7 May	Fujisankei Classic	Shizuoka	110,000,000	(Japan) Tateo Ozaki (15)	16	
14 May	Japan PGA Championship	Chiba	110,000,000	(Japan) Nobuhito Sato (3)	16	Japan major
21 May	Munsingwear Open KSB Cup	Okayama	120,000,000	(Japan) Shingo Katayama (4)	16	New tournament
28 May	Mitsubishi Motors Tournament	Shiga	100,000,000	(Japan) Hirofumi Miyase (3)	16	
4 Jun	JCB Classic Sendai	Miyagi	100,000,000	(Japan) Nobuhito Sato (4)	16	
11 Jun	PGA Philanthropy Tournament	Nara	50,000,000	(Japan) Masashi Shimada (1)	16	
18 Jun	Tamanoi Yomiuri Open	Hyōgo	90,000,000	(Japan) Yoshi Mizumaki (7)	16	
25 Jun	Gateway to The Open Mizuno Open	Okayama	90,000,000	(Japan) Yasuharu Imano (2)	16	
2 Jul	JGTO TPC iiyama Cup	Tochigi	120,000,000	(Japan) Toshimitsu Izawa (5)	16	New tournament Japan major
9 Jul	Juken Sangyo Open Hiroshima	Hiroshima	90,000,000	(Japan) Keiichiro Fukabori (3)	16	
16 Jul	Aiful Cup	Aomori	90,000,000	(United States) Dean Wilson (1)	16	
30 Jul	NST Niigata Open Golf Championship	Niigata	50,000,000	(Japan) Hidezumi Shirakata (1)	16	
6 Aug	Sun Chlorella Classic	Hokkaidō	100,000,000	(Japan) Masashi Ozaki (93)	16	
27 Aug	Hisamitsu-KBC Augusta	Fukuoka	90,000,000	(Japan) Toshimitsu Izawa (6)	16	
3 Sep	Japan PGA Match-Play Championship Promise Cup	Hokkaidō	80,000,000	(Japan) Kaname Yokoo (3)	16	
10 Sep	Suntory Open	Chiba	90,000,000	(Japan) Kiyoshi Maita (1)	16	
17 Sep	ANA Open	Hokkaidō	100,000,000	(Japan) Nobuhito Sato (5)	16	
24 Sep	Acom International	Ibaraki	110,000,000	(Japan) Toru Taniguchi (2)	16	
8 Oct	Tokai Classic	Aichi	100,000,000	(Japan) Hirofumi Miyase (4)	16	
15 Oct	Japan Open Golf Championship	Chiba	120,000,000	(Japan) Naomichi Ozaki (29)	32	Flagship event (Note: Also a Japan major championship.)
22 Oct	Bridgestone Open	Chiba	110,000,000	(Japan) Nobuhito Sato (6)	16	
29 Oct	Philip Morris Championship	Hyōgo	200,000,000	(Japan) Toru Taniguchi (3)	16	
5 Nov	Ube Kosan Open	Yamaguchi	140,000,000	(Japan) Keiichiro Fukabori (4)	16	
12 Nov	Sumitomo Visa Taiheiyo Masters	Shizuoka	140,000,000	(Japan) Toshimitsu Izawa (7)	16	
19 Nov	Dunlop Phoenix Tournament	Miyazaki	200,000,000	(Japan) Shingo Katayama (5)	34	
26 Nov	Casio World Open	Kagoshima	140,000,000	(Japan) Toru Suzuki (5)	22	
3 Dec	Golf Nippon Series JT Cup	Tokyo	90,000,000	(Japan) Shingo Katayama (6)	16	Japan major
10 Dec	Fancl Open in Okinawa	Okinawa	90,000,000	(Japan) Shingo Katayama (7)	16	

=== Unofficial events ===
The following events were sanctioned by the Japan Golf Tour, but did not carry official money, nor were wins official.

Date	Tournament	Location	Purse	Winner	OWGR points	Notes
9 Apr	Masters Tournament	United States	US$4,600,000	(Fiji) Vijay Singh	100	Major championship
18 Jun	U.S. Open	United States	US$4,500,000	(United States) Tiger Woods	100	Major championship
23 Jul	The Open Championship	Scotland	£2,800,000	(United States) Tiger Woods	100	Major championship
20 Aug	PGA Championship	United States	US$5,000,000	(United States) Tiger Woods	100	Major championship

== Money list ==
The money list was based on prize money won during the season, calculated in Japanese yen.

Position	Player	Prize money (¥)
1	(Japan) Shingo Katayama	177,116,489
2	(Japan) Toru Taniguchi	175,829,742
3	(Japan) Nobuhito Sato	155,246,900
4	(Japan) Toshimitsu Izawa	120,316,633
5	(Japan) Hidemichi Tanaka	108,807,851

== Awards ==
Award	Winner	Ref.
Most Valuable Player	(Japan) Shingo Katayama	
Rookie of the Year (Shimada Trophy)	(United States) Dean Wilson	

== Japan Challenge Tour ==
2000 Japan Challenge Tour season
- Duration: 13 April 2000 – 2 November 2000
- Number of official events: 13
- Most wins: (Japan) Masanori Kobayashi (2)
- Money list: (Japan) Masanori Kobayashi

The 2000 Japan Challenge Tour was the 16th season of the Japan Challenge Tour, the official development tour to the Japan Golf Tour.

=== Schedule ===
The following table lists official events during the 2000 season.

Date	Tournament	Location	Purse (¥)	Winner (Note: The number in brackets after each winner's name is the number of Japan Challenge Tour events they had won up to and including that tournament. It is rare for someone to accumulate many wins on the Japan Challenge Tour as success at this level usually leads to promotion to the Japan Golf Tour.)
14 Apr	PRGR Cup (East)	Tochigi	10,000,000	(Japan) Naoki Hattori (1)
20 Apr	Kourakuen Cup (1st)	Oita	10,000,000	(Japan) Mitsuhiro Tateyama (1)
27 Apr	Nishino Cup Open	Ibaraki	10,000,000	(Japan) Koichi Nogami (1)
12 May	Hisamitsu Seiyaku KBC Challenge	Fukuoka	10,000,000	(Japan) Masanori Kobayashi (1)
2 Jun	Aiful Challenge Cup Spring	Hyōgo	10,000,000	(Japan) Yukiharu Morita (1)
6 Jul	Kourakuen Cup (2nd)	Tochigi	10,000,000	(Japan) Hajime Tanaka (1)
19 Jul	PRGR Cup (West)	Shiga	10,000,000	(Japan) Masanori Kobayashi (2)
3 Aug	JGTO iiyama Challenge 1	Shiga	10,000,000	(Japan) Taisuke Kitajima (4)
21 Sep	Aiful Challenge Cup Autumn	Fukushima	10,000,000	(Japan) Yoshimitsu Fukuzawa (1)
5 Oct	JGTO iiyama Challenge 2	Hyōgo	10,000,000	(Japan) Takeshi Ohyama (1)
21 Oct	Shinwa Golf Classic	Shiga	10,000,000	(Japan) Tatsuo Takasaki (1)
2 Nov	Kourakuen Cup (3rd)	Chiba	10,000,000	(Japan) Yui Ueda (1)

=== Money list ===
The money list was based on prize money won during the season, calculated in Japanese yen. The top five players on the money list earned status to play on the 2001 Japan Golf Tour (iiyama Tour).

Position	Player	Prize money (¥)
1	(Japan) Masanori Kobayashi	3,851,250
2	(Japan) Tatsuo Takasaki	3,838,130
3	(Japan) Naoki Hattori	3,477,724
4	(Japan) Yoshimitsu Fukuzawa	3,414,967
5	(Japan) Taisuke Kitajima	3,058,938
