= Keiichiro Fukabori =

Japanese professional golfer

Keiichiro Fukabori 深堀圭一郎
Personal information
- Full name: Keiichiro Fukabori
- Nationality: Japan
- Born: 9 October 1968 (age 58) Tokyo, Japan
- Height: 1.73 m (5 ft 8 in)
- Weight: 68 kg (150 lb; 10.7 st)

Career
- Sport: Golf
- Turned professional: 1995
- Current tour: Japan PGA Senior Tour
- Former tour: Japan Golf Tour
- Professional wins: 12
- Highest ranking: 91 (30 December 2001)

Number of wins by tour
- Japan Golf Tour: 8
- Other: 4

Best results in major championships
- Masters Tournament: DNP
- PGA Championship: DNP
- U.S. Open: T57: 2005
- The Open Championship: T30: 2004

Keiichiro Fukabori (深堀圭一郎, Fukabori Kei'ichirō; born 9 October 1968) is a Japanese professional golfer who currently plays on the Japan Golf Tour. He has eight wins on the Tour, and had his best year during the 2000 season.

== Career ==
Fukabori was born in Tokyo. He turned professional in 1995.

Fukabori's best finish in a major was a tie for 30th at the 2004 Open Championship. He also finished tied for 57th in the 2005 U.S. Open.

== Professional wins (12) ==
=== Japan Golf Tour wins (8) ===
Legend
Flagship events (1)
Japan majors (1) (Note: The 2003 Japan Open Golf Championship was also a Japan major championship.)
Other Japan Golf Tour (7)

No.	Date	Tournament	Winning score	Margin of victory	Runner(s)-up
1	30 Mar 1997	Just System KSB Open	−12 (69-64-69-74=276)	2 strokes	(Japan) Katsunori Kuwabara, (Japan) Toshiaki Odate
2	20 Sep 1998	ANA Open	−9 (71-71-68-69=279)	2 strokes	(United States) Lee Janzen, (Japan) Katsumasa Miyamoto
3	9 Jul 2000	Juken Sangyo Open Hiroshima	−13 (67-67-70-71=275)	1 stroke	(Japan) Masashi Ozaki
4	5 Nov 2000	Ube Kosan Open	−12 (70-72-69-65=276)	3 strokes	(Japan) Tatsuya Shiraishi, (Japan) Toru Taniguchi
5	8 Jul 2001	Juken Sangyo Open Hiroshima (2)	−13 (67-67-69=203) (Note: Shortened to 54 holes due to weather.)	Playoff	(Japan) Masashi Ozaki
6	19 Oct 2003	Japan Open Golf Championship	−8 (66-75-71-64=276)	2 strokes	(Japan) Yasuharu Imano
7	7 Aug 2005	Sun Chlorella Classic	−15 (67-70-70-66=273)	1 stroke	(Japan) Hidemasa Hoshino
8	18 Sep 2005	ANA Open (2)	−14 (72-62-72-68=274)	Playoff	(Japan) Yasuharu Imano

Japan Golf Tour playoff record (2–0)

No.	Year	Tournament	Opponent	Result
1	2001	Juken Sangyo Open Hiroshima	(Japan) Masashi Ozaki	Won with par on first extra hole
2	2005	ANA Open	(Japan) Yasuharu Imano	Won with birdie on first extra hole

=== Japan Challenge Tour wins (1) ===
- 1993 Korakuen Cup (5th)

=== Other wins (1) ===
- 1996 Kanto Open (Japan)

=== Japan PGA Senior Tour wins (2) ===
No.	Date	Tournament	Winning score	Margin of victory	Runner-up
1	30 Jul 2021	Hokkaido Brooks More Surprise Cup	−6 (69-69=138)	Playoff	(Japan) Kazuhiko Hosokawa
2	10 Sep 2022	Komatsu Open	−13 (68-69-66=203)	Playoff	(Thailand) Prayad Marksaeng

== Results in major championships ==
Tournament	1998	1999	2000	2001	2002	2003	2004	2005	2006
U.S. Open								T57	CUT
The Open Championship	CUT						T30		T56

Did not play

T = Tied
CUT = missed the halfway cut
Note: Fukabori never played in the Masters Tournament or the PGA Championship.

== Team appearances ==
- Dynasty Cup (representing Japan): 2003, 2005
- Royal Trophy (representing Asia): 2006
