= Masashi Shimada =

Japanese golfer

Personal information
- Nationality: Japan
- Born: 1 July 1971 (age 55) Shiga Prefecture, Japan
- Height: 1.84 m (6 ft 0 in)
- Weight: 83 kg (183 lb; 13.1 st)

Career
- Sport: Golf
- Status: Professional
- Current tour: Japan Golf Tour
- Professional wins: 2

Number of wins by tour
- Japan Golf Tour: 1
- Other: 1

Masashi Shimada (born 1 July 1971) is a Japanese professional golfer.

== Career ==
Shimada plays on the Japan Golf Tour, where he has won once.

== Professional wins (2) ==
=== Japan Golf Tour wins (1) ===
No.	Date	Tournament	Winning score	Margin of victory	Runners-up
1	11 Jun 2000	PGA Philanthropy Tournament	−15 (66-68-67=201) (Note: Shortened to 54 holes due to weather.)	Playoff	(Japan) Tatsuya Mitsuhashi, (Japan) Tatsuhiko Takahashi

Japan Golf Tour playoff record (1–0)

No.	Year	Tournament	Opponents	Result
1	2000	PGA Philanthropy Tournament	(Japan) Tatsuya Mitsuhashi, (Japan) Tatsuhiko Takahashi	Won with birdie on fourth extra hole Takahashi eliminated by birdie on first hole

=== Other wins (1) ===
- 2001 Chubu Open
