= Arthur Hesketh Groom =

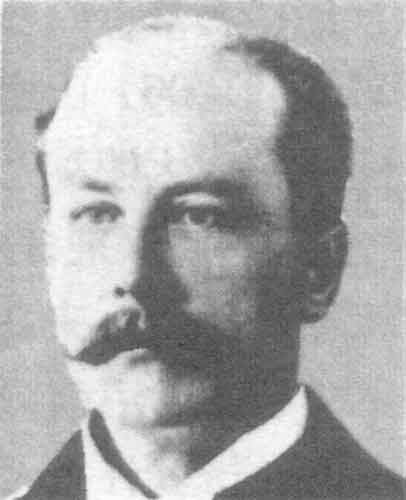
Arthur Hesketh Groom

Arthur Hesketh Groom (1846–1918) was the founder of the Kobe Golf Club, Japan's first golf club. Groom came to Japan in 1868 and became a long-term resident of Kobe. He was a known outdoorsman and mountaineer, and it is his appreciation for the local mountains near Kobe and a lament that golf was unavailable in Japan that led him and a group of friends to found the club.

== See also ==
- Anglo-Japanese relations
- List of people with surname Groom
