= 1974 Masters Tournament =

- Front cover of the 1974 Masters Guide

Tournament information
- Dates: April 11–14, 1974
- Location: Augusta, Georgia; 33.503°N 82.020°W
- Course: Augusta National Golf Club
- Organized by: Augusta National Golf Club
- Tour: PGA Tour

Statistics
- Par: 72
- Length: 7,020 yards (6,419 m)
- Field: 78 players, 44 after cut
- Cut: 148 (+4)
- Winner's share: $35,000

Champion
- (South Africa) Gary Player
- 278 (−10)
- Location in the United States Location in Georgia

The 1974 Masters Tournament was the 38th Masters Tournament, held on April 11–14 at the Augusta National Golf Club in Augusta, Georgia.

Gary Player won the second of his three Masters titles at 278 (−10), two strokes ahead of runners-up Dave Stockton and Tom Weiskopf. It was the seventh of his nine major championships. Player did not enter the previous year's tournament due to leg and abdominal surgery; it was the only Masters that he missed in 53 years.

Defending champion Tommy Aaron missed the cut by two strokes. Jack Burke Jr., the 1956 champion, competed at the Masters for the final time.

== Field ==
1. Masters champions

Tommy Aaron (8,12), George Archer, Gay Brewer (8,12), Jack Burke Jr., Billy Casper (8,11,12,13), Charles Coody, Doug Ford, Bob Goalby (8), Herman Keiser, Jack Nicklaus (2,3,4,8,9,10,11,12), Arnold Palmer (8,9,12), Gary Player (4,9,11), Sam Snead, Art Wall Jr.

- Jimmy Demaret, Ralph Guldahl, Claude Harmon, Ben Hogan, Cary Middlecoff, Byron Nelson, Henry Picard, and Gene Sarazen did not play.

The following categories only apply to Americans

2. U.S. Open champions (last five years)

Johnny Miller (8,9,11), Orville Moody

- Lee Trevino (3,9,11,12) did not play

3. The Open champions (last five years)

Tom Weiskopf (9,10.11,12)

4. PGA champions (last five years)

Raymond Floyd (9), Dave Stockton (8,11)

5. 1973 U.S. Amateur quarter-finalists

William C. Campbell (a), Henri DeLozier (a), Vinny Giles (6,7,a), Downing Gray (a), Billy Kratzert (a), Dick Siderowf (6,7,a), Craig Stadler (6,a), David Strawn (a)

6. Previous two U.S. Amateur and Amateur champions

7. Members of the 1973 U.S. Walker Cup team

Gary Koch (a), Mark Pfeil (a), Marty West (a)

- Doug Ballenger, Danny Edwards, Jimmy Ellis, Mike Killian, and Bill Rogers forfeited their exemptions by turning professional.

8. Top 24 players and ties from the 1973 Masters Tournament

Frank Beard, Ben Crenshaw (11), Gardner Dickinson, Bob Dickson, Lou Graham (11), Hubert Green (11), Paul Harney, Babe Hiskey, Jim Jamieson, Gene Littler (11), Bobby Nichols (11), Phil Rodgers, Chi-Chi Rodríguez (12), Mason Rudolph (10), J. C. Snead (10,12), Kermit Zarley

- Don January did not play

9. Top 16 players and ties from the 1973 U.S. Open

Julius Boros, Jim Colbert, Al Geiberger, Jerry Heard (11), Ralph Johnston, John Schlee, Lanny Wadkins (10,11), Larry Ziegler

10. Top eight players and ties from 1973 PGA Championship

Don Iverson, Dan Sikes

11. Winners of PGA Tour events since the previous Masters

Sam Adams, Buddy Allin, Miller Barber, Homero Blancas (12), Bert Greene, Dave Hill, Hale Irwin (12), John Mahaffey, John Schroeder, Ed Sneed, Leonard Thompson

- Deane Beman did not play, as he was now serving as commissioner of the PGA Tour

12. Members of the U.S. 1973 Ryder Cup team

13. Foreign invitations

Isao Aoki, Hugh Baiocchi, Maurice Bembridge, Bob Charles (9,11), Bruce Crampton (10,11), Bruce Devlin (8), Trevor Homer (6,a), Tony Jacklin (2,3), Graham Marsh, Peter Oosterhuis, Masashi Ozaki (8)

- Numbers in brackets indicate categories that the player would have qualified under had they been American.

== Round summaries ==
=== First round ===
Thursday, April 11, 1974

Place	Player	Score	To par
1	(United States) Jim Colbert	67	−5
T2	(United States) Hubert Green	68	−4
T2	(United States) Hale Irwin	68	−4
T2	(United States) Don Iverson	68	−4
T5	(United States) Frank Beard	69	−3
T5	(United States) Raymond Floyd	69	−3
T5	(United States) Gene Littler	69	−3
T5	(United States) Jack Nicklaus	69	−3
T5	(United States) Dan Sikes	69	−3
T10	(United States) Billy Casper	70	−2
T10	(Australia) Bruce Devlin	70	−2
T10	(United States) Jerry Heard	70	−2
T10	(United States) Babe Hiskey	70	−2
T10	(United States) Chi-Chi Rodríguez	70	−2
T10	(United States) Art Wall Jr.	70	−2

=== Second round ===
Friday, April 12, 1974

Place	Player	Score	To par
1	(United States) Dave Stockton	71-66=137	−7
T2	(United States) Hubert Green	68-70=138	−6
T2	(United States) Hale Irwin	68-70=138	−6
T4	(United States) Frank Beard	69-70=139	−5
T4	(United States) Jim Colbert	67-72=139	−5
T6	(United States) Jerry Heard	70-70=140	−4
T6	(United States) Gene Littler	69-71=140	−4
T6	(United States) Jack Nicklaus	69-71=140	−4
T6	(United States) Dan Sikes	69-71=140	−4
T6	(United States) Tom Weiskopf	71-69=140	−4

=== Third round ===
Saturday, April 13, 1974

Place	Player	Score	To par
1	(United States) Dave Stockton	71-66-70=207	−9
T2	(United States) Jim Colbert	67-72-69=208	−8
T2	(South Africa) Gary Player	71-71-66=208	−8
T4	(United States) Bobby Nichols	73-68-68=209	−7
T4	(United States) Phil Rodgers	72-69-68=209	−7
T6	(United States) Hale Irwin	68-70-72=210	−6
T6	(United States) Tom Weiskopf	71-69-70=210	−6
8	(United States) Frank Beard	68-70-72=211	−5
T9	(United States) Hubert Green	68-70-74=212	−4
T9	(United States) Jack Nicklaus	69-71-72=212	−4

=== Final round ===
Sunday, April 14, 1974

==== Final leaderboard ====
Champion
(a) = amateur
(c) = past champion

Top 10
Place	Player	Score	To par	Money (US$)
1	(South Africa) Gary Player (c)	71-71-66-70=278	−10	35,000
T2	(United States) Dave Stockton	71-66-70-73=280	−8	21,250
T2	(United States) Tom Weiskopf	71-69-70-70=280	−8	21,250
T4	(United States) Jim Colbert	67-72-69-73=281	−7	10,833
T4	(United States) Hale Irwin	68-70-72-71=281	−7	10,833
T4	(United States) Jack Nicklaus (c)	69-71-72-69=281	−7	10,833
T7	(United States) Bobby Nichols	73-68-68-73=282	−6	4,750
T7	(United States) Phil Rodgers	72-69-68-73=282	−6	4,750
T9	(England) Maurice Bembridge	73-74-72-64=283	−5	3,900
T9	(United States) Hubert Green	68-70-74-71=283	−5	3,900

Leaderboard below the top 10
Place	Player	Score	To par	Money ($)
T11	(Australia) Bruce Crampton	73-72-69-70=284	−4	3,375
T11	(United States) Jerry Heard	70-70-73-71=284	−4	3,375
T11	(United States) Dave Hill	71-72-70-71=284	−4	3,375
T11	(United States) Arnold Palmer (c)	76-71-70-67=284	−4	3,375
T15	(United States) Buddy Allin	73-73-70-69=285	−3	2,900
T15	(United States) Miller Barber	75-67-72-71=285	−3	2,900
T15	(United States) Ralph Johnston	72-71-70-72=285	−3	2,900
T15	(United States) Johnny Miller	72-74-69-70=285	−3	2,900
T15	(United States) Dan Sikes	69-71-74-71=285	−3	2,900
T20	(United States) Chi-Chi Rodríguez	70-74-71-71=286	−2	2,550
T20	(United States) Sam Snead (c)	72-72-71-71=286	−2	2,550
T22	(United States) Frank Beard	69-70-72-76=287	−1	2,275
T22	(United States) Ben Crenshaw	75-70-70-72=287	−1	2,275
T22	(United States) Raymond Floyd	69-72-76-70=287	−1	2,275
T22	(United States) Bob Goalby (c)	76-71-72-68=287	−1	2,275
T26	(United States) Julius Boros	75-70-69-74=288	E	1,850
T26	(United States) John Schlee	75-71-71-71=288	E	1,850
T26	(United States) J. C. Snead	73-68-74-73=288	E	1,850
T29	(United States) Charles Coody (c)	74-72-76-67=289	+1	1,850
T29	(United States) Don Iverson	68-74-73-74=289	+1	1,850
T31	(South Africa) Hugh Baiocchi	75-71-74-70=290	+2	1,775
T31	(Australia) Bruce Devlin	70-72-76-72=290	+2	1,775
T31	(United States) Al Geiberger	76-68-70-76=290	+2	1,775
T31	(Australia) Graham Marsh	76-69-72-73=290	+2	1,775
T31	(England) Peter Oosterhuis	79-68-68-75=290	+2	1,775
T31	(United States) Kermit Zarley	73-71-77-69=290	+2	1,775
T37	(United States) Billy Casper (c)	70-71-76-74=291	+3	1,775
T37	(United States) Art Wall Jr. (c)	70-77-72-72=291	+3	1,775
T39	(United States) Gene Littler	69-71-78-74=292	+4	1,700
T39	(United States) Larry Ziegler	72-73-73-74=292	+4	1,700
T41	(United States) Babe Hiskey	70-78-75-72=295	+7	1,700
T41	(United States) Leonard Thompson	73-72-77-73=295	+7	1,700
43	(United States) Ed Sneed	74-74-77-72=297	+9	1,700
44	(United States) Orville Moody	74-73-78-77=302	+14	1,700
CUT	(United States) Homero Blancas	73-76=149	+5	
CUT	(England) Trevor Homer (a)	77-72=149	+5	
CUT	(United States) John Mahaffey	71-78=149	+5	
CUT	(Japan) Masashi Ozaki	79-70=149	+5	
CUT	(United States) Mason Rudolph	78-71=149	+5	
CUT	(United States) Tommy Aaron (c)	77-73=150	+6	
CUT	(United States) Gay Brewer (c)	75-75=150	+6	
CUT	(United States) Henri DeLozier (a)	74-76=150	+6	
CUT	(United States) Vinny Giles (a)	74-76=150	+6	
CUT	(United States) Lou Graham	76-74=150	+6	
CUT	(United States) Gary Koch (a)	76-74=150	+6	
CUT	(United States) Jack Burke Jr. (c)	72-79=151	+7	
CUT	(United States) Gardner Dickinson	71-80=151	+7	
CUT	(United States) Doug Ford (c)	76-75=151	+7	
CUT	(United States) Downing Gray (a)	75-76=151	+7	
CUT	(United States) John Schroeder	76-75=151	+7	
CUT	(United States) Dick Siderowf (a)	74-77=151	+7	
CUT	(United States) William C. Campbell (a)	74-78=152	+8	
CUT	(New Zealand) Bob Charles	73-79=152	+8	
CUT	(England) Tony Jacklin	81-71=152	+8	
CUT	(United States) Billy Kratzert (a)	79-73=152	+8	
CUT	(United States) Mark Pfeil (a)	75-77=152	+8	
CUT	(United States) David Strawn (a)	77-75=152	+8	
CUT	(United States) Paul Harney	77-76=153	+9	
CUT	(United States) Craig Stadler (a)	79-74=153	+9	
CUT	(United States) Marty West (a)	73-80=153	+9	
CUT	(Japan) Isao Aoki	74-80=154	+10	
CUT	(United States) Lanny Wadkins	74-80=154	+10	
CUT	(United States) Bob Dickson	76-79=155	+11	
CUT	(United States) Jim Jamieson	80-75=155	+11	
CUT	(United States) Herman Keiser (c)	76-79=155	+11	
CUT	(United States) Sam Adams	80-79=159	+15	
CUT	(United States) Bert Greene	81-81=162	+18	
WD	(United States) George Archer (c)	75	+3	

==== Scorecard ====
Hole	1	2	3	4	5	6	7	8	9	10	11	12	13	14	15	16	17	18
Par	4	5	4	3	4	3	4	5	4	4	4	3	5	4	5	3	4	4
(South Africa) Player	−8	−8	−8	−8	−8	−9	−9	−9	−10	−9	−9	−8	−9	−9	−9	−9	−10	−10
(United States) Stockton	−9	−9	−9	−9	−9	−9	−9	−9	−8	−8	−7	−7	−8	−8	−8	−8	−8	−8
(United States) Weiskopf	−6	−6	−6	−7	−7	−7	−8	−9	−9	−8	−7	−7	−8	−8	−9	−8	−8	−8
(United States) Colbert	−8	−9	−8	−8	−7	−7	−6	−7	−7	−7	−6	−6	−6	−6	−5	−5	−5	−7
(United States) Irwin	−6	−6	−6	−6	−5	−5	−4	−5	−5	−5	−5	−6	−7	−7	−7	−8	−8	−7
(United States) Nicklaus	−4	−4	−4	−5	−5	−5	−5	−6	−6	−6	−6	−6	−8	−7	−8	−7	−7	−7

Cumulative tournament scores, relative to par

Eagle	Birdie	Bogey	Double bogey	Triple bogey+
