= Steve Oppermann =

American professional golfer (born 1942)

Personal information
- Nickname: Oppy
- Nationality: United States
- Born: January 31, 1942 (age 84) San Francisco, California, U.S.
- Height: 5 ft 11 in (180 cm)
- Weight: 175 lb (79 kg)
- Spouse: Peggy
- Children: 2

Career
- Sport: Golf
- Turned professional: 1964
- Former tour: PGA Tour
- Professional wins: 4

Best results in major championships
- Masters Tournament: T50: 1966
- PGA Championship: DNP
- U.S. Open: 15th: 1965
- The Open Championship: DNP

Steve Oppermann (born January 31, 1942) is an American professional golfer. Oppermann had a sterling amateur career, being regarded as "one of the most talented amateurs in the West," culminating with victories at two "blue ribbon" events, the 1964 Western Amateur and California State Amateur Championship. Shortly after these victories he turned professional. He played on the PGA Tour for nine seasons and recorded two second-place finishes. However, he failed to win and did not record many other high results. In 1973 he quit tournament golf and has worked as a club professional in southeastern United States for the remainder of his career.

== Early life ==
Oppermann was born in San Francisco, California. He grew up in the suburb of Millbrae, California. He is of German descent. His father was a plumbing contractor. In his teen years, Oppermann played out of Harding Park Golf Club.

Oppermann attended Capuchino High School in San Bruno, California. In the spring of 1957, Oppermann began to have notable results for the high school's golf team. After the school year ended Oppermann received media attention for his play at the three-round Northern California Junior Medal Play tournament. He opened with rounds of 70 and 75 putting him one behind leader John Lotz after the first two days. He shot a third round 75 to finish in a tie for fourth, seven back of champion Lotz. The following February, in 1958, he played the Hayward City Championship, a local professional tournament. Later in the year he led Capuchino High School to the Peninsula League title in golf.

In July, he again played well at the Northern California Junior Medal Play. He opened with consecutive 71s, including a hole-in-one in the second round, to tie Cliff Davis for the lead. However, in the third and final round Davis outplayed Oppermann by two shots, 71 to 73, to win. At the end of regulation, Oppermann was tied for second with Jim Sherman and George Archer. There was a playoff to determine their places. Oppermann won the one-hole playoff, taking solo second, with Sherman taking third and Archer fourth place.

The following year, in late March 1959, he entered the qualifying process for the Northern California junior championship. He shot a 72 (+1) at the qualifier to earn medalist honors. He was considered "the man to beat" in the tournament proper. However, he lost to Tom Culligan, Jr. early in the tournament, 2 up.

In the spring, Capuchino High School's golf season began again. By now he was considered the team's best player. In April, he earned medalist honors in a match against Jefferson High School and led Capuchino to victory. Later in the month they were predicted by the media to repeat as league champions. In May, Capuchino defeated Westmoor High School and Oppermann was again medalist. The following week he "avenged an earlier setback" to Tom Culligan, Jr, who recently defeated him at the Northern California junior championship, defeating him and leading Capuchino's golf team to blowout victory over Serra High School. Later in the year he graduated from Capuchino High School.

== Amateur career ==
In July 1959, a few months after graduation, Oppermann played the two-round Junior Chamber of Commerce State Golf (Jaycee) Tournament in Arcadia, California. He won the event with rounds of 71 and 69. With the victory he earned entry into the national Jaycees tournament held a month later in Virginia. In August, Oppermann played the national Jaycee tournament. The event was played at Elizabeth Manor and Golf and Country Club in Portsmouth, Virginia. Before the tournament proper there were two qualifying rounds. In the first qualifying round Oppermann shot a 71 to put himself in fourth place among 198 other contestants, three back of the lead. He seemed a "cinch qualifier" for the actual tournament. The top 100 players received entry into the tournament proper. Oppermann did easily qualify for the event, finishing in a tie for sixth among qualifiers after a second round 75. Oppermann also opened the tournament proper with a "brilliant effort," shooting a three-under-par 32 on the front nine. However, he "ruined" this good play down the stretch, recording two double-bogeys and two bogeys over the last five holes. He still managed to complete the round in a tie for third, four shots back of leader Fritz Leffingwell. In the second round he shot 36-37 for another 73 (+3). He was now in solo third place, three shots back. In the third round he shot a 75 (+5) to fall into a tie for fourth, now six shots back of leader Leffingwell. In the final round he played poorly and was not in serious contention.

Later in the year Oppermann played the U.S. Amateur. The event was held in Colorado Springs, Colorado. He won his first round match before losing in the second round to Charles Volpone of Newburyport, Massachusetts 3 & 2. Around this time Oppermann started to focus exclusively focus on golf.

By early 1960, Oppermann was playing out of Green Hills Country Club in Millbrae, California. In mid-March he broke the Green Hills' course record shooting an eight-under-par 63. Over the weekend of March 26–27 he played the two-round Blossom Festival Open in Los Gatos, California. On Saturday, he opened with a "sizzling" 66 (−4). In the second round he shot a 71 (+1), "just enough" to win by one. It was Oppermann's "first major tournament victory." In September he played the U.S. Amateur at St. Louis Country Club. He played Bill Harvey of Greensboro, North Carolina in the first round. Oppermann opened well and by the 11th hole had a 3 up lead. Harvey, however, produced a "tremendous comeback," winning the next six holes to win 3 & 1.

In 1961, Oppermann played in two PGA Tour events, the first time he played in any PGA Tour events. Oppermann did not record many other highlights in 1961, however.

In the spring of 1962 Oppermann began taking lessons from Virgil Shreeve, the head club professional at McLaren Park Golf Club. Shreeve improved Oppermann's game immensely. In the summer Oppermann started recording some high results. In July, he attempted to qualify for the U.S. Amateur Public Links. The event was in Buffalo, New York. Over the course of the two-round qualifier, Oppermann shot rounds of 79 and 76 to qualify, albeit ten shots behind medalist George Archer. In the first round he defeated his competitor, Roy Widstrom of Minneapolis, Minnesota, 4 & 2. In the second round he played Archer, also of northern California, whom he had played many times before in local matches. Oppermann scored four birdies, shooting one-under par over the course of the match, to defeat him 4 & 3. In the third round he faced Hubert Farmer of Toledo, Ohio. Oppermann lost to Farmer, 2 & 1. Late in the year he played the Bakersfield Open Invitational. It was the second PGA Tour event he played that year. He opened with a 76 (+4) but responded with a 68 (−4), one of the rounds of the day, to move into a tie for 33rd. He went on to finish in a tie for 59th. During this era, when not playing in golf tournaments, Oppermann worked in the club shop of McLaren Golf Club in San Francisco. Oppermann also played out of McLaren Park during this era. He was known to practice every day.

In 1963 he would have much success. In the first week of the year he broke the course record at McLaren Park. Shortly thereafter he began play at the Hayward City Championships. He opened with a 73 (+1) to put him one back of the lead. In the second round he fired a "hot" 69 (−3), with six birdies, to remain one back of leader Ron Cerrudo. In the third round Cerrudo had a "disastrous" 79 (+7) and Oppermann took a one-stroke lead over John Lotz. In the final round it was Lotz who fell back, with a 77 (+5), while Oppermann closed with a 70 (−2) to win by four over Cerrudo. In March he played the three-round Alameda Commuters Championship, "one of the class medal play tournaments in Northern California." He was two behind Dick Lotz entering the final round. Late in the day he birdied the 14th and 15th holes to cut the lead to one. However, Lotz, playing behind, also birdied the par-5 15th hole to expand his lead. When Oppermann bogeyed the 16th hole "the match was history." Oppermann finished two back of Lotz in solo second. Two months later, in May, Oppermann shot a "sizzling" 66 at a qualifying round for the Northern California Amateur. It earned him medalist honors. He would go on to reach the finals of the match play event where he played John Lotz. He again lost to Lotz, losing to him 6 & 5.

In July 1963 he played the U.S. Amateur Public Links. Early in the tournament, he defeated Jack H. Omuro of Hawaii 3 & 1, shooting one-under-par for the tournament. In the following round, the quarterfinals, he defeated Ed Castagnetto Jr., also of San Francisco, 4 & 3. In the semifinals he played Dante C. Vinici, a glass company worker from Ottawa, Illinois, the tournament's "upset king." Oppermann was the overwhelming favorite. Oppermann and Vicini tied the first eight holes. Vicini played poorly around the greens on the 9th and 10th giving Oppermann a 2 up lead. For the remainder of the back nine both players played erratically, with a number of birdies and bogeys, and Oppermann's lead remained 2 up. Early during the afternoon's front nine Oppermann expanded his lead to 3 up. However, Vicini then produced a "blistering rally," winning three out of five holes, to cut the deficit to 1 up after 27 holes. According to a journalist, "it appeared he was going to pull off" another upset victory. Oppermann, however, blew open this "tight match" with birdies on the 11th and 12th holes. The match ended on the 15th as Vicini missed a 3-foot par putt. Oppermann won 4 & 3. "I just wore out," Vicini said after the match. "I've never played anybody who hits finer golf shots than this kid." Oppermann played Bob Lunn in the finals. Though they played in the same golfing circles in San Francisco they had never competed against each other in match play before. According to the San Francisco Examiner, Oppermann was regarded as the "slight favorite." In the beginning of the match, Oppermann bogeyed the second hole to quickly fall behind. Oppermann then birdied the 7th to square the match but Lunn made a three-footer on the 9th to regain the lead. On the back nine Oppermann made three bogeys; he was 2 down entering the final 18 holes. The afternoon's front nine was a "give and take struggle" between the two men with a number of birdies and bogeys between both players. Lunn wound up with a 3 up lead entering the final nine. On the inward half Oppermann produced a "desperate rally." He had par saves on the 11th and 13th and "made a desperation 12 footer" for another par save on the 14th. On the 15th hole Lunn missed a four-footer for par. Oppermann was suddenly only one back. On the 16th hole, and 34th hole of the match, Oppermann made another 12-foot par putt to tie the hole. On the 17th hole Oppermann hit his approach into the wrong fairway but managed another "hard won par" to remain one down. On the final hole, however, Oppermann only managed to hit the fringe with his approach and could not make birdie. Lunn lagged his birdie putt to three feet and made the par putt for the win. Despite the close finish, Oppermann never held the lead in the entire match.

In early August he began play at the Northern California Medal Play Championship at Stanford Golf Course. He opened well, birdieing the 1st and 3rd holes on his way to a 70 (−1). Among the 184 competitors, he was only one of two players to break par. He was tied for the lead with William Ward III. In the second round he shot a 72 (+1) to take a two-stroke lead over George Archer. The final two rounds were played over one day, Sunday August 4. Oppermann opened the third round well with a birdie and then nearly holed out his approach to the par-5 7th hole. The eagle helped him shoot a front nine 33 (−3). He ultimately shot a 69 (−2) to take a five-stroke lead over Dan James. In the final round he again opened well with birdies on the 3rd and 4th holes. Oppermann closed with a birdie on the 18th for a 67 (−4). He ultimately won by nine shots over Harvey Kohs. His margin of victory was "the largest ever posted in the long history of northern California medal play." His aggregate 278 (−6) was believed to be a course record at Stanford Golf Course for a four-round tournament. By now he was considered "one of the most talented amateurs in the West." Some considered him "one of the top 20 amateurs in the nation."

Oppermann's good play at the US Public Links gave him automatic entry into a U.S. Amateur qualifier. In late August he played the Northern California qualifier at California Golf Club. He was expected to earn one of the six berths designated at the qualifier. The prediction was right as Oppermann shots rounds of 71-72 at the event, the only player under-par, to earn medalist honors over Tom Culligan Jr. by a shot. A few days later he played the California State Fair Amateur Golf Championship. In the first round he fired a "disappointing" 73 (+1), with no birdies, putting him five behind leader George Archer. In the second round he "bounced back" with a 69 (−3) to "stay in contention." He shot a final round 70 (−2) to finish in a tie for fourth place but was, in the words of a journalist, "unhappy" with the result. The following week he played the U.S. Amateur in Des Moines, Iowa. He lost in the first round to Lawrence Bell of Allentown, Pennsylvania 6 & 4.

In early 1964, Oppermann had difficulties with his swing, "pushing the ball with his arms and turning his shoulders on the downswing." His coach, Virgil Shreeve, was ill and unable to help him. As a result, Oppermann's performances in golf tournaments were generally poor during this timeframe. On January 5 he began play at the Hayward City Championship. The four-round tournament was held over the course of the month, played on the weekends. Oppermann was "the pre-tournament favorite." He played poorly on the greens in the first round, however, and shot a 75 (+3). A few days later he attempted to qualify for the Lucky International Open, the annual PGA Tour stop in San Francisco. Oppermann was considered "a near cinch" to qualify. However, he shot a 77 (+5) in the qualifying round, tying for the final spot allocated to qualifiers. He lost a playoff for the final spot. The following week he returned to Hayward and played better. With a second round 67 (−5) he was able to "assume his rightful pew" atop the leaderboard and take a one-stroke lead over Ron Cerrudo. The third and fourth rounds were played over a single day, Sunday January 19. In the third round he shot a 70 (−2) to maintain his one-stroke lead over Cerrudo. The "weather got nastier," however, and "Cerrudo got stronger" as the day went on. He outshot Oppermann by four in the final round, 68 to 72, to win by three. A few weeks later, in February, he played the San Francisco City Golf Open. He won his first round match. However, "he fumbled through" the rest of the tournament and did not post a notable result.

Oppermann had much more success later in 1964. In March, his coach Shreeve recovered from his illness and was able to fix the swing problems. In April Oppermann opened well at the Oakland City Golf championship shooting a 69 (−3), positioning himself in a tie for third, two back of Ron Cerrudo's lead. He shot a second round 70 (−2) to move into a tie for second, though now five back of Cerrudo. In the third and final round he seriously challenged Cerrudo. He shot a 31 (−5) on the front nine and then birdied the 10th hole to get within one. Oppermann played well thereafter, shooting two-under-par over the final eight holes, but Cerrudo's back nine 33 (−3) was enough to "pull away." Cerrudo defeated Oppermann by two. Though Oppermann did not win his 64 (−8) set the course record and good enough for solo second, seven better than the remainder of the field. In May he played the Western Amateur in Tucson, Arizona. He won his early matches and met Ron Drimak in the quarterfinals. Oppermann defeated him 3 & 2 to move onto the semifinals. In the semifinals he faced Dave Leon, the defending Air Force amateur champion. Oppermann won the match to move onto the finals. He won the finals to win the event. In June he entered a local qualifier for the 1964 U.S. Open at Del Rio Country Club in Modesto, California. Oppermann shot rounds of 72 and 69 to earn medallist honors. The sectional qualifier was held a month later, also at Del Rio. In their preparation for the tournament, the San Francisco Examiner stated that the "spotlight" was on Oppermann, who was expected to get one of the four berths allocated. However, Oppermann's scores "soared" in the two-round qualifier. He finished at 157 (+13) and he missed qualifying by nine shots. On June 20 he began play at a sectional qualifier for the U.S. Amateur Public Links. The two-round qualifier was played at Harding Park Golf Club in San Francisco. There were four berths available. Oppermann shot an even-par 72 to tie Steve Whitman for the first round lead. Both he and Whitman shot second rounds of 74 (+2) and lost medalist honors to San Francisco fireman John Steddin by one shot. Despite this, Oppermann earned one of the four berths available.

The following week he began play at the California State Amateur Championship. Oppermann and Ron Cerrudo were considered the favorites. Oppermann won his first round match over John Richardson of Long Beach, California, 1 up. In the second round match he played Harold Casriel of Arcadia, California. Oppermann took the lead on the 8th hole and "never lost command after that." He won 4 & 2 while shooting two-under par in the process. "This is my best round ever at Pebble Beach," he said after the match. He and Cerrudo remained favorites to win the event. In the third round he was slated to play Bobby Roos. Oppermann was not optimistic about his chances. "That Roos can beat you with his putter," he said after his match. "I was hoping he would get beat so I wouldn't have to beat him." However, Oppermann defeated Roos and eventually made it to the semifinals. In that round he played Dr. Don Keith, a dentist from San Diego. The semifinal matches were 36 holes long. Oppermann birdied the 2nd and 4th holes on the way to a 4 up lead after 10 holes. The remainder of the back nine was a back-and-forth affair with Oppermann ultimately holding a 3 up lead at lunch. By the 4th hole of the afternoon round, Oppermann had a 5 up lead. Keith, however, then won three straight holes, from the 5th to 7th, to reduce the lead to 2 up. Oppermann, however, won three holes around the turn to push the lead back to 5 up. Oppermann eventually won it, 4 & 3. In the finals he played Guy Bill. The finals were also 36 holes long. Both players traded the lead in the morning round. After 16 holes Bill had a 2 up lead but "got careless" on the 17th, hitting his tee shot out of bounds, and then bogeyed the 18th to fall into a tie. Oppermann played poorly on the afternoon's front nine and was 2 down with nine holes left. He was playing so badly that, he later stated, he wanted to "get off the course and go home." Oppermann, however, played better during the afternoon's back nine, winning the 12th and 15th holes to square the match. Then on the par-3 17th hole, like he did in the morning round, Bill hit his tee shot out of bounds. He made bogey and Oppermann now had a 1 up lead. It was the first time Oppermann had the lead in the entire match. On the 18th hole Oppermann had a two-foot par putt to win. However, he missed the putt and match went into extra holes. The first extra hole was played on the par-4 1st hole. Bill played the hole poorly, with a pulled drive and approach that hit a cypress tree and barely advanced. He managed to get his third shot to 10 feet, however. Meanwhile, Oppermann made the green in regulation and hit his 30-foot birdie putt with tap-in range for a "routine par." Bill was unable to make his par putt and Oppermann won. With his Western Amateur triumph, it was Oppermann's second straight victory in a "blue ribbon" amateur event.

In July 1964 he began preparations to play in the U.S. Amateur Public Links, the event he nearly won the year before. The event was held at Gross National Golf Club in Saint Anthony, Minnesota. Before Oppermann had even qualified for the event he was given 2-1 odds to win the tournament. At the qualifier, playing against 166 competitors, Oppermann shot an even-par 70 to position himself in a tie for third. In the second round he shot a 65 to earn medallist honors by six strokes. He won by six shots over George Welch. He was only one off the Publinx's record for qualifiers. In addition, he was only one off of Gross National's course record. After the round, however, Oppermann predicted, "There will be a lot of upsets." He said, "There is no trouble on this course. A fellow could play good golf, hitting every green, and still lose to a hacker." In the first round he played Jim Carlson, a sophomore at the University of Minnesota. Oppermann was the overwhelming favorite. Things went as expected on the front nine as Oppermann took a 2 up lead at the turn. However, Carlson birdied the 11th and 15th holes to tie. On the par-3 17th hole, Oppermann hit his approach in a bunker and bogeyed. Oppermann was now 1 down with one hole to play. On the 18th hole, however, Carlson played every sequence of the hole poorly. He ultimately made double-bogey to lose the hole. Carlson and Oppermann went into extra holes. On the 19th hole, played on the 1st hole, both players hit their drives into the right rough and then missed the green. For their third shots, Oppermann hit his chip to 12 feet while Carlson "rolled a beautiful lag putt" from the fringe to three feet. Oppermann missed his putt while Carlson made his putt for the win. It was considered a "startling upset."

== Professional career ==
In late July 1964, Oppermann turned pro. Oppermann's first professional tournament was the Western Open played in August. He joined the PGA Tour in 1965. In April 1965 he received extensive media attention for one of the first times as a professional at the Texas Open. It was Oppermann's fifth tournament as a pro. Oppermann opened with rounds of 68 and 71 to make the cut. In the third round he shot a back nine of 29 (−6) to move into contention. His 65 (−5) was the best round of his tour career so far. It put him in a tie for sixth, four back of the lead. In the final round he shot a 70 (E) to finish in a tie for third, four back. It would be his best finish of the year. In May he played the 500 Festival Open Invitation in Indianapolis, Indiana. He received some media attention during Sunday's final round. Oppermann overslept which caused him to be late for his tee time. He subsequently was disqualified. The following week he played the 1965 U.S. Open. He shot rounds of 72 and 77 to make the cut. In the third round he shot a 73 (+3) for a 222 (+12) total. Oppermann was impressed with his performance. "I was just trying to make the halfway cut," he told the San Francisco Examiner after the round. "I'm surprised I'm scoring this well, playing the way I am. I think I can do better." Oppermann scored slightly better in the final round, shooting an even-par 70, to finish at 292 (+12), in solo 15th place. In late October he opened excellently at the Almaden Open with a 65 (−7). It tied the course record and gave him the first round lead with Al Geiberger. In the second round, however, he "fell back" with a 74 (+2), into a tie for fifteenth. He failed to break par for the remainder of the tournament and finished T-30. Oppermann played one more tournament in 1965, the Cajun Classic Open Invitational. He finished T-25, his third top 25 of the year. Overall, Oppermann made the cut and completed 11 of the 17 events he played. He earned $7,030 for the season.

In early 1966 he played the Los Angeles Open. In the first round he received much media attention. On the back nine − which he played first − Oppermann made two 15-foot birdie putts on the way to a 31 (−4). Despite a number of mistakes on his second nine he still managed to make all pars for a 67 (−4) and the joint lead with Dave Ragan. However, he shot a second round 78 (+7) to fall out of contention. He would go on to finish in a tie for nineteenth. The following month he received some media attention for a hole-in-one at the Tucson Open Invitational during the final round. He finished in a tie for 26th place. Later in the year he played the 1966 Masters Tournament. He opened well with rounds of 74-74-73 to put him at 221 (+5), in a tie for thirteenth, five back of the lead shared by Tommy Jacobs and Jack Nicklaus. However, he shot a final round 84 (+12) to finish T-50. In August he played the Insurance City Open Invitational in Hartford, Connecticut. He opened with rounds of 71 and 69 to make the cut. In the third round he shot a 64 (−7) to move into a tie for sixth. He told the media later that it was "his best round ever." He shot a final round 71 (E) to finish T-16. He played in six more official events for the remainder of the year, making the cut in all of them, recording two top-15 finishes. One of these high finishes was a tie for twelfth at the Portland Open Invitational. It was his best finish of the year. Overall, he made the cut in 22 of 24 events for the year with seven top-25s.

In early 1967 he received media attention for his performance on the West Coast swing. He shot an opening round 71 at the Crosby Clambake to place in the top ten, three back of the lead held by Joe Carr. The following round he shot a 73 (+1) at Spyglass Hill Golf Course. Though a higher score it moved him into joint second, two behind leader Jack Nicklaus. His third round was played at Pebble Beach Golf Links. He did not play as well, scoring one double-bogey, three bogeys, and one birdie through the first 16 holes. He then bogeyed the 17th hole and hit his 18th hole drive into the ocean. It led to another bogey. After the round he stated, "Seventy-eight. That's about how I shoot this course. What's my best here? That's it, 78. I can't play this course." The final round was again at Pebble Beach. Oppermann shot a 75 (+3) and finished in a tie for 21st. He following week he played the Los Angeles Open. Like the previous year, he was briefly in contention. He opened with rounds of 72-70 to make the cut at even-par. In the third round he shot a 66 (−5), equaling the best of the day, to move into a tie for fifth. However, he shot a final round 76 (+5) to fall into a tie for 33rd. In June he played the Cleveland Open Invitational. In the first round he shot a 75 (+5) to put himself well back of the lead. However, he did an "about-face" in the second round, shooting a "blistering" 65 (−5), including birdies on five of the last ten holes. He was the "most improved" golfer in the second round. He tied Aurora Country Club's course record with Homero Blancas who also had a 65 that round. However, he played poorly in the final two rounds, shooting fourteen over-par on the weekend, to finish T-65. In August he played well at the beginning of the Western Open. Taking only 26 putts, he opened with a 67 (−4) leaving him only one behind. He shot a second round 71 (E) and fell to joint sixth place. He shot a third round 69 (−2) to move into a tie for fifth, three back of the lead. In the final round he shot 71 (E) to finish at 278, in a tie for third. Later in the month he seriously contended for the Greater Hartford Open. In the final round, he was significantly under-par for most of the day to get into contention. By the middle of the back nine he had the solo lead. However, Charlie Sifford eagled the par-5 14th hole to tie. On the 16th hole Oppermann had a chance to regain the solo lead again but was unable to take advantage of a good drive. On the 215-yard, par-3 17th hole Oppermann missed the green and made bogey while Sifford, playing earlier, made a "decisive par." Oppermann finished with a 67 (−4) for a 273 (−11) total, one behind Sifford. Though he did not win Oppermann defeated a number of star golfers, including Raymond Floyd and Gary Player by one stroke and Kel Nagle by two strokes. It was his hitherto best finish on the PGA Tour. He earned $12,000. Later in the year, in October, he had success at the Sahara Invitational. He shot a third round 66 (−5) to leap up the leaderboard into a tie for fifth. He shot a final round 72 (+1) to finish in a tie for 11th place.

In the winter of 1967-68 he had "bout of hepatitis." However, he managed to return to the PGA Tour by February. Late in the month he received attention for his play at the Tucson Open. He eagled the par-5 2nd hole on his way to a 68 (−4) and the clubhouse lead. By the end of the day he was in a tie for third, three back. However, he ultimately withdrew after a third round 77 (+5). The following month he closed well at the Pensacola Open, with a final round 67 (−5), to finish in the top ten. In May he seriously contended at Champions International Golf Tournament in Houston. In the second round he scored seven birdies for a 67 (−4), the round of the day, to move into a tie for fifth. He shot over-par the final two days, however, to finish T-11. For the remainder of the year he made the cut in 8 of 13 events with four top-25s.

Late in the year he played some events on the Caribbean Tour, a satellite tour in Latin America operated by the PGA Tour. He finished in the top-10 in his first two events, the Caracas General Motors Open and the West End Classic. Early in 1969 he played the Ford Maracaibo Open in Maracaibo, Venezuela. He was several shots behind entering Sunday but shot a final round 67 (−5) to finish solo second, two behind champion Butch Baird. Roughly a month later he began playing on the PGA Tour again. In April, he shot a third round 69 (−3) at the Tallahassee Open, one of the rounds of the day, to move into the top ten. However, he shot a final round 76 (+4) to finish T-23. In May, he opened well at the Texas Open. His 69 (−2) put him in a tie for fourth, two back of the lead. He shot over-par for the remainder of the tournament, however, and finished T-35. Over the course of his next eight events, Oppermann made the cut in six of them but only recorded one top-25 and no top-10s. In early August he began played at the Indian Ridge Hospital Open Invitational in Andover, Massachusetts. He opened with three rounds of the 60s to put him one behind leader Monty Kaser. In the final round he outplayed Kaser until late when his competitor birdied two of the last four holes for the win. Oppermann finished a 275 (−9) total, one behind Kaser. For the rest of the year Oppermann played in four events, making the cut in only one.

The 1970 season did not open well for Oppermann. He missed the cut in three of his first six events with no top-25s. In his seventh event, however, he managed to finish with back-to-back rounds in the 60s at the Cleveland Open Invitational to finish T-15. The next event he played was the Canadian Open. He opened with a 69 (−3) to place inside the top ten. However, he failed to break par for the remainder of the tournament and finished with a T-22. In August he competed at the Dow Jones Open Invitational, then the world's richest golf tournament. He opened with a 69 (−3) to put him near the lead. However, he floundered from there and eventually finished at 289 (+1), thirteen shots behind. Later in the summer he competed at the Greater Hartford Open. He opened with two rounds in the 60s to put him near the lead. In the third round he shot a 67 (−4) to move into solo second place. In the final round he shot an even-par 71 to finish solo fourth. For the remainder of the year he played in six more events, making the cut in five but with no high finishes, failing to record any top-25s. Oppermann lived in Newark, California during this era.

In 1971 Oppermann did not begin the year well. He missed the cut or withdrew from six of the first eight events. He played better during the first round of his ninth event, IVB-Philadelphia Golf Classic. Oppermann opened with a 68 (−4) to put him in a tie for fifth. Mike Hill, Jack Nicklaus, Bob Rosburg, and Tom Weiskopf were the only players to score better. However, he failed to break par the rest of the tournament and finished outside the top-25. A month later Oppermann again opened well, this time at the Quad Cities Open. Against 120 competitors, Oppermann shot a 68 (−3) to position himself in a tie for third. However, like his performance in Philadelphia, he again played poorly in the final three rounds and finished outside the top 25. Overall, for the year Oppermann made the cut in 6 of 14 events with one top-25 and no top-tens.

In 1972, Oppermann did not play a PGA Tour event until May. In his first four events he made the cut in all four with one top-25. In June, Oppermann received media attention for his performance at the Western Open. In the opening round, he shot a two-under-par 69 to put him in a tie for third with Hale Irwin and Tom Weiskopf, one back of the lead held by Jim Jamieson and R. H. Sikes. In the second round Oppermann shot a 72 (+1) to fall to a tie for fifth, again with Irwin, now six back of Jamieson's lead. In the third round he shot a 70 (−1) to move back into a tie for third place. In the final round he shot an even-par 71 to fall into a tie for 11th. In his next four performances Oppermann made the cut in two with no notable finishes. In September he played the Robinson's Fall Golf Classic, again in Illinois. After an opening round 68 (−3) he was in a tie for fifth, two back of the lead held by Grier Jones. In the second round he a 69 (−2) to move into a tie for second, one back. He shot slightly over-par the following two rounds, however, to finish T-22. The following week he played the Quad Cities Open, his last PGA Tour event of the year. He finished T-54. Overall, for the year Oppermann made the cut in 9 of 11 events with no top-tens and three top-25s. He earned $6,595 for the season. During this era, Oppermann continued to live in northern California.

Shortly after the PGA Tour season ended, he played the California State Open. The event was held at Pasatiempo Golf Course in Santa Cruz. Oppermann entered the final round at 212 (−1), two behind leader Alan Tapie. Tapie, however, triple-bogeyed the par-3 third hole and began to fall from contention. Tapie's playing partner, Jim Beetham, meanwhile took the lead with an eagle-par-par start. Oppermann, however, "took charge" with a birdie at the 4th hole. Beetham then bogeyed the 4th hole; Oppermann now had the solo lead. Oppermann then eagled the par-5 515-yard 6th hole to turn the tournament into a "near runaway." On the back nine, Oppermann continued his "consistent play" but bogeyed the 15th and 16th holes to give "a small ray of hope to Beetham." However, Oppermann made pars on the last two holes to close the deal. Oppermann finished at two-under-par 282, the only person under-par for the tournament. He won by five over Beetham and Dick McClean.

In 1973 Oppermann did not receive much media attention. He played in eight PGA Tour events, making the cut in only three of them, failing to record any top-25s. He earned $1,671 for the season. Oppermann "dropped off" tour after the 1973 season.

Shortly thereafter, he moved to Longwood, Florida. Though he no longer played on tour, Oppermann still intermittently played in notable tournament in the state. In November 1977 he played the two-round Sheoah Open on the Florida PGA Winter Tour. He shot four-under par 140 over the course of regulation play and then defeated Denny Lyons in a playoff for the victory. In January 1978 he played the PGA National Match Play Championship. He won his first round match against Jay Horton 3 & 2. However, he lost in the second round to Jim Albus, a club pro from New York, 3 & 2. In 1986 he played in his final PGA Tour tournament, the Tallahassee Open. In 1988 he played the Centennial Pro-am Golf Tournament at Harbor City Golf Course in Melbourne, Florida. In the first round he shot a 67 (−5), birdieing five holes on his back nine, to take a one-stroke lead over Scott Gump and Steve LaMontagne. In the second and final round he shot a 70 (−2) for a 137 total (−7), good enough for solo third. The following year he played well at the Florida Open and was near the top ten after the first round. During this era, he was a club professional at Melbourne Municipal Golf Course.

In the early 1990s he remained at Melbourne Municipal. In 1994 he played the three-round North Florida PGA Senior Golf Championship in Titusville, Florida. He opened with 76 (+5) to put him 10 shots behind the lead. "I actually didn't play that poorly in the first round," Oppermann said later. "I just started bad." In the second round he played much better with a 68 (−3), the round of the day, putting him in solo fourth, four back. In the third and final round he shot a 72 (+1). He finished six shots out of a playoff but won the 50-54 age group. By 1997, he had retired to Pine Mountain, Georgia.

== Personal life ==
Oppermann is married to Peggy Livingston. They have two children, Christy Oppermann and Steven M. Oppermann. In his youth, his son had much success at junior events. As a student, Steven M. represented Melbourne High School in Florida and was medalist at several events. In 1993 he led Melbourne High to an undefeated record through its first 13 matches while winning its conference.

== Amateur wins ==
- 1959 Jaycee Tournament (California branch)
- 1963 Northern California Medal Play Championship
- 1964 Western Amateur, California State Amateur Championship

== Professional wins (4) ==
- 1960 Blossom Festival Open
- 1963 Hayward City Championships
- 1972 California State Open
- 1977 Sheoah Open

== Results in major championships ==
Tournament	1965	1966	1967
Masters Tournament		T50	
U.S. Open	15	T48	T48
