= National Team Championship =

Golf tournament formerly on the PGA Tour

Tournament information
- Location: Ligonier, Pennsylvania
- Established: 1965
- Course: Laurel Valley Golf Club
- Par: 71
- Tour: PGA Tour
- Format: Team stroke play
- Prize fund: US$200,000
- Month played: July
- Final year: 1972

Tournament record score
- Aggregate: 256 Jack Nicklaus and Arnold Palmer (1966)
- To par: −32 as above

Final champion
- (United States) Babe Hiskey and (United States) Kermit Zarley
- Location in the United States Location in Pennsylvania

The National Team Championship, which was played under a variety of names, was a team golf tournament played from 1965 to 1972. It was an official PGA Tour event from 1968 to 1972.

== Tournament hosts ==
- 1965–1966 PGA National Golf Club, Palm Beach Gardens, Florida
- 1968 Quail Creek Golf & Country Club and Twin Hills Golf & Country Club, Oklahoma City, Oklahoma
- 1970–1972 Laurel Valley Golf Club, Ligonier, Pennsylvania (an 18-hole, par-71 championship course that opened in 1959, and was originally designed by Dick Wilson.)

== Winners ==
Year	Tour (Note: PGAT − PGA Tour.)	Winner	Score	To par	Margin of victory	Runners-up
National Team Championship
1972	PGAT	(United States) Babe Hiskey and (United States) Kermit Zarley	262	−22	3 strokes	(United States) Grier Jones and (United States) Johnny Miller
1971	PGAT	(United States) Jack Nicklaus (3) and (United States) Arnold Palmer (3)	257	−27	6 strokes	(United States) Julius Boros and (United States) Bill Collins (New Zealand) Bob Charles and (Australia) Bruce Devlin
National Four-Ball Team Championship
1970	PGAT	(United States) Jack Nicklaus (2) and (United States) Arnold Palmer (2)	259	−25	3 strokes	(United States) George Archer and (United States) Bobby Nichols (Australia) Bruce Crampton and (United States) Orville Moody (United States) Gardner Dickinson and (United States) Sam Snead
1969: No tournament
PGA National Team Championship
1968	PGAT	(United States) George Archer and (United States) Bobby Nichols	265	−22	2 strokes	(United States) Monty Kaser and (United States) Rives McBee
1967: No tournament
PGA Team Championship
1966		(United States) Jack Nicklaus and (United States) Arnold Palmer	256	−32	3 strokes	(United States) Al Besselink and (United States) Doug Sanders
PGA National Four-ball Championship
1965		(United States) Butch Baird and (United States) Gay Brewer	259	−29	3 strokes	(United States) Jay Hebert and (United States) Lionel Hebert
