= Steve Veriato =

American professional golfer (born 1946)

Personal information
- Nationality: United States
- Born: May 6, 1946 (age 80) Hilo, Hawaii, U.S.
- Height: 5 ft 9 in (1.75 m)
- Weight: 160 lb (73 kg; 11 st)

Career
- Sport: Golf
- College: Texas A&M University
- Turned professional: 1973
- Former tours: PGA Tour; Asian Tour; Canadian Tour; Champions Tour
- Professional wins: 6

Number of wins by tour
- PGA Tour Champions: 1
- Other: 5

Best results in major championships
- Masters Tournament: DNP
- PGA Championship: T76: 1992
- U.S. Open: CUT: 1979, 1988
- The Open Championship: DNP

Steve Veriato (born May 6, 1946) is an American professional golfer. He played on the PGA Tour, Asia Golf Circuit, Canadian Tour, and Champions Tour where he won once.

== Early life and amateur career ==
Veriato was born in Hilo, Hawaii. He played college golf at Texas A&M University.

== Professional career ==
In 1973, Veriato turned professional. Veriato played on the PGA Tour from 1976 to 1980. His best ever finish was a solo 2nd at the 1977 Atlanta Classic. He was then primarily a club pro in Texas for 14 years. Concurrent with his experience as a club pro, however, he also occasionally played on some minor international circuits. He played the Canadian Tour in 1988 and 1989 and the Asia Golf Circuit in 1975, 1988, 1989, and 1995. He joined the Senior PGA Tour after he turned 50. In 2001, he won the 2001 Novell Utah Showdown.

== Professional wins (6) ==
=== Regular career wins (5) ===
- 1976 Hawaii State Open
- 1977 Hawaii State Open
- 1987 Southern Texas PGA Championship
- 1988 Southern Texas PGA Championship
- 1994 Southern Texas PGA Championship

=== Champions Tour wins (1) ===
No.	Date	Tournament	Winning score	Margin of victory	Runners-up
1	Aug 19, 2001	Novell Utah Showdown	−12 (68-68-68=204)	1 stroke	(United States) Bruce Lietzke, (Australia) Graham Marsh, (United States) Jerry Pate, (United States) Jesse Patino

== Playoff record ==
Asia Golf Circuit playoff record (0–1)

No.	Year	Tournament	Opponent	Result
1	1995	Thai Airways Thailand Open	(United States) Todd Hamilton	Lost to par on second extra hole

== U.S. national team appearances ==
- PGA Cup: 1992 (winners)

== See also ==
- Fall 1975 PGA Tour Qualifying School graduates
