= Hawaii State Open =

The Hawaii State Open is the Hawaii state open golf tournament, open to both amateur and professional golfers. It is organized by the Aloha section of the PGA of America. It was revived from an earlier event that evolved into the PGA Tour's Sony Open in Hawaii. It has been played annually since 1974 at a variety of courses around the state.

== Winners ==
- 2023 John Oda
- 2018–2022 No tournament
- 2017 Tadd Fujikawa
- 2016 T.J. Kua
- 2015 Nick Mason
- 2014 Dean Wilson
- 2013 Nick Mason
- 2012 Dean Wilson
- 2011 Samuel Cyr
- 2010 Tadd Fujikawa
- 2009 Jesse Mueller
- 2008 Nick Mason
- 2007 Dean Wilson
- 2006 Tom Eubank
- 2005 Jarett Hamamoto (amateur)
- 2004 Chad Saladin
- 2003 Kris Moe
- 2002 Tom Eubank
- 2001 Kevin Hayashi
- 2000 Kevin Hayashi
- 1999 Kevin Hayashi
- 1998 Gregory Meyer
- 1997 Brian Sasada
- 1996 Deron Doi
- 1995 Ken Springer
- 1994 Scott Simpson
- 1993 Scott Simpson
- 1992 Lance Suzuki
- 1991 Dick McClean
- 1990 Dick McClean
- 1989 Chuck Davis
- 1988 Lance Suzuki
- 1987 Casey Nakama
- 1986 Lance Suzuki
- 1985 David Ishii
- 1984 David Ishii
- 1983 Clyde Rego
- 1982 Wendell Tom (amateur)
- 1981 Scott Simpson
- 1980 David Ishii
- 1979 Scott Simpson
- 1978 Steve Veriato
- 1977 Steve Veriato
- 1976 Lance Suzuki
- 1975 Allan Yamamoto (amateur)
- 1974 Dan Nishimoto (amateur)
