= Dean Wilson (golfer) =

American professional golfer (born 1969)

Personal information
- Full name: Dean Hiroshi Wilson
- Nationality: United States
- Born: December 17, 1969 (age 56) Kaneohe, Hawaii, U.S.
- Height: 6 ft 0 in (1.83 m)
- Weight: 175 lb (79 kg; 12.5 st)

Career
- Sport: Golf
- College: Brigham Young University
- Turned professional: 1992
- Former tours: PGA Tour; Japan Golf Tour; Asia Golf Circuit
- Professional wins: 12
- Highest ranking: 53 (July 14, 2002)

Number of wins by tour
- PGA Tour: 1
- Japan Golf Tour: 6
- Other: 5

Best results in major championships
- Masters Tournament: T30: 2007
- PGA Championship: T29: 2006
- U.S. Open: T30: 2001
- The Open Championship: CUT: 2001, 2002

Achievements and awards
- Asia Golf Circuit Rookie of the Year: 1996–97
- Japan Golf Tour Rookie of the Year: 2000

Dean Hiroshi Wilson (born December 17, 1969) is an American professional golfer.

== Career ==
Wilson was born in Kaneohe, Hawaii. He turned professional in 1992 after graduating from Brigham Young University and has won six times on the Japan Golf Tour and once on the PGA Tour. After a poor 2009 season Wilson lost his PGA Tour playing rights. He regained full tour status in 2010 while starting outside top 150 from previous year's money list. Wilson has not played a full season since 2011.

== Professional wins (12) ==
=== PGA Tour wins (1) ===
No.	Date	Tournament	Winning score	Margin of victory	Runner-up
1	Aug 13, 2006	The International	34 pts (2-11-9-12=34)	Playoff	(United States) Tom Lehman

PGA Tour playoff record (1–0)

No.	Year	Tournament	Opponent	Result
1	2006	The International	(United States) Tom Lehman	Won with birdie on second extra hole

=== Japan Golf Tour wins (6) ===
Legend
Japan majors (1)
Other Japan Golf Tour (5)

No.	Date	Tournament	Winning score	Margin of victory	Runner-up
1	Jul 16, 2000	Aiful Cup	−14 (67-69-69-66=271)	1 stroke	(Japan) Eiji Mizoguchi
2	May 13, 2001	Japan PGA Championship	−3 (68-68-71-74=281)	4 strokes	(Japan) Hideki Kase
3	Sep 2, 2001	Japan PGA Match-Play Championship Promise Cup	2 and 1		(Taiwan) Lin Keng-chi
4	Nov 4, 2001	Ube Kosan Open	−21 (65-67-68-67=267)	1 stroke	(Japan) Taichi Teshima
5	Apr 28, 2002	Tsuruya Open	−11 (69-67-69-68=273)	2 strokes	(Japan) Toru Taniguchi
6	Jun 30, 2002	Gateway to The Open Mizuno Open	−11 (71-69-70-67=277)	1 stroke	(Japan) Kiyoshi Miyazato

=== Other wins (5) ===
- 1999 Alaska State Open, Utah Open
- 2007 Hawaii State Open
- 2012 Hawaii State Open
- 2014 Hawaii State Open

== Results in major championships ==
Tournament	2001	2002	2003	2004	2005	2006	2007	2008
Masters Tournament							T30	
U.S. Open	T30		CUT			CUT	T51	CUT
The Open Championship	CUT	CUT						
PGA Championship		CUT	CUT			T29	CUT	T47

Did not play

CUT = missed the half-way cut
"T" = tied

== Results in The Players Championship ==
Tournament	2004	2005	2006	2007	2008	2009	2010	2011
The Players Championship	CUT		CUT	CUT	T10	CUT		CUT

Top 10
Did not play

CUT = missed the halfway cut
"T" indicates a tie for a place

== Results in World Golf Championships ==
Tournament	2006	2007
Match Play		
Championship	T22	T16
Invitational	T45	

Did not play

"T" = Tied

== See also ==
- 2002 PGA Tour Qualifying School graduates
- 2004 PGA Tour Qualifying School graduates
