= Southern Texas PGA Championship =

The Southern Texas PGA Championship is a golf tournament that is the championship of the Southern Texas section of the PGA of America. The Southern Texas section was formed in 1968, and the tournament has been played annually since that time. Tommy Aycock, who played in 51 PGA tournaments between 1970 and 1991, holds the record with six victories in this championship. Babe Hiskey (three-time PGA tour winner), Don Massengale (two-time PGA tour winner), and Butch Baird (two-time PGA tour winner) also have victories in this tournament.

== Winners ==
- 2026 Bret Gray
- 2025 Casey Russell
- 2024 Jared Jones
- 2023 Ben Willman
- 2022 Steve Jurgensen
- 2021 Ben Kern
- 2020 Gilbert Mendez
- 2019 Jared Jones
- 2018 Omar Uresti
- 2017 Jesse Droemer
- 2016 Casey Russell
- 2015 Omar Uresti
- 2014 Ryan Polzin
- 2013 David Von Hoffmann
- 2012 Clayton Wonnell
- 2011 Lonny Alexander
- 2010 Brad Lardon
- 2009 Tim Thelen
- 2008 Tim Thelen
- 2007 Lonny Alexander
- 2006 Brad Lardon
- 2005 David Lundstrom
- 2004 David Lundstrom
- 2003 David Lundstrom
- 2002 Robert Thompson
- 2001 Tim Thelen
- 2000 Robert Thompson
- 1999 Robert Thompson
- 1998 Ken Kelley
- 1997 Robert Thompson
- 1996 Matt Swanson
- 1995 Kirk Johnson
- 1994 Steve Veriato
- 1993 J. L. Lewis
- 1992 J. L. Lewis
- 1991 Tommy Aycock
- 1990 Brent Buckman
- 1989 Charlie Epps
- 1988 Steve Veriato
- 1987 Steve Veriato
- 1986 Robert Thompson
- 1985 Randy Petri
- 1984 Charlie Epps
- 1983 Babe Hiskey
- 1982 Frank Conner
- 1981 Tommy Aycock
- 1980 David Lundstrom
- 1979 Charlie Epps
- 1978 Frank Conner
- 1977 Bob Payne
- 1976 Tommy Aycock
- 1975 Don Massengale
- 1974 Tommy Aycock
- 1973 Tommy Aycock
- 1972 Earl Jacobsen
- 1971 Buddy Weaver
- 1970 Babe Hiskey
- 1969 Tommy Aycock
- 1968 Butch Baird
