= Indian Ridge Hospital Open Invitational =

1969 one-off PGA Tour tournament

Tournament information
- Location: Andover, Massachusetts
- Established: 1969
- Course: Indian Ridge Country Club
- Par: 71
- Tour: PGA Tour
- Format: Stroke play
- Prize fund: US$37,000
- Month played: August
- Final year: 1969

Tournament record score
- Aggregate: 274 Monty Kaser (1969)
- To par: −10 as above

Final champion
- (United States) Monty Kaser

Location map
- Location in the United States Location in Massachusetts

The Indian Ridge Hospital Open Invitational was a PGA Tour tournament.

== History ==
The event played for one year at the Indian Ridge Country Club in Andover, Massachusetts. It was played opposite the 1969 PGA Championship. The tournament was held in August 1969 and organized by Indian Ridge head club pro Ross Coon. It benefited the Children's Hospital of Boston.

The tournament was won by 27-year-old Monty Kaser of Wichita, Kansas by one stroke over Steve Oppermann.

== Winners ==
Year	Winner	Score	To par	Margin of victory	Runner-up
1969	(United States) Monty Kaser	274	−10	1 stroke	(United States) Steve Oppermann
