= Jim Wiechers =

American golfer

Personal information
- Full name: James Lawrence Wiechers
- Nationality: United States
- Born: August 7, 1944 Oakland, California, U.S.
- Died: October 15, 2018 (aged 74) Napa, California, U.S.
- Height: 6 ft 2 in (1.88 m)
- Weight: 205 lb (93 kg; 14.6 st)
- Spouse: Susan
- Children: Erica

Career
- Sport: Golf
- College: Santa Clara University
- Turned professional: 1966
- Former tour: PGA Tour
- Professional wins: 1

Number of wins by tour
- PGA Tour: 1

Best results in major championships
- Masters Tournament: CUT: 1976
- PGA Championship: T29: 1972
- U.S. Open: T14: 1975
- The Open Championship: DNP

James Lawrence Wiechers (August 7, 1944 – October 15, 2018) was an American professional golfer who played on the PGA Tour in the 1960s and 1970s.

== Early life ==
Wiechers was born in Oakland, California. He won the 1962 U.S. Junior Amateur while in high school.

== Amateur career ==
He then attended Santa Clara University and was a member of the golf team, winning first-team All-American honors in 1965. He collected many honors during his amateur career including Golf Digest's Number One U.S. Amateur award in 1966.

== Professional career ==
Wiechers turned professional and joined the PGA Tour in 1966. He played on the PGA Tour from 1966 to 1979. His best years were in the late 1960s through the mid-1970s when he finished on the top-60 money list five times. He won one PGA Tour event during his career: the 1969 West End Classic.

After leaving the tour, Wiechers first began working in California's Napa Valley wine industry in the 1980s. Then he returned to golf in the 1990s, first as head instructor at McCaffrey's Golf School in San Francisco, then as a teaching pro at Chardonnay Golf Club for 19 years, and finally at Eagle Vines Golf Club. He also coached the men's and women's golf teams at Napa Valley College.

== Death ==
Wiechers died on October 15, 2018, at Queen of the Valley Medical Center in Napa, California following a four-month-long illness.

== Amateur wins ==
- 1962 U.S. Junior Amateur
- 1964 Western Junior
- 1966 Western Amateur, Trans-Mississippi Amateur

== Professional wins (1) ==
=== PGA Tour wins (1) ===
No.	Date	Tournament	Winning score	Margin of victory	Runners-up
1	Dec 7, 1969	West End Classic	−11 (70-68-69-70=277)	2 strokes	(United States) Al Besselink, (United States) Johnny Pott

PGA Tour playoff record (0–1)

No.	Year	Tournament	Opponent	Result
1	1969	Robinson Open Golf Classic	(United States) Bob Goalby	Lost to birdie on first extra hole

== See also ==
- 1966 PGA Tour Qualifying School graduates
