= Scott Simpson (golfer) =

American professional golfer (born 1955)

Personal information
- Full name: Scott William Simpson
- Nationality: United States
- Born: September 17, 1955 (age 71) San Diego, California, U.S.
- Height: 6 ft 2 in (1.88 m)

Career
- Sport: Golf
- College: University of Southern California
- Turned professional: 1977
- Current tour: Champions Tour
- Former tour: PGA Tour
- Professional wins: 16
- Highest ranking: 11 (June 21, 1987)

Number of wins by tour
- PGA Tour: 7
- Japan Golf Tour: 3
- PGA Tour Champions: 1

Best results in major championships (wins: 1)
- Masters Tournament: T7: 1990
- PGA Championship: T6: 1984, 1993
- U.S. Open: Won: 1987
- The Open Championship: T9: 1993

Achievements and awards
- Haskins Award: 1977

Scott William Simpson (born September 17, 1955) is an American professional golfer.

== Amateur career ==
Simpson was born in San Diego, California, and played college golf at the University of Southern California, where he was two-time medalist at the NCAA Championship in 1976 and 1977. At the end of 1976 Golf Digest ranked Simpson the #1 amateur in the country.

== Professional career ==
He turned professional in 1977 and graduated in 1978. He played on the PGA Tour from 1979, and won seven PGA Tour events between 1980 and 1998.

The highlight of Simpson's career was the U.S. Open in 1987 at the Olympic Club in San Francisco, his only major title. He birdied the 14th, 15th, and 16th holes of the final round to overtake Tom Watson by one stroke and finished with a three under par total of 277.

Simpson became eligible to play senior golf in 2005 and won his first and only Champions Tour title in 2006.

In team competition, Simpson played for the United States in the Walker Cup in 1977 and the Ryder Cup in 1987. He lists bible study among his interests and attributes his success to it. He and his wife Cheryl have two children: Brea Yoshiko and Sean.

Simpson was previously a Democrat (during Bill Clinton's presidency he was the only PGA Tour player vocally to support him), but became a Republican later on and supported George W. Bush.

== Amateur wins ==
this list may be incomplete

- 1976 NCAA Division I Championship, Porter Cup
- 1977 NCAA Division I Championship

== Professional wins (16) ==
=== PGA Tour wins (7) ===
Legend
Major championships (1)
Other PGA Tour (6)

No.	Date	Tournament	Winning score	To par	Margin of victory	Runner(s)-up
1	Jul 6, 1980	Western Open	70-69-70-72=281	−7	5 strokes	(United States) Andy Bean
2	Jun 10, 1984	Manufacturers Hanover Westchester Classic	66-68-70-65=269	−15	5 strokes	(Australia) David Graham, (United States) Jay Haas, (United States) Mark O'Meara
3	Apr 5, 1987	Greater Greensboro Open	70-73-69-70=282	−6	2 strokes	(United States) Clarence Rose
4	Jun 21, 1987	U.S. Open	71-68-70-68=277	−3	1 stroke	(United States) Tom Watson
5	May 28, 1989	BellSouth Atlanta Golf Classic	72-68-71-67=278	−10	Playoff	(United States) Bob Tway
6	May 16, 1993	GTE Byron Nelson Golf Classic	65-66-68-71=270	−10	1 stroke	(United States) Billy Mayfair, (United States) Corey Pavin, (United States) D. A. Weibring
7	Feb 8, 1998	Buick Invitational	69-71-64=204 (Note: Shortened to 54 holes due to weather.)	−12	Playoff	(United States) Skip Kendall

PGA Tour playoff record (2–3)

No.	Year	Tournament	Opponent(s)	Result
1	1983	Kemper Open	(Taiwan) Chen Tze-chung, (United States) Fred Couples (United States) Barry Jaeckel, (United States) Gil Morgan	Couples won with birdie on second extra hole Jaeckel eliminated by par on first hole
2	1989	BellSouth Atlanta Golf Classic	(United States) Bob Tway	Won with par on first extra hole
3	1991	U.S. Open	(United States) Payne Stewart	Lost 18-hole playoff; Stewart: +3 (75), Simpson: +5 (77)
4	1994	Southwestern Bell Colonial	(Zimbabwe) Nick Price	Lost to birdie on first extra hole
5	1998	Buick Invitational	(United States) Skip Kendall	Won with birdie on first extra hole

=== PGA of Japan Tour wins (3) ===
No.	Date	Tournament	Winning score	To par	Margin of victory	Runner(s)-up
1	Apr 29, 1984	Chunichi Crowns	68-73-67-67=275	−5	Playoff	(Japan) Isao Aoki
2	Nov 18, 1984	Dunlop Phoenix Tournament	71-71-72-68=282	−6	Playoff	(West Germany) Bernhard Langer
3	May 1, 1988	The Crowns (2)	71-69-71-67=278	−2	3 strokes	(United States) David Ishii, (Japan) Masashi Ozaki

PGA of Japan Tour playoff record (2–0)

No.	Year	Tournament	Opponent	Result
1	1984	Chunichi Crowns	(Japan) Isao Aoki	Won with par on first extra hole
2	1984	Dunlop Phoenix Tournament	(West Germany) Bernhard Langer	Won with par on second extra hole

=== Other wins (5) ===
- 1979 Hawaii State Open
- 1981 Hawaii State Open
- 1990 Perrier Invitational (Europe, not a European Tour event)
- 1993 Hawaii State Open
- 1994 Hawaii State Open

=== Champions Tour wins (1) ===
No.	Date	Tournament	Winning score	To par	Margin of victory	Runners-up
1	Sep 3, 2006	Wal-Mart First Tee Open at Pebble Beach	67-69-68=204	−12	1 stroke	(United States) David Edwards, (United States) Jay Haas

== Major championships ==
=== Wins (1) ===
Year	Championship	54 holes	Winning score	Margin	Runner-up
1987	U.S. Open	1 shot deficit	−3 (71-68-70-68=277)	1 stroke	(United States) Tom Watson

=== Results timeline ===
Tournament	1980	1981	1982	1983	1984	1985	1986	1987	1988	1989
Masters Tournament		CUT		11	40	T41	T25	T27	CUT	T38
U.S. Open	T45	T23	T15	T13	T25	T15	CUT	1	T6	T6
The Open Championship							T65	T62		T26
PGA Championship	T30	CUT	T32	T9	T6	T12	T41	T47	CUT	T53

Tournament	1990	1991	1992	1993	1994	1995	1996	1997	1998
Masters Tournament	T7	T22	T13	T11	T27		T29		CUT
U.S. Open	T14	2	T64	T46	T55	T28	T40	CUT	58
The Open Championship	T39	T57		T9	CUT	CUT	T33		
PGA Championship	T66	CUT		T6	CUT	T54	CUT		CUT

Win
Top 10
Did not play

CUT = missed the halfway cut
"T" indicates a tie for a place.

=== Summary ===
Tournament	Wins	2nd	3rd	Top-5	Top-10	Top-25	Events	Cuts made
Masters Tournament	0	0	0	0	1	6	15	12
U.S. Open	1	1	0	2	4	10	19	17
The Open Championship	0	0	0	0	1	1	9	7
PGA Championship	0	0	0	0	3	4	17	11
Totals	1	1	0	2	9	21	60	47

- Most consecutive cuts made – 12 (1982 U.S. Open – 1986 Masters)
- Longest streak of top-10s – 2 (1993 Open Championship – 1993 PGA)

== Results in The Players Championship ==
Tournament	1979	1980	1981	1982	1983	1984	1985	1986	1987	1988	1989
The Players Championship	CUT	T51	CUT	T2	T61	T33	T33	CUT	T4	CUT	CUT

Tournament	1990	1991	1992	1993	1994	1995	1996	1997	1998	1999	2000	2001	2002
The Players Championship	CUT		T17	CUT	CUT	T11	CUT	CUT	CUT	CUT			T63

Top 10
Did not play

CUT = missed the halfway cut
"T" indicates a tie for a place

== U.S. national team appearances ==
Amateur

- Walker Cup: 1977 (winners)

Professional

- Ryder Cup: 1987
- Kirin Cup: 1987 (winners)

== See also ==
- Fall 1978 PGA Tour Qualifying School graduates
