= Danny Thomas-Diplomat Classic =

Golf tournament formerly on the PGA Tour

Coordinates: 25.99°N 80.13°W

Tournament information
- Location: Hallandale, Florida
- Established: 1969
- Course: Diplomat Presidential Country Club
- Par: 72
- Length: 6,964 yards (6,368 m)
- Tour: PGA Tour
- Format: Stroke play
- Prize fund: US$125,000
- Month played: December
- Final year: 1969

Tournament record score
- Aggregate: 270 Arnold Palmer (1969)
- To par: −18 as above

Final champion
- (United States) Arnold Palmer
- Location in the United States Location in Florida

The Danny Thomas-Diplomat Classic was a golf tournament in south Florida on the PGA Tour that was played only once, in early December 1969. Held at Diplomat Presidential Country Club, between Miami and Fort Lauderdale, it had a $125,000 purse and a winner's share of $25,000. The last event of the year, it was played opposite a satellite event, the West End Classic in The Bahamas.

Six strokes back at the start of the final round, Arnold Palmer shot 65 (−7) and won by two strokes over runner-up Gay Brewer, the leader after each of the first three rounds. It was consecutive victories for the forty-year-old Palmer, who had broken a winless drought the previous week at the new Heritage Classic in southern South Carolina.

Although this tournament played for only one year, Danny Thomas continued to lend his name to a PGA Tour event for the next fifteen years (1970–84), at the Danny Thomas Memphis Classic in southwest Tennessee.

== Winner ==
Year	Winner	Score	To par	Margin of victory	Runner-up
1969	(United States) Arnold Palmer	270	−18	2 strokes	(United States) Gay Brewer
