= J. L. Lewis =

American golfer (1960–2019)

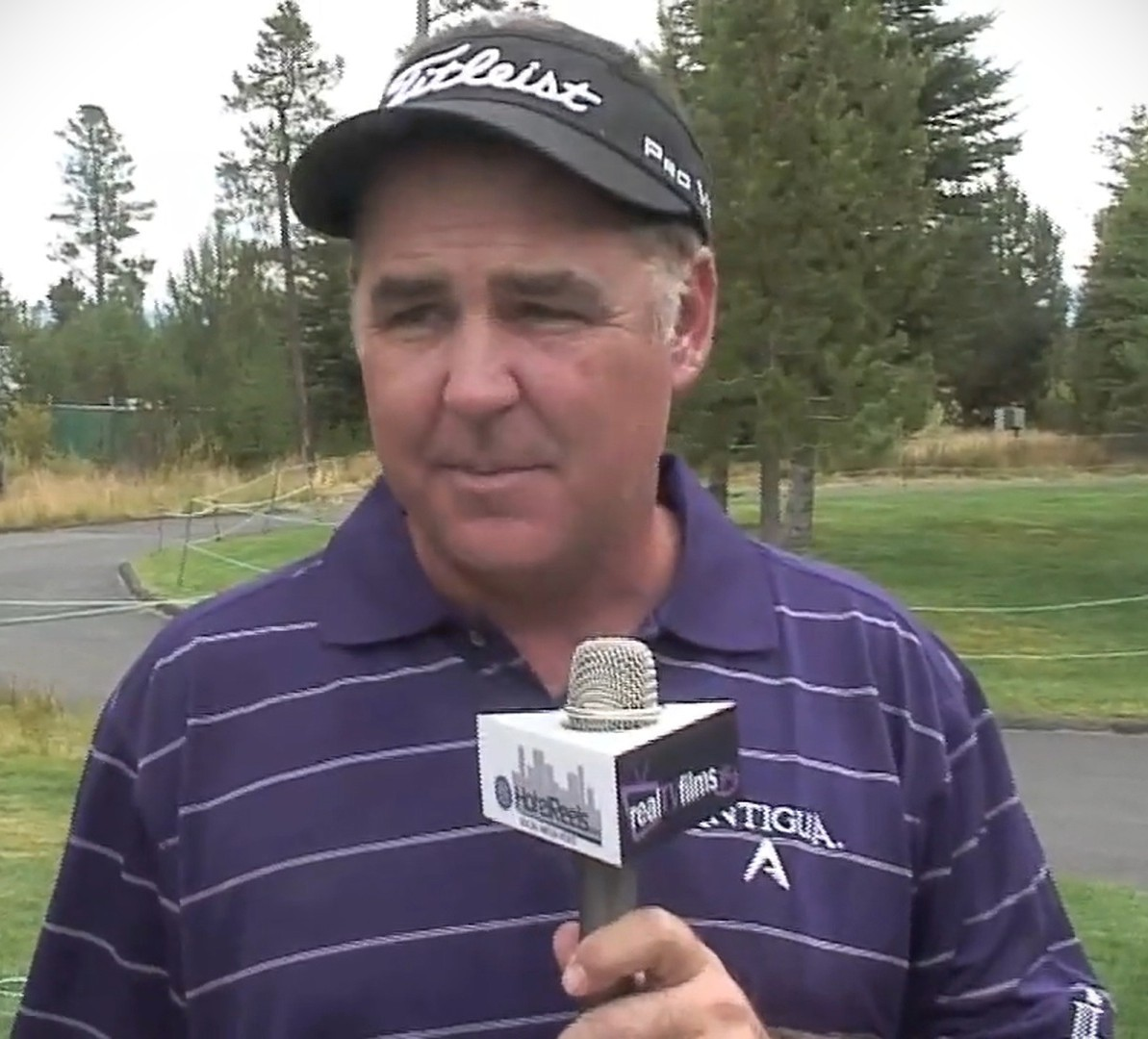
- Lewis in 2010

Personal information
- Full name: John Lee Lewis
- Nationality: United States
- Born: July 18, 1960 Emporia, Kansas, U.S.
- Died: December 31, 2019 (aged 59)
- Height: 6 ft 4 in (1.93 m)
- Weight: 210 lb (95 kg; 15 st)
- Spouse: Dawn Marie Delavan Lewis
- Children: 2

Career
- Sport: Golf
- College: Emporia State University; Southwest Texas State University
- Turned professional: 1984
- Former tours: PGA Tour; Nationwide Tour; Champions Tour
- Professional wins: 5
- Highest ranking: 66 (September 21, 2003)

Number of wins by tour
- PGA Tour: 2
- Other: 3

Best results in major championships
- Masters Tournament: CUT: 2004
- PGA Championship: T21: 1999
- U.S. Open: T30: 2001
- The Open Championship: T22: 2003

John Lee Lewis (July 18, 1960 – December 31, 2019) was an American professional golfer. He won twice on the PGA Tour: the John Deere Classic in 1999, and the 84 Lumber Classic in 2003. In 1999 he won the Honda Invitational in Guadalajara, Mexico. In 2010, Lewis earned a spot on the Champions Tour after placing well on the tour's Q School.

== Early life ==
Lewis was born and raised in Emporia, Kansas. His parents, John and Donna Lewis, taught in Emporia schools for thirty years. His athletic ability was evident from an early age: he played Little League Baseball from 1967 to 1973, and was a winning pitcher with multiple no-hitters. Lewis began playing golf at the age of seven at Emporia Country Club, where he won at the ECC Men's Club Championship twice before graduating from high school. He lettered in football, basketball, and golf at Emporia High School. In 1978, he was named to the all-state high school basketball team, and was awarded a golf scholarship to Emporia State University.

== Amateur career ==
After his sophomore year at Emporia State, Lewis transferred to Southwest Texas State University (now Texas State University–San Marcos). While at Texas State, his team won the 1983 Division II golf championship, and he received First Team All American honors for finishing second individually. He graduated from Texas State with a Bachelor of Science in education with a major in business education and a minor in English.

== Professional career ==
From 1982 to 1987, Lewis participated in the PGA of America apprentice program, and he became a professional golfer in 1984. During these years he was an assistant golf pro at The Hills of Lakeway Golf & Country Club (Live Oak and Yaupon golf courses) in Austin, Texas.

In 1988, Lewis became an assistant golf pro at the Las Vegas Country Club in Las Vegas, Nevada, where he earned his PGA Class A membership. In December 1988, he qualified for the PGA Tour, and competed in 21 tour events during 1989. He was named 1988 Player of the Year, Southwest Section PGA (Las Vegas Chapter).

From 1990 to 1993, Lewis was the golf pro at Forest Creek Golf Club in Round Rock, Texas. As a PGA Club Professional, he won numerous events and was a three-time sectional player of the year, twice in the PGA South Texas Section, and once in the PGA Southwest Section.

In 1994, Lewis was a member of the PGA Cup team; he led the Americans to a victory over the Europeans by making a 50-foot putt on the last hole of the competition. He rejoined the PGA Tour in 1995.

Lewis had an interest in writing, specifically about golf instruction, for which he has penned more than 1,000 golf tips. He published a book, the "Pocket Pro" edition of "Golf Tips from the Tour" in 2009. Lewis retired from competitive golf in 2012.

After his comeback from a strained medial collateral ligament in his left knee suffered in May 2006, Lewis played in four events during the 2007 PGA Tour season. Because he also had a lingering elbow injury, he was granted a major medical extension carryover for the 2008 season.

Lewis's best finishes during 2008 were in the Shell Houston Open (T47), in the Verizon Heritage (T64), and in the Valero Texas Open (T73).

== Personal life ==
In August 1982, Lewis married Dawn Marie Delavan, who grew up in Emporia, Kansas, and graduated from Emporia High School in 1978. Dawn, who played golf and participated in track and field and gymnastics, competed on the University of Texas gymnastics team beginning in the fall of 1978. She managed her husband's golf career and business operations through J.L. Sports, LLC.

Lewis died in December 2019 of multiple myeloma.

== Awards and honors ==
- In 2001, Lewis was inducted into the Emporia High School Hall of Fame.
- In 2002, he entered the Texas State University Hall of Honor.

== Professional wins (5) ==
=== PGA Tour wins (2) ===
| No. | Date | Tournament | Winning score | Margin of victory | Runner(s)-up |
|---|---|---|---|---|---|
| 1 | Jul 25, 1999 | John Deere Classic | −19 (66-65-65-65=261) | Playoff | (United States) Mike Brisky |
| 2 | Sep 21, 2003 | 84 Lumber Classic of Pennsylvania | −22 (69-67-68-62=266) | 2 strokes | (Australia) Stuart Appleby, (United States) Frank Lickliter, (United States) Tim Petrovic |

PGA Tour playoff record (1–0)

| No. | Year | Tournament | Opponent | Result |
|---|---|---|---|---|
| 1 | 1999 | John Deere Classic | (United States) Mike Brisky | Won with birdie on fifth extra hole |

=== Other wins (3) ===
- 1992 Southern Texas PGA Championship
- 1993 Southern Texas PGA Championship
- 1999 Honda Invitational (Mexico)

== Results in major championships ==
| Tournament | 1993 | 1994 | 1995 | 1996 | 1997 | 1998 | 1999 | 2000 | 2001 | 2002 | 2003 | 2004 | 2005 |
|---|---|---|---|---|---|---|---|---|---|---|---|---|---|
| Masters Tournament | | | | | | | | | | | | CUT | |
| U.S. Open | | | | T40 | | | | CUT | T30 | | | CUT | T49 |
| The Open Championship | | | | | | | | | | | T22 | | |
| PGA Championship | CUT | CUT | | | | | T21 | | | CUT | T34 | T24 | T47 |

Did not play

CUT = missed the half-way cut
"T" = tied

== Results in The Players Championship ==
| Tournament | 1999 | 2000 | 2001 | 2002 | 2003 | 2004 | 2005 | 2006 |
|---|---|---|---|---|---|---|---|---|
| The Players Championship | CUT | CUT | T73 | T63 | CUT | CUT | T8 | CUT |

Top 10

CUT = missed the halfway cut
"T" indicates a tie for a place

== Results in World Golf Championships ==
| Tournament | 2003 | 2004 |
|---|---|---|
| Match Play | | |
| Championship | T59 | |
| Invitational | | T55 |

Did not play

"T" = Tied

== U.S. national team appearances ==
- PGA Cup: 1994 (winners)

== See also ==
- 1988 PGA Tour Qualifying School graduates
- 1994 PGA Tour Qualifying School graduates
- 1997 Nike Tour graduates
