= West End Classic =

Golf tournament formerly on the PGA Tour

Tournament information
- Location: West End, Bahamas
- Established: 1967
- Courses: Grand Bahama Hotel and Country Club
- Par: 72
- Tour: PGA Tour
- Format: Stroke play
- Prize fund: US$25,000
- Month played: December
- Final year: 1969

Tournament record score
- Aggregate: 274 Jim Wiechers (1969)
- To par: −14 as above

Final champion
- (United States) Jim Wiechers
- Location in The Bahamas

The West End Classic was PGA Tour satellite event that was played at the Grand Bahama Hotel and Country Club in West End on Grand Bahama Island from 1967 to 1969. In 1970 it was replaced by a new PGA Tour event, the Bahamas National Open, which was contested in 1970 and 1971.

== Summary ==
In 1967, Butch Baird won by one stroke over Bert Weaver, winning $4,000 from a $20,000 purse. In 1968, Bruce Crampton won by two strokes, winning $4,000 from a $20,000 purse. The 1969 tournament was won by Jim Wiechers, a 25-year-old Californian, by five strokes over Al Besselink and Johnny Pott. The purse was $25,000 with $5,000 going to the winner. The 1969 tournament was played in December opposite the Danny Thomas-Diplomat Classic, which was won by Arnold Palmer. The field, however, was better than a normal satellite field because it was the last tournament of the year, and the players were jockeying for position on the top-60 money list.

Players were allowed to use the regular-sized American ball and/or the smaller English ball. This may have been the only time that this was ever allowed during a PGA-sanctioned event. The competitors would play the bigger ball down wind, and the small ball into the wind.

== Winners ==
Year	Tour (Note: PGAT − PGA Tour.)	Winner	Score	To par	Margin of victory	Runner(s)-up	Ref.
1969	PGAT	(United States) Jim Wiechers	274	−14	5 strokes	(United States) Al Besselink (United States) Johnny Pott	
1968		(Australia) Bruce Crampton	276	−12	2 strokes	(United States) Gene Borek (United States) Bob Watson	
1967		(United States) Butch Baird	279	−9	1 stroke	(United States) Bert Weaver	
