= Monty Kaser =

American professional golfer (1941–2009)

Personal information
- Full name: Lamont A. Kaser
- Nationality: United States
- Born: September 24, 1941 Wichita, Kansas
- Died: September 19, 2009 (aged 67) Las Vegas, Nevada

Career
- Sport: Golf
- Status: Professional
- Former tours: PGA Tour; Champions Tour
- Professional wins: 1

Number of wins by tour
- PGA Tour: 1

Best results in major championships
- Masters Tournament: DNP
- PGA Championship: CUT: 1970
- U.S. Open: T46: 1970
- The Open Championship: DNP

Lamont A. "Monty" Kaser (September 24, 1941 – September 19, 2009) was an American professional golfer.

== Early life and amateur career ==
A native of Wichita, Kansas, Kaser competed in amateur tournaments during the early- and mid-1960s. He worked in the payroll department of a Wichita aircraft factory during his amateur career. His biggest win as an amateur came at the 1966 U.S. Amateur Public Links.

== Professional career ==
Kaser won one PGA Tour event during his professional career, the 1969 Indian Ridge Hospital Open Invitational, which was played at Indian Ridge Country Club in Andover, Massachusetts. His best finish in a major championship was T-46 at the 1970 U.S. Open.

After reaching the age of 50, Kaser played briefly on the Senior PGA Tour. Kaser died five days shy of his 68th birthday in Las Vegas, Nevada, where he had lived since retiring from golf. He had been suffering from prostate cancer.

== Amateur wins ==
- 1962 Kansas Amateur Match Play Championship
- 1966 U.S. Amateur Public Links

== Professional wins (1) ==
=== PGA Tour wins (1) ===
No.	Date	Tournament	Winning score	Margin of victory	Runner-up
1	Aug 17, 1969	Indian Ridge Hospital Open Invitational	−10 (72-64-69-69=274)	1 stroke	(United States) Steve Oppermann

== See also ==
- 1966 PGA Tour Qualifying School graduates
