= Kermit Zarley =

American professional golfer (born 1941)

Personal information
- Full name: Kermit Millard Zarley, Jr.
- Nationality: United States
- Born: September 29, 1941 (age 85) Seattle, Washington, U.S.
- Height: 6 ft 0 in (1.83 m)
- Weight: 175 lb (79 kg; 12.5 st)

Career
- Sport: Golf
- College: University of Houston
- Turned professional: 1963
- Former tours: PGA Tour; Champions Tour
- Professional wins: 6

Number of wins by tour
- PGA Tour: 3
- PGA Tour Champions: 1
- Other: 2

Best results in major championships
- Masters Tournament: T17: 1973
- PGA Championship: T8: 1968
- U.S. Open: 6th: 1972
- The Open Championship: DNP

Kermit Millard Zarley, Jr. (born September 29, 1941) is an American professional golfer who played on the PGA Tour and the Champions Tour. He is also an author of several books on Christianity, Jesus, and the Bible.

== Early life and amateur career ==
Zarley was born in Seattle, Washington. He attended from the University of Houston. Zarley was a distinguished member of the Houston Cougars golf team. He was the individual champion at the 1962 NCAA Division I Championships and also led his team to victory. Zarley graduated in 1963.

== Professional career ==
Zarley had three dozen top-10 finishes in PGA Tour events during his 18 years on Tour including three wins. He had three top-10 finishes in major championships; his best was a solo 6th at the 1972 U.S. Open. Zarley won once on the PGA Senior Tour. Between tours, he finished second or tied for second seventeen times.

In 1965, Zarley co-founded the PGA Tour Bible Study group with fellow PGA Tour players Jim and Babe Hiskey. It is still active in the world of professional golf. In the period between his careers on the PGA Tour and the Champions Tour he wrote three books on religion and world affairs.

== Personal life ==
Zarley, who has studied the Bible since his teens, is the author of several books on Christianity, Jesus, and the Bible. His first book, The Gospels Interwoven, in which he attempted to join all four gospels together into one narrative, received praise from Billy Graham and Richard C. Halverson. Zarley is a member of the Society of Biblical Literature.

Zarley resides in Scottsdale, Arizona.

== Awards and honors ==
Zarley received an honorary Ph.D. from North Park University in Chicago in 2001. The university has a lecture series named after him.

== In popular culture ==
- Due to his unusual name, Zarley was often called "the Pro from the Moon" or "Moon Man." It is because comedian Bob Hope once interviewed him on national television and remarked, "Kermit Zarley, with a name like that he must be the pro from the moon."

== Amateur wins ==
- 1962 NCAA Championship, Pacific Northwest Amateur

== Professional wins (6) ==
=== PGA Tour wins (3) ===
No.	Date	Tournament	Winning score	Margin of victory	Runner(s)-up
1	Jan 21, 1968	Kaiser International Open Invitational	−15 (71-67-70-65=273)	1 stroke	(United States) Dave Marr
2	Jul 5, 1970	Canadian Open	−9 (69-73-70-67=279)	3 strokes	(United States) Gibby Gilbert
3	Jul 30, 1972	National Team Championship (with (United States) Babe Hiskey)	−22 (67-63-66-66=262)	3 strokes	(United States) Grier Jones and (United States) Johnny Miller

PGA Tour playoff record (0–1)

No.	Year	Tournament	Opponent	Result
1	1976	Florida Citrus Open	(United States) Hale Irwin	Lost to par on sixth extra hole

=== Tournament Players Series wins (1) ===
- 1984 Tallahassee Open

=== Other wins (1) ===
- 1964 Arizona Open

=== Senior PGA Tour wins (1) ===
No.	Date	Tournament	Winning score	Margin of victory	Runner-up
1	Oct 9, 1994	The Transamerica	−12 (70-68-66=204)	Playoff	(Japan) Isao Aoki

Senior PGA Tour playoff record (1–2)

No.	Year	Tournament	Opponent(s)	Result
1	1994	Royal Caribbean Classic	(United States) Lee Trevino	Lost to par on fourth extra hole
2	1994	The Transamerica	(Japan) Isao Aoki	Won with birdie on first extra hole
3	1996	Bruno's Memorial Classic	(South Africa) John Bland, (United States) John Paul Cain	Bland won with bogey on third extra hole Zarley eliminated by par on second hole

== Results in major championships ==
Tournament	1965	1966	1967	1968	1969	1970	1971	1972	1973	1974
Masters Tournament				T20	T35	CUT			T17	T31
U.S. Open	CUT				T13	T36	T27	6	CUT	T40
PGA Championship				T8	T59	T22		T68	T9	T51

Tournament	1975	1976	1977	1978	1979	1980	1981	1982
Masters Tournament								
U.S. Open	T24	T44	CUT					T39
PGA Championship		T43	T54	T51	T19	T42	CUT	

Note: Zarley never played in The Open Championship.

Top 10
Did not play

CUT = missed the half-way cut
"T" indicates a tie for a place

=== Summary ===
Tournament	Wins	2nd	3rd	Top-5	Top-10	Top-25	Events	Cuts made
Masters Tournament	0	0	0	0	0	2	5	4
U.S. Open	0	0	0	0	1	3	11	8
The Open Championship	0	0	0	0	0	0	0	0
PGA Championship	0	0	0	0	2	4	12	11
Totals	0	0	0	0	3	9	28	23

- Most consecutive cuts made – 7 (1973 PGA – 1976 PGA)
- Longest streak of top-10s – 1 (three times)

== Books ==
- The Gospel (1987). Scripture Press. Out-of-print. German adaptation--Das Leben Jesu: Die authentische Biographie (1991). Hanssler.
- The Gospels Interwoven (1987). Scripture Press. Reprinted by Wipf & Stock (2001). ISBN 1-57910-775-3. (with introduction by S. Lewis Johnson)
- Palestine Is Coming: The Revival of Ancient Philistia (1990). Hannibal Books. Re-issued by Wipf & Stock (2005). ISBN 1-55635-181-X.
- The Third Day Bible Code (2006). Synergy Books. ISBN 1-933538-43-0.
- Warrior from Heaven (2009). Synergy Books. ISBN 0-9815462-2-6.
- The Restitution of Jesus Christ (2008). Self-published. No ISBN.
- The Solving the Samaritan Riddle: Peter's Keys Explain Early Spirit Baptism (2015). Wipf & Stock. ISBN 9781498225281.
- The Restitution: Biblical Proof Jesus Is Not God (2023). ISBN 978-1735259161
- The Gospel Corrupted: When Jesus was Made God (2023). ISBN 978-1735259185
- Christ on the PGA Tour (1965-1982) (2025). ISBN 979-8991848954
