= Butch Baird =

American professional golfer

Personal information
- Full name: Fred Baird
- Nationality: United States
- Born: July 20, 1936 (age 90) Chicago, Illinois, U.S.
- Height: 5 ft 8 in (1.73 m)
- Weight: 155 lb (70 kg; 11.1 st)

Career
- Sport: Golf
- Turned professional: 1959
- Former tours: PGA Tour; Champions Tour
- Professional wins: 14

Number of wins by tour
- PGA Tour: 2
- PGA Tour Champions: 2
- Other: 9 (regular); 1 (senior)

Best results in major championships
- Masters Tournament: CUT: 1977
- PGA Championship: T28: 1966
- U.S. Open: T4: 1976
- The Open Championship: CUT: 1978

Fred "Butch" Baird (born July 20, 1936) is an American professional golfer. He played on the PGA Tour and the Senior PGA Tour.

== Early life ==
Baird was born in Chicago, Illinois. He learned the game at the age of 14 from his father. After he graduated from high school he worked in the oil industry for a few years.

== Professional career ==
In 1959, Baird turned professional. Baird won two official PGA Tour events during his career: the 1961 Waco Turner Open and the 1976 San Antonio Texas Open. The San Antonio victory came 15 years, 5 months and 10 days after the Waco win, and was the record for longest time span between victories in PGA history until eclipsed by Robert Gamez in 2005. His career year came in 1976, when in addition to his San Antonio win, he finished 46th on the money list with $58,192. Also in 1976, came his best finish in a major championship — a T-4 at the U.S. Open.

He now has a golf-memorabilia marketing business, BBJM Golf Enterprises, with partner Jack Mishler.

== Personal life ==
Baird now lives in Scottsdale, Arizona. His son, Briny, is also a professional golfer.

== Professional wins (14) ==
=== PGA Tour wins (2) ===
No.	Date	Tournament	Winning score	Margin of victory	Runner-up
1	May 7, 1961	Waco Turner Open	−7 (73-72-68-68=281)	1 stroke	(United States) Rex Baxter
2	Oct 17, 1976	San Antonio Texas Open	−15 (68-70-70-65=273)	Playoff	(United States) Miller Barber

PGA Tour playoff record (1–0)

No.	Year	Tournament	Opponent	Result
1	1976	San Antonio Texas Open	(United States) Miller Barber	Won with birdie on first extra hole

=== PGA Tour satellite win (1) ===
- 1967 West End Classic

=== Caribbean Tour wins (5) ===
- 1967 Los Lagartos Open
- 1968 Panama Open
- 1969 Panama Open, Maracaibo Open Invitational
- 1979 Panama Open (tie with Chi-Chi Rodríguez)

=== Other wins (3) ===
- 1965 PGA National Four-ball Championship (with Gay Brewer)
- 1968 Southern Texas PGA Championship
- 1974 Florida PGA Championship

=== Senior PGA Tour wins (2) ===
No.	Date	Tournament	Winning score	Margin of victory	Runner(s)-up
1	Oct 19, 1986	Cuyahoga Seniors International	−3 (70-71-69=210)	4 strokes	(United States) Chi-Chi Rodríguez
2	Jun 18, 1989	Northville Long Island Classic	−9 (58-62-63=183)*	Playoff	(United States) Frank Beard, (United States) Don Bies, (United States) Orville Moody

*Note: The 1989 Northville Long Island Classic was played over 16 holes for each round due to flooding.

Senior PGA Tour playoff record (1–1)

No.	Year	Tournament	Opponent(s)	Result
1	1987	MONY Senior Tournament of Champions	(United States) Don January	Lost to birdie on fourth extra hole
2	1989	Northville Long Island Classic	(United States) Frank Beard, (United States) Don Bies, (United States) Orville Moody	Won with birdie on first extra hole

=== Other senior wins (1) ===
- 2007 Liberty Mutual Legends of Golf - Demaret Division (with Bobby Nichols)

== Results in major championships ==
!Tournament	1961	1962	1963	1964	1965	1966	1967	1968	1969
Masters Tournament									
U.S. Open	CUT	CUT		CUT			T42		
The Open Championship									
PGA Championship				CUT		T28			T32

!Tournament	1970	1971	1972	1973	1974	1975	1976	1977	1978	1979	1980	1981	1982
Masters Tournament								CUT					
U.S. Open				T52			T4	CUT					T53
The Open Championship									CUT				
PGA Championship						T40	CUT	T42					

Top 10
Did not play

CUT = missed the half-way cut
"T" = tied
