= Babe Hiskey =

American professional golfer

Personal information
- Full name: Bryant Hiskey
- Nationality: United States
- Born: November 21, 1938 (age 87) Burley, Idaho, U.S.
- Height: 6 ft 0 in (1.83 m)
- Weight: 175 lb (79 kg; 12.5 st)

Career
- Sport: Golf
- College: University of Houston
- Turned professional: 1961
- Former tours: PGA Tour; Champions Tour
- Professional wins: 6

Number of wins by tour
- PGA Tour: 3
- Other: 3

Best results in major championships
- Masters Tournament: T17: 1973
- PGA Championship: T40: 1971
- U.S. Open: 53rd: 1964
- The Open Championship: CUT: 1989

Bryant "Babe" Hiskey (born November 21, 1938) is an American professional golfer. He played on the PGA Tour and the Champions Tour.

== Early life and amateur career ==
In 1938, Hiskey was born in Burley, Idaho. He won the Idaho Amateur three times.

Hiskey attended the University of Houston. He was a member of the Houston Cougars golf team.

== Professional career ==
In 1961, Hiskey turned professional. In 1970, Hiskey won the Sahara Invitational by one stroke over Miller Barber, Terry Dill and Bob Goalby.

After turning 50, Hiskey played on the Senior PGA Tour. His best finish was second place at the 1995 First of America Classic.

Hiskey's brother, Jim and his nephew, Paul are also professional golfers. After retiring as a touring professional, he worked as a golf course architect. His designs include Highland Golf Course in Pocatello, Idaho. He lives in Galveston, Texas.

== Amateur wins ==
- 1956 Idaho Amateur
- 1960 Idaho Amateur
- 1961 Idaho Amateur
- 1962 Utah State Amateur

== Professional wins (6) ==
=== PGA Tour wins (3) ===
No.	Date	Tournament	Winning score	Margin of victory	Runner(s)-up
1	Nov 28, 1965	Cajun Classic Open Invitational	−13 (68-69-71-67=275)	Playoff	(United States) Dudley Wysong
2	Nov 1, 1970	Sahara Invitational	−12 (70-70-65-71=276)	1 stroke	(United States) Miller Barber, (United States) Terry Dill, (United States) Bob Goalby
3	Jul 30, 1972	National Team Championship (with (United States) Kermit Zarley)	−22 (67-63-66-66=262)	3 strokes	(United States) Grier Jones and (United States) Johnny Miller

PGA Tour playoff record (1–0)

No.	Year	Tournament	Opponent	Result
1	1965	Cajun Classic Open Invitational	(United States) Dudley Wysong	Won with birdie on second extra hole

=== Other wins (3) ===
- 1962 Oklahoma Open
- 1970 Southern Texas PGA Championship
- 1983 Southern Texas PGA Championship
