= 1987 U.S. Open (golf) =

Coordinates: 37.709°N 122.495°W

Tournament information
- Dates: June 18–21, 1987
- Location: San Francisco, California
- Course(s): Olympic Club, Lake Course
- Organized by: USGA
- Tour: PGA Tour
- Format: Stroke play

Statistics
- Par: 70
- Length: 6,709 yards (6,135 m)
- Field: 156 players, 77 after cut
- Cut: 147 (+7)
- Prize fund: $825,000
- Winner's share: $150,000

Champion
- (United States) Scott Simpson
- 277 (−3)

Location in the United States

The 1987 U.S. Open was the 87th U.S. Open, held June 18–21 at the Olympic Club in San Francisco, California. Scott Simpson passed and held off 1982 champion Tom Watson on the Lake Course to win his only major title by one stroke.

Eleven former champions were in the field and only four made the 36-hole cut.

This was the third U.S. Open at the Lake Course of the Olympic Club, the previous two in 1955 and 1966 ended in playoffs. The U.S. Open returned in 1998 and 2012; both were won by one stroke.

== Course layout ==
Olympic Club - Lake Course

| Hole | 1 | 2 | 3 | 4 | 5 | 6 | 7 | 8 | 9 | Out | 10 | 11 | 12 | 13 | 14 | 15 | 16 | 17 | 18 | In | Total |
|---|---|---|---|---|---|---|---|---|---|---|---|---|---|---|---|---|---|---|---|---|---|
| Yards | 533 | 394 | 223 | 438 | 457 | 437 | 288 | 132 | 433 | 3,335 | 422 | 430 | 390 | 186 | 417 | 149 | 609 | 428 | 343 | 3,374 | 6,709 |
| Par | 5 | 4 | 3 | 4 | 4 | 4 | 4 | 3 | 4 | 35 | 4 | 4 | 4 | 3 | 4 | 3 | 5 | 4 | 4 | 35 | 70 |

Lengths of the course for previous major championships:

- 6,719 yards (6,144 m), par 70 - 1966 U.S. Open
- 6,700 yards (6,126 m), par 70 - 1955 U.S. Open

== Round summaries ==
=== First round ===
Thursday, June 18, 1987

| Place | Player | Score | To par |
|---|---|---|---|
| 1 | (United States) Ben Crenshaw | 67 | −3 |
| T2 | (Spain) Seve Ballesteros | 68 | −2 |
| T2 | (United States) Raymond Floyd | 68 | −2 |
| T2 | (Japan) Tsuneyuki Nakajima | 68 | −2 |
| T5 | (West Germany) Bernhard Langer | 69 | −1 |
| T5 | (Zimbabwe) Nick Price | 69 | −1 |
| T5 | (Zimbabwe) Denis Watson | 69 | −1 |
| T8 | (United States) Jay Don Blake | 70 | E |
| T8 | (United States) Lennie Clements | 70 | E |
| T8 | (United States) John Cook | 70 | E |
| T8 | (United States) Dale Douglass | 70 | E |
| T8 | (South Africa) David Frost | 70 | E |
| T8 | (Scotland) Sandy Lyle | 70 | E |
| T8 | (United States) Jack Nicklaus | 70 | E |
| T8 | (United States) Jim Thorpe | 70 | E |
| T8 | (United States) Bob Tway | 70 | E |
| T8 | (United States) Mark Wiebe | 70 | E |

=== Second round ===
Friday, June 19, 1987

| Place | Player | Score | To par |
|---|---|---|---|
| T1 | (United States) Tom Watson | 72-65=137 | −3 |
| T1 | (United States) Mark Wiebe | 70-67=137 | −3 |
| T3 | (United States) John Cook | 70-68=138 | −2 |
| T3 | (West Germany) Bernhard Langer | 69-69=138 | −2 |
| T3 | (Japan) Tsuneyuki Nakajima | 68-70=138 | −2 |
| T3 | (United States) Jack Nicklaus | 70-68=138 | −2 |
| T3 | (United States) Jim Thorpe | 70-68=138 | −2 |
| T8 | (United States) Ben Crenshaw | 67-72=139 | −1 |
| T8 | (United States) Bob Eastwood | 73-66=139 | −1 |
| T8 | (United States) Larry Mize | 71-68=139 | −1 |
| T8 | (United States) Scott Simpson | 71-68=139 | −1 |

Amateurs: Alexander (+13), Parker (+13).

=== Third round ===
Saturday, June 20, 1987

| Place | Player | Score | To par |
|---|---|---|---|
| 1 | (United States) Tom Watson | 72-65-71=208 | −2 |
| T2 | (United States) Keith Clearwater | 74-71-64=209 | −1 |
| T2 | (United States) Scott Simpson | 71-68-70=209 | −1 |
| 4 | (United States) Lennie Clements | 70-70-70=210 | E |
| T5 | (Spain) Seve Ballesteros | 68-75-68=211 | +1 |
| T5 | (United States) Ben Crenshaw | 67-72-72=211 | +1 |
| T5 | (West Germany) Bernhard Langer | 69-69-73=211 | +1 |
| T5 | (United States) John Mahaffey | 72-72-67=211 | +1 |
| T5 | (United States) Larry Mize | 71-68-72=211 | +1 |
| T5 | (United States) Jim Thorpe | 70-68-73=211 | +1 |

=== Final round ===
Sunday, June 21, 1987

Watson held a share of the lead after 36 holes, then took a one-shot lead over Simpson and Keith Clearwater into the final round. Clearwater, 27, shot a six-under 64 on Saturday to get into the final pair with Watson. Watson struggled out of the gate on Sunday on Olympic's difficult start; he bogeyed the first two holes and the fifth as well. Simpson birdied the first but then had three bogeys in four holes. With consecutive birdies at 8 and 9, Watson carried a one-stroke lead to the back nine. Simpson, a group ahead on the course, took the lead with a 30-footer (9 m) for birdie at 15, but Watson responded with a birdie at 14 to tie. At 16, Simpson sank a 9-footer (2.7 m) for his third straight birdie to take the lead, then Watson missed his from 12 feet (3.7 m) to match. Simpson found a greenside bunker at 17, then hit his sand shot to 6 feet (1.8 m) and saved par. With a par on 18, Simpson was in the clubhouse with a 68 and Watson needed a birdie to a force a Monday playoff. His 35-foot (11 m) putt narrowly missed and Simpson was the champion by a stroke. In the final pairing, Clearwater had trouble both early and late and shot a 79 (+9) to fade to a tie for 31st. Seve Ballesteros finished in solo third place, his best career finish in a U.S. Open.

| Place | Player | Score | To par | Money ($) |
|---|---|---|---|---|
| 1 | (United States) Scott Simpson | 71-68-70-68=277 | −3 | 150,000 |
| 2 | (United States) Tom Watson | 72-65-71-70=278 | −2 | 75,000 |
| 3 | (Spain) Seve Ballesteros | 68-75-68-71=282 | +2 | 46,240 |
| T4 | (United States) Ben Crenshaw | 67-72-72-72=283 | +3 | 24,542 |
| T4 | (West Germany) Bernhard Langer | 69-69-73-72=283 | +3 | 24,542 |
| T4 | (United States) Larry Mize | 71-68-72-72=283 | +3 | 24,542 |
| T4 | (United States) Curtis Strange | 71-72-69-71=283 | +3 | 24,542 |
| T4 | (United States) Bobby Wadkins | 71-71-70-71=283 | +3 | 24,542 |
| T9 | (United States) Lennie Clements | 70-70-70-74=284 | +4 | 15,004 |
| T9 | (Japan) Tsuneyuki Nakajima | 68-70-74-72=284 | +4 | 15,004 |
| T9 | (United States) Mac O'Grady | 71-69-72-72=284 | +4 | 15,004 |
| T9 | (United States) Dan Pohl | 75-71-69-69=284 | +4 | 15,004 |
| T9 | (United States) Jim Thorpe | 70-68-73-73=284 | +4 | 15,004 |

==== Scorecard ====
Final round

| Hole | 1 | 2 | 3 | 4 | 5 | 6 | 7 | 8 | 9 | 10 | 11 | 12 | 13 | 14 | 15 | 16 | 17 | 18 |
|---|---|---|---|---|---|---|---|---|---|---|---|---|---|---|---|---|---|---|
| Par | 5 | 4 | 3 | 4 | 4 | 4 | 4 | 3 | 4 | 4 | 4 | 4 | 3 | 4 | 3 | 5 | 4 | 4 |
| (United States) Simpson | −2 | −2 | −1 | E | E | +1 | E | E | E | E | E | E | E | −1 | −2 | −3 | −3 | −3 |
| (United States) Watson | −1 | E | E | E | +1 | +1 | +1 | E | −1 | −1 | −1 | −1 | −1 | −2 | −2 | −2 | −2 | −2 |
| (Spain) Ballesteros | E | E | +1 | +2 | +3 | +3 | +2 | +1 | +1 | +1 | E | +1 | +2 | +2 | +1 | +1 | +2 | +2 |
| (United States) Crenshaw | +2 | +2 | +2 | +2 | +2 | +2 | +2 | +2 | +1 | E | +1 | +2 | +2 | +1 | +1 | +2 | +3 | +3 |
| (West Germany) Langer | E | E | E | E | E | +1 | +1 | +1 | +1 | +1 | +1 | +2 | +2 | +1 | +2 | +2 | +2 | +3 |
| (United States) Mize | +1 | +1 | E | E | E | +1 | +1 | +1 | +1 | E | E | +1 | +2 | +3 | +3 | +3 | +3 | +3 |
| (United States) Strange | +3 | +3 | +3 | +3 | +4 | +4 | +4 | +3 | +2 | +2 | +2 | +2 | +2 | +3 | +3 | +3 | +4 | +3 |
| (United States) Wadkins | +2 | +2 | +3 | +3 | +4 | +4 | +4 | +4 | +4 | +3 | +3 | +3 | +2 | +3 | +3 | +3 | +4 | +3 |
| (United States) Clements | E | +1 | +2 | +2 | +3 | +4 | +3 | +3 | +3 | +3 | +3 | +3 | +4 | +3 | +3 | +4 | +4 | +4 |
| (United States) Clearwater | −1 | E | +2 | +2 | +3 | +3 | +3 | +3 | +3 | +3 | +3 | +3 | +3 | +3 | +3 | +4 | +7 | +8 |

Cumulative tournament scores, relative to par

| Birdie | Bogey | Double bogey | Triple bogey+ |
