= 2012 Women's British Open =

Golf tournament

Coordinates: 53.3875°N 3.185°W

2012 Ricoh Women's British Open
Tournament information
- Dates: 13–16 September 2012
- Location: Merseyside, England
- Course: Royal Liverpool Golf Club
- Organized by: Ladies' Golf Union
- Tours: Ladies European Tour; LPGA Tour

Statistics
- Par: 72
- Length: 6,657 yards (6,087 m)
- Field: 144 players, 57 after cut
- Cut: 149 (+5)
- Prize fund: $2,750,000 €2,129,532 £1,707,437
- Winner's share: $428,650 €331,936 £266,143

Champion
- (South Korea) Jiyai Shin
- 279 (−9)

Location in England
Royal Liverpool Golf Club in Hoylake, Merseyside, west of Liverpool, England

The 2012 Women's British Open Ricoh was held 13–16 September at Royal Liverpool Golf Club in Merseyside, England. It was the 36th Women's British Open, and the 12th as a major championship on the LPGA Tour. It was scheduled later in the year due to the 2012 Summer Olympics in London. Jiyai Shin won her second Women's British Open, nine strokes ahead of runner-up Inbee Park.

Weather was a factor, as the second round on Friday was halted before 8:30 a.m. due to high winds. The scores were thrown out and the round was restarted on Saturday, with the final two rounds played on Sunday.

== Exemptions and qualifying events ==
The field for the tournament was 144, and golfers gained a place in three ways. Most players earn exemptions based on good past performances on the Ladies European Tour, the LPGA Tour and in previous major championships and top-ranked players in the Women's World Golf Rankings. The rest of the field earned entry by successfully competing in qualifying tournaments open to any professional female golfer or amateur with a low handicap. The final qualifying tournament was held at Caldy Golf Club just up the road from the famous links.

There were 15 exemption categories for the 2012 Women's British Open. These are:

- The top 30 finishers (and ties) from the 2011 Women's British Open.
- The top 10 Ladies European Tour members in the Women's World Golf Rankings who did not finish in the top 30 of the 2011 Women's British Open.
- The top 30 LPGA Tour members in the Women's World Golf Rankings who did not finish in the top 30 of the 2011 Women's British Open.
- The top 25 on the current LET money list not already exempt from the 2011 Women's British Open or the world rankings.
- The top 40 on the current LPGA Tour money list not already exempt from the 2011 Women's British Open or the world rankings.
- The top five on the current LPGA of Japan Tour money list not already exempt from the 2011 Women's British Open or through the world rankings if they are also members of the LET or LPGA. (Note that these six categories will account for approximately 125 entries — or 5/6ths of the players in the final field.)
- Winners of any recognised LET or LPGA Tour events in the calendar year 2012.
- Winners of the 2011 LET, LPGA, JLPGA and KLPGA money lists.
- Winners of the last 10 editions of the Women's British Open.
- Winners of the last five editions of one of the other three LPGA majors.
- Winner of the 2011 Japan LPGA Tour Championship Ricoh Cup.
- The leading five LPGA Tour members upon completion of 36 holes in the 2012 Jamie Farr Toledo Classic who have entered the Championship and who are not otherwise exempt.
- The leading 3 LET members in the 2012 ISPS Handa Ladies British Masters, who have entered the Championship and who are not otherwise exempt.
- The 2012 British Ladies Amateur champion, 2011 Ladies' British Open Amateur Stroke Play champion, 2011 U.S. Women's Amateur champion and 2011 European Ladies' Amateur champion, provided they are still amateurs at the time of the Championship and a maximum of two other leading amateurs at the discretion of the Ladies’ Golf Union.
- Any players granted special exemptions from qualifying by the Championship Committee.

== Course ==
Hole	Name	Yards	Par	Hole	Name	Yards	Par
1	17 - Royal	392	4	10	8 - Far	493	5
2	18 - Stand	377	4	11	9 - Punch Bowl	382	4
3	1 - Course	405	4	12	10 - Dee	397	4
4	2 - Road	358	4	13	11 - Alps	151	3
5	3 - Long	528	5	14	12 - Hilbre	400	4
6	4 - New	157	3	15	13 - Rushes	161	3
7	5 - Telegraph	380	4	16	14 - Field	519	5
8	6 - Briars	382	4	17	15 - Lake	457	4
9	7 - Dowie	178	3	18	16 - Dun	540	5
Out		3,157	35	In		3,500	37
Source:				Total		6,657	72

- The Open Championship in 2006 was also set as a par 72, but at 7,258 yards (6,637 m), 601 yards (550 m) longer.
- Both layouts started on club hole #17 (Royal) and ended at the par-5 #16 (Dun).

== Round summaries ==
=== First round ===
Thursday, 13 September 2012

Place	Player	Score	To par
T1	(South Korea) Haeji Kang	70	−2
T1	(South Korea) So Yeon Ryu	70	−2
T3	(United States) Katie Futcher	71	−1
T3	(Wales) Lydia Hall	71	−1
T3	(England) Charley Hull (a)	71	−1
T3	(United States) Vicky Hurst	71	−1
T3	(Australia) Stacey Keating	71	−1
T3	(Japan) Ai Miyazato	71	−1
T3	(Japan) Mika Miyazato	71	−1
T3	(South Korea) Jiyai Shin	71	−1
T3	(Australia) Karrie Webb	71	−1

=== Second round ===
Saturday, 15 September 2012

Second round play began on Friday morning in adverse wind conditions, which worsened with gusts of 60 mph (100 km/h). Play was stopped at 8:25 a.m. and did not resume; all scores for the day were declared null and void and were scrapped. The second round was restarted on Saturday morning, with the third and fourth rounds both scheduled for Sunday off of split tees, as the Monday forecast was for weather similar to Friday's. In order to complete the final 36 holes on Sunday in the reduced daylight of mid-September, the cut was reduced by fifteen players, to the top fifty and ties. Professionals within the top 65 and ties earned official prize money.

Place	Player	Score	To par
1	(South Korea) Jiyai Shin	71-64=135	−9
2	(South Korea) Inbee Park	72-68=140	−4
T3	(Japan) Mika Miyazato	71-70=141	−3
T3	(Australia) Karrie Webb	71-70=141	−3
5	(United States) Katie Futcher	71-71=142	−2
T6	(United States) Vicky Hurst	71-72=143	−1
T6	(New Zealand) Lydia Ko (a)	72-71=143	−1
T6	(Sweden) Carin Koch	72-71=143	−1
T6	(Japan) Ai Miyazato	71-72=143	−1
T6	(South Korea) Jenny Shin	75-68=143	−1

Amateurs: Ko (−1), Clyburn (+1), Law (+2), Yan (+5), Hull (+7), Taylor (+7), Peters (+9), Boulden (+10), Maguire (+13), Thompson (+14).

=== Third round ===
Sunday, 16 September 2012 (morning)

Place	Player	Score	To par
1	(South Korea) Jiyai Shin	71-64-71=206	−10
2	(Australia) Karrie Webb	71-70-68=209	−7
3	(South Korea) Inbee Park	72-68-72=212	−4
4	(Japan) Mika Miyazato	71-70-72=213	−3
5	(South Korea) Jenny Shin	75-68-71=214	−2
T6	(United States) Katie Futcher	71-71-73=215	−1
T6	(South Korea) So Yeon Ryu	70-74-71=215	−1
T8	(Japan) Yuki Ichinose	72-72-72=216	E
T8	(Japan) Ai Miyazato	71-72-73=216	E
T10	(South Korea) Chella Choi	72-73-72=217	+1
T10	(United States) Paula Creamer	73-72-72=217	+1
T10	(United States) Michelle Wie	75-70-72=217	+1

=== Final round ===
Sunday, 16 September 2012 (afternoon)

Place	Player	Score	To par	Money ($)
1	(South Korea) Jiyai Shin	71-64-71-73=279	−9	428,650
2	(South Korea) Inbee Park	72-68-72-76=288	E	249,668
3	(United States) Paula Creamer	73-72-72-72=289	+1	174,768
4	(Japan) Mika Miyazato	71-70-72-77=290	+2	136,724
T5	(South Korea) So Yeon Ryu	70-74-71-76=291	+3	104,623
T5	(Australia) Karrie Webb	71-70-68-82=291	+3	104,623
7	(Paraguay) Julieta Granada	74-71-74-74=293	+5	87,979
T8	(United States) Katie Futcher	71-71-73-79=294	+6	76,090
T8	(United States) Stacy Lewis	74-70-76-74=294	+6	76,090
T10	(South Korea) Chella Choi	72-73-72-78=295	+7	59,841
T10	(South Korea) I.K. Kim	75-72-73-75=295	+7	59,841
T10	(Scotland) Catriona Matthew	76-73-71-75=295	+7	59,841

Amateurs: Ko (+9), Clyburn (+11), Law (+12), Yan (+16).

==== Scorecard ====
Final round

Hole	1	2	3	4	5	6	7	8	9	10	11	12	13	14	15	16	17	18
Par	4	4	4	4	5	3	4	4	3	5	4	4	3	4	3	5	4	5
(South Korea) Shin	−7	−7	−7	−7	−7	−8	−9	−8	−8	−8	−7	−7	−8	−8	−9	−10	−9	−9
(South Korea) Park	−3	−3	−1	−1	−1	−1	−1	E	E	+1	+1	+2	+2	+2	+2	+1	+1	E
(United States) Creamer	+1	+1	+2	+2	+2	+2	+2	+2	+2	+3	+4	+4	+4	+5	+4	+2	+2	+1
(Japan) Miyazato	−2	−2	−2	−2	−2	−2	−2	−2	−2	−1	E	+2	+2	+2	+2	+1	+2	+2
(South Korea) Ryu	+2	+3	+3	+3	+3	+2	+3	+3	+3	+3	+3	+2	+2	+2	+1	+2	+3	+3
(Australia) Webb	−5	−4	−3	−3	−3	−2	−2	−2	−2	−2	−1	−1	−1	+1	E	+1	+3	+3

Cumulative tournament scores, relative to par

Eagle	Birdie	Bogey	Double bogey	Triple bogey+
