= 2006 Open Championship =

2006 golf tournament held at the Royal Liverpool Golf Club, Hoylake, Wirral, England

Coordinates: 53.385°N 3.190°W

- Front cover of the 2006 Open Annual

Tournament information
- Dates: 20–23 July 2006
- Location: Merseyside, England
- Course: Royal Liverpool Golf Club
- Organized by: The R&A
- Tour(s): European Tour; PGA Tour; Japan Golf Tour

Statistics
- Par: 72
- Length: 7,258 yards (6,637 m)
- Field: 156 players, 71 after cut
- Cut: 143 (−1)
- Prize fund: £4,000,000 €5,797,724 $7,300,000
- Winner's share: £720,000 €1,045,966 $1,338,480

Champion
- (United States) Tiger Woods
- 270 (−18)

Location in England
Royal Liverpool Golf Club in Hoylake, Merseyside,
west of Liverpool, England

The 2006 Open Championship was a men's major golf championship and the 135th Open Championship, played from 20 to 23 July at Royal Liverpool Golf Club. Tiger Woods held off Chris DiMarco, Ernie Els, Jim Furyk, and Sergio García for a two-shot victory. The win was his second consecutive Open Championship title and third overall. It was also Woods' first major tournament win since the death of his father, Earl Woods, in May.

The purse was £4,000,000, and the winner received £720,000. Using conversion rates at the time of the tournament, the purse was €5,797,724 for the European Tour's Order of Merit rankings and $7,300,000 for the PGA Tour's money list.

== History of The Open Championship at Royal Liverpool ==
Royal Liverpool first hosted The Open Championship in 1897 and the 2006 Open was the 11th to be held at Royal Liverpool. This was the first Open at Royal Liverpool since 1967, a thirty-nine-year absence. Royal Liverpool's list of champions includes Harold Hilton (1897), Sandy Herd (1902), Arnaud Massy (1907), John Henry Taylor (1913), 11-time major winner Walter Hagen (1924), seven-time major winner and amateur Bobby Jones, Alf Padgham (1936), Fred Daly (1947), Peter Thomson (1956), and Roberto De Vicenzo (1967).

== Course ==
Hole	Name	Yards	Par	Hole	Name	Yards	Par
1	17 - Royal	454	4	10	8 - Far	534	5
2	18 - Stand	436	4	11	9 - Punch Bowl	393	4
3	1 - Course	429	4	12	10 - Dee	448	4
4	2 - Road	372	4	13	11 - Alps	198	3
5	3 - Long	528	5	14	12 - Hilbre	456	4
6	4 - New	202	3	15	13 - Rushes	161	3
7	5 - Telegraph	453	4	16	14 - Field	554	5
8	6 - Briars	423	4	17	15 - Lake	459	4
9	7 - Dowie	198	3	18	16 - Dun	560	5
Out		3,495	35	In		3,763	37
				Total		7,258	72

Lengths of the course for previous Opens (since 1947):

- 1967: 6,995 yards (6,396 m), par 72
- 1956: 6,960 yards (6,364 m), par 71
- 1947: 6,978 yards (6,381 m), par 68

== Field ==
1. First 10 and anyone tying for 10th place in the 2005 Open Championship
Michael Campbell (3,4,9,17), Fred Couples (3,17), Sergio García (3,4,13), Retief Goosen (3,4,9,13,17), Bernhard Langer, Colin Montgomerie (3,4), Geoff Ogilvy (3,9), José María Olazábal (3,4), Vijay Singh (3,11,13,17), Tiger Woods (2,3,9,10,13,17)

2. Past Open Champions aged 65 or under on 23 July 2006
Seve Ballesteros, Mark Calcavecchia (21), Ben Curtis, John Daly, David Duval, Ernie Els (3,4), Nick Faldo, Todd Hamilton, Paul Lawrie, Tom Lehman (3), Sandy Lyle, Mark O'Meara, Tom Watson (26)

- Eligible but not competing: Ian Baker-Finch, Tony Jacklin, Justin Leonard (13,17), Johnny Miller, Greg Norman, Nick Price, Bill Rogers, Tom Weiskopf

3. The first 50 players on the OWGR for Week 22, 2006
Robert Allenby, Stephen Ames (12), Stuart Appleby (17), Thomas Bjørn (4), Bart Bryant (13), Ángel Cabrera (4,5,17), Chad Campbell (13), Paul Casey (6), K. J. Choi, Stewart Cink (17), Tim Clark (17), Darren Clarke (4), Ben Crane (13), Chris DiMarco (13,17), Luke Donald (4,13), Jim Furyk (9,13,17), Lucas Glover, Pádraig Harrington (13), Tim Herron, David Howell (4,5), Miguel Ángel Jiménez (4), Brandt Jobe, Zach Johnson, Shingo Katayama (22), Davis Love III (13,17), Paul McGinley (4), Phil Mickelson (10,11,13,17), Arron Oberholser (14), Nick O'Hern (17,19), Rod Pampling (14), Kenny Perry (13,17), Carl Pettersson, Rory Sabbatini (14), Adam Scott (12,13,17,19), Henrik Stenson (4), Scott Verplank (13,17), Mike Weir (10,17)

- Eligible but not competing: Trevor Immelman (17), David Toms (11,13,17)

4. First 20 in the European Tour Final Order of Merit for 2005
Stephen Dodd, Nick Dougherty, Bradley Dredge, Niclas Fasth, Kenneth Ferrie, Ian Poulter

5. The BMW Championship winners for 2004–06
Scott Drummond

6. First 3 and anyone tying for 3rd place, not exempt, in the top 20 of the European Tour Order of Merit for 2006 on completion of the 2006 BMW Championship
Paul Broadhurst, Johan Edfors

7. First 2 European Tour members and any European Tour members tying for 2nd place, not exempt, in a cumulative money list taken from all official European Tour events from the British Masters up to and including the Open de France and including The U.S. Open
John Bickerton, Robert Karlsson

8. The leading player, not exempt, in the first 10 and ties of each of the 2006 Open de France, 2006 European Open and the 2006 Scottish Open
Marcus Fraser, Andrés Romero, Anthony Wall

9. The U.S. Open Champions for 2002–06

10. The Masters Champions for 2002–06

11. The PGA Champions for 2001–05
Rich Beem, Shaun Micheel

12. The Players Champions for 2004–06
Fred Funk (13,17)

13. First 20 on the Official Money List of the PGA Tour for 2005
Sean O'Hair

14. First 3 and anyone tying for 3rd place, not exempt, in the top 20 of the Official Money List of the PGA Tour for 2006 on completion of the FedEx St. Jude Classic

15. First 2 PGA Tour members and any PGA Tour members tying for 2nd place, not exempt, in a cumulative money list taken from the Players Championship and the five PGA Tour events leading up to and including the 2006 Western Open
Billy Andrade, J. J. Henry

16. The leading player, not exempt having applied (15) above, in the first 10 and ties of each of the 2006 Buick Championship, the 2006 Western Open and the 2006 John Deere Classic
Mathew Goggin, Hunter Mahan, John Senden

17. Playing members of the 2005 Presidents Cup teams
Mark Hensby, Peter Lonard

18. First and anyone tying for 1st place on the Order of Merit of the Asian Tour for 2005
Thaworn Wiratchant

19. First 2 and anyone tying for 2nd place on the Order of Merit of the PGA Tour of Australasia for 2005

20. First and anyone tying for 1st place on the Order of Merit of the Sunshine Tour for 2005/2006
Charl Schwartzel

21. The Canadian Open Champion for 2005

22. The Japan Open Champion for 2005

23. First 2 and anyone tying for 2nd place, not exempt, on the Official Money List of the Japan Golf Tour for 2005
Keiichiro Fukabori, Yasuharu Imano

24. The leading 4 players, not exempt, in the 2006 Mizuno Open
Hur Suk-ho, Tatsuhiko Ichihara, Wayne Perske, David Smail

25. First 2 and anyone tying for 2nd place, not exempt having applied (24) above, in a cumulative money list taken from all official Japan Golf Tour events from the 2006 Japan PGA Championship up to and including the 2006 Mizuno Open
Toshinori Muto, Hideto Tanihara

26. The Senior Open Champion for 2005

27. The Amateur Champion for 2006
Julien Guerrier (a)

28. The U.S. Amateur Champion for 2005
Edoardo Molinari (a)

29. The European Amateur Champion for 2005
Marius Thorp (a)

International Final Qualifying

Africa: Warren Abery, Thomas Aiken, Bruce Vaughan, Ross Wellington
Australasia: Adam Bland, Ben Bunny, Bradley Hughes, Michael Wright
Asia: Shiv Kapur, Jarrod Lyle, Unho Park
America: Aaron Baddeley, Steve Elkington, J. B. Holmes, Jerry Kelly, Jeff Maggert, Greg Owen, Tom Pernice Jr., Ted Purdy, Brett Quigley, Vaughn Taylor, Bo Van Pelt, Lee Westwood, Brett Wetterich
Europe: Jamie Donaldson, Simon Dyson, Richard Green, Peter Hedblom, Søren Kjeldsen, Barry Lane, Sam Little, Graeme McDowell, Louis Oosthuizen, Mark Pilkington, Phillip Price, Robert Rock, Carlos Rodiles, Marco Ruiz, Brett Rumford, Lee Slattery, Richard Sterne, Simon Wakefield

Local Final Qualifying (Monday 10 July and Tuesday 11 July)

Conwy (Caernavonshire): Jon Bevan, Warren Bladon, Mikko Ilonen
Formby: Andrew Marshall, Darren Parris, Jim Payne
Wallasey: Markus Brier, Gary Day, Daniel Denison (a)
West Lancashire: Adam Frayne, Gary Lockerbie, Nick Ludwell

Alternates
The OWGR from 9 July was used to determine alternates. Four alternates gained places in the field:

- Simon Khan
- Andrew Buckle
- Gonzalo Fernández-Castaño
- Jeff Sluman

== Round summaries ==
=== First round ===
Thursday, 20 July 2006

Graeme McDowell of Northern Ireland was the opening round leader at 66, which broke the course record set by Roberto De Vicenzo in 1967. Defending champion Tiger Woods led a group of five others at 67. There were 67 rounds under par, with 32 rounds in the 60s, which broke the record of 59 sub-par rounds in the first round of the Open Championship at St Andrews in 1995 (the PGA Tour began keeping records in relation to par in 1956).

Place	Player	Score	To par
1	(Northern Ireland) Graeme McDowell	66	−6
T2	(United States) Tiger Woods	67	−5
T2	(England) Anthony Wall	67	−5
T2	(England) Greg Owen	67	−5
T2	(Spain) Miguel Ángel Jiménez	67	−5
T2	(Japan) Keiichiro Fukabori	67	−5
T7	(United States) Ben Crane	68	−4
T7	(South Africa) Ernie Els	68	−4
T7	(Australia) Marcus Fraser	68	−4
T7	(United States) Jim Furyk	68	−4
T7	(Spain) Sergio García	68	−4
T7	(Australia) Mark Hensby	68	−4
T7	(South Korea) Hur Suk-ho	68	−4
T7	(Finland) Mikko Ilonen	68	−4
T7	(United States) Tom Lehman	68	−4
T7	(Sweden) Carl Pettersson	68	−4
T7	(Australia) Brett Rumford	68	−4
T7	(Australia) Adam Scott	68	−4
T7	(Canada) Mike Weir	68	−4

=== Second round ===
Friday, 21 July 2006

Tiger Woods stormed into the lead at twelve-under with a 65 (−7), which included an eagle from 209 yards (191 m) on the 14th hole, one of the toughest holes at Royal Liverpool. Ernie Els also shot 65 and was one shot behind Woods, who was 6-0 when leading a major after 36 holes. Chris DiMarco, whose mother died suddenly of a heart attack 4 July, emerged from his slump with a 65 and was three shots behind at 135 (−9). Seventy-one players made the 36-hole cut at 143 (−1) or better.

Place	Player	Score	To par
1	(United States) Tiger Woods	67-65=132	−12
2	(South Africa) Ernie Els	68-65=133	−11
3	(United States) Chris DiMarco	70-65=135	−9
4	(South Africa) Retief Goosen	70-66=136	−8
T5	(Finland) Mikko Ilonen	68-69=137	−7
T5	(Spain) Miguel Ángel Jiménez	67-70=137	−7
T5	(Australia) Adam Scott	68-69=137	−7
8	(England) Robert Rock	69-69=138	−6
T9	(Australia) Robert Allenby	69-70=139	−5
T9	(Argentina) Ángel Cabrera	71-68=139	−5
T9	(United States) Mark Calcavecchia	71-68=139	−5
T9	(United States) Ben Crane	68-71=139	−5
T9	(Spain) Gonzalo Fernández-Castaño	70-69=139	−5
T9	(Australia) Marcus Fraser	68-71=139	−5
T9	(United States) Jim Furyk	68-71=139	−5
T9	(Spain) Sergio García	68-71=139	−5
T9	(United States) Jerry Kelly	72-67=139	−5
T9	(Northern Ireland) Graeme McDowell	66-73=139	−5
T9	(Australia) Brett Rumford	68-71=139	−5
T9	(South Africa) Rory Sabbatini	69-70=139	−5
T9	(Thailand) Thaworn Wiratchant	71-68=139	−5

Amateurs: Thorp (−2), Molinari (−1), Guerrier (+3), Denison (+10).

=== Third round ===
Saturday, 22 July 2006

Moving day ended with Tiger Woods still holding a one-shot lead, but with three golfers right on his heels. Ernie Els, in the final pairing, matched Woods with an identical 71. Chris DiMarco and Sergio García were also within one shot. García holed out a 9-iron from 167 yards (153 m) for eagle on the second hole, and took only 29 shots on the outward nine to finish with a seven-under 65.

Place	Player	Score	To par
1	(United States) Tiger Woods	67-65-71=203	−13
T2	(United States) Chris DiMarco	70-65-69=204	−12
T2	(South Africa) Ernie Els	68-65-71=204	−12
T2	(Spain) Sergio García	68-71-65=204	−12
T5	(Argentina) Ángel Cabrera	71-68-66=205	−11
T5	(United States) Jim Furyk	68-71-66=205	−11
7	(Japan) Hideto Tanihara	72-68-66=206	−10
T8	(United States) Mark Calcavecchia	71-68-68=207	−9
T8	(Australia) Adam Scott	68-69-70=207	−9
T10	(Australia) Robert Allenby	69-70-69=208	−8
T10	(South Africa) Retief Goosen	70-66-72=208	−8
T10	(United States) Jerry Kelly	72-67-69=208	−8
T10	(Australia) Peter Lonard	71-69-68=208	−8
T10	(England) Greg Owen	67-73-68=208	−8
T10	(Argentina) Andrés Romero	70-70-68=208	−8

=== Final round ===
Sunday, 23 July 2006

Woods fought off three of the best golfers in the world to win his third Open Championship title. While Els and García faded, DiMarco made a gritty rally to close with a 68 for a solo runner-up finish, two strokes back. After the clinching putt, Woods buried his head in the shoulder of caddie Steve Williams and sobbed uncontrollably, having won his first major since the passing of his father Earl Woods two months earlier. On the way to victory, Woods hit 86 percent of fairways. Woods became the first player since Tom Watson in 1982–83 to win golf's oldest championship in consecutive years. Woods improved his perfect record in majors to 11-0 when entering the final round with at least a share of the lead.

Place	Player	Score	To par	Money (£)
1	(United States) Tiger Woods	67-65-71-67=270	−18	720,000
2	(United States) Chris DiMarco	70-65-69-68=272	−16	430,000
3	(South Africa) Ernie Els	68-65-71-71=275	−13	275,000
4	(United States) Jim Furyk	68-71-66-71=276	−12	210,000
T5	(Spain) Sergio García	68-71-65-73=277	−11	159,500
T5	(Japan) Hideto Tanihara	72-68-66-71=277	−11	159,500
7	(Argentina) Ángel Cabrera	71-68-66-73=278	−10	128,025
T8	(Sweden) Carl Pettersson	68-72-70-69=279	−9	95,350
T8	(Argentina) Andrés Romero	70-70-68-71=279	−9	95,350
T8	(Australia) Adam Scott	68-69-70-72=279	−9	95,350

Amateurs: Thorp (E), Molinari (+7).

==== Scorecard ====
Final round

Hole	1	2	3	4	5	6	7	8	9	10	11	12	13	14	15	16	17	18
Par	4	4	4	4	5	3	4	4	3	5	4	4	3	4	3	5	4	5
(United States) Woods	−13	−13	−13	−13	−15	−15	−15	−15	−15	−16	−16	−15	−15	−16	−17	−18	−18	−18
(United States) DiMarco	−11	−11	−11	−11	−11	−12	−12	−12	−12	−13	−13	−13	−14	−14	−14	−15	−15	−16
(South Africa) Els	−12	−12	−12	−12	−13	−13	−13	−12	−12	−12	−11	−11	−11	−12	−12	−13	−13	−13
(United States) Furyk	−10	−9	−9	−9	−9	−9	−8	−8	−8	−9	−9	−9	−9	−9	−10	−11	−11	−12
(Spain) García	−12	−11	−10	−10	−10	−10	−10	−9	−8	−8	−8	−9	−9	−8	−9	−11	−11	−11
(Japan) Tanihara	−10	−11	−11	−11	−10	−8	−8	−8	−9	−9	−9	−10	−10	−11	−11	−12	−11	−11

Cumulative tournament scores, relative to par
