= George Pulford =

English golfer

Personal information
- Full name: John George Pulford
- Nationality: England
- Born: 1873 Hoylake, Cheshire, England
- Died: Unknown

Career
- Sport: Golf
- Status: Professional

Best results in major championships
- Masters Tournament: DNP
- PGA Championship: DNP
- U.S. Open: DNP
- The Open Championship: T3: 1897, 1907

John George Pulford (born 1873) was an English professional golfer. His skill on the links enabled him to place high on the leaderboard in several Open Championships. He finished tied for third in both the 1897 Open Championship and the 1907 Open Championship. He was fourth in the 1895 Open Championship and was tied for tenth place in the 1909 Open Championship.

== Early life ==
Pulford was born in Hoylake, Cheshire, England in 1873, the eldest child of George and Ann (nee Meadows).

== Golf career ==
=== 1895 Open Championship ===
The 1895 Open Championship was the held 12–13 June at the Old Course at St Andrews, Fife, Scotland. Defending champion J.H. Taylor won the Championship for the second time, by four strokes from runner-up Sandy Herd. Pulford played steady golf throughout the event and finished alone in fourth place.

=== 1897 Open Championship ===
The 1897 Open Championship was held 19–20 May at Royal Liverpool Golf Club in Hoylake, England. Harold Hilton, an amateur, won the Championship for the second time, a stroke ahead of James Braid. As an amateur Hilton received "£30 in plate" in addition to the "Championship Cup" and "Gold Medal". The prize money for the professionals was reduced accordingly to £60. This arrangement had been introduced after the 1892 Open Championship which was also won by Hilton.

==== Details of play ====
This was the second Open to be played in England after the 1894 event staged at Royal St George's. It was also the last Open Championship with no qualifying and no cut. 88 players entered including 20 amateurs. Royal Liverpool was the home club of many of the leading amateurs of the day including John Ball, Jr. and Hilton, both of whom had already won the Championship. The great masters of the game—Harry Vardon and J.H. Taylor—both played poorly in the tournament shooting scores of 84-80-80-76=320 and 82-80-82-86=330, respectively. Taylor's performance was especially dismal, as his final round 86 was 3 shots or more worse than all other players in the top 10. Pulford played impressively, and consistently, carding rounds of 80-79-79-79=317 and was rewarded for his excellent play with the handy sum of £10.

=== 1907 Open Championship ===
The 1907 Open Championship was held 20–21 June at Royal Liverpool Golf Club in Hoylake, England. Arnaud Massy, from France, won the Championship, two strokes ahead of runner-up J.H. Taylor. Massy was the first non-Briton to win the Open Championship. Returning to the good form that he had exhibited in previous Open Championships in 1895 and 1897, Pulford once again claimed a lofty perch on the leaderboard finishing in a tie for third place.

== Results in major championships ==
Tournament	1894	1895	1896	1897	1898	1899	1900	1901	1902	1903	1904	1905	1906	1907	1908	1909	1910	1911	1912	1913
The Open Championship	WD	4	WD	T3	T13	WD	DNP	DNP	22	T18	WD	CUT	T30	T3	T18	T10	WD	DNP	DNP	WD

Note: Pulford only played in The Open Championship.

DNP = Did not play
CUT = Missed the half-way cut
WD = Withdrew
Yellow background for top-10

== Team appearances ==
- England–Scotland Professional Match (representing England): 1904 (tie), 1907 (winners)
