= Yoshimitsu Fukuzawa =

Japanese golfer (born 1963)

Personal information
- Nationality: Japan
- Born: 24 November 1963 (age 62) Tokyo, Japan
- Height: 1.67 m (5 ft 6 in)
- Weight: 62 kg (137 lb; 9.8 st)

Career
- Sport: Golf
- Status: Professional
- Former tour: Japan Golf Tour
- Professional wins: 2

Number of wins by tour
- Japan Golf Tour: 1
- Other: 1

Yoshimitsu Fukuzawa (福沢 義光, Fukuzawa Yoshimitsu; born 24 November 1963) is a Japanese professional golfer.

== Career ==
Fukuzawa played on the Japan Golf Tour, winning once.

== Professional wins (2) ==
=== Japan Golf Tour wins (1) ===
No.	Date	Tournament	Winning score	Margin of victory	Runner-up
1	17 Jun 2001	Tamanoi Yomiuri Open	−16 (64-70-70-68=272)	Playoff	(Japan) Toru Suzuki

Japan Golf Tour playoff record (1–1)

No.	Year	Tournament	Opponent(s)	Result
1	2001	Tamanoi Yomiuri Open	(Japan) Toru Suzuki	Won with par on first extra hole
2	2002	Munsingwear Open KSB Cup	(United States) Todd Hamilton, (Japan) Kenichi Kuboya	Kuboya won with birdie on fourth extra hole Fukuzawa eliminated by birdie on second hole

=== Japan Challenge Tour wins (1) ===
No.	Date	Tournament	Winning score	Margin of victory	Runner-up
1	21 Sep 2000	Aiful Challenge Cup Autumn	−9 (65-70=135)	3 strokes	(Japan) Jun Kikuchi
