= Todd Hamilton =

American professional golfer (born 1965)

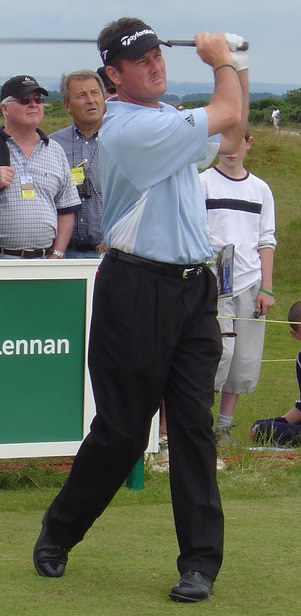

Personal information
- Full name: William Todd Hamilton
- Nationality: United States
- Born: October 18, 1965 (age 61) Galesburg, Illinois, U.S.
- Height: 6 ft 1 in (185 cm)
- Weight: 195 lb (88 kg; 13.9 st)
- Children: 3

Career
- Sport: Golf
- College: University of Oklahoma
- Turned professional: 1987
- Current tour: Champions Tour
- Former tours: PGA Tour; Japan Golf Tour; Asia Golf Circuit
- Professional wins: 17
- Highest ranking: 16 (July 18, 2004)

Number of wins by tour
- PGA Tour: 2
- European Tour: 1
- Japan Golf Tour: 11
- Other: 4

Best results in major championships (wins: 1)
- Masters Tournament: T15: 2009
- PGA Championship: T29: 2003
- U.S. Open: T36: 2008, 2009
- The Open Championship: Won: 2004

Achievements and awards
- Asia Golf Circuit Order of Merit winner: 1992
- PGA Tour Rookie of the Year: 2004

William Todd Hamilton (born October 18, 1965) is an American professional golfer. He is best known for his victory at the 2004 Open Championship.

== Early life ==
Hamilton was born in the small west-central Illinois city of Galesburg. He grew up in an even smaller town, Oquawka, in Henderson County on the Mississippi River. His parents were the owners of a small grocery story called "Hamilton's." He attended Union High School in Biggsville, Illinois (now West Central High School). At the time, the high school did not have a golf team, and Hamilton competed as an individual. He won back to back Class A state titles in 1981–82 and 1982–83. Hamilton then played at the University of Oklahoma, where he was a college All-American.

== Professional career ==
Hamilton turned professional in 1987 but was unable to gain entrance to the PGA Tour. Instead he played internationally for many years, primarily on the Japan Golf Tour after gaining his card as winner of the 1992 Asia Golf Circuit Order of Merit winner. When he left the Japan Golf Tour after 12 seasons, he was the tour's 2nd all-time leading non-Japanese money winner (to USA's David Ishii), with earnings of over 630 million yen (about $6.18 million in 2014 US dollars) with 11 tour wins.

After eight tries, at the age of 38, Hamilton went back to Qualifying School in 2003, where he finally earned his first PGA Tour card.

Hamilton captured his first PGA Tour win at the 2004 Honda Classic. He birdied the final two holes to beat Davis Love III by one stroke at 12 under par. Later that year, he won a major championship in one of golf's all-time upsets when he defeated Ernie Els in a four-hole playoff to win The Open Championship at Royal Troon Golf Club. After shooting an opening round 71, he fired a second round 67 to move to -4 and a fifth-place tie with future World Golf Hall of Famers Els, Vijay Singh and Colin Montgomerie as well as future US Open winner Michael Campbell. He again shot a 67 in the third round to take a one-shot lead over Els. Entering the tournament's 72nd hole, he held a one-shot lead over Els but bogeyed, leaving Els with a 12-foot birdie putt for the win, which he missed. Els and Hamilton headed for the four-hole aggregate playoff, in which Hamilton carded four pars while Els managed three pars and a bogey, and Hamilton took the win.

These two victories in his first season on the PGA Tour led to Hamilton being named the 2004 PGA Tour Rookie of the Year and reaching a peak world ranking of 16. In his 187 subsequent tour starts, he missed the cut 111 times and had just three top-10 finishes. In 2006, Hamilton captained the American team in ITV's celebrity golf tournament, the All*Star Cup.

He lost his full exempt status on the PGA Tour in 2010. Hamilton played on the Web.com Tour in 2014 and 2015. Hamilton became eligible to play on the Champions Tour after turning fifty years of age in October 2015.

== Personal life ==
Hamilton lives in Westlake, Texas.

== Professional wins (17) ==
=== PGA Tour wins (2) ===
Legend
Major championships (1)
Other PGA Tour (1)

No.	Date	Tournament	Winning score	Margin of victory	Runner-up
1	Mar 14, 2004	The Honda Classic	−12 (68-66-68-74=276)	1 stroke	(United States) Davis Love III
2	Jul 18, 2004	The Open Championship	−10 (71-67-67-69=274)	Playoff	(South Africa) Ernie Els

PGA Tour playoff record (1–0)

No.	Year	Tournament	Opponent	Result
1	2004	The Open Championship	(South Africa) Ernie Els	Won four-hole aggregate playoff; Hamilton: E (4-4-3-4=15), Els: +1 (4-4-4-4=16)

=== Japan Golf Tour wins (11) ===
No.	Date	Tournament	Winning score	Margin of victory	Runner(s)-up
1	Aug 23, 1992	Maruman Open	−16 (65-67-67-73=272)	1 stroke	(Japan) Masashi Ozaki
2	Aug 15, 1993	Acom International	40 pts (7-15-3-15=40)	2 points	(Australia) Craig Warren
3	Jul 3, 1994	PGA Philanthropy Tournament	−10 (74-69-68-67=278)	Playoff	(Japan) Eiji Mizoguchi
4	Sep 4, 1994	Japan PGA Match-Play Championship Promise Cup	8 and 7		(Japan) Ikuo Shirahama
5	Mar 12, 1995	Token Corporation Cup	−7 (70-71-68-72=281)	1 stroke	(Australia) Peter Senior
6	Jun 30, 1996	PGA Philanthropy Tournament (2)	−13 (69-69-68-69=275)	2 strokes	(Japan) Kazuhiro Takami
7	Sep 27, 1998	Gene Sarazen Jun Classic	−18 (71-66-68-65=270)	2 strokes	(Australia) Craig Parry
8	May 11, 2003	Fujisankei Classic	−17 (67-67-65-68=267)	5 strokes	(Japan) Tetsuji Hiratsuka, (Japan) Shigeru Nonaka
9	Jun 1, 2003	Diamond Cup Tournament	−12 (67-72-72-65=276)	3 strokes	(Australia) Steven Conran
10	Jun 29, 2003	Gateway to The Open Mizuno Open	−10 (67-72-72-65=278)	1 stroke	(Australia) Brendan Jones
11	Sep 7, 2003	Japan PGA Match-Play Championship (2)	3 and 2		(New Zealand) David Smail

Japan Golf Tour playoff record (1–4)

No.	Year	Tournament	Opponent(s)	Result
1	1994	PGA Philanthropy Tournament	(Japan) Eiji Mizoguchi	Won with birdie on first extra hole
2	1996	Fujisankei Classic	(United States) Brian Watts	Lost to par on first extra hole
3	1996	Mitsubishi Galant Tournament	(Japan) Masashi Ozaki	Lost to par on first extra hole
4	1996	Pocari Sweat Yomiuri Open	(Japan) Kazuhiro Fukunaga	Lost to birdie on second extra hole
4	2002	Munsingwear Open KSB Cup	(Japan) Yoshimitsu Fukuzawa, (Japan) Kenichi Kuboya	Kuboya won with birdie on fourth extra hole Fukuzawa eliminated by birdie on second hole

=== Asia Golf Circuit wins (2) ===
No.	Date	Tournament	Winning score	Margin of victory	Runner-up
1	Apr 19, 1992	Maekyung Open	−8 (68-70-69-73=280)	Playoff	(Taiwan) Lin Chie-hsiang
2	Feb 5, 1995	Thai Airways Thailand Open	−17 (68-68-70-65=271)	Playoff	(United States) Steve Veriato

Asia Golf Circuit playoff record (2–1)

No.	Year	Tournament	Opponent(s)	Result
1	1992	Sanyang Republic of China Open	(Taiwan) Lin Chie-hsiang, (United States) Craig McClellan	Lin won with birdie on first extra hole
2	1992	Maekyung Open	(Taiwan) Lin Chie-hsiang	Won with par on first extra hole
3	1995	Thai Airways Thailand Open	(United States) Steve Veriato	Won with par on second extra hole

=== Other wins (2) ===
No.	Date	Tournament	Winning score	Margin of victory	Runner(s)-up
1	Mar 22, 1992	Rolex Masters	−10 (70-67-66-71=274)	4 strokes	(United States) Gerry Norquist, (United States) Lee Porter
2	Aug 29, 1999	Oklahoma Open	−12 (66-68-64=198)	1 stroke	(United States) Greg Gregory

== Major championships ==
=== Wins (1) ===
Year	Championship	54 holes	Winning score	Margin	Runner-up
2004	The Open Championship	1 shot lead	−10 (71-67-67-69=274)	Playoff^{1}	(South Africa) Ernie Els

^{1}Defeated Ernie Els in 4-hole playoff; Hamilton (4-4-3-4=15), Els (4-4-4-4=16).

=== Results timeline ===
Tournament	1988	1989
Masters Tournament		
U.S. Open	CUT	
The Open Championship		
PGA Championship		

Tournament	1990	1991	1992	1993	1994	1995	1996	1997	1998	1999
Masters Tournament										
U.S. Open										
The Open Championship			CUT				T45			
PGA Championship										

Tournament	2000	2001	2002	2003	2004	2005	2006	2007	2008	2009
Masters Tournament					40	T39	CUT	CUT	T36	T15
U.S. Open					CUT	CUT	CUT	CUT	T36	T36
The Open Championship				CUT	1	CUT	T68	CUT	T32	CUT
PGA Championship				T29	T37	T47	CUT	T66	CUT	

Tournament	2010	2011	2012	2013	2014	2015	2016	2017	2018
Masters Tournament	CUT								
U.S. Open		T60							
The Open Championship	CUT	CUT	CUT	T73	CUT	CUT	CUT	CUT	CUT
PGA Championship									

Tournament	2019	2020	2021	2022	2023	2024
Masters Tournament						
PGA Championship						
U.S. Open						
The Open Championship		NT				CUT

Win
Did not play

CUT = missed the half way cut
"T" indicates a tie for a place.
NT = no tournament due to the COVID-19 pandemic

=== Summary ===
Tournament	Wins	2nd	3rd	Top-5	Top-10	Top-25	Events	Cuts made
Masters Tournament	0	0	0	0	0	1	7	4
U.S. Open	0	0	0	0	0	0	8	3
The Open Championship	1	0	0	1	1	1	19	5
PGA Championship	0	0	0	0	0	0	6	4
Totals	1	0	0	1	1	2	40	16

- Most consecutive cuts made – 4 (2007 PGA – 2008 Open Championship)
- Longest streak of top-10s – 1

== Results in The Players Championship ==
Tournament	2004	2005	2006	2007	2008	2009
The Players Championship	T58	CUT	CUT	T75	T54	CUT

CUT = missed the halfway cut
"T" indicates a tie for a place

== Results in World Golf Championships ==
Tournament	2003	2004	2005
Match Play			R64
Championship	72	T6	
Invitational		21	

Top 10
Did not play

QF, R16, R32, R64 = Round in which player lost in match play
"T" = Tied

== Results in senior major championships ==
Results not in chronological order before 2017.

Tournament	2016	2017	2018	2019	2020	2021	2022	2023	2024	2025
The Tradition	T23	T40	T48		NT					
Senior PGA Championship	CUT	CUT	T33	CUT	NT	CUT	CUT	CUT	CUT	CUT
Senior Players Championship	T61	T63	49							
U.S. Senior Open	T37		T40	CUT	NT					
Senior British Open Championship	CUT	T61	CUT		NT					

Did not play

"T" indicates a tie for a place
CUT = missed the halfway cut
NT = no tournament due to COVID-19 pandemic

== See also ==
- 2003 PGA Tour Qualifying School graduates
- List of golfers with most Japan Golf Tour wins
