= 1967 Open Championship =

1967 golf tournament held at the Royal Liverpool Golf Club, Hoylake, Wirral, England

Coordinates: 53.3875°N 3.185°W

Tournament information
- Dates: 12–15 July 1967
- Location: Merseyside, England
- Course: Royal Liverpool Golf Club

Statistics
- Par: 72
- Length: 6,995 yards (6,396 m)
- Field: 130 players, 58 after cut
- Cut: 149 (+5)
- Prize fund: £15,000 $42,000
- Winner's share: £2,100 $5,880

Champion
- (Argentina) Roberto De Vicenzo
- 278 (−10)

Location in England

The 1967 Open Championship was the 96th Open Championship, played from 12 to 15 July at Royal Liverpool Golf Club, Hoylake. Roberto De Vicenzo, 44, won his only major championship, two strokes ahead of runner-up and defending champion Jack Nicklaus.

This was the last year until 1986 in which The Open had a single cut at 36 holes. From 1968 through 1985, a second cut was made after 54 holes.

The PGA Championship was played the next week near Denver, Colorado, one of five times in the 1960s that these two majors were played in consecutive weeks in July.

This was the last Open at Hoylake for 39 years, until 2006.

== Round summaries ==
=== First round ===
Wednesday, 12 July 1967

Place	Player	Score	To par
1	(England) Lionel Platts	68	−4
T2	(Scotland) David Bonthron	69	−3
T2	(Scotland) Jimmy Hume	69	−3
T2	(Wales) Peter Jones	69	−3
T2	(England) Jack Wilkshire	69	−3
T6	(England) Fred Boobyer	70	−2
T6	(United States) Gay Brewer	70	−2
T6	(England) Clive Clark	70	−2
T6	(Argentina) Roberto De Vicenzo	70	−2
T6	(Australia) Bruce Devlin	70	−2
T6	(South Africa) Barry Franklin	70	−2
T6	(Australia) Kel Nagle	70	−2
T6	(Republic of Ireland) Christy O'Connor Snr	70	−2

=== Second round ===
Thursday, 13 July 1967

Place	Player	Score	To par
T1	(Australia) Bruce Devlin	70-70=140	−4
T1	(United States) Jack Nicklaus	71-69=140	−4
T3	(England) Fred Boobyer	70-71=141	−3
T3	(Argentina) Roberto De Vicenzo	70-71=141	−3
T3	(Scotland) Jimmy Hume	69-72=141	−3
T3	(England) Lionel Platts	68-73=141	−3
7	(England) Tony Jacklin	73-69=142	−2
T8	(England) Clive Clark	70-73=143	−1
T8	(South Africa) Gary Player	72-71=143	−1
T10	(Scotland) David Bonthron	69-75=144	E
T10	(South Africa) Barry Franklin	70-74=144	E
T10	(South Africa) Harold Henning	74-70=144	E
T10	(Australia) Kel Nagle	70-74=144	E
T10	(Republic of Ireland) Christy O'Connor Snr	70-74=144	E
T10	(United States) Doug Sanders	71-73=144	E

Amateurs: Benka (+6), Howard (+7), Carr (+11), Falkenburg (+12), Sweeny Jnr (+12), Bonallack (+17), Broadbent (+17), Cosh (+30).

=== Third round ===
Friday, 14 July 1967

Place	Player	Score	To par
1	(Argentina) Roberto De Vicenzo	70-71-67=208	−8
2	(South Africa) Gary Player	72-71-67=210	−6
3	(United States) Jack Nicklaus	71-69-71=211	−5
T4	(England) Clive Clark	70-73-69=212	−4
T4	(Australia) Bruce Devlin	70-70-72=212	−4
T6	(Australia) Kel Nagle	70-74-69=213	−3
T6	(England) Lionel Platts	68-73-72=213	−3
T8	(Canada) Al Balding	74-71-69=214	−2
T8	(Scotland) Jimmy Hume	69-72-73=214	−2
T8	(Spain) Sebastián Miguel	72-74-68=214	−2

=== Final round ===
Saturday, 15 July 1967

Place	Player	Score	To par	Money (£)
1	(Argentina) Roberto De Vicenzo	70-71-67-70=278	−10	2,100
2	(United States) Jack Nicklaus	71-69-71-69=280	−8	1,500
T3	(England) Clive Clark	70-73-69-72=284	−4	1,125
T3	(South Africa) Gary Player	72-71-67-74=284	−4	1,125
5	(England) Tony Jacklin	73-69-73-70=285	−3	775
T6	(South Africa) Harold Henning	74-70-71-71=286	−2	575
T6	(Spain) Sebastián Miguel	72-74-68-72=286	−2	575
T8	(Canada) Al Balding	74-71-69-73=287	−1	330
T8	(Republic of Ireland) Hugh Boyle	74-74-71-68=287	−1	330
T8	(Australia) Bruce Devlin	70-70-72-75=287	−1	330
T8	(England) Tommy Horton	74-74-69-70=287	−1	330
T8	(Australia) Peter Thomson	71-74-70-72=287	−1	330
