= 1907 Open Championship =

1907 golf tournament held at the Royal Liverpool Golf Club, Hoylake, Wirral, England

Coordinates: 53.385°N 3.190°W

Tournament information
- Dates: 20–21 June 1907
- Location: Hoylake, England
- Course: Royal Liverpool Golf Club

Statistics
- Field: 67 players
- Cut: none
- Prize fund: £115
- Winner's share: £50

Champion
- (France) Arnaud Massy
- 312

Location in England
Royal Liverpool Golf Club in Hoylake, Merseyside, west of Liverpool, England

The 1907 Open Championship was the 47th Open Championship, held 20–21 June at Royal Liverpool Golf Club in Hoylake, England. Arnaud Massy won his only major title, two strokes ahead of runner-up J.H. Taylor. From France, Massy was the first non-Briton to win the Open Championship.

Qualifying was introduced for the first time, replacing the 36-hole cut. It took place on Tuesday and Wednesday, 18–19 June, and the 193 entries were divided into two "sections," with each playing 36 holes on one day; the leading thirty players and ties from each section qualified. On Tuesday, 34 players scoring 165 or better qualified, led by Massy on 147. In windier conditions on Wednesday, 33 players at 170 or better qualified, led by Taylor on 154. There was some feeling that those in the first section would benefit from the day's rest.

In a strong wind on Thursday morning, Massy and Walter Toogood were the co-leaders after the first round at 76, with the next closest score at 79. After the second round that afternoon, Massy led at 157, one stroke over Taylor and Tom Ball, with Tom Williamson and George Pulford a further shot behind.

The strong wind persisted into Friday. In the morning, Massy scored 78 while Taylor's 76 gave him a one shot lead. Harry Vardon's 74 was the best round of the championship and moved him into a tie for third place with Pulford and Ball, five strokes behind Taylor.

In the afternoon, Massy's 77 earned him the title at 312, two strokes ahead of Taylor, who scored 80 for 314. Taylor had some difficulties on the third hole where he sliced his drive into some long grass and took a seven, going out in 41. He came home in 39, but it wasn't enough to make up for his miscues on the front nine. Massy became the first overseas player to win the Open, while Taylor finished runner-up for the fourth successive time. Vardon's brother, Tom, made a powerful move up the leaderboard with a 75 in the final round to secure a tie for third.

== Round summaries ==
=== First round ===
Thursday, 20 June 1907 (morning)

Place	Player	Score
T1	(France) Arnaud Massy	76
T1	(England) Walter Toogood	76
T3	(Scotland) Willie McEwan	79
T3	(England) J.H. Taylor	79
T5	(England) Tom Ball	80
T5	(Scotland) James Hepburn	80
T7	(England) George Pulford	81
T7	(Jersey) Tom Vardon	81
T9	(Scotland) James Braid	82
T9	(England) Alfred Matthews	82
T9	(England) Tom Williamson	82

=== Second round ===
Thursday, 20 June 1907 (afternoon)

Place	Player	Score
1	(France) Arnaud Massy	76-81=157
T2	(England) Tom Ball	80-78=158
T2	(England) J.H. Taylor	79-79=158
T4	(England) George Pulford	81-78=159
T4	(England) Tom Williamson	82-77=159
6	(Scotland) George Duncan	83-78=161
T7	(England) Alfred Matthews	82-80=162
T7	(England) Walter Toogood	76-86=162
T7	(Jersey) Tom Vardon	81-81=162
T10	(Jersey) Ted Ray	83-80=163
T10	(Jersey) Thomas Renouf	83-80=163

=== Third round ===
Friday, 21 June 1907 (morning)

Place	Player	Score
1	(England) J.H. Taylor	79-79-76=234
2	(France) Arnaud Massy	76-81-78=235
T3	(England) Tom Ball	80-78-81=239
T3	(England) George Pulford	81-78-80=239
T3	(Jersey) Harry Vardon	84-81-74=239
6	(England) Tom Williamson	82-77-82=241
T7	(Scotland) James Braid	82-85-75=242
T7	(Scotland) George Duncan	83-78-81=242
T7	(Jersey) Ted Ray	83-80-79=242
T7	(Jersey) Tom Vardon	81-81-80=242

=== Final round ===
Friday, 21 June 1907 (afternoon)

Place	Player	Score	Money (£)
1	(France) Arnaud Massy	76-81-78-77=312	50
2	(England) J.H. Taylor	79-79-76-80=314	25
T3	(England) George Pulford	81-78-80-78=317	12; 10s
T3	(Jersey) Tom Vardon	81-81-80-75=317	12; 10s
T5	(Scotland) James Braid	82-85-75-76=318	7; 10s
T5	(Jersey) Ted Ray	83-80-79-76=318	7; 10s
T7	(Scotland) George Duncan	83-78-81-77=319	0
T7	(Jersey) Harry Vardon	84-81-74-80=319	0
T7	(England) Tom Williamson	82-77-82-78=319	0
10	(England) Tom Ball	80-78-81-81=320	0
