= Kenichi Kuboya =

Japanese professional golfer

Kenichi Kuboya 久保谷 健一
Personal information
- Nationality: Japan
- Born: 11 March 1972 (age 54) Kanagawa Prefecture, Japan
- Height: 1.74 m (5 ft 9 in)
- Weight: 70 kg (154 lb; 11 st 0 lb)

Career
- Sport: Golf
- College: Meiji University
- Turned professional: 1995
- Current tour: Japan Golf Tour
- Former tour: PGA Tour
- Professional wins: 7
- Highest ranking: 73 (22 November 2009)

Number of wins by tour
- Japan Golf Tour: 7
- Asian Tour: 1

Best results in major championships
- Masters Tournament: DNP
- PGA Championship: DNP
- U.S. Open: T68: 2011
- The Open Championship: T27: 2009

Kenichi Kuboya (Japanese: 久保谷 健一, born 11 March 1972) is a Japanese professional golfer.

== Career ==
Kuboya won four events on the Japan Golf Tour between 1997 and 2002, picking up two wins in each of those seasons.

Both of Kuboya's wins on the Japan Golf Tour in 2002 came in playoffs against seasoned campaigners. He beat Shingo Katayama in extra holes at the Japan PGA Championship and another win against former Open champion Todd Hamilton at the Munsingwear Open KSB Cup. This remains the biggest win of his career.

Kuboya had a brief stint on the PGA Tour where he played a full season in 2003. His best finish of the year was a T13 at the 84 Lumber Classic of Pennsylvania and he was not able to keep his card. He would go back to play on the Japan Golf Tour in 2004, where he currently plays.

Kuboya played in his first major championship in 2002 at The Open Championship, where he made the cut, but did not contend on the weekend. His next major was the 2009 Open Championship at Turnberry in Scotland. He finished his first round birdie, birdie, eagle, birdie to finish in a tie for second. He would finish the tournament tied for 27th.

Kuboya won his fifth Japan Golf Tour title at the 2011 Canon Open, nine years after his last win and subsequently won the 2012 Japan Open and the 2017 Panasonic Open.

== Professional wins (7) ==
=== Japan Golf Tour wins (7) ===
Legend
Flagship events (1)
Japan majors (2) (Note: The 2012 Japan Open Golf Championship was also a Japan major championship.)
Other Japan Golf Tour (6)

| No. | Date | Tournament | Winning score | Margin of victory | Runner(s)-up |
|---|---|---|---|---|---|
| 1 | 11 May 1997 | Fujisankei Classic | –5 (68-69-73-69=279) | 1 stroke | (Japan) Yoshinori Kaneko, (Japan) Masashi Ozaki |
| 2 | 14 Dec 1997 | Daikyo Open | –21 (66-64-68-65=263) | 1 stroke | (Japan) Katsunori Kuwabara, (United States) Brian Watts |
| 3 | 19 May 2002 | Japan PGA Championship | –9 (74-70-68-67=279) | Playoff | (Japan) Shingo Katayama |
| 4 | 26 May 2002 | Munsingwear Open KSB Cup | –11 (66-70-68-69=273) | Playoff | (Japan) Yoshimitsu Fukuzawa, (United States) Todd Hamilton |
| 5 | 9 Oct 2011 | Canon Open | –14 (68-67-70-69=274) | 5 strokes | (Australia) Brad Kennedy, (Japan) Mamo Osanai, (Thailand) Chawalit Plaphol |
| 6 | 14 Oct 2012 | Japan Open Golf Championship | +8 (74-73-75-70=292) | 1 stroke | (Philippines) Juvic Pagunsan |
| 7 | 23 Apr 2017 | Panasonic Open Golf Championship^{1} | –11 (69-71-69-64=273) | Playoff | (Japan) Katsumasa Miyamoto |

^{1}Co-sanctioned by the Asian Tour

Japan Golf Tour playoff record (3–1)

| No. | Year | Tournament | Opponent(s) | Result |
|---|---|---|---|---|
| 1 | 2002 | Japan PGA Championship | (Japan) Shingo Katayama | Won with birdie on second extra hole |
| 2 | 2002 | Munsingwear Open KSB Cup | (Japan) Yoshimitsu Fukuzawa, (United States) Todd Hamilton | Won with birdie on fourth extra hole Fukuzawa eliminated by birdie on second hole |
| 3 | 2011 | Japan Open Golf Championship | (South Korea) Bae Sang-moon | Lost to par on first extra hole |
| 4 | 2017 | Panasonic Open Golf Championship | (Japan) Katsumasa Miyamoto | Won after concession on first extra hole |

== Results in major championships ==
| Tournament | 2002 | 2003 | 2004 | 2005 | 2006 | 2007 | 2008 | 2009 | 2010 | 2011 | 2012 | 2013 |
|---|---|---|---|---|---|---|---|---|---|---|---|---|
| Masters Tournament | | | | | | | | | | | | |
| U.S. Open | | | | | | | | | | T68 | | |
| The Open Championship | T59 | | | | | | | T27 | | | | CUT |
| PGA Championship | | | | | | | | | | | | |

Did not play

CUT = missed the half-way cut
"T" = tied

== Results in World Golf Championships ==
| Tournament | 2002 | 2003 | 2004 | 2005 | 2006 | 2007 | 2008 | 2009 | 2010 | 2011 | 2012 |
|---|---|---|---|---|---|---|---|---|---|---|---|
| Match Play | | | | | | | | | | | |
| Championship | 64 | | | | | | | | | | |
| Invitational | | | | | | | | | | | |
| Champions | | | | | | | | | | | T69 |

Did not play

"T" = Tied

== See also ==
- 2002 PGA Tour Qualifying School graduates
