= Munsingwear Open KSB Cup =

Tournament information
- Location: Tamano, Okayama, Japan
- Established: 2000
- Course: Tojigaoka Marine Hills Golf Club
- Par: 72
- Length: 7,072 yards (6,467 m)
- Tour: Japan Golf Tour
- Format: Stroke play
- Prize fund: ¥100,000,000
- Month played: May
- Final year: 2008

Tournament record score
- Aggregate: 270 Tatsuya Mitsuhashi (2004); 270 Hiroyuki Fujita (2005); 270 Hideto Tanihara (2008)
- To par: −18 as above

Final champion
- (Japan) Hideto Tanihara

Location map
- Location in Japan Location in the Okayama Prefecture

The Munsingwear Open KSB Cup was a professional golf tournament on the Japan Golf Tour. It was created in 2000 as a result of the merger of two previous tournaments, the Georgia KSB Open and the Descente Classic Munsingwear Cup.

The Georgia KSB Open started in 1989, and the Descente Classic Munsingwear Cup started in 1992. From 2004, the tournament was played at the Tojigaoka Marine Hills Golf Club near Tamano, Okayama. The purse for 2008 was ¥100,000,000, with ¥20,000,000 going to the winner.

At the 2007 Munsingwear Open KSB Cup, Ryo Ishikawa, an amateur, became the youngest ever winner on the Japan Golf Tour, aged 15 years and 8 months.

== Tournament hosts ==
Year(s)	Host course	Location
2000, 2004–2008	Tojigaoka Marine Hills Golf Club	Tamano, Okayama
2001, 2003	Rokko Kokusai Golf Club	Kobe, Hyōgo
2002	Ayutaki Country Club	Takamatsu, Kagawa

== Winners ==
Year	Winner	Score	To par	Margin of victory	Runner(s)-up
2008	(Japan) Hideto Tanihara	270	−18	3 strokes	(Japan) Shingo Katayama (Japan) Katsunori Kuwabara (Japan) Nobuhito Sato
2007	(Japan) Ryo Ishikawa (a)	276	−12	1 stroke	(Japan) Katsumasa Miyamoto
2006	(Japan) Toshinori Muto	274	−14	2 strokes	(Japan) Eiji Mizoguchi
2005	(Japan) Hiroyuki Fujita	270	−18	3 strokes	(Australia) Steven Conran (Japan) Tadahiro Takayama
2004	(Japan) Tatsuya Mitsuhashi	270	−18	2 strokes	(Japan) Shingo Katayama (Japan) Nobuhiro Masuda (India) Jeev Milkha Singh
2003	(Japan) Hirofumi Miyase	275	−13	3 strokes	(South Korea) Hur Suk-ho
2002	(Japan) Kenichi Kuboya	273	−11	Playoff	(Japan) Yoshimitsu Fukuzawa (United States) Todd Hamilton
2001	(Fiji) Dinesh Chand	271	−17	2 strokes	(Japan) Toshimitsu Izawa
2000	(Japan) Shingo Katayama	272	−16	1 stroke	(Japan) Nobuhito Sato
