= 1897 Open Championship =

1897 golf tournament held at the Royal Liverpool Golf Club, Hoylake, Wirral, England

Coordinates: 53.385°N 3.190°W

Tournament information
- Dates: 19–20 May 1897
- Location: Hoylake, England
- Course: Royal Liverpool Golf Club

Statistics
- Length: 6,043 yards (5,526 m)
- Field: 88 players
- Cut: none
- Prize fund: £90
- Winner's share: £30

Champion
- (England) Harold Hilton (a)
- 314

Location in England

The 1897 Open Championship was the 37th Open Championship, held 19–20 May at Royal Liverpool Golf Club in Hoylake, England. Harold Hilton, an amateur, won the Championship for the second time, a stroke ahead of James Braid.

This was the second Open to be played in England after the 1894 event staged at Royal St George's. It was also the last Open Championship with no qualifying and no cut. 88 players entered including 20 amateurs. Royal Liverpool was the home club of many of the leading amateurs of the day including John Ball Jr. and Hilton, both of whom had already won the Championship.

After the first round Ball and Sandy Herd led with scores of 78, with David Brown and Freddie Tait on 79. There were two outstanding rounds in the afternoon. Braid scored 74 gave him the lead on 154 while Hilton's 75 put him second on 155. Tait was third on 158. J.H. Taylor and Harry Vardon were a disappointing 8 and 10 strokes behind the leader.

Despite a few withdrawals, 39 pairs started on the final day. Under the new proposed cut rule, to be introduced in 1898, the field would have been reduced to a more comfortable 41. The leaders had poor third rounds which meant for a close position after the morning's play. Braid led by two from Herd, George Pulford and Tait with Hilton a further stroke behind and Brown and Tom Vardon five behind the leader. Tait was the early leader after a 79 gave him a score of 317 but this was bettered by a round of 75 by Hilton to give him the lead on 314. Hilton had scored just 18 on the opening five holes. Disappointing front nines from Herd and Pulford put them out of contention, leaving only Braid with a chance to match Hilton. After a three at the 15th, Baird reached the 16th tee needing 14 to tie with Hilton. However, with his third shot at the long 16th, he chipped over the green and he took six. He had a long putt at the last to tie but missed and finished a shot behind Hilton. With more withdrawals on the final day only 52 players completed the 72 holes, two players finishing 53 strokes behind the winner.

== First day leaderboard ==
Wednesday, 19 May 1897

Place	Player	Score
1	(Scotland) James Braid	80-74=154
2	(England) Harold Hilton (a)	80-75=155
3	(Scotland) Freddie Tait (a)	79-79=158
T4	(England) John Ball (a)	78-81=159
T4	(Scotland) Sandy Herd	78-81=159
T4	(England) George Pulford	80-79=159
7	(Scotland) David Brown	79-82=161
T8	(Scotland) Ben Sayers	84-78=162
T8	(England) J.H. Taylor	82-80=162
T8	(Jersey) Tom Vardon	81-81=162

== Final leaderboard ==
Thursday, 20 May 1897

Place	Player	Score	Money
1	(England) Harold Hilton (a)	80-75-84-75=314	(£30)
2	(Scotland) James Braid	80-74-82-79=315	£20
T3	(England) George Pulford	80-79-79-79=317	£10
T3	(Scotland) Freddie Tait (a)	79-79-80-79=317	−
5	(Scotland) Sandy Herd	78-81-79-80=318	£7
6	(Jersey) Harry Vardon	84-80-80-76=320	£5
T7	(Scotland) David Brown	79-82-80-83=324	£3 6s 8d
T7	(Scotland) Archie Simpson	83-81-81-79=324	£3 6s 8d
T7	(Jersey) Tom Vardon	81-81-79-83=324	£3 6s 8d
T10	(Scotland) Andrew Kirkaldy	83-83-82-82=330	£2 10s
T10	(England) J.H. Taylor	82-80-82-86=330	£2 10s

As an amateur Hinton received "£30 in plate" in addition to the "Championship Cup" and "Gold Medal". The prize-money for the professionals was reduced accordingly to £60. This arrangement had been introduced after the 1892 Open Championship which was also won by Hilton.
