= Asahi-Ryokuken Yomiuri Memorial =

Tournament information
- Location: Keisen, Fukuoka, Japan
- Established: 2004
- Course: Asoiizuka Golf Club
- Par: 72
- Length: 7,106 yards (6,498 m)
- Tour: Japan Golf Tour
- Format: Stroke play
- Prize fund: ¥100,000,000
- Final year: 2006

Tournament record score
- Aggregate: 270 Azuma Yano (2005); 270 Tatsuhiko Ichihara (2006)
- To par: −18 as above

Final champion
- (Japan) Tatsuhiko Ichihara
- Location in Japan Location in the Fukuoka Prefecture

The Asahi-Ryokuken Yomiuri Memorial was a professional golf tournament that was held at the Asoiizuka Golf Club near Keisen in Fukuoka Prefecture, Japan from 2004 to 2006. It was on the Japan Golf Tour. The purse for the final event in 2006 was ¥100,000,000, with ¥20,000,000 going to the winner.

== Winners ==
Year	Winner	Score	To par	Margin of victory	Runner(s)-up
2006	(Japan) Tatsuhiko Ichihara	270	−18	1 stroke	(India) Jeev Milkha Singh
2005	(Japan) Azuma Yano	270	−18	1 stroke	(Fiji) Dinesh Chand (Japan) Nozomi Kawahara (Japan) Taichi Teshima
2004	(South Korea) Yang Yong-eun	271	−17	2 strokes	(Japan) Shingo Katayama
