= Tatsuhiko Ichihara =

Japanese professional golfer

Personal information
- Nationality: Japan
- Born: 17 November 1978 (age 47) Kanagawa Prefecture, Japan
- Height: 1.87 m (6 ft 2 in)
- Weight: 90 kg (200 lb; 14 st)

Career
- Sport: Golf
- Turned professional: 1997
- Former tour: Japan Golf Tour
- Professional wins: 3

Number of wins by tour
- Japan Golf Tour: 1
- Other: 2

Best results in major championships
- Masters Tournament: DNP
- PGA Championship: DNP
- U.S. Open: DNP
- The Open Championship: CUT: 2006

Achievements and awards
- Japan Challenge Tour money list winner: 2002

Tatsuhiko Ichihara (市原 建彦, Ichihara Tatsuhiko; born 17 November 1978) is a Japanese professional golfer.

== Career ==
Ichihara played on the Japan Golf Tour, winning once.

== Professional wins (3) ==
=== Japan Golf Tour wins (1) ===
No.	Date	Tournament	Winning score	Margin of victory	Runner-up
1	5 Nov 2006	Asahi-Ryokuken Yomiuri Memorial	−18 (69-66-68-67=270)	1 stroke	(India) Jeev Milkha Singh

=== Japan Challenge Tour wins (2) ===
No.	Date	Tournament	Winning score	Margin of victory	Runner(s)-up
1	18 Apr 2002	Kourakuen Cup (1st)	−4 (72-66=138)	1 stroke	(Japan) Tsutomu Ide, (South Korea) Jang Ik-jae, (Japan) Koumei Oda
2	13 Sep 2002	Aiful Challenge Cup Autumn	−6 (71-67=138)	Playoff	(Japan) Hajime Tanaka

== Results in major championships ==
Tournament	2006
The Open Championship	CUT

CUT = missed the halfway cut
Note: Ichihara only played in The Open Championship.

== Team appearances ==
Amateur

- Eisenhower Trophy (representing Japan): 1996
