= Royal Liverpool Golf Club =

Golf club in Wirral, England

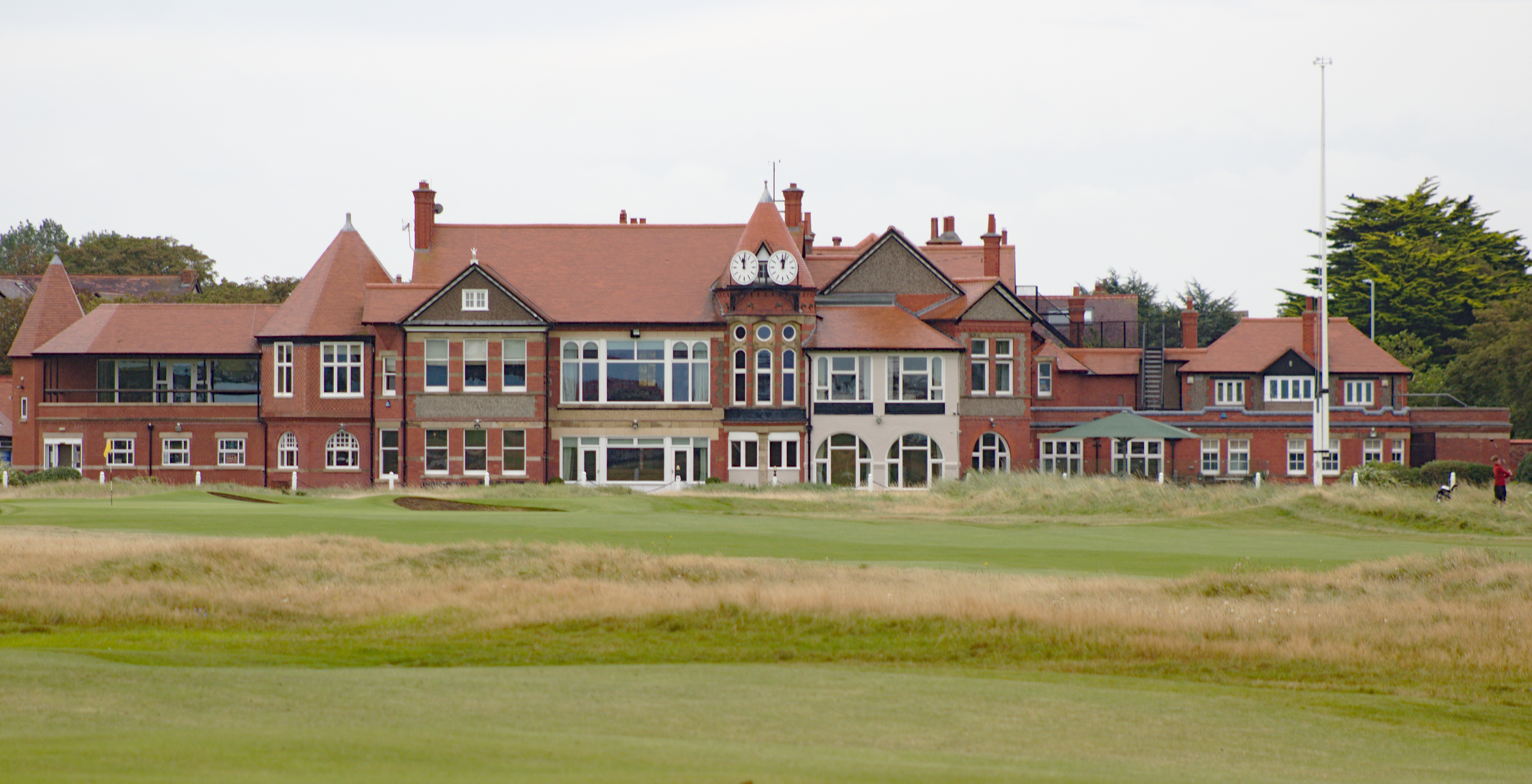
- The clubhouse at the Royal Liverpool Golf Club, also known as Hoylake

- Royal Liverpool Golf Club in Hoylake, Merseyside
- 53.385°N 3.190°W

Club information
- Location: Hoylake, Wirral, England
- Established: 1869, 157 years ago
- Type: private
- Tota holes: 18
- Tournaments: Open Championship; Amateur Championship; Women's British Open
- Website: royal-liverpool-golf.com
- Designed by: Robert Chambers, George Morris, Harry Colt
- Par: 72
- Length: 7,341 yards (6,713 m)

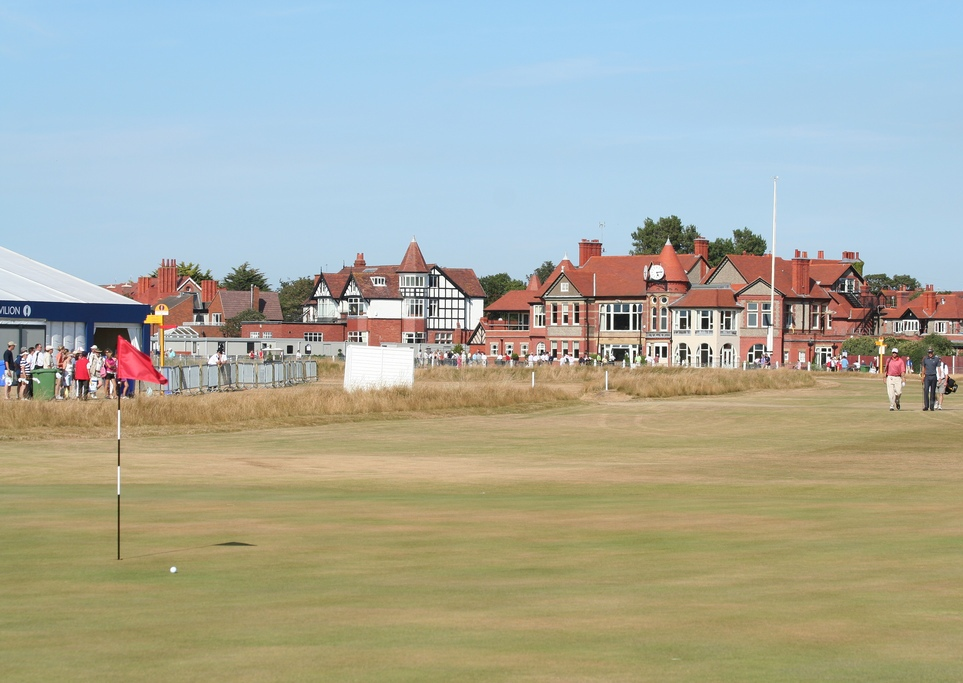
The 3rd hole at The Open Championship in 2006, the opening hole (Course) for club members

The Royal Liverpool Golf Club is a golf club in Wirral in Merseyside, England. It was founded in 1869 on what was then the racecourse of the Liverpool Hunt Club. It received the "Royal" designation in 1871 due to the patronage of Prince Arthur the Duke of Connaught, one of Queen Victoria's younger sons. Robert Chambers and George Morris (younger brother of Old Tom Morris) were commissioned to lay out the original course, which was extended to 18 holes in 1871. Harry Colt, one of the world's leading golf course architects, redesigned the course early in the 20th century, and it has since been tweaked periodically, mainly as a response to advances in equipment.

The Open Championship has been played 13 times at Royal Liverpool Golf Club, most recently in 2023.

== Location ==
Royal Liverpool Golf Club is located in the small town of Hoylake, at the northwest corner of the Wirral Peninsula. The golf course extends between Hoylake and the neighbouring town of West Kirby, to the southwest. It has a single 18-hole course, which is a seaside links.

== History ==
Royal Liverpool was the inaugural men's amateur championship host in 1885, which became The Amateur Championship. It was host to the first ever international match between Scotland and England in 1902. It hosted the first Home International matches between Great Britain & Ireland and the United States in 1921, an event which became the Walker Cup. In fact, it is Royal Liverpool Golf Club's contribution to the amateur game that has set it apart from all other clubs in England. Although, at the end of the nineteenth century, it was the Royal and Ancient Golf Club of St Andrews that took on the role of the governing body in golf as the game developed, it was at Royal Liverpool that the rules of amateur status were laid down. The Open at Royal Liverpool was also the scene of the second leg of Bobby Jones' historic Grand Slam in 1930.

== Superstar champions Ball and Hilton ==
The history of Royal Liverpool would not be complete without mention of two of the club's most famous sons, Harold Hilton and John Ball. Between them they dominated the amateur game of their era, and the pair were also a major influence on the professional game, each of them winning the Open Championship as amateurs. Ball won the Amateur Championship eight times between 1888 and 1912, and was runner-up twice. The venerable Ball competed in the Amateur Championship as late as 1921 when Royal Liverpool hosted the event. He won the Open Championship in 1890, the first Englishman and the first amateur to do so, and also took the Amateur title the same year.

Harold Hilton's record was just as impressive. He won the Open twice, in 1892 (the first year the Open was played over 72 holes) and again five years later, making him the only amateur apart from John Ball and Bobby Jones to win the title. His victory at Hoylake in 1897 was marked 100 years later by the creation of a new, annual Harold Hilton Medal tournament open to amateur golfers aged 30 or more and handicap five or less. Hilton also won the Amateur Championship four times, was runner-up on three occasions, and won the U.S. Amateur in 1911, the year in which he also held the British title. This feat made him the first to hold both major amateur titles simultaneously. In the same year he still found time to become the first editor of the new Golf Monthly magazine.

== Character of the course ==
Many comments have been made over the years about the quality and toughness of the links. The wind's absence was conspicuous during the benign Open week in 2006. However, such was winner Tiger Woods' respect for the need for strategic play that he only hit his driver once during the tournament, with the course baked out due to dry conditions, and playing very fast. The course is mostly level, but the holes nearest the coast run through sandhills. The course underwent a variety of changes in advance of the 2023 Open Championship, including a new par-3 that will play as the 17th hole during The Open.

== Important events ==
Important tournaments staged at Royal Liverpool include:

- The Open Championship: 1897, 1902, 1907, 1913, 1924, 1930, 1936, 1947, 1956, 1967, 2006, 2014, 2023.
- The Amateur Championship: 1885 (the inaugural event), 1887, 1890, 1894, 1898, 1902, 1906, 1910, 1921, 1927, 1933, 1939, 1953, 1962, 1969, 1975, 1995, 2000, 2026
- Ladies' British Amateur Championship: 1896, 1989, 1996
- Women's British Open: 2012
- Walker Cup: 1983, 2019
- Curtis Cup: 1992

The course has also hosted a number of professional tournaments on the European Tour and before its foundation in 1972. Royal Liverpool has been the site for many tournaments for ladies, seniors, and boys, and various regional and representative events. It hosted The Open Championship for the first time in 39 years in 2006; Tiger Woods won his third Open Championship, two strokes ahead of runner-up Chris DiMarco. It was an emotional victory for Woods, who had lost his father to prostate cancer just two months earlier.

Royal Liverpool hosted the 2010 English Men's Open Amateur Stroke Play Championship for the Brabazon Trophy; the event was won by Darren Wright. The links had earlier staged the Brabazon on four occasions. In 1961, Ronnie Shade was champion, followed in 1972 by Peter Moody, a former University of Cambridge captain. Sandy Lyle lifted the trophy in 1977, while the 1989 event saw a tie between Craig Rivett from South Africa and Neil Roderick from Wales.

Royal Liverpool hosted the Women's British Open for the first time in 2012. The championship was won by South Korea's Jiyai Shin, who set a new record for the largest winning margin in the event (9 strokes) and a new women's course record of 64 in her second round.

== The Open Championship ==
The thirteen winners of The Open Championship at Royal Liverpool Golf Club:

Year	Winner	Score					Winner's share (£)
Year	Winner	R1	R2	R3	R4	Total	Winner's share (£)
1897	(England) Harold Hilton (a) ^{2nd}	80	75	84	75	314	Am (30)
1902	(Scotland) Sandy Herd	77	76	73	81	307	30
1907	(France) Arnaud Massy	76	81	78	77	312	30
1913	(England) J.H. Taylor ^{5th}	73	75	77	79	304	50
1924	(United States) Walter Hagen ^{2nd}	77	73	74	77	301	75
1930	(United States) Bobby Jones (a) ^{3rd}	70	72	74	75	291	Am (100)
1936	(England) Alf Padgham	73	72	71	71	287 (−9)	100
1947	(Northern Ireland) Fred Daly	73	70	78	72	293 (+21)	150
1956	(Australia) Peter Thomson ^{3rd}	70	70	72	74	286 (+2)	1,000
1967	(Argentina) Roberto De Vicenzo	70	71	67	70	278 (−10)	2,100
2006	(United States) Tiger Woods ^{3rd}	67	65	71	67	270 (−18)	720,000
2014	(Northern Ireland) Rory McIlroy	66	66	68	71	271 (−17)	975,000
2023	(United States) Brian Harman	67	65	69	70	271 (−13)	2,332,800

- Note: For multiple winners of The Open Championship, superscript ordinal identifies which in their respective careers.
- (a) denotes amateur

== Course yardage ==
- Normal Route

Royal Liverpool Golf Club
Tee	Rating/Slope	1	2	3	4	5	6	7	8	9	Out	10	11	12	13	14	15	16	17	18	In	Total
Championship	77.1 / 152	425	366	514	199	479	437	215	503	388	3,526	444	191	454	614	456	134	611	458	453	3,815	7,341
Green	74.6 / 146	425	366	510	176	421	384	190	503	388	3,363	392	191	410	516	432	134	552	398	402	3,427	6,790
Yellow	M:72.2 / 139 W:78.7 / 153	413	356	485	151	387	357	178	478	353	3,158	358	165	383	493	417	107	506	370	374	3,173	6,331
Par	Men's	4	4	5	3	4	4	3	5	4	36	4	3	4	5	4	3	5	4	4	36	72
SI	Men's	5	13	11	7	1	9	15	17	3		8	14	4	18	2	16	12	6	10
Black	M:69.4 / 127 W:75.1 / 146	395	328	459	127	349	332	153	445	310	2,899	310	150	354	462	410	100	468	347	347	2,948	5,847
Par	Women's	5	4	5	3	4	4	3	5	4	37	4	3	4	5	5	3	5	4	4	37	74
SI	Women's	13	7	3	17	1	9	15	5	11		8	16	2	6	14	18	10	4	12

- At the 2023 Open Championship, play started at the 17th hole (Royal) and concluded at the par-5 16th hole (Dun).

Hole	Name	Par	Hole	Name	Par
1	Course	4	10	Dee	4
2	Road	4	11	Alps	3
3	Long	5	12	Hilbre	4
4	New	3	13	Field	5
5	Telegraph	4	14	Lake	4
6	Briars	4	15	Little Eye	3
7	Dowie	3	16	Dun	5
8	Far	5	17	Royal	4
9	Punch Bowl	4	18	Stand	4
Out		36	In		36
			Total		72

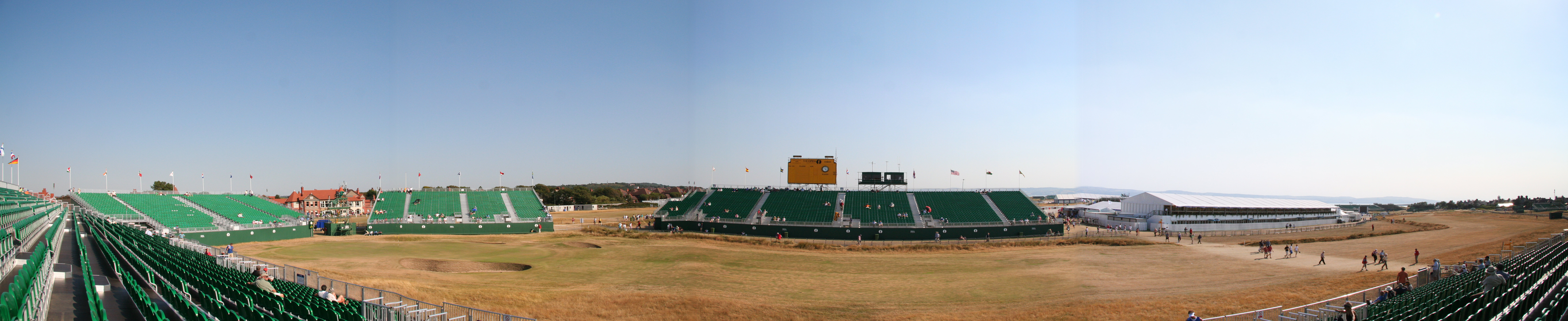
The 18th Hole at Royal Liverpool Golf Club
- Open Route

Tee	Rating/Slope	1	2	3	4	5	6	7	8	9	Out	10	11	12	13	14	15	16	17	18	In	Total
2023 Open		459	453	426	367	520	201	481	436	218	3,561	507	392	449	194	454	620	461	136	609	3,822	7,383
Par	2023 Open	4	4	4	4	5	3	4	4	3	35	4	4	4	3	4	5	4	3	5	36	71
Championship	M:77.0 / 152	458	453	425	366	514	199	479	437	215	3,546	503	388	444	191	454	614	456	134	611	3,795	7,341
Green	M:74.5 / 146	398	402	425	366	510	176	421	384	190	3,272	503	388	392	191	410	516	432	134	552	3,518	6,790
Par		4	4	4	4	5	3	4	4	3	35	5	4	4	3	4	5	4	3	5	37	72
Yellow	M:72.2 / 138 W:78.7 / 154	370	374	413	356	485	151	387	357	178	3,071	478	353	358	165	383	493	417	107	506	3,260	6,331
Black	M:69.4 / 126 W:75.1 / 145	347	347	396	328	459	127	349	332	153	2,838	445	310	310	150	354	462	410	100	468	3,009	5,847
Par	Men's	4	4	4	4	5	3	4	4	3	35	5	4	4	3	4	5	4	3	5	37	72
Par	Women's	4	4	5	4	5	3	4	4	3	36	5	4	4	3	4	5	5	3	5	38	74

== See also ==
- List of golf clubs granted Royal status
