= 2002 Japan Golf Tour =

Golf tour season

2002 Japan Golf Tour season
- Duration: 14 March 2002 – 8 December 2002
- Number of official events: 29
- Most wins: (Japan) Toru Taniguchi (4)
- Money list: (Japan) Toru Taniguchi
- Most Valuable Player: (Japan) Toru Taniguchi
- Rookie of the Year: (Australia) Brendan Jones

The 2002 Japan Golf Tour, titled as the 2002 iiyama Tour for sponsorship reasons, was the 30th season of the Japan Golf Tour (formerly the PGA of Japan Tour), the main professional golf tour in Japan since it was formed in 1973.

It was the third season of the tour under a title sponsorship agreement with Iiyama, that began in 2000.

== Schedule ==
The following table lists official events during the 2002 season.

Date	Tournament	Location	Purse (¥)	Winner (Note: The number in brackets after each winner's name is the number of Japan Golf Tour events they had won up to and including that tournament. This information is only shown for Japan Golf Tour members.)	OWGR points	Notes
17 Mar	Token Corporation Cup	Kagoshima	100,000,000	(Japan) Toru Taniguchi (4)	16	
24 Mar	Dydo Drinco Shizuoka Open	Shizuoka	100,000,000	(Japan) Kiyoshi Murota (5)	16	
28 Apr	Tsuruya Open	Hyōgo	100,000,000	(United States) Dean Wilson (5)	16	
5 May	The Crowns	Aichi	120,000,000	(England) Justin Rose (n/a)	16	
12 May	Fujisankei Classic	Shizuoka	140,000,000	(Japan) Nobuhito Sato (7)	16	
19 May	Japan PGA Championship	Nara	110,000,000	(Japan) Kenichi Kuboya (3)	16	Japan major
26 May	Munsingwear Open KSB Cup	Kagawa	120,000,000	(Japan) Kenichi Kuboya (4)	16	
2 Jun	Diamond Cup Tournament	Saitama	100,000,000	(Japan) Tsuneyuki Nakajima (46)	16	
9 Jun	JCB Classic Sendai	Miyagi	100,000,000	(Japan) Toru Suzuki (6)	16	
23 Jun	Tamanoi Yomiuri Open	Hyōgo	90,000,000	(Japan) Toru Taniguchi (5)	16	
30 Jun	Gateway to The Open Mizuno Open	Okayama	100,000,000	(United States) Dean Wilson (6)	16	
7 Jul	Japan Golf Tour Championship iiyama Cup	Tochigi	120,000,000	(Japan) Nobuhito Sato (8)	16	Japan major
14 Jul	Juken Sangyo Open Hiroshima	Hiroshima	90,000,000	(South Korea) Hur Suk-ho (1)	16	
28 Jul	Sato Foods NST Niigata Open Golf Championship	Niigata	50,000,000	(Japan) Yasuharu Imano (3)	16	
4 Aug	Aiful Cup	Ishikawa	120,000,000	(Japan) Yasuharu Imano (4)	16	
11 Aug	Sun Chlorella Classic	Hokkaidō	120,000,000	(United States) Christian Peña (1)	16	
1 Sep	Hisamitsu-KBC Augusta	Fukuoka	100,000,000	(Japan) Nobumitsu Yuhara (7)	16	
8 Sep	Japan PGA Match-Play Championship Promise Cup	Hokkaidō	80,000,000	(Japan) Nobuhito Sato (9)	16	
15 Sep	Suntory Open	Chiba	100,000,000	(Japan) Shingo Katayama (11)	16	
22 Sep	ANA Open	Hokkaidō	100,000,000	(Japan) Masashi Ozaki (94)	16	
29 Sep	Acom International	Ibaraki	120,000,000	(Japan) Toru Taniguchi (6)	16	
13 Oct	Georgia Tokai Classic	Aichi	120,000,000	(Japan) Toru Taniguchi (7)	16	
20 Oct	Japan Open Golf Championship	Yamaguchi	120,000,000	(New Zealand) David Smail (1)	32	Flagship event (Note: Also a Japan major championship.)
27 Oct	Bridgestone Open	Chiba	110,000,000	(Australia) Scott Laycock (1)	16	
3 Nov	Philip Morris K.K. Championship	Hyōgo	200,000,000	(Australia) Brendan Jones (1)	16	
17 Nov	Mitsui Sumitomo Visa Taiheiyo Masters	Shizuoka	150,000,000	(Japan) Tsuneyuki Nakajima (47)	16	
24 Nov	Dunlop Phoenix Tournament	Miyazaki	200,000,000	(Japan) Kaname Yokoo (4)	44	
1 Dec	Casio World Open	Kagoshima	140,000,000	(New Zealand) David Smail (2)	16	
8 Dec	Golf Nippon Series JT Cup	Tokyo	100,000,000	(Japan) Shingo Katayama (12)	16	Japan major

=== Unofficial events ===
The following events were sanctioned by the Japan Golf Tour, but did not carry official money, nor were wins official.

Date	Tournament	Location	Purse	Winner	OWGR points	Notes
14 Apr	Masters Tournament	United States	US$5,600,000	(United States) Tiger Woods	100	Major championship
16 Jun	U.S. Open	United States	US$6,250,000	(United States) Tiger Woods	100	Major championship
21 Jul	The Open Championship	Scotland	£3,800,000	(South Africa) Ernie Els	100	Major championship
18 Aug	PGA Championship	United States	US$5,500,000	(United States) Rich Beem	100	Major championship

== Money list ==
The money list was based on prize money won during the season, calculated in Japanese yen.

Position	Player	Prize money (¥)
1	(Japan) Toru Taniguchi	145,440,341
2	(Japan) Nobuhito Sato	130,825,969
3	(Japan) Shingo Katayama	129,258,019
4	(United States) Dean Wilson	97,116,100
5	(New Zealand) David Smail	94,103,576

== Awards ==
Award	Winner	Ref.
Most Valuable Player	(Japan) Toru Taniguchi	
Rookie of the Year (Shimada Trophy)	(Australia) Brendan Jones	

== Japan Challenge Tour ==
2002 Japan Challenge Tour season
- Duration: 4 April 2002 – 7 November 2002
- Number of official events: 11
- Most wins: (Japan) Tatsuhiko Ichihara (2)
- Money list: (Japan) Tatsuhiko Ichihara

The 2002 Japan Challenge Tour was the 18th season of the Japan Challenge Tour, the official development tour to the Japan Golf Tour.

=== Schedule ===
The following table lists official events during the 2002 season.

Date	Tournament	Location	Purse (¥)	Winner (Note: The number in brackets after each winner's name is the number of Japan Challenge Tour events they had won up to and including that tournament. It is rare for someone to accumulate many wins on the Japan Challenge Tour as success at this level usually leads to promotion to the Japan Golf Tour.)
5 Apr	PRGR Cup (Kanto)	Ibaraki	10,000,000	(Japan) Masayoshi Yamazoe (1)
18 Apr	Kourakuen Cup (1st)	Oita	10,000,000	(Japan) Tatsuhiko Ichihara (1)
10 May	JGTO iiyama Challenge I	Tochigi	10,000,000	(Japan) Shinji Ikeuchi (1)
31 May	JGTO iiyama Challenge II	Mie	10,000,000	(Japan) Nobuhiro Masuda (1)
14 Jun	Aiful Challenge Cup Spring	Hyōgo	10,000,000	(Japan) Satoru Hirota (1)
28 Jun	PGA Cup Challenge	Hiroshima	10,000,000	(Japan) Yuzo Oyama (2)
11 Jul	Kourakuen Cup (2nd)	Chiba	10,000,000	(Australia) Paul Sheehan (1)
13 Sep	Aiful Challenge Cup Autumn	Aomori	10,000,000	(Japan) Tatsuhiko Ichihara (2)
27 Sep	Kasco Cup	Chiba	10,000,000	(Japan) Hideki Haraguchi (1)
4 Oct	PRGR Cup (Kansai)	Hyōgo	10,000,000	(Japan) Hideto Tanihara (1)
7 Nov	Kourakuen Cup (3rd)	Tochigi	10,000,000	(Japan) Mitsuhiro Tateyama (2)

=== Money list ===
The money list was based on prize money won during the season, calculated in Japanese yen. The top 20 players on the money list earned status to play on the 2003 Japan Golf Tour.

Position	Player	Prize money (¥)
1	(Japan) Tatsuhiko Ichihara	4,124,935
2	(Japan) Nobuhiro Masuda	3,860,479
3	(Australia) Paul Sheehan	3,182,692
4	(Japan) Mitsuhiro Tateyama	2,700,000
5	(Japan) Satoshi Oide	2,695,742
