= List of career achievements by Jack Nicklaus =

This page details statistics, records, and other achievements pertaining to championship golfer Jack Nicklaus.

== Major championships ==
=== Wins (18) ===
Year	Championship	54 holes	Winning score	Margin	Runner(s)-up
1962	U.S. Open	2 shot deficit	−1 (72-70-72-69=283)	Playoff^{1}	(United States) Arnold Palmer
1963	Masters Tournament	1 shot lead	−2 (74-66-74-72=286)	1 stroke	(United States) Tony Lema
1963	PGA Championship	3 shot deficit	−5 (69-73-69-68=279)	2 strokes	(United States) Dave Ragan
1965	Masters Tournament (2)	5 shot lead	−17 (67-71-64-69=271)	9 strokes	(United States) Arnold Palmer, (South Africa) Gary Player
1966	Masters Tournament (3)	Tied for lead	E (68-76-72-72=288)	Playoff^{2}	(United States) Tommy Jacobs (2nd), (United States) Gay Brewer (3rd)
1966	The Open Championship	2 shot deficit	−2 (70-67-75-70=282)	1 stroke	(United States) Doug Sanders, (Wales) Dave Thomas
1967	U.S. Open (2)	1 shot deficit	−5 (71-67-72-65=275)	4 strokes	(United States) Arnold Palmer
1970	The Open Championship (2)	2 shot deficit	−5 (68-69-73-73=283)	Playoff^{3}	(United States) Doug Sanders
1971	PGA Championship (2)	4 shot lead	−7 (69-69-70-73=281)	2 strokes	(United States) Billy Casper
1972	Masters Tournament (4)	1 shot lead	−2 (68-71-73-74=286)	3 strokes	(Australia) Bruce Crampton, (United States) Bobby Mitchell, (United States) Tom Weiskopf
1972	U.S. Open (3)	1 shot lead	+2 (71-73-72-74=290)	3 strokes	(Australia) Bruce Crampton
1973	PGA Championship (3)	1 shot lead	−7 (72-68-68-69=277)	4 strokes	(Australia) Bruce Crampton
1975	Masters Tournament (5)	1 shot deficit	−12 (68-67-73-68=276)	1 stroke	(United States) Tom Weiskopf, (United States) Johnny Miller
1975	PGA Championship (4)	4 shot lead	−4 (70-68-67-71=276)	2 strokes	(Australia) Bruce Crampton
1978	The Open Championship (3)	1 shot deficit	−7 (71-72-69-69=281)	2 strokes	(United States) Ben Crenshaw, (United States) Raymond Floyd, (United States) Tom Kite, (New Zealand) Simon Owen
1980	U.S. Open (4)	Tied for lead	−8 (63-71-70-68=272)	2 strokes	(Japan) Isao Aoki
1980	PGA Championship (5)	3 shot lead	−6 (70-69-66-69=274)	7 strokes	(United States) Andy Bean
1986	Masters Tournament (6)	4 shot deficit	−9 (74-71-69-65=279)	1 stroke	(United States) Tom Kite, (Australia) Greg Norman

^{1}Defeated Palmer in 18-hole playoff; Nicklaus (71), Palmer (74).
^{2}Defeated Jacobs (2nd) & Brewer (3rd) in 18-hole playoff; Nicklaus (70), Jacobs (72), Brewer (78). 1st, 2nd and 3rd prizes awarded in this playoff.
^{3}Defeated Sanders in 18-hole playoff; Nicklaus (72), Sanders (73).

=== Records and trivia ===
- In a span of 25 years, from 1962 (age 22) to 1986 (age 46), Nicklaus won 18 professional major championships. This is the most any player has won in his career.
- Nicklaus held sole possession of the lead after 54 holes of a major championship on eight occasions and won each in regulation.
- Nicklaus won 10 of 12 major championships when having the lead outright or tied for the lead after 54 holes and won eight times when trailing after 54 holes.
- In the above-referenced 20 major championships where Nicklaus either won (18) or finished in second place (2), he was a combined 30 strokes under par in final round scoring.
- In 18 professional major championship victories, Nicklaus shot 56 rounds at even par or below.
- Nicklaus won two major championships in a season on five occasions (1963, 1966, 1972, 1975, and 1980).
- Nicklaus won at least one major championship in four consecutive years (1970–1973).
- Nicklaus is one of six players (along with Gene Sarazen, Ben Hogan, Gary Player, Tiger Woods and Rory McIlroy) to have won all four professional major championships in his career, known as the Career Grand Slam, and the second-youngest to do so in his fifth year as a professional at age 26 (Tiger Woods, fourth year at age 24).
- At age 33 in 1973, Nicklaus broke Bobby Jones' record of 13 major championships (old configuration) and Walter Hagen's record of 11 professional major championships by winning his third PGA Championship; 14th and 12th win, respectively.
- One of two players to achieve a "triple career slam" i.e. winning all four major championships three times in a career, the other being Tiger Woods.
- Nicklaus made 39 consecutive cuts in major championships starting at the 1969 Masters and ending by being cut at the 1978 PGA Championship. In this span he won eight times, was runner-up seven times, and had 33 top-10 finishes. This record of consecutive cuts made in major championships was equaled by Tiger Woods at the 2006 Masters.
- Nicklaus holds the record for most runner-up finishes in majors with 19.
- Nicklaus holds the record for most top-five finishes in major championships with 56.
- One of two players to finish in the top five in all four professional major championships in two different years (1971 and 1973), the other being Tiger Woods (2000 and 2005). Both players finished in the top four in all four majors once (1973 and 2005, respectively). Bobby Jones won the "Grand Slam" under the old configuration in 1930 and Ben Hogan won all three of the majors he was able to play in 1953.
- Nicklaus holds the record for most top-10 finishes in major championships with 73. This is 25 and 27 more than the next players Sam Snead (48) and Tom Watson (46), respectively.
- Nicklaus finished in the top-10 in his final three professional major championships as an amateur (second in the 1960 U.S. Open, seventh in the 1961 Masters, and fourth in the 1961 U.S. Open).
- Nicklaus played 154 consecutive majors for which he was eligible, from the 1957 U.S. Open through the 1998 U.S. Open.

==== Masters Tournament ====
- Nicklaus holds the record for most wins with six which is two more than Arnold Palmer and one more than Tiger Woods.
- Nicklaus shot 17-under par 271 in 1965 for a 72-hole record lasting 32 years until Tiger Woods shot 18-under par 270 in 1997.
- Nicklaus shot individual rounds of 67 or better a total of 14 times which equates to a combined 80-under par.
- Nicklaus was the first champion to successfully defend the title having done so in 1966.
- Nicklaus won this event three times in his first five attempts as a professional.
- Nicklaus is the youngest two-time champion of this event.
- Nicklaus is the youngest three-time champion of this event.
- Nicklaus is the oldest winner of the Masters at 46 years and 82 days when he won in 1986.
- Nicklaus was a wire-to-wire winner in 1972.
- Nicklaus was runner-up a record four times.
- Nicklaus holds the record for most top-five finishes with 15.
- Nicklaus holds the record for most top-10 finishes with 22.
- In the decade of the 1970s, Nicklaus finished in the top 10 at Augusta every year with eight top-four finishes.
- Nicklaus holds the record for the lowest 72-hole score for a player over 50 having shot a 5-under par 283 in 1998 at age 58.
- Nicklaus was the oldest first-round leader (co-led with four others) shooting 67 in 1993 at age 53.
- Nicklaus holds the record for lowest scoring average of players with over 100 rounds at 71.98 for 163 rounds.
- Nicklaus competed in this event 45 times.
- Nicklaus holds the record for most cuts made with 37.
- Nicklaus holds the record for most birdies with 506.
- Nicklaus holds the record for most eagles with 24.
- For 34 consecutive years (1960 through 1993), Nicklaus missed just one 36-hole cut (1967).

==== U.S. Open ====
- Nicklaus holds the record with Willie Anderson, Bobby Jones and Ben Hogan for most wins at the U.S Open with four.
- Nicklaus is the only player to win the title in three different decades with his first in 1962 and fourth in 1980.
- Nicklaus is the youngest champion of this event in the modern era having won in 1962 at age 22. This has since been beaten by Rory McIlroy in 2011.
- Nicklaus held until 2011 the record for lowest score for 72 holes (272) with Lee Janzen (67-67-69-69) in 1993, Tiger Woods (65-69-71-67) in 2000, and Jim Furyk (67-66-67-72) in 2003. Nicklaus shot 63-71-70-68 in 1980.
- Nicklaus shares the record for lowest score for 18 holes (63). It was set by Johnny Miller (fourth round in 1973) and equalled by Nicklaus and Tom Weiskopf (both first round in 1980) and Vijay Singh (second round in 2003).
- Nicklaus was a wire-to-wire winner in 1972 and 1980.
- Nicklaus holds the record for lowest 72-hole score shot by an amateur at two-under par 282 in 1960. While he finished second to Arnold Palmer by two shots, Nicklaus was the only player in the field not to have one round above the par of 71.
- Nicklaus tied for fourth in 1961 having played the final 54 holes in one-under par and capturing Low Amateur honors for the second consecutive year.
- Nicklaus had four runner-up finishes.
- Nicklaus had a record 11 top-five finishes.
- Nicklaus had a record 18 top-10 finishes.
- Nicklaus holds the record for most rounds in the 60s at 29.
- Nicklaus holds the record for most sub-par rounds at 37.
- Nicklaus holds the record for most sub-par championships (72 holes) completed at seven.
- Nicklaus holds the record for the most consecutive tournaments started with 44 (1957–2000).
- Nicklaus holds the record for most cuts made at 35.
- Nicklaus made 21 consecutive cuts from 1964 through 1984.
- Nicklaus made a record five consecutive birdies in the final round of the 1982 U.S. Open.

==== The Open Championship ====
- Nicklaus won this event three times.
- Nicklaus was runner-up a record seven times.
- Nicklaus had a record 11 straight top-five finishes from 1970 to 1980.
- Nicklaus had a record 16 top-five finishes.
- Nicklaus had a record 15 straight top-10 finishes from 1966 to 1980.
- Nicklaus had a record 18 top-10 finishes.
- Nicklaus holds the record for most rounds in the 60s at 33.
- Nicklaus never finished worse than sixth from 1966 to 1980.
- Nicklaus was the first player to break 270 for four rounds having done so in 1977.
- Nicklaus made the cut in 32 out of 38 appearances including 23 consecutively from 1962 through 1984.

==== PGA Championship ====
- Nicklaus holds the record with Walter Hagen for most wins at the PGA Championship with 5.
- Nicklaus was a wire-to-wire winner in 1971.
- Nicklaus was runner-up four times.
- Nicklaus holds the record for most top-three finishes with 12.
- Nicklaus holds the record for most top-five finishes with 14.
- Nicklaus holds the record for most top-10 finishes with 15.
- Nicklaus holds the record for most top-25 finishes with 23.
- Nicklaus holds the record for most rounds in the 60s at 41.
- Nicklaus holds the record for lowest scoring average of players with over 75 rounds at 71.37 for 128 rounds.
- Nicklaus holds the record for most cuts made at 27 (with Raymond Floyd).
- Nicklaus competed in this event 37 times which is second only to Sam Snead's record of 38.
- Nicklaus held the record for the greatest winning margin in the stroke play era from 1958 to 2011. He won by 7 strokes in 1980; Rory McIlroy won by 8 strokes in 2012.

=== Results timeline ===
Tournament	1957	1958	1959
Masters Tournament			CUT
U.S. Open	CUT	T41	CUT
The Open Championship			
PGA Championship			

Tournament	1960	1961	1962	1963	1964	1965	1966	1967	1968	1969
Masters Tournament	T13LA	T7	T15	1	T2	1	1	CUT	T5	T24
U.S. Open	2LA	T4LA	1	CUT	T23	T31	3	1	2	T25
The Open Championship			T32	3	2	T12	1	2	T2	T6
PGA Championship			T3	1	T2	T2	T22	T3	CUT	T11

Tournament	1970	1971	1972	1973	1974	1975	1976	1977	1978	1979
Masters Tournament	8	T2	1	T3	T4	1	T3	2	7	4
U.S. Open	T49	2	1	T4	T10	T7	T11	T10	T6	T9
The Open Championship	1	T5	2	4	3	T3	T2	2	1	T2
PGA Championship	T6	1	T13	1	2	1	T4	3	CUT	T65

Tournament	1980	1981	1982	1983	1984	1985	1986	1987	1988	1989
Masters Tournament	T33	T2	T15	WD	T18	T6	1	T7	T21	18
U.S. Open	1	T6	2	T43	T21	CUT	T8	T46	CUT	T43
The Open Championship	T4	T23	T10	T29	T31	CUT	T46	T72	T25	T30
PGA Championship	1	T4	T16	2	T25	T32	T16	T24	CUT	T27

Tournament	1990	1991	1992	1993	1994	1995	1996	1997	1998	1999
Masters Tournament	6	T35	T42	T27	CUT	T35	T41	T39	T6	
U.S. Open	T33	T46	CUT	T72	T28	CUT	T27	T52	T43	CUT
The Open Championship	T63	T44	CUT	CUT	CUT	T79	T45	60		
PGA Championship	CUT	T23	CUT	CUT	CUT	T67	CUT	CUT		

Tournament	2000	2001	2002	2003	2004	2005
Masters Tournament	T54	CUT		CUT	CUT	CUT
U.S. Open	CUT					
The Open Championship	CUT					CUT
PGA Championship	CUT					

Win
Top 10
Did not play

LA = Low amateur
CUT = missed the half-way cut
WD = withdrew
"T" indicates a tie for a place.

=== Summary of performances ===
- Starts – 164
- Wins – 18
- Runners-up – 19
- Top 3 finishes – 46
- Top 5 finishes – 56
- Top 10 finishes – 73
- Top 25 finishes – 95
- Made Cuts – 131
- Missed Cuts – 32
- Withdrew – 1
- Longest streak of consecutive majors played – 146 (1962 Masters to 1998 U.S. Open)
- Longest streak of top-five finishes in majors – 7 (1971 Masters to 1972 Open Championship)
- Longest streak of top-10s in majors – 13 (1973 Masters to 1976 Masters)
- Longest streak of top-15 finishes in majors – 33 (1970 Open Championship to 1978 Open Championship)
- Longest streak of top-25 finishes in majors – 33 (1970 Open Championship to 1978 Open Championship)
- Longest streak without missing a cut – 39 (1969 Masters to 1978 Open Championship)

== The Players Championship ==
=== Wins (3) ===
Year	Championship	54 holes	Winning score	Margin	Runner-up
1974	Tournament Players Championship	3 shot deficit	−16 (66-71-68-67=272)	2 strokes	(United States) J. C. Snead
1976	Tournament Players Championship (2)	Tied for lead	−19 (66-70-68-65=269)	3 strokes	(United States) J. C. Snead
1978	Tournament Players Championship (3)	1 shot lead	+1 (70-71-73-75=289)	1 stroke	(United States) Lou Graham

=== Results timeline ===
Tournament	1974	1975	1976	1977	1978	1979	1980	1981	1982	1983	1984	1985	1986	1987	1988	1989	1990	1991	1992	1993	1994	1995
The Players Championship	1	T18	1	T5	1	T33	T14	T29	CUT	T19	T33	T17	CUT	CUT	CUT	T29	CUT					CUT

Win
Top 10
Did not play

CUT = missed the halfway cut
"T" indicates a tie for a place.

== Senior major championships ==
=== Wins (8) ===
Year	Championship	Winning score	Margin	Runner(s)-up
1990	The Tradition at Desert Mountain	−10 (71-67-68=206)	4 strokes	(South Africa) Gary Player
1990	Mazda Senior Tournament Players Championship	−27 (65-68-64-64=261)	6 strokes	(United States) Lee Trevino
1991	The Tradition at Desert Mountain (2)	−11 (71-73-66-67=277)	1 stroke	(United States) Jim Colbert, (United States) Jim Dent, (United States) Phil Rodgers
1991	PGA Seniors' Championship	−17 (66-66-69-70=271)	6 strokes	(Australia) Bruce Crampton
1991	U.S. Senior Open	+2 (72-69-70-71=282)	Playoff^{1}	(United States) Chi-Chi Rodríguez
1993	U.S. Senior Open (2)	−6 (68-73-67-70=278)	1 stroke	(United States) Tom Weiskopf
1995	The Tradition (3)	−12 (69-71-69-67=276)	Playoff^{2}	(Japan) Isao Aoki
1996	The Tradition (4)	−16 (68-74-65-65=272)	3 strokes	(United States) Hale Irwin

^{1}Defeated Rodríguez in 18-hole playoff; Nicklaus, (65), Rodríguez (69).
^{2}Defeated Aoki with a birdie on the third extra playoff hole.

=== Results timeline ===
Tournament	1990	1991	1992	1993	1994	1995	1996	1997	1998	1999
The Tradition	1	1	2	T9	T4	1	1	T25	T25	
Senior PGA Championship	T3	1	T10	T9	9	8	T22	T2	T6	
Senior Players Championship	1	T22		T22	T6	2	T24	T8	6	
U.S. Senior Open	T2	1	T3	1	T7	2	16	T5	T13	

Tournament	2000	2001	2002	2003	2004
The Tradition	T9	T29	69	T10	
Senior PGA Championship	T12	12	WD	CUT	WD
Senior Players Championship	T34	WD		T40	
U.S. Senior Open	T21	4		T25	
Senior British Open				T14	

Win
Top 10
Did not play

CUT = missed the half-way cut
WD = withdrew
"T" indicates a tie for a place.
Note: The Senior British Open was not a Champions Tour major until 2003.

=== Summary of performances ===
- Starts – 50
- Cuts made – 46 (cut once, withdrew 3 times)
- Wins – 8
- Second place finishes – 5
- Top-three finishes – 15
- Top-five finishes – 18
- Top-10 finishes – 30
- Longest streak of top-10s – 10

== PGA Tour career summary ==
Year	Starts	Wins (Majors)	2nd	3rd	Earnings ($)	Money list rank	Scoring average
1962	26	3 (1)	3	4	61,868	3	70.80
1963	25	5 (2)	2	3	100,040	2	70.42
1964	26	4	6	3	113,284	1	69.96
1965	24	5 (1)	4	3	140,752	1	70.09
1966	19	3 (2)	3	3	111,419	2	70.58
1967	23	5 (1)	2	3	188,998	1	70.23
1968	22	2	3	1	155,285	2	69.97
1969	23	3	1	0	140,167	3	71.06
1970	19	3 (1)	3	2	142,149	4	70.75
1971	18	5 (1)	3	3	244,490	1	70.08
1972	19	7 (2)	3	0	320,542	1	70.23
1973	18	7 (1)	1	1	308,362	1	69.81
1974	18	2	3	0	238,178	2	70.06
1975	16	5 (2)	1	3	298,149	1	69.87
1976	16	2	2	1	266,438	1	70.17
1977	18	3	2	1	284,509	2	70.36
1978	15	4 (1)	2	0	256,672	4	71.07
1979	12	0	0	1	59,434	71	72.49
1980	13	2 (2)	1	0	172,386	13	70.86
1981	16	0	3	0	178,213	16	70.70
1982	15	1	3	2	232,645	12	70.90
1983	16	0	3	1	256,158	10	70.88
1984	13	1	2	1	272,595	15	70.75
1985	15	0	2	1	165,456	43	71.81
1986	15	1 (1)	0	0	226,015	34	71.56
1987	11	0	0	0	64,686	127	72.89
1988	9	0	0	0	28,845	177	72.78
1989	10	0	0	0	96,594	129	72.35
1990	9	0	0	0	68,045	160	73.71
1991	8	0	0	0	123,796	122	71.61
1992	8	0	0	0	14,868	223	72.29
1993	10	0	0	0	51,532	182	72.96
1994	8	0	0	0	11,514	248	74.79
1995	10	0	0	0	68,180	179	72.69
1996	7	0	0	0	137,779	208	73.50
1997	7	0	0	0	85,383	174	72.91
1998	5	0	0	0	128,157	172	71.10
1999	2	0	0	0	5,075	T322	73.25
2000	8	0	0	0	17,244	229	73.56
2001	4	0	0	0	0	n/a	73.08
2002	1	0	0	0	8,910	241	75.00
2003	4	0	0	0	0	n/a	75.61
2004	2	0	0	0	11,130	251	74.16
2005	3	0	0	0	0	n/a	75.33
Career	586	73 (18)	58	36	5,734,031	189	71.80

- Green background for 1st. Yellow background for top-10.
- All-time money list rank is complete as of February 23, 2011.
- Nicklaus' position on the all-time money list is misleading, given he is regarded as one of the greatest golfers of all time. Tournament purses have expanded considerably since his prime. For example, Nicklaus received $144,000 for winning the Masters in 1986 while Zach Johnson received $1,305,000 for winning the Masters in 2007. He led the list through the 1988 season.
- Despite leading the Tour in scoring average eight times, Nicklaus never won the Vardon Trophy because he often did not play the minimum required number of rounds to qualify for the trophy. Prior to 1988, the minimum number of rounds was 80 vs. 60 today.

== Amateur wins (18) ==
- 1953 Ohio State Junior Championship (13–15 yrs)
- 1954 Tri-State High School Championship (Ohio, Kentucky, Indiana), Ohio State Junior Championship (13–15 yrs)
- 1955 Ohio State Junior Championship (13–15 yrs)
- 1956 Columbus Amateur Match-play Championship
- 1957 International Jaycee Junior Golf Tournament
- 1958 Trans-Mississippi Amateur, Queen City Open Championship
- 1959 Trans-Mississippi Amateur, U.S. Amateur, North and South Amateur, Royal St. George's Challenge Cup
- 1960 Eisenhower Trophy (individual), Colonial Invitational
- 1961 U.S. Amateur, NCAA Championship (individual), Big Ten Conference Championship (individual), Western Amateur

=== Amateur major wins (2) ===
Year	Championship	Winning score	Runner-up
1959	U.S. Amateur	1 up	(United States) Charles Coe
1961	U.S. Amateur	8 & 6	(United States) Dudley Wysong

=== Results timeline ===
Tournament	1955	1956	1957	1958	1959	1960	1961
U.S. Amateur	R256	R64	R32	R128	1	R32	1
The Amateur Championship					QF		

Win
Top 10
Did not play

R256, R128, R64, R32, R16, QF, SF = Round in which player lost in match play

== Professional wins (117) ==
=== PGA Tour wins (73) ===
Legend
Major championships (18)
Players Championships (3)
Other PGA Tour (52)

No.	Date	Tournament	Winning score	Margin of victory	Runner(s)-up
1	Jun 17, 1962	U.S. Open	−1 (72-70-72-69=283)	Playoff	(United States) Arnold Palmer
2	Sep 16, 1962	Seattle World's Fair Open Invitational	−15 (67-65-65-68=265)	2 strokes	(United States) Tony Lema
3	Sep 23, 1962	Portland Open Invitational	−19 (64-69-67-69=269)	1 stroke	(United States) George Bayer
4	Feb 4, 1963	Palm Springs Golf Classic	−13 (69-66-67-71-72=345)	Playoff	(South Africa) Gary Player
5	Apr 7, 1963	Masters Tournament	−2 (74-66-74-72=286)	1 stroke	(United States) Tony Lema
6	May 5, 1963	Tournament of Champions	−15 (64-68-72-69=273)	5 strokes	(United States) Tony Lema, (United States) Arnold Palmer
7	Jul 21, 1963	PGA Championship	−5 (69-73-69-68=279)	2 strokes	(United States) Dave Ragan
8	Oct 20, 1963	Sahara Invitational	−8 (75-66-66-69=276)	1 stroke	(United States) Gay Brewer, (United States) Al Geiberger
9	Feb 9, 1964	Phoenix Open	−13 (71-66-68-66=271)	3 strokes	(United States) Bob Brue
10	May 3, 1964	Tournament of Champions (2)	−9 (68-73-65-73=279)	2 strokes	(United States) Al Geiberger, (United States) Doug Sanders
11	Jul 5, 1964	Whitemarsh Open Invitational	−12 (69-70-70-67=276)	1 stroke	(South Africa) Gary Player
12	Sep 20, 1964	Portland Open Invitational (2)	−13 (68-72-68-67=275)	3 strokes	(United States) Ken Venturi
13	Apr 11, 1965	Masters Tournament (2)	−17 (67-71-64-69=271)	9 strokes	(United States) Arnold Palmer, (South Africa) Gary Player
14	May 23, 1965	Memphis Open Invitational	−9 (67-68-71-65=271)	Playoff	(United States) Johnny Pott
15	Aug 1, 1965	Thunderbird Classic	−18 (67-66-69-68=270)	2 strokes	(South Africa) Gary Player
16	Aug 8, 1965	Philadelphia Golf Classic (2)	−11 (71-65-73-68=277)	1 stroke	(United States) Joe Campbell, (United States) Doug Sanders
17	Sep 19, 1965	Portland Open Invitational (3)	−15 (69-68-68-68=273)	3 strokes	(United States) Dave Marr
18	Apr 11, 1966	Masters Tournament (3)	E (68-76-72-72=288)	Playoff	(United States) Tommy Jacobs (2nd), (United States) Gay Brewer (3rd)
19	Jul 9, 1966	The Open Championship	−2 (70-67-75-70=282)	1 stroke	(United States) Doug Sanders, (Wales) Dave Thomas
20	Oct 15, 1966	Sahara Invitational (2)	−2 (71-77-68-66=282)	3 strokes	(United States) Miller Barber, (United States) Arnold Palmer
21	Jan 23, 1967	Bing Crosby National Pro-Am	−4 (69-73-74-68=284)	5 strokes	(United States) Billy Casper
22	Jun 18, 1967	U.S. Open (2)	−5 (71-67-72-65=275)	4 strokes	(United States) Arnold Palmer
23	Aug 6, 1967	Western Open	−10 (72-68-65-69=274)	2 strokes	(United States) Doug Sanders
24	Aug 30, 1967	Westchester Classic	−16 (67-69-65-71=272)	1 stroke	(United States) Dan Sikes
25	Oct 28, 1967	Sahara Invitational (3)	−14 (68-69-62-71=270)	1 stroke	(United States) Steve Spray
26	Aug 4, 1968	Western Open (2)	−11 (65-72-65-71=273)	3 strokes	(United States) Miller Barber
27	Aug 11, 1968	American Golf Classic	E (70-69-72-69=280)	Playoff	(United States) Frank Beard, (United States) Lee Elder
28	Feb 2, 1969	Andy Williams-San Diego Open Invitational	−4 (68-72-71-73=284)	1 stroke	(United States) Gene Littler
29	Oct 19, 1969	Sahara Invitational (4)	−12 (69-68-70-65=272)	4 strokes	(United States) Frank Beard
30	Nov 3, 1969	Kaiser International Open Invitational	−15 (66-67-69-71=273)	Playoff	(United States) George Archer, (United States) Billy Casper, (United States) Don January
31	May 3, 1970	Byron Nelson Golf Classic	−6 (67-68-68-71=274)	Playoff	(United States) Arnold Palmer
32	Jul 12, 1970	The Open Championship (2)	−5 (68-69-73-73=283)	Playoff	(United States) Doug Sanders
33	Jul 26, 1970	National Four-Ball Team Championship (with (United States) Arnold Palmer)	−25 (61-67-64-67=259)	3 strokes	(United States) George Archer and (United States) Bobby Nichols, (Australia) Bruce Crampton and (United States) Orville Moody, (United States) Gardner Dickinson and (United States) Sam Snead
34	Feb 28, 1971	PGA Championship (2)	−7 (69-69-70-73=281)	2 strokes	(United States) Billy Casper
35	Apr 25, 1971	Tournament of Champions (2)	−9 (69-71-69-70=279)	8 strokes	(Australia) Bruce Devlin, (South Africa) Gary Player, (United States) Dave Stockton
36	May 9, 1971	Byron Nelson Golf Classic (2)	−6 (69-71-68-66=274)	2 strokes	(United States) Frank Beard, (United States) Jerry McGee
37	Aug 1, 1971	National Team Championship (2) (with (United States) Arnold Palmer)	−27 (62-64-65-66=257)	6 strokes	(United States) Julius Boros and (United States) Bill Collins, (New Zealand) Bob Charles and (Australia) Bruce Devlin
38	Dec 6, 1971	Walt Disney World Golf Classic	−15 (67-68-70-68=273)	3 strokes	(United States) Deane Beman
39	Jan 16, 1972	Bing Crosby National Pro-Am (2)	−4 (66-74-71-73=284)	Playoff	(United States) Johnny Miller
40	Mar 5, 1972	Doral-Eastern Open	−12 (71-71-64-70=276)	2 strokes	(United States) Bob Rosburg, (United States) Lee Trevino
41	Apr 9, 1972	Masters Tournament (4)	−2 (68-71-73-74=286)	3 strokes	(Australia) Bruce Crampton, (United States) Bobby Mitchell, (United States) Tom Weiskopf
42	Jun 18, 1972	U.S. Open (3)	+2 (71-73-72-74=290)	3 strokes	(Australia) Bruce Crampton
43	Aug 13, 1972	Westchester Classic (2)	−18 (65-67-70-68=270)	3 strokes	(United States) Jim Colbert
44	Aug 27, 1972	U.S. Professional Match Play Championship	2 and 1		(United States) Frank Beard
45	Dec 3, 1972	Walt Disney World Golf Classic (2)	−21 (68-68-67-64=267)	9 strokes	(United States) Jim Dent, (United States) Bobby Mitchell, (United States) Larry Wood
46	Jan 28, 1973	Bing Crosby National Pro-Am (3)	−6 (71-69-71-71=282)	Playoff	(United States) Raymond Floyd, (United States) Orville Moody
47	Mar 25, 1973	Greater New Orleans Open	−8 (68-72-71-69=280)	Playoff	(United States) Miller Barber
48	Apr 22, 1973	Tournament of Champions (4)	−12 (70-70-68-68=276)	1 stroke	(United States) Lee Trevino
49	May 27, 1973	Atlanta Classic	−16 (67-66-66-73=272)	2 strokes	(United States) Tom Weiskopf
50	Aug 12, 1973	PGA Championship (3)	−7 (72-68-68-69=277)	4 strokes	(Australia) Bruce Crampton
51	Oct 7, 1973	Ohio Kings Island Open	−13 (68-69-62-72=271)	6 strokes	(United States) Lee Trevino
52	Dec 1, 1973	Walt Disney World Golf Classic (3)	−13 (70-71-67-67=275)	1 stroke	(United States) Mason Rudolph
53	Feb 3, 1974	Hawaiian Open	−17 (65-67-69-70=271)	3 strokes	(United States) Eddie Pearce
54	Sep 2, 1974	Tournament Players Championship	−16 (66-71-68-67=272)	2 strokes	(United States) J. C. Snead
55	Mar 16, 1975	Doral-Eastern Open (2)	−12 (69-70-69-68=276)	3 strokes	(United States) Forrest Fezler, (United States) Bert Yancey
56	Mar 30, 1975	Sea Pines Heritage Classic	−13 (66-63-74-68=271)	3 strokes	(United States) Tom Weiskopf
57	Apr 13, 1975	Masters Tournament (5)	−12 (68-67-73-68=276)	1 stroke	(United States) Johnny Miller, (United States) Tom Weiskopf
58	Aug 10, 1975	PGA Championship (4)	−4 (70-68-67-71=276)	2 strokes	(Australia) Bruce Crampton
59	Sep 14, 1975	World Open Golf Championship	−4 (70-71-70-69=280)	Playoff	(United States) Billy Casper
60	Mar 1, 1976	Tournament Players Championship (2)	−19 (66-70-68-65=269)	3 strokes	(United States) J. C. Snead
61	Sep 5, 1976	World Series of Golf	−5 (68-70-69-68=275)	4 strokes	(United States) Hale Irwin
62	Feb 27, 1977	Jackie Gleason-Inverrary Classic	−13 (70-66-69-70=275)	5 strokes	(South Africa) Gary Player
63	Apr 17, 1977	MONY Tournament of Champions (5)	−7 (71-69-70-71=281)	Playoff	(United States) Bruce Lietzke
64	May 23, 1977	Memorial Tournament	−7 (72-68-70-71=281)	2 strokes	(United States) Hubert Green
65	Feb 26, 1978	Jackie Gleason-Inverrary Classic (2)	−12 (70-75-66-65=276)	1 stroke	(United States) Grier Jones
66	Mar 19, 1978	Tournament Players Championship (3)	+1 (70-71-73-75=289)	1 stroke	(United States) Lou Graham
67	Jul 15, 1978	The Open Championship (3)	−7 (71-72-69-69=281)	2 strokes	(United States) Ben Crenshaw, (United States) Raymond Floyd, (United States) Tom Kite, (New Zealand) Simon Owen
68	Jul 23, 1978	IVB-Philadelphia Golf Classic (3)	−14 (66-64-72-68=270)	1 stroke	(United States) Gil Morgan
69	Jun 15, 1980	U.S. Open (4)	−8 (63-71-70-68=272)	2 strokes	(Japan) Isao Aoki
70	Aug 10, 1980	PGA Championship (5)	−6 (70-69-66-69=274)	7 strokes	(United States) Andy Bean
71	May 16, 1982	Colonial National Invitation	−7 (66-70-70-67=273)	3 strokes	(United States) Andy North
72	May 27, 1984	Memorial Tournament (2)	−8 (69-70-71-70=280)	Playoff	(United States) Andy Bean
73	Apr 13, 1986	Masters Tournament (6)	−9 (74-71-69-65=279)	1 stroke	(United States) Tom Kite, (Australia) Greg Norman

PGA Tour playoff record (14–10)

No.	Year	Tournament	Opponent(s)	Result
1	1962	Houston Classic	(United States) Bobby Nichols, (United States) Dan Sikes	Nichols won with eagle on first extra hole after 18-hole playoff; Nichols: +1 (71), Sikes: +1 (71), Nicklaus: +6 (76)
2	1962	U.S. Open	(United States) Arnold Palmer	Won 18-hole playoff; Nicklaus: E (71), Palmer: +3 (74)
3	1963	Palm Springs Golf Classic	(South Africa) Gary Player	Won 18-hole playoff; Nicklaus: −7 (65), Player: +1 (73)
4	1963	Western Open	(United States) Julius Boros, (United States) Arnold Palmer	Palmer won 18-hole playoff; Palmer: −1 (70), Boros: E (71), Nicklaus: +2 (73)
5	1965	Pensacola Open Invitational	(United States) Doug Sanders	Lost to birdie on third extra hole
6	1965	Memphis Open Invitational	(United States) Johnny Pott	Won with par on first extra hole
7	1966	Masters Tournament	(United States) Tommy Jacobs (2nd), (United States) Gay Brewer (3rd)	Won 18-hole playoff; Nicklaus: −2 (70), Jacobs: E (72), Brewer: +6 (78)
8	1968	American Golf Classic	(United States) Frank Beard, (United States) Lee Elder	Won with birdie on fifth extra hole Beard eliminated by birdie on first hole
9	1969	Kaiser International Open Invitational	(United States) George Archer, (United States) Billy Casper, (United States) Don January	Won with birdie on second extra hole January eliminated by birdie on first hole
10	1970	Byron Nelson Golf Classic	(United States) Arnold Palmer	Won with birdie on first extra hole
11	1970	The Open Championship	(United States) Doug Sanders	Won 18-hole playoff; Nicklaus: E (72), Sanders: +1 (73)
12	1971	Atlanta Classic	(United States) Gardner Dickinson	Lost to par on first extra hole
13	1971	U.S. Open	(United States) Lee Trevino	Lost 18-hole playoff Trevino: −2 (68), Nicklaus: +1 (71)
14	1972	Bing Crosby National Pro-Am	(United States) Johnny Miller	Won with birdie on first extra hole
15	1972	Tournament of Champions	(United States) Bobby Mitchell	Lost to birdie on first extra hole
16	1973	Bing Crosby National Pro-Am	(United States) Raymond Floyd, (United States) Orville Moody	Won with birdie on first extra hole
17	1973	Greater New Orleans Open	(United States) Miller Barber	Won with birdie on second extra hole
18	1974	World Open Golf Championship	(United States) Frank Beard, (United States) Johnny Miller (United States) Bob Murphy	Miller won with birdie on second extra hole Murphy eliminated by par on first hole
19	1975	Canadian Open	(United States) Tom Weiskopf	Lost to birdie on first extra hole
20	1975	World Open Golf Championship	(United States) Billy Casper	Won with par on first extra hole
21	1977	MONY Tournament of Champions	(United States) Bruce Lietzke	Won with birdie on third extra hole
22	1980	Doral-Eastern Open	(United States) Raymond Floyd	Lost to birdie on second extra hole
23	1982	Bay Hill Classic	(United States) Tom Kite, (Zimbabwe) Denis Watson	Kite won with birdie on first extra hole
24	1984	Memorial Tournament	(United States) Andy Bean	Won with par on third extra hole

=== European Tour wins (9) ===
Legend
Major championships (9)
Other European Tour (0)

No.	Date	Tournament	Winning score	Margin of victory	Runner(s)-up
1	Apr 9, 1972	Masters Tournament	−2 (68-71-73-74=286)	3 strokes	(Australia) Bruce Crampton, (United States) Bobby Mitchell, (United States) Tom Weiskopf
2	Jun 18, 1972	U.S. Open	+2 (71-73-72-74=290)	3 strokes	(Australia) Bruce Crampton
3	Aug 12, 1973	PGA Championship	−7 (72-68-68-69=277)	4 strokes	(Australia) Bruce Crampton
4	Apr 13, 1975	Masters Tournament (2)	−12 (68-67-73-68=276)	1 stroke	(United States) Johnny Miller, (United States) Tom Weiskopf
5	Aug 10, 1975	PGA Championship (2)	−4 (70-68-67-71=276)	2 strokes	(Australia) Bruce Crampton
6	Jul 15, 1978	The Open Championship	−7 (71-72-69-69=281)	2 strokes	(United States) Ben Crenshaw, (United States) Raymond Floyd, (United States) Tom Kite, (New Zealand) Simon Owen
7	Jun 15, 1980	U.S. Open (2)	−8 (63-71-70-68=272)	2 strokes	(Japan) Isao Aoki
8	Aug 10, 1980	PGA Championship (3)	−6 (70-69-66-69=274)	7 strokes	(United States) Andy Bean
9	Apr 13, 1986	Masters Tournament (3)	−9 (74-71-69-65=279)	1 stroke	(United States) Tom Kite, (Australia) Greg Norman

=== PGA Tour of Australasia wins (3) ===
No.	Date	Tournament	Winning score	Margin of victory	Runner-up
1	Nov 2, 1975	Australian Open	−9 (67-70-70-72=279)	3 strokes	(United States) Bill Brask
2	Oct 31, 1976	Australian Open (2)	−2 (72-71-72-71=286)	4 strokes	(United States) Curtis Strange
3	Nov 19, 1978	Australian Open (3)	−4 (73-66-74-71=284)	6 strokes	(United States) Ben Crenshaw

=== Other wins (24) ===
No.	Date	Tournament	Winning score	Margin of victory	Runner(s)-up
1	Jul 29, 1956	Ohio Open (as an amateur)	−2 (76-70-64-72=282)	2 strokes	(United States) Dan Cawley
2	Sep 9, 1962	World Series of Golf	−5 (66-69=135)	4 strokes	(United States) Arnold Palmer, (South Africa) Gary Player
3	Sep 8, 1963	World Series of Golf (2)	E (70-70=140)	1 stroke	(United States) Julius Boros
4	Oct 28, 1963	Canada Cup (with (United States) Arnold Palmer)	−22 (136-142-138-66=482) (Note: Shortened to 54/63 holes due to weather.)	3 strokes	Spain − Sebastián Miguel and Ramón Sota
5	Oct 28, 1963	Canada Cup Individual Trophy	−15 (67-72-66-32=237)	5 strokes	(Spain) Sebastián Miguel, (South Africa) Gary Player
6	Nov 1, 1964	Australian Open	−1 (75-71-74-67=287)	Playoff	(Australia) Bruce Devlin
7	Dec 6, 1964	Canada Cup (2) (with (United States) Arnold Palmer)	−22 (138-136-132-148=554)	11 strokes	Argentina − Roberto De Vicenzo and Leopoldo Ruiz
8	Dec 6, 1964	Canada Cup Individual Trophy (2)	−12 (72-69-65-70=276)	2 strokes	(United States) Arnold Palmer
9	Nov 14, 1966	Canada Cup (3) (with (United States) Arnold Palmer)	−28 (135-135-136-142=548)	5 strokes	South Africa − Harold Henning and Gary Player
10	Dec 11, 1966	PGA Team Championship (with (United States) Arnold Palmer)	−32 (63-66-63-64=256)	3 strokes	(United States) Al Besselink and (United States) Doug Sanders
11	Sep 10, 1967	World Series of Golf (3)	+4 (74-70=144)	1 stroke	(United States) Gay Brewer
12	Nov 12, 1967	World Cup (4) (with (United States) Arnold Palmer)	−19 (140-141-140-136=557)	13 strokes	New Zealand − Bob Charles and Walter Godfrey
13	Oct 27, 1968	Australian Open (2)	−18 (71-64-68-67=270)	1 stroke	(South Africa) Gary Player
14	Sep 13, 1970	World Series of Golf (2)	−4 (66-70=136)	3 strokes	(United States) Billy Casper, (United States) Dave Stockton
15	Oct 10, 1970	Piccadilly World Match Play Championship	2 and 1		(United States) Lee Trevino
16	Oct 31, 1971	Qantas Australian Open (3)	−19 (68-65-66-70=269)	8 strokes	(Australia) Bruce Crampton
17	Nov 7, 1971	Dunlop International	−14 (69-62-73-70=274)	7 strokes	(Australia) Bruce Crampton, (England) Peter Oosterhuis
18	Nov 14, 1971	World Cup (5) (with (United States) Lee Trevino)	−21 (143-138-134-140=555)	12 strokes	South Africa − Harold Henning and Gary Player
19	Nov 14, 1971	World Cup Individual Trophy (3)	−17 (68-69-63-71=271)	7 strokes	(South Africa) Gary Player
20	Nov 25, 1973	World Cup (6) (with (United States) Johnny Miller)	−18 (142-133-145-138=558)	6 strokes	South Africa − Hugh Baiocchi and Gary Player
21	Jul 26, 1977	Jerry Ford Invitational	−5 (66)	5 strokes	(United States) Pat Bradley, (United States) Pat Rea
22	Dec 18, 1983	Chrysler Team Championship (with (United States) Johnny Miller)	−11 (61-65-65=191)	1 stroke	(United States) Al Geiberger and (England) Peter Oosterhuis
23	Nov 25, 1984	Skins Game	$240,000	$120,000	(United States) Tom Watson
24	Dec 5, 1999	Office Depot Father/Son Challenge (with son Gary Nicklaus)	−25 (60-59=119)	Playoff	(United States) Raymond Floyd and son Robert Floyd

Other playoff record (2–1)

No.	Year	Tournament	Opponent(s)	Result
1	1964	Australian Open	(Australia) Bruce Devlin	Won 18-hole playoff; Nicklaus: −5 (67), Devlin: −2 (70)
2	1966	World Series of Golf	(United States) Al Geiberger, (United States) Gene Littler	Littler won with birdie on first extra hole
3	1999	Office Depot Father/Son Challenge (with son Gary Nicklaus)	(United States) Raymond Floyd and son Robert Floyd	Won with birdie on third extra hole

=== Senior PGA Tour wins (10) ===
Legend
Senior PGA Tour major championships (8)
Other Senior PGA Tour (2)

No.	Date	Tournament	Winning score	Margin of victory	Runner(s)-up
1	Apr 1, 1990	The Tradition	−10 (71-67-68=206)	4 strokes	(South Africa) Gary Player
2	Jun 10, 1990	Mazda Senior Tournament Players Championship	−27 (65-68-64-64=261)	6 strokes	(United States) Lee Trevino
3	Apr 7, 1991	The Tradition (2)	−11 (71-73-66-67=277)	1 stroke	(United States) Jim Colbert, (United States) Jim Dent, (United States) Phil Rodgers
4	Apr 21, 1991	PGA Seniors' Championship	−17 (66-66-69-70=271)	6 strokes	(Australia) Bruce Crampton
5	Jul 29, 1991	U.S. Senior Open	+2 (72-69-70-71=282)	Playoff	(United States) Chi-Chi Rodríguez
6	Jul 11, 1993	U.S. Senior Open (2)	−6 (68-73-67-70=278)	1 stroke	(United States) Tom Weiskopf
7	Jan 9, 1994	Mercedes Championships	−9 (73-69-69-68=279)	1 stroke	(United States) Bob Murphy
8	Apr 2, 1995	The Tradition (3)	−12 (69-71-69-67=276)	Playoff	(Japan) Isao Aoki
9	Feb 18, 1996	GTE Suncoast Classic	−2 (76-68-67=211)	1 stroke	(United States) J. C. Snead
10	Apr 7, 1996	The Tradition (4)	−16 (68-74-65-65=272)	3 strokes	(United States) Hale Irwin

Senior PGA Tour playoff record (2–1)

No.	Year	Tournament	Opponent	Result
1	1991	U.S. Senior Open	(United States) Chi-Chi Rodríguez	Won 18-hole playoff; Nicklaus: −5 (65), Rodríguez: −1 (69)
2	1995	The Tradition	(Japan) Isao Aoki	Won with birdie on third extra hole
3	1995	Ford Senior Players Championship	(United States) J. C. Snead	Lost to birdie on first extra hole

=== Other senior wins (7) ===
No.	Date	Tournament	Winning score	Margin of victory	Runner(s)-up
1	Jan 27, 1991	Senior Skins Game	$310,000	$185,000	(United States) Lee Trevino
2	Dec 12, 1999	Diners Club Matches (with (United States) Tom Watson)	1 up		(United States) Bruce Fleisher and (Australia) David Graham
3	Dec 17, 2000	Hyundai Team Matches (2) (with (United States) Tom Watson)	4 and 2		(United States) Bruce Fleisher and (Australia) David Graham
4	Feb 6, 2005	Wendy's Champions Skins Game (2)	$340,000	$160,000	(United States) Craig Stadler
5	Jan 14, 2007	Wendy's Champions Skins Game (3) (with (United States) Tom Watson)	$320,000	$30,000	(United States) Jay Haas and (South Africa) Gary Player
6	Jan 17, 2010	Wendy's Champions Skins Game (4) (with (United States) Tom Watson)	$350,000	$120,000	(United States) Ben Crenshaw and (United States) Fuzzy Zoeller
7	Jan 30, 2011	Wendy's Champions Skins Game (5) (with (United States) Tom Watson)	$310,000	$10,000	(Germany) Bernhard Langer and (United States) Mark O'Meara

== Miscellaneous stats ==
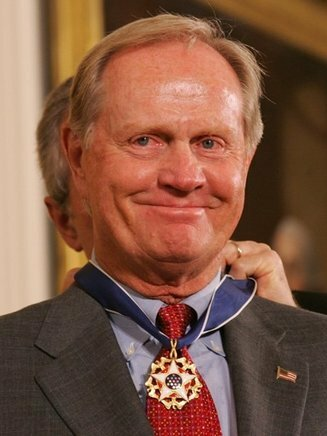
President Bush awarding Nicklaus the Presidential Medal of Freedom in 2005

- Nicklaus won the prestigious The Players Championship three times (though never at the TPC at Sawgrass, the current Players site and a course whose setup he harshly criticized in the early 1980s, likening some of its approach shots to "stopping a 5-iron on the hood of a car"). He was the first multiple winner of this event and remains the only three-time champion winning three of the first five contested (1974, 1976, and 1978). Nicklaus' 19-under par score of 269 in 1976 was the record for this championship until 1994, when Greg Norman shot 24-under par, and remains the second lowest 72-hole score for the championship.
- Nicklaus won various events around the globe, including six Australian Opens (1964, 1968, 1971, 1975, 1976 and 1978) and the Piccadilly World Match Play Championship in 1970.
- From 1963 to 1977, Nicklaus won the Tournament of Champions a record five times with one runner-up playoff finish. Of these five victories, he recorded an eight-shot winning margin in 1971, which is also a record.
- Nicklaus is third to Sam Snead (82) and Tiger Woods (82) on the all-time list of players with most PGA Tour wins, having accumulated 73 titles. Of these 73 wins, 66 were against full-field populations, while only seven were against limited fields.
- Nicklaus total wins of 73, total runners-up finishes of 58, and total third-place finishes of 36 is an unmatched total of 167 top-three finishes on the PGA Tour. In addition, Nicklaus registered 218 top-five and 310 top-10 finishes.
- At age 16, Nicklaus won the Ohio Open against a field of mainly professional golfers. While not an official PGA win, it was previously sanctioned as such and former champions include three-time winner Byron Nelson, among others.
- In 17 consecutive seasons from 1962 to 1978, Nicklaus won at least two PGA Tour titles per season, and always finished in the top four on the money list. During these years British Open winnings were not included in the official money list rankings. If so, Nicklaus would have finished no worse than third in any year since he won that major in 1970 and 1978 and his additional top finishes would likely have affected other years' placings.
- Nicklaus won a total of eight USGA national championships, including two U.S. Amateurs (1959 and 1961), four U.S. Opens (1962, 1967, 1972, and 1980), and two U.S. Senior Opens (1991 and 1993).
- Nicklaus is the first player to win the U.S. Amateur and the U.S. Open at the same course Pebble Beach Golf Links in 1961 and 1972, respectively. The second player is Matt Fitzpatrick, who accomplished the feat at The Country Club in 2013 and 2022, respectively.
- From 1970 to 1976, Nicklaus made 105 consecutive cuts which at the time was second only to Byron Nelson's record of 113.
- Nicklaus won the inaugural semi-full field World Series of Golf championship in 1976 by four shots over Hale Irwin. This marked his third different official PGA event (1968 American Golf Classic and the 1975 PGA Championship) victory at Firestone Country Club and excludes four earlier wins in the old World Series of Golf format from 1962 through 1975.
- Nicklaus shot a course record 59 for 18 holes during an exhibition event. 1973 American Cancer Society's Palm Beach Golf Classic played at The Breakers. The course was a par 70. The other players Sam Snead shot 69, Kathy Whitworth shot 69 and Kathy Ahern shot 74.
- Nicklaus was the first PGA Tour player to reach the $2,000,000 mark in career earnings (December 1, 1973), $3,000,000 (May 2, 1977), $4,000,000 (February 6, 1983), and $5,000,000 (August 20, 1988).
- Nicklaus was the PGA Tour's career money leader from 1973 to 1988.
- Nicklaus was a member of a record-tying six World Cup teams all of which being victorious and a record-tying combination of four with Arnold Palmer. Nicklaus also won a record-setting three individual International Trophy titles in the competition, was runner-up once, and finished third twice.
- Nicklaus played his way onto six Ryder Cup teams beginning in 1969. However, by today's qualification standards, he would have been eligible for the 1963, 1965, and 1967 teams. In addition, captain's picks were not available until 1989. If prior, Nicklaus would likely have been on the 1979 team, increasing his total to 10.
- Nicklaus played in his first PGA tournament at age 18 in the 1958 Rubber City Open Invitational at Akron's Firestone Country Club, was one stroke back of the lead at halfway point with rounds of 67 and 66 and finished 76-68 for 12th spot.
- At the 1990 Senior Players Championship, Nicklaus shot a 27-under-par 261 at Dearborn Country Club, the lowest 72-hole total in Champions Tour history, Pádraig Harrington tied this record in winning the 2022 Charles Schwab Cup Championship.
- In 1996, Nicklaus was the first person to win the same Senior PGA Tour (now the Champions Tour) event four times, when he captured The Tradition tournament.
- Nicklaus is the only person in the history of the PGA to win all of the major championships on both the PGA Tour and Champions Tour. (Although he never won the Senior British Open, it was not recognized as a major in the United States until 2003, after he had stopped playing the Champions Tour.)
- Nicklaus is 14–10 in PGA Tour playoffs (including the 1970 Open Championship), which incorporates a 3–1 record in major championships. Nicklaus also holds a 2–1 record in Champions Tour playoffs.
- Nicklaus has made 20 career holes-in-one in competition.

== U.S. national team appearances ==
=== As player ===
Amateur

- Walker Cup: 1959 (winners), 1961 (winners)
- Eisenhower Trophy: 1960 (team winners and individual leader)
- Americas Cup: 1960 (winners), 1961 (winners)

Professional

- Ryder Cup: 1969 (tie), 1971 (winners), 1973 (winners), 1975 (winners), 1977 (winners), 1981 (winners)
  - Cumulative 17–8–3 record across six matches: 8–1–0 record in foursomes matches, 5–3–1 record in four-ball matches, 4–4–2 record in singles matches, for a combined point total of 18.5 and a 66% win percentage.
- World Cup: 1963 (winners, individual winner), 1964 (winners, individual winner), 1965, 1966 (winners), 1967 (winners), 1971 (winners, individual winner), 1973 (winners)
- Wendy's 3-Tour Challenge (representing Senior PGA Tour): 1992, 1993 (winners), 1994, 1995 (winners), 1997, 1999 (winners), 2001

=== As captain ===
Professional

- Ryder Cup: 1983 (winners), 1987
- Presidents Cup: 1998, 2003 (tie), 2005 (winners), 2007 (winners)

== Awards ==
- Named greatest golfer/athlete by Sports Illustrated; Golf Magazine; Associated Press; Golfweek; Golf World; PGA Tour and GolfWeb; ESPN; British Broadcasting Company; and Today's Golfer.
- Named golfer of the Century/Millennium by Asian Golf Monthly, Associated Press, British Broadcasting Company, Golf Digest, Golf Magazine, Golf Monthly, Golfweek, Golf Web, Golf World, International Association of Golf Tour Operators, PGA Tour, Today's Golfer.
- Named Florida Athlete of the Century.
- Received a Doctor of Athletic Arts Honorary Degree from Ohio State University, 1972.
- Inducted into the World Golf Hall of Fame in the inaugural class of 1974.
- Received a Doctor of Laws Honorary Degree from the University of St. Andrews in Scotland.
- Inducted into the Memorial Honorees at the Memorial Tournament, 2000.
- Received the Vince Lombardi Award of Excellence in 2001 being the first golfer and only the third athlete in the award's history.
- Presidential Medal of Freedom recipient in 2005
- Inducted into the PGA Golf Professional Hall of Fame in the class of 2006.
- Presented with the Woodrow Wilson Award for Corporate Citizenship by the Woodrow Wilson Center of the Smithsonian Institution in Palm Beach, Florida; January 2008.
- Presented with the Charlie Bartlett Award from the Golf Writers Association of America at its annual awards dinner in Augusta, Georgia in April 2009 recognizing four decades of charitable work with children.
- Presented with the National Pathfinder Award at the annual Pathfinder Awards Banquet in June 2009 at Conseco Fieldhouse in Indiana for decades of dedication to youth in need, most recently through the Nicklaus Children's Health Care Foundation.
- Congressional Gold Medal recipient in 2015; he joins golfers Arnold Palmer and Byron Nelson.
- Awarded Star #41 on The Flag for Hope on June 30, 2016; in recognition of his exceptional PGA career and his philanthropic efforts to assist children in need via the Nicklaus Children's Health Care Foundation.

This list is probably incomplete.

1962

- PGA Tour Rookie of the Year

1964

- PGA Tour Money Winner
- PGA Tour Scoring Average Leader

1965

- PGA Tour Money Winner
- PGA Tour Scoring Average Leader

1967

- PGA Player of the Year
- PGA Tour Money Winner

1971

- PGA Tour Money Winner
- PGA Tour Scoring Average Leader

1972

- Doctor of Athletic Arts Honorary Degree, Ohio State University
- PGA Player of the Year
- PGA Tour Money Winner
- PGA Tour Scoring Average Leader

1973

- PGA Player of the Year
- PGA Tour Money Winner
- PGA Tour Scoring Average Leader

1974

- World Golf Hall of Fame
- PGA Tour Scoring Average Leader

1975

- Bob Jones Award
- PGA Player of the Year
- PGA Tour Money Winner
- PGA Tour Scoring Average Leader

1976

- PGA Player of the Year
- PGA Tour Money Winner
- PGA Tour Scoring Average Leader

1978

- Sports Illustrated Sportsman of the Year

1979

- AP Athlete of the Decade (named by national sports writers)
- Golfer of the Seventies

1980

- BBC Sports Personality of the Year Overseas Personality
- Golf World Player of the Year

1984

- Doctor of Laws Honorary Degree, University of St. Andrews
- National High School Hall of Fame

1988

- Golfer of the Century (named by golfing officials and journalists from around the world)

1993

- Golf Course Architect of the Year (named by Golf World)

1995

- Canadian Golf Hall of Fame

1996

- Golfer of The Century (named by Golf Monthly magazine)

1999

- Best Individual Male Athlete of the 20th Century (named by Sports Illustrated)

2000

- Payne Stewart Award
- PGA of America Distinguished Service Award
- Memorial Honoree, Memorial Tournament

2001

- ESPY Lifetime Achievement Award
- Vince Lombardi Award of Excellence

2003

- Greater Columbus Hospitality Award
- Muhammad Ali Sports Legend Awards
- The Three Amigos George Bush Inspiration Award

2005

- GCSAA Old Tom Morris Award
- Presidential Medal of Freedom

2006

- PGA Golf Professional Hall of Fame

2007

- Boy Scouts of America Distinguished Citizens Award
- Francis Ouimet Lifelong Contributions to Golf

2008

- PGA Tour Lifetime Achievement Award
- Woodrow Wilson Award for Corporate Citizenship

2009

- Charlie Bartlett Award
- Golf Course Architect of the Year in Asia Pacific
- National Pathfinder Award

2015

- Congressional Gold Medal

2022

- Freedom of St Andrews
