= Wire-to-wire =

Concept in competitive events and sports

Wire-to-wire is a term used in competitive events and sports for a champion who maintained the lead during an entire competition. The term originated from horse racing where a wire would stretch across the start and finish line, so it describes a horse that leads from wire to wire, or from start to finish.

== Australian-rules football ==
Only seven teams have completed a wire-to-wire premiership season in the Australian Football League (formerly called the Victorian Football League from 1897 to 1989): Fitzroy in 1904, Collingwood in 1915, Essendon in 1923 and 2000, Geelong in 1953, West Coast in 1991, and Port Adelaide in 2020.

== Baseball ==
Only six teams have completed wire-to-wire regular seasons in Major League Baseball and won the World Series: the 1927 New York Yankees, 1955 Brooklyn Dodgers, 1984 Detroit Tigers, 1990 Cincinnati Reds, 2005 Chicago White Sox and 2024 Los Angeles Dodgers. The 1923 New York Giants, 1997 Baltimore Orioles, 1998 Cleveland Indians, 2001 Seattle Mariners, and 2003 San Francisco Giants are the only five teams to have completed a wire-to-wire season and not win the World Series.

In the KBO League, the SSG Landers accomplished this feat by occupying the top position for every day of the 2022 season and then subsequently winning the Korean Series. This was the first time ever a baseball team has completed a wire-to-wire season in Korea.

== Basketball ==
Per the Elias Sports Bureau four National Basketball Association teams have completed wire-to-wire victories to clinch an NBA title since 1970: the 1982 Los Angeles Lakers, the 1986 Boston Celtics, the 2020 Lakers, and the 2024 Celtics.

== Golf ==
The term is used in golf referencing a player who wins a title while holding the lowest aggregate score at the close of each round. The Masters Tournament has only had six winners complete a wire-to-wire tournament, those players being Craig Wood in 1941, Arnold Palmer in 1960, Jack Nicklaus in 1972, Raymond Floyd in 1976, Jordan Spieth in 2015, and Rory McIlroy in 2026.

== College football ==
In 1999, Florida State was the first FBS football program in the AP Poll era (1950–present) to start and finish the season as the number one ranked team every week of that season.

In 2004, USC was the wire-to-wire AP poll No. 1. The 2005 Orange Bowl was the first bowl game matchup of wire-to-wire No. 1 vs. wire-to-wire No. 2 (Oklahoma dropped to No. 3 in the final post-bowl poll after their loss.)

== Horse racing ==
Since 1875, the Kentucky Derby has only had 23 winners complete a wire-to-wire run with Authentic completing this feat in 2020.
