= Jack Nicklaus =

American professional golfer (born 1940)

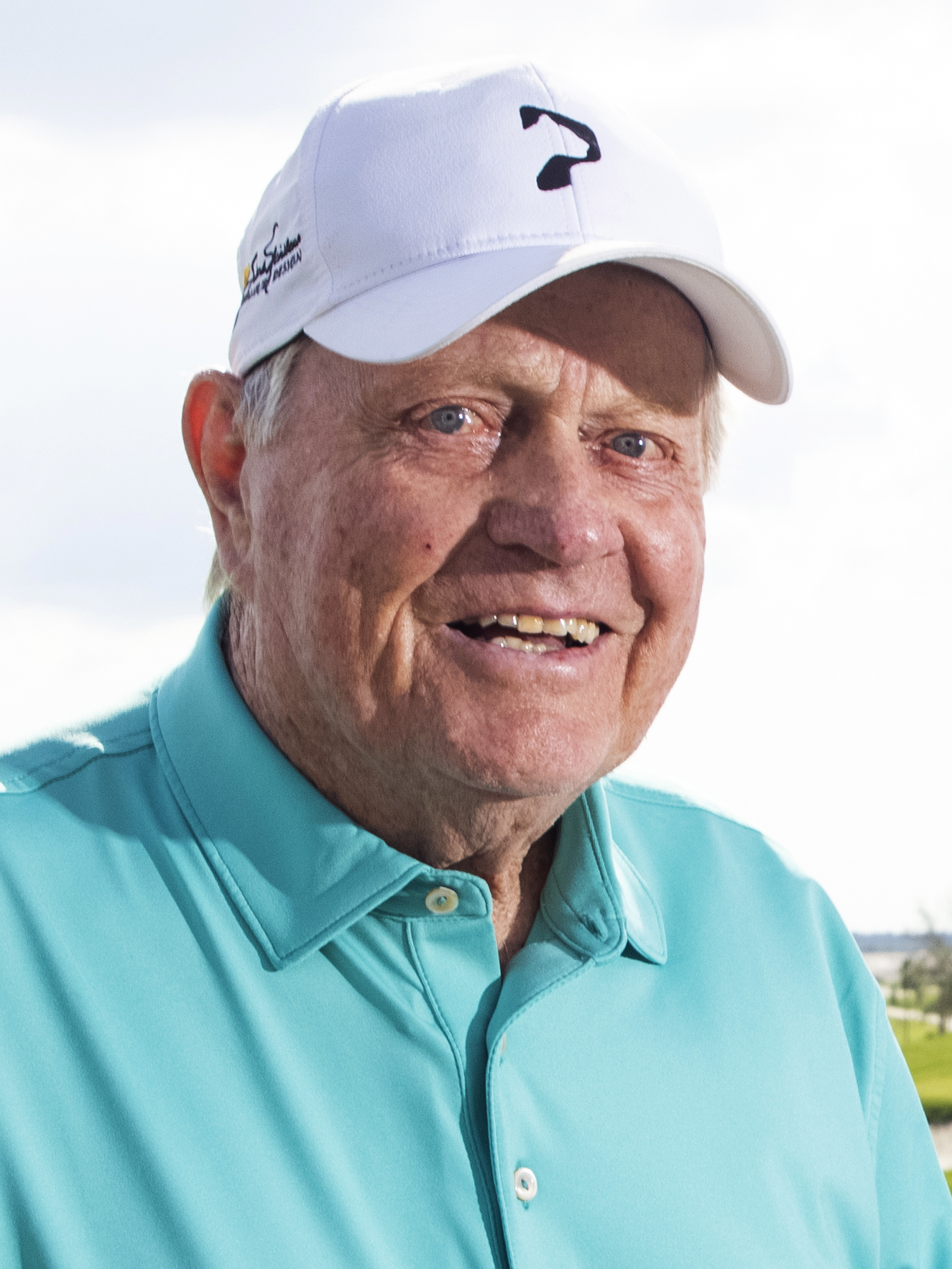
- Nicklaus in 2022

Personal information
- Full name: Jack William Nicklaus
- Nickname: The Golden Bear
- Nationality: United States
- Born: January 21, 1940 (age 86) Columbus, Ohio, U.S.
- Height: 5 ft 10 in (178 cm)
- Spouse: Barbara Bash (m. 1960)
- Children: 5, including Gary

Career
- Sport: Golf
- College: Ohio State University
- Turned professional: 1961
- Former tours: PGA Tour; Champions Tour
- Professional wins: 117

Number of wins by tour
- PGA Tour: 73 (3rd all-time)
- European Tour: 9
- PGA Tour of Australasia: 3
- PGA Tour Champions: 10
- Other: 24 (regular); 7 (senior)

Best results in major championships (wins: 18 (1st all-time))
- Masters Tournament: Won: 1963, 1965, 1966, 1972, 1975, 1986
- PGA Championship: Won: 1963, 1971, 1973, 1975, 1980
- U.S. Open: Won: 1962, 1967, 1972, 1980
- The Open Championship: Won: 1966, 1970, 1978

Achievements and awards
- World Golf Hall of Fame: 1974 (member page)
- PGA Tour money list winner: 1964, 1965, 1967, 1971, 1972, 1973, 1975, 1976
- PGA Player of the Year: 1967, 1972, 1973, 1975, 1976
- Bob Jones Award: 1975
- Payne Stewart Award: 2000
- Presidential Medal of Freedom: 2005
- PGA Tour Lifetime Achievement Award: 2008
- Congressional Gold Medal: 2015
- (For a full list of awards, see here)

Jack William Nicklaus (/ˈnɪkləsˌ ˈnɪkəl-/; born January 21, 1940), nicknamed "the Golden Bear", is an American retired professional golfer and golf course designer. He is widely considered to be one of the greatest golfers of all time. He won 117 professional tournaments in his career, including a record 18 major championships. He is an inductee of the World Golf Hall of Fame.

Nicklaus won the U.S. Amateur in 1959 and 1961 and finished second in the 1960 U.S. Open, two shots behind Arnold Palmer. Nicklaus turned professional in 1961 at age 21. He won his first professional victory at the 1962 U.S. Open, defeating Palmer by three shots in an 18-hole playoff beginning a long-running rivalry between the two. Nicklaus, Palmer, and Gary Player became known as “The Big Three,” a name given to the trio due to growing popularization of golf in the 1960s. In 1966, Nicklaus became the first player to win the Masters Tournament in back-to-back years; he also won the 1963 PGA Championship and the 1966 Open Championship, becoming at age 26 the youngest player at the time to complete the career grand slam.

Named the AP Athlete of the Decade for the 1970s, Nicklaus had won 17 major championships by 1980. He overtook Bobby Jones's record of 13 majors, and became the first player to complete double and triple career grand slams. At age 46, Nicklaus won his final major championship at the 1986 Masters Tournament, which was a record sixth Masters title. He joined the Senior PGA Tour (now known as the PGA Tour Champions) when he became eligible in 1990, and by 1996 had won 10 tournaments, including eight senior major championships, despite playing a limited schedule. He continued to play at least some of the four regular majors until making his final appearance at the 2005 Open Championship held at the Old Course at St Andrews.

As of 2026, Nicklaus heads Nicklaus Design, one of the world's largest golf course design and construction companies. He runs an event on the PGA Tour, the Memorial Tournament, which is held at the Nicklaus-designed Muirfield Village Golf Club, and is the subject of the Jack Nicklaus Museum on the campus of his alma mater, Ohio State University. Nicklaus's books vary from instructional to autobiographical, with his Golf My Way considered one of the best instructional golf books of all time; the video of the same name is the best-selling golf instructional to date. Nicklaus won the Ryder Cup with the United States five times as a player, he also captained the team in 1983 and 1987. He received the Presidential Medal of Freedom in 2005 and the Congressional Gold Medal in 2015.

== Early life and amateur golf career ==
Nicklaus was born on January 21, 1940, in Columbus, Ohio, and grew up in the suburb of Upper Arlington. He is of German descent, the son of Helen (Schoener) and Charlie Nicklaus, a pharmacist who ran several businesses named Nicklaus Drug Store. Charlie was a skilled all-round athlete who had played football for the Ohio State Buckeyes and had gone on to play semi-professional football under an assumed name for the Portsmouth Spartans (who later became the NFL's Detroit Lions). Charlie had also been a scratch golfer and local tennis champion in his youth. In February 1970, Charlie Nicklaus died of pancreatic cancer at age fifty-six.

Nicklaus attended Upper Arlington High School, whose nickname and mascot are coincidentally the Golden Bears. In Nicklaus's senior year, he was an honorable mention All-Ohio selection in basketball as a shooting guard, and he received some recruiting interest from college basketball programs, including Ohio State. During his youth, he also competed successfully in football, baseball, tennis, and track and field.

Nicklaus took up golf at the age of 10, scoring a 51 at Scioto Country Club for his first nine holes ever played. Charlie Nicklaus had joined Scioto that same year, returning to golf to help heal a volleyball injury. He was coached at Scioto by club pro Jack Grout, a Texas-developed contemporary of golf greats Byron Nelson and Ben Hogan; Grout had played quite successfully on the PGA Tour and would become Nicklaus's lifelong golf instructor. Nicklaus overcame a mild case of polio as a 13-year-old.

Nicklaus won the first of five straight Ohio State Junior titles at the age of 12. At 13, he broke 70 at Scioto Country Club for the first time, and became that year's youngest qualifier into the U.S. Junior Amateur, where he survived three match-play rounds. He had earned a handicap of +3 at age 13, the lowest in the Columbus area. Nicklaus won the Tri-State High School Championship (Ohio/Kentucky/Indiana) at the age of 14 with a round of 68, and also recorded his first hole-in-one in tournament play the same year. At 15, Nicklaus shot a 66 at Scioto Country Club, which was the amateur course record, and qualified for his first U.S. Amateur. He won the Ohio Open in 1956 at age 16, highlighted by a phenomenal third round of 64, competing against professionals. In all, Nicklaus won 27 events in the Ohio area from age 10 to age 17.

In 1957, Nicklaus won the International Jaycee Junior Golf Tournament, having lost the previous year in a playoff. Nicklaus also competed in his first of 44 consecutive U.S. Opens that year, but missed the cut. In 1958 at age 18, he competed in his first PGA Tour event, the Rubber City Open, at Akron, Ohio, tying for 12th place after being just one out of the lead at the 36-hole mark, and made the cut in the U.S. Open, tying for 41st place. Nicklaus also won two Trans-Mississippi Amateurs – in 1958 at Prairie Dunes Country Club and 1959 at Woodhill Country Club, with final match victories of 9 & 8 and 3 & 2, respectively. Also in 1959, Nicklaus won the North and South Amateur at Pinehurst, North Carolina and competed in three additional PGA Tour events, with his best finish being another 12th place showing at the Buick Open.

While attending Ohio State, he won the U.S. Amateur twice (1959, 1961), and an NCAA Championship (1961). In the 1959 U.S. Amateur, Nicklaus defeated two-time winner and defending champion Charles Coe 1-up in the final 36-hole match when he birdied the 18th hole. This was significant not only because of Coe's proven ability as a player, but also because Nicklaus became the then-youngest champion in the modern era, second only to Robert A. Gardner, who won in 1909. In 1961, Nicklaus became the first player to win the individual title at the NCAA Championship and the U.S. Amateur in the same year. He was followed by Phil Mickelson (1990), Tiger Woods (1996), Ryan Moore (2004), and Bryson DeChambeau (2015). Nicklaus also won the NCAA Big Ten Conference Championship that year with a 72-hole aggregate of 283, while earlier claiming the Western Amateur in New Orleans. In his second and last U.S. Amateur win in 1961, Nicklaus convincingly defeated Dudley Wysong 8 & 6 at Pebble Beach in the 36-hole championship match. For the week, Nicklaus was 20 strokes under par, including 34 birdies and two eagles.

At the 1960 U.S. Open, twenty-year-old Nicklaus shot a two-under-par 282, finishing in second place two strokes behind winner Arnold Palmer. This score remained the lowest ever by an amateur in the U.S. Open, until Viktor Hovland beat the record in 2019. Nicklaus played the final 36 holes with Ben Hogan, who later remarked that he had just played 36 holes with a kid who should have won by 10 shots. During the final 36 holes, Nicklaus was two-under-par; he had shot every round of the tournament at or below par and was the only entrant to do so. Nicklaus had led by two shots with six holes to play. In 1960, Nicklaus also tied for 13th in the Masters Tournament. He tied for fourth in the 1961 U.S. Open, three shots behind champion Gene Littler, having played the final 54 holes one under par. Each of these three major championship finishes designated Nicklaus as low amateur. However, Nicklaus's one-under-par 287 tied for seventh in the 1961 Masters Tournament, and was second that year only to Charles Coe's low amateur placing, who tied for second with Arnold Palmer at seven-under-par 281, one shot behind champion Gary Player.

Nicklaus represented the United States against Great Britain and Ireland on winning Walker Cup teams in both 1959 and 1961, decisively winning both of his matches in each contest. On the 1959 trip to Britain, he also made his only attempt at the British Amateur, the world's oldest international amateur event, at Royal St George's Golf Club, losing 4 & 3 in the quarterfinal round to fellow-American, Bill Hyndman. He was also a member of the victorious U.S. team in the 1960 Eisenhower Trophy, where he won the unofficial individual title by 13 shots over teammate Deane Beman with a four-round score of 269 at Merion Golf Club. This record of 269 stood until Jon Rahm totaled 263 at the 2014 Eisenhower Trophy. For three straight years (1959–1961), Nicklaus was named the world's top amateur golfer by Golf Digest magazine.

=== College studies and marriage ===
Nicklaus attended Ohio State University from 1957 to 1961. He majored in pre-pharmacy and had good grades in his first three years; he intended to follow his father into pharmacy after graduation. As his amateur golf achievements mounted, Nicklaus changed his mind on his career path; he switched programs to study insurance. At that stage, he planned to remain an amateur golfer and earn his living by selling insurance. For a time, he worked in the insurance field while he also attended college. He married Barbara Bash (b. 1940), who was a nursing student at Ohio State, in July 1960, and their first of five children, Jack Jr., was born in September 1961. The following month, Nicklaus was intent on becoming the first amateur to win the Masters. In early November, he changed his mind and announced that he was turning professional in order to support his family. He wound up a few course hours short of graduating from college. In a goodwill gesture, Ohio State granted him an honorary doctorate in 1972.

== PGA Tour career ==
=== Professional breakthrough: 1962–1963 ===
Nicklaus officially turned professional in late 1961 and began his career on the PGA Tour the following year. He had previously debated the idea of remaining an amateur in order to further emulate his idol, Bobby Jones. However, Nicklaus realized that in order to be regarded as the best, he would have to compete more frequently against the best. Shortly after turning professional, Nicklaus's future agent, Mark McCormack, was interviewed by Melbourne Age writer Don Lawrence, who inquired about the American golf scene. When McCormack described Nicklaus, Lawrence referred to the "large, strong, and blond" player as "the Golden Bear", a nickname that would become synonymous with Nicklaus throughout his professional life. However, another possible origination of the name derives from the high school that Nicklaus attended in Upper Arlington, Ohio, which uses the mascot the Golden Bears for its sports teams. As mentioned above, Nicklaus played on several Golden Bears athletic teams, including captaining its 1956 state-champion golf squad, suggesting that McCormack may have adopted the name through Nicklaus's high school affiliation. Regardless, by 1963, the nickname had stuck.

Nicklaus won his first PGA tournament in his 17th start. He and Arnold Palmer were tied for the lead at 1962 U.S. Open at Oakmont after Rounds 3 and 4 were played on Saturday. Nicklaus won the Sunday 18-hole playoff and earned $17,500 ($15,000 plus the $2,500 playoff bonus)—far behind Gary Woodland's $2,250,000 check for the 2019 U.S. Open—for his efforts. The galleries were more vocal in their support for Palmer—who had grown up in nearby Latrobe—but Nicklaus won the playoff by three shots (71 to 74). In 90 holes, Nicklaus had only one three-putt green. The U.S. Open victory made Nicklaus the reigning U.S. Open and U.S. Amateur champion. This major championship win was also his first PGA Tour win. In addition, Nicklaus (22) was the youngest U.S. Open champion since Bobby Jones won at age 21 in 1923, and remained the youngest winner until Jordan Spieth won the 2015 U.S. Open at age 21. (John McDermott is still the youngest winner of the U.S. Open at age 19 in 1911). The U.S. Open win thrust Nicklaus into the national spotlight, and he was featured on the cover of Time magazine. This was also the beginning of the Nicklaus-Palmer rivalry, which attracted viewers to golf on television.

By the end of 1962, Nicklaus had won two more tournaments, which were back-to-back in the Seattle Open and Portland Open. In addition, he tied for third in his first appearance in the PGA Championship. Nicklaus completed the year with over $60,000 (equivalent to $638,614 in 2025) in prize money, made 26 of 26 cuts with 16 top-10 finishes, placed third on the PGA Tour money list, and was named Rookie of the Year. He also won the inaugural staging of the World Series of Golf, a select-field event for the year's major champions, and collected another $50,000 (equivalent to $532,178 in 2025) in unofficial money for that win.

In 1963, Nicklaus won two of the four majors—the Masters and the PGA Championship. These victories made him the then-youngest winner of the Masters and third-youngest winner of the PGA Championship, and each win came in just his second year as a professional. Along with three other wins including the Tournament of Champions, he placed second to Arnold Palmer on the PGA Tour money list with just over $100,000 (equivalent to $1,051,630 in 2025). He also teamed with Palmer to win the Canada Cup (now the World Cup of Golf) in France, representing the United States (this event was shortened to 63 holes due to heavy fog). Nicklaus also finished as low individual scorer for that event.

==== Business success ====
Nicklaus's meteoric rise to fame immediately after turning professional enabled opportunities for him to earn significant endorsement income. These business opportunities were facilitated by Mark McCormack, who also managed Palmer and Gary Player. Golf was growing rapidly in popularity and media coverage during the early 1960s, led by the performances of these three star players. This association was the start of the agency that became known as International Management Group, and IMG, after building a base in golf management, eventually expanded into other sports. The Palmer-Nicklaus-Player rivalry developed into the so-called "Big Three" of Golf. In the early 1960s, McCormack set up a series of televised golf matches around the world among the three stars, known as Big Three Golf. In the early 1970s, Nicklaus left IMG to set up his own management agency, Golden Bear Inc. Nicklaus also signed a contract with Eastern Airlines. He could be seen on TV saying, "If you play golf, Eastern is your airline."

=== Continued excellence: 1964–1967 ===
Despite winning no majors in 1964 (he had three runner-up finishes), Nicklaus led the PGA Tour money list for the first time in his career by a slim margin of $81.13 over Palmer. At The Open Championship at St Andrews, Nicklaus set a new record for the lowest score in the final 36 holes with 66–68 in high winds (the first time in the championship's history that 70 had been broken in each of the last two rounds). This was not enough, however, to win the event; Nicklaus placed second to Tony Lema. Nicklaus also set a record for the lowest final-round score in the PGA Championship with a 64 (since broken by Brad Faxon in 1995 with a 63), but fell three shots short of champion Bobby Nichols and his record-setting score of 271. In 31 official worldwide events in 1964, Nicklaus achieved six victories, seven runners-up, placed in the top five 21 times, the top-10 21 times, and had only one missed cut. Nicklaus and Palmer also defended their team title at the World Cup in Hawaii, with Nicklaus again finishing as low individual scorer.

When Nicklaus won the Masters Tournament in 1965 and 1966, he became the tournament's first back-to-back winner and the youngest two-time and three-time winner. He broke Ben Hogan's 72-hole scoring record of 274 in 1953 when he compiled a new aggregate of 271 in the 1965 Masters. This record was tied by Raymond Floyd in 1976 and lasted until Tiger Woods shot 270 in 1997, which was a 72-hole record that was subsequently tied by Jordan Spieth in 2015. When Woods and Spieth shot 270, the scores were achieved with significantly improved golf equipment on essentially the same-length golf course over which Nicklaus and Floyd shot 271. During the 1965 tournament, Nicklaus hit 62 of 72 greens in regulation and had 123 putts, inclusive of just one three-putt green. This was good enough to win by nine shots over Arnold Palmer and Gary Player; this margin of victory was a tournament record that would last for 32 years until Woods won by 12 shots in 1997. The week's performance was highlighted by a third-round 64 that consisted of eight birdies and no bogeys. It was of this round that Nicklaus said, "I had never before and have never since played quite as fine a complete round of golf in a major championship as I did in the third round of the 1965 Masters." This round tied Lloyd Mangrum's record set at Augusta National in 1940 and remained in place until Nick Price shot 63 during the third round in 1986. It was at this time that Bobby Jones stated Nicklaus played a game with which he was unfamiliar; Jones called Nicklaus's result "the greatest performance in all of golfing history".

After Nicklaus's record performance at Augusta National in 1965, the course underwent some minor changes to make it tougher. These modifications and the difficult weather in the 1966 tournament did not deter Nicklaus. He successfully defended his title with an even-par aggregate of 288, 17 shots higher. He won in an 18-hole playoff over Gay Brewer (Brewer had three-putted the 18th green to force the playoff but he redeemed himself the following year by winning the tournament) and Tommy Jacobs by shooting a two-under-par 70. Nicklaus led the PGA Tour money list again in 1965 by a healthy margin over Tony Lema. Nicklaus and Lema formed the U.S. team for the World Cup, held in Madrid, Spain, but could not defend the title, as South Africa won. In all, Nicklaus competed in 28 official worldwide events in 1965, accumulating five victories, seven runners-up, 19 top-5 finishes, 23 top-10 finishes, and zero missed cuts.

In 1966, Nicklaus also won The Open Championship at Muirfield in Scotland under difficult weather conditions; he used his driver just 17 times because of very heavy rough. This was the only major he had failed to win up to that point. This win made him the youngest player, age 26 (his fifth year on Tour), and the only one after Gene Sarazen, Ben Hogan, and Gary Player (until Tiger Woods at age 24 in 2000, also during his fifth year on Tour, and Rory McIlroy in 2025), to win all four major championships, now known as the Career Grand Slam. Nicklaus eventually accomplished the double career grand slam in 1971 and the triple career grand slam in 1978, winning all four majors two and three times, respectively. Nicklaus was part of another title for the U.S. in the World Cup in Japan. Nicklaus concluded 1966 playing 22 official worldwide events, with four victories, four runners-up, 14 top-5 finishes, 16 top-10 finishes, and zero missed cuts.

In 1967, Nicklaus won the U.S. Open for a second time. The tournament was held at Baltusrol, and he broke Hogan's 72-hole record by one shot with a 275 when he birdied the par 5 18th hole. During the four rounds, Nicklaus hit 61 of 72 greens in regulation. Nicklaus finished this record win with a dramatic 238-yard 1-iron shot, uphill into a breeze and light rain, to the 72nd green (an approximate 260-yard equivalent) and holing out a 22-foot (6.7 m) birdie putt to close out a final nine of 30 and final round of 65 to shoot 275, four shots better than runner-up Arnold Palmer. Nicklaus and Palmer were the only two players to break par for the week. Sports Illustrated ran a cover photo of Nicklaus throwing his leg high in the air with the headline, "Nicklaus Breaks the Open Record". He also finished runner up in The Open Championship and third in the PGA Championship, one shot out of a playoff between Don January and Don Massengale. In 1967, Nicklaus led the PGA Tour money list for the third time. Later that year, Nicklaus and Palmer teamed up for a 13-shot wire-to-wire World Cup victory in Mexico City. Nicklaus competed in 24 official worldwide events in 1967, with five victories, four runners-up, 14 top-5 finishes, 16 top-10 finishes, and one missed cut. For most of his professional career, Nicklaus employed Angelo Argea as his caddie.

=== Career downturn (1968–1970) ===
After Nicklaus won the 1967 U.S. Open in record-breaking fashion, he did not win another major championship until the 1970 Open Championship at the Old Course at St Andrews. Moreover, his highest finish on the Tour money list for the years 1968–70 was second; his lowest was fourth, his worst ranking on the list since turning professional. However, his fourth-place ranking in 1970 would have been elevated to second if The Open Championship winnings were included during that period in the official PGA Tour money list, as they are today. Nicklaus finished runner-up in both the 1968 U.S. Open (to new rival Lee Trevino) and the 1968 Open Championship (to old rival Gary Player).

Nicklaus made his inaugural appearance in the 1969 Ryder Cup at age 29; eligibility rules at the time required a minimum five-year PGA Tour membership before points could be counted for team qualification; rules have been relaxed significantly since. In the 1969 Ryder Cup, the entire competition came down to the anchor singles match between Nicklaus and Tony Jacklin. At the par-5 17th hole with Nicklaus leading by the score of 1 up, Jacklin made a 35-foot (11 m) eagle putt to square the match. With the entire competition outcome riding on this match, Nicklaus made a five-foot par putt on the last hole before controversially conceding Jacklin's par putt, ensuring that this game, and the overall match, ended in a tie. Afterwards United States team Captain Sam Snead said "This is the greatest golf match you have ever seen in England."

During this period, Nicklaus's physical condition declined somewhat; he put on some excess weight, which affected his stamina. Following the Ryder Cup, he significantly improved his condition in the fall of 1969 by losing 25 pounds (11 kg) in one month, and his game started to return to top form. In February 1970, Nicklaus's father, Charlie Nicklaus, died of pancreatic cancer at age 56. Five months after this, Nicklaus won the 1970 Open Championship under difficult scoring conditions in Scotland where the wind howled up to 56 miles per hour (90 km/h), defeating fellow American Doug Sanders in an 18-hole playoff round in emotional fashion. On the 18th hole of the playoff, Nicklaus drove about 380 yards, through the par-4 green with a three-wood, and was forced to pitch back to the hole. His eagle pitch finished approximately eight feet short of the hole. Nicklaus threw his putter into the air after sinking the winning putt, as he was thrilled to have won the Open at the home of golf, St Andrews. He describes this period in his life:

I was playing good golf, but it really wasn't that big a deal to me one way or the other. And then my father died and I sort of realized that he had certainly lived his life through my golf game. I really hadn't probably given him the best of that. So I sort of got myself back to work. So '70 was an emotional one for me from that standpoint. ... It was a big boost.

Nicklaus also went on to capture the Piccadilly World Match Play Championship in 1970 with a 2 & 1 win over Lee Trevino in the championship match. In all for the year, Nicklaus competed in 23 official worldwide events, won four, placed in the top-5 10 times, and the top-10 in 14.

Although Nicklaus's performance had declined somewhat during this period, he was still ranked as the No. 1 player in the world, for 10 straight years, beginning in 1968, on the McCormack's World Golf Rankings, which were introduced that year by sports agent Mark McCormack. These rankings, the first attempt to take into account results from professional tours around the world, were not official during that era, but they eventually evolved into the current Official World Golf Ranking, starting in 1986.

=== Resurgence (1971–1977) ===
With his victory in the 1971 PGA Championship, Nicklaus became the first golfer to win all four majors twice. In this championship, Nicklaus was the only player to break 70 consecutively in the first two rounds under windy conditions; he finished at seven-under-par 281. Nicklaus finished second twice and fifth in the remaining three major championships for the year. While he finished tied for second in the Masters with Johnny Miller, Nicklaus made a big enough impression on a young Nick Faldo (watching on TV in England) in order for Faldo to take up the game seriously.

By the end of 1971, Nicklaus had won four additional PGA tournaments including the Tournament of Champions by eight shots and the National Team Championship with Arnold Palmer by six shots. With $244,490 in official PGA Tour earnings, Nicklaus established a new single-season money record during the year. Nicklaus also claimed his third World Cup individual title in 1971, with help from a 63 in the third round. He also won the team competition with partner Lee Trevino by 12 shots. The year 1971 brought Nicklaus a victory in the Australian Dunlop International as well, punctuated by a course record 62 (his career-low score in competition; one of three) in the second round. For the record, Nicklaus played in 23 official worldwide events in 1971, won eight, had 17 top-5 finishes, 20 top-10 finishes, and compiled a 5–1–0 record in that year's Ryder Cup competition.

Nicklaus won the first two major championships of 1972 by three shots each in wire-to-wire fashion. He won the Masters and the U.S. Open, creating talk of a calendar-year Grand Slam. Nicklaus opened with a four-under-par 68 at Augusta National and never looked back. He was the only player under par for the week as he and the field battled difficult scoring conditions. In the U.S. Open at Pebble Beach again under severe scoring conditions, Nicklaus struck a one-iron on the 218-yard par-three 17th hole during the final round into a stiff, gusty ocean breeze that hit the flagstick and ended up three inches from the cup. The U.S. Open was Nicklaus's 13th career major and tied him with Bobby Jones for career majors (although a different group of tournaments had been considered majors in Jones's time). This victory was also Nicklaus's 11th professional major, tying him with Walter Hagen, and made him the first player to win the U.S. Amateur and U.S. Open championships on the same golf course.

During the 1972 PGA Tour season, Nicklaus won seven tournaments and was runner-up in three events. However, Nicklaus did not win the Grand Slam that year, as Lee Trevino repeated as the Open Championship winner (Nicklaus finished second, one shot behind), and Gary Player prevailed in the PGA Championship. Nicklaus closed out this remarkable year with a second of three consecutive Walt Disney World Golf Classic victories by shooting a 21-under-par 267 to win by nine shots. He concluded 1972 by competing in 20 official worldwide events winning seven, placing second in four, and compiling 15 top-10 finishes.

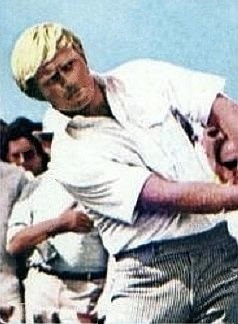
Nicklaus in 1973

Bobby Jones's record of majors was soon broken when Nicklaus won the PGA Championship in August 1973 by four shots over Bruce Crampton for his 12th professional major (surpassing Hagen's mark of 11) and 14th overall when using the old-style configuration of Jones's day. In that year he won another six tournaments. When he won the 1973 Ohio Kings Island Open, he became the first PGA Tour player to win a Tour event on a course that he designed himself. The PGA Player of the Year was awarded to Nicklaus for the third time, and the second year in a row. Nicklaus was also the first player to win over $300,000.00 in official money for a single season in 1972 at $320,542; he eclipsed that threshold again the following year with $308,362. The former total was $106,137 more than runner-up Lee Trevino. The latter total for the year 1973 catapulted Nicklaus over the $2 million career PGA Tour earnings mark, making him the first player to reach that milestone. Nicklaus teamed with Johnny Miller for another team title in the World Cup of Golf, held in Spain. For the year, Nicklaus competed in 20 official worldwide events and claimed seven victories, 14 top-five finishes, 17 top-10s, and compiled a 4–1–1 record in that year's Ryder Cup competition.

Nicklaus's failure to win a major in 1974 was somewhat offset when he won the inaugural Tournament Players Championship and was named one of the 13 original inductees into the World Golf Hall of Fame. Nicklaus said this honor was a "nice memento" after a "disappointing season". Although he had no major championship victories in 1974, Nicklaus still achieved four top-10 finishes in the four events, three of which were in the top four, and placed second on the official money list behind Johnny Miller. While less than a stellar year, Nicklaus was able to claim two victories and 13 top-10 finishes in 20 official worldwide events.

Nicklaus started off well in 1975: he won the Doral-Eastern Open, the Sea Pines Heritage Classic, and the Masters in consecutive starts. His Masters win was his fifth, a record he was to break eleven years later. In this tournament, Nicklaus's 40-foot (12 m) birdie putt on the 16th hole of the final round was a key in his victory over Tom Weiskopf and Johnny Miller in a riveting final-round battle. He also won the PGA Championship in August at Firestone Country Club by two shots over Bruce Crampton for his fourth win. Having won the Masters and PGA Championship, Nicklaus missed a playoff for the U.S. Open by two shots and a playoff for Open Championship by one shot. His performance in 1975 resulted in his being named PGA Player of the Year for the fourth time, tying Ben Hogan, and he was also named ABC's Wide World of Sports Athlete of the Year. Nicklaus also captured his fourth Australian Open during the year. The year 1975 yielded Nicklaus six wins, 12 top-5 finishes, and 16 top-10 finishes in 18 official worldwide events.

Nicklaus placed first on the PGA Tour money list again in 1976, despite competing in only 16 events, winning just two (Tournament Players Championship and World Series of Golf) – neither of them majors – and playing what he called "hang-back-and-hope golf". The 1976 Tournament Players Championship saw Nicklaus set a championship record of 19-under-par 269 for his second win in this event which remained in place until Greg Norman's 24-under-par 264 assault in 1994. He also won the PGA Player of the Year award for a record fifth time. Between 1972 and 1976 the only time he failed to win this award was 1974. The year 1976 also concluded an official streak of 105 consecutive cuts made on the PGA Tour (ending at the World Open), which began for Nicklaus in 1970. At the time this streak was second only to Byron Nelson's record of 113.

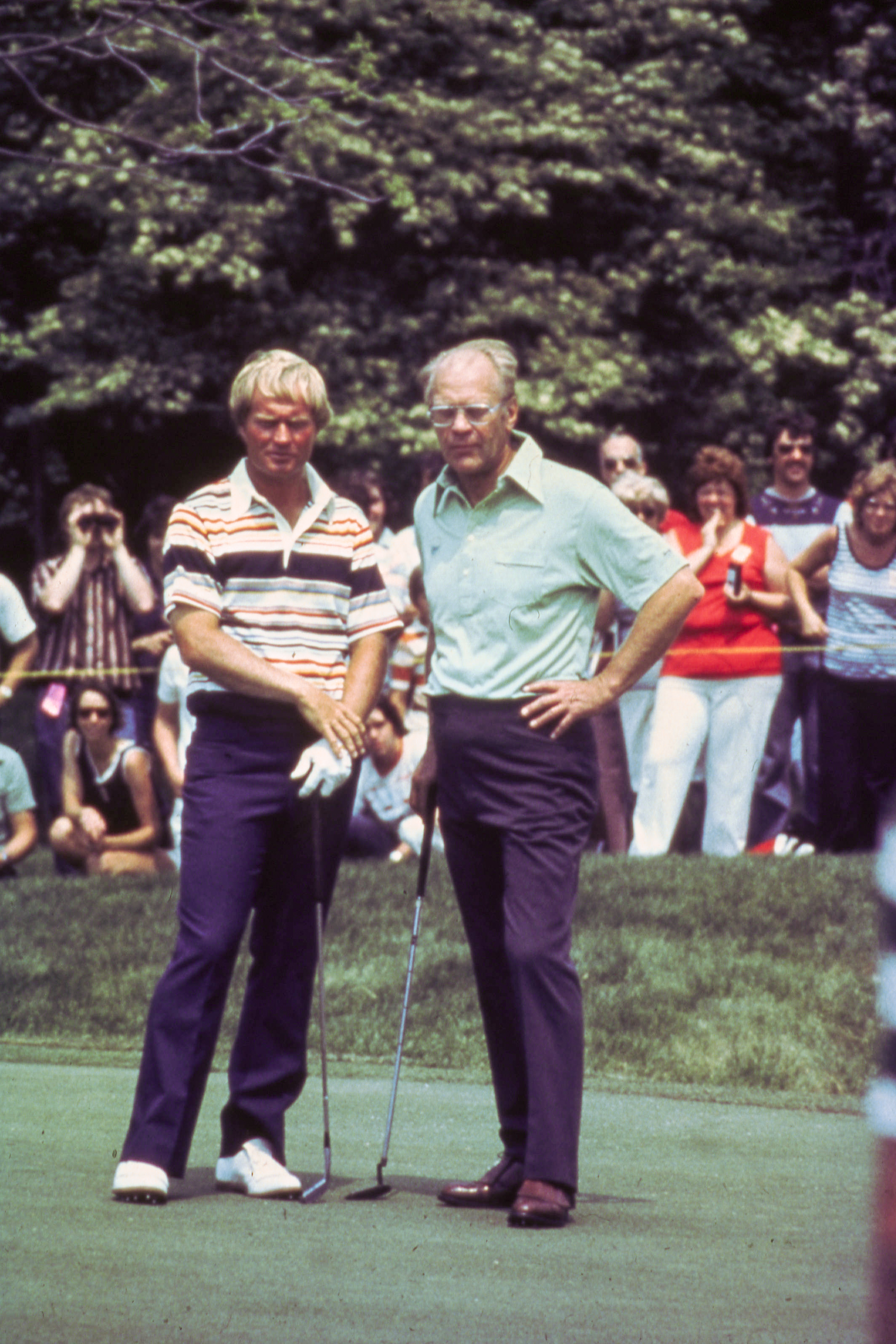
Jack Nicklaus and former President Gerald Ford at 1977 Memorial Tournament pro-am

The following year, 1977, was also majorless for Nicklaus, but he did achieve four top-10 finishes in the four events inclusive of two second and one third-place finish – this being one shot out of the PGA Championship playoff between Lanny Wadkins and Gene Littler. Despite a brilliant final round 66 at the Masters, he finished second by two shots to Tom Watson. But his subsequent second-place finish behind Watson at the Open Championship at Turnberry created headlines around the world. In a one-on-one battle dubbed the "Duel in the Sun", Nicklaus shot 65–66 in the final two rounds, only to be beaten by Watson, who scored 65-65. This event marked the first time 270 was broken in a major championship, and the third-place finisher Hubert Green scored 279. Nicklaus would later say:

There are those in golf who would argue into next month that the final two rounds of the 1977 British Open were the greatest head-to-head golf match ever played. Not having been around for the first five hundred or so years of the game, I'm not qualified to speak on such matters. What's for sure, however, is that it was the most thrilling one-on-one battle of my career.

In 1977, Nicklaus won his 63rd tour event, passing Ben Hogan to take second place on the career wins list, behind only Sam Snead (subsequently Hogan's official career PGA Tour victory total was put at 64, including his 1953 Open Championship which was retroactively deemed an official PGA Tour event). He also became the first player to amass over $3 million in official PGA Tour earnings. The year also saw Nicklaus win for the first time his own Memorial Tournament, where he described the victory as the most emotional moment of his entire career, and nearly decided to retire from competitive golf.

==== Proposes Ryder Cup modifications ====
During the 1977 Ryder Cup at Royal Lytham & St Annes, Nicklaus approached the PGA of Great Britain about the urgency to improve the competitive level of the contest. The issue had been discussed earlier the same day by both past PGA of America President Henry Poe and British PGA President Lord Derby. Nicklaus pitched his ideas, adding: "It is vital to widen the selection procedures if the Ryder Cup is to continue to enjoy its past prestige." The changes in team selection procedure were approved by descendants of the Samuel Ryder family, along with The PGA of America. The major change was expanding selection procedures to include players from the European Tournament Players' Division, and "that European Members be entitled to play on the team". This meant that professional players on the European Tournament Players' Division, the forerunner to the European Tour we have today, from continental Europe would be eligible to play in the Ryder Cup.

==== Achieves triple career grand slam (1978) ====
When Nicklaus won the 1978 Open Championship at St. Andrews, he became the only player to win each major championship three times. This record was tied by Tiger Woods when he won the 2008 U.S. Open. Nicklaus and Woods are the only two players to win three "Career Grand Slams". Nicklaus considered his performance in the 1978 Open as the finest four days of tee-to-green golf he had ever produced, and was most proud that the win came at St. Andrews, his favorite place to play golf. The victory was also his most emotional to date.

Nicklaus won three other tournaments on the PGA Tour in 1978. One of those wins came in the Jackie Gleason-Inverrary Classic, where he played the final 36 holes 13 under par and scored five consecutive birdies over the closing holes in the final round. He also won his third Tournament Players Championship in difficult weather conditions; he had won three of the first five stagings of that tournament, and he remains the championship's only three-time winner. He was named Sportsman of the Year by Sports Illustrated. The year 1978 also marked Nicklaus's sixth and final Australian Open victory.

=== Short slump and revamping ===
In 1979, Nicklaus suffered a lapse of form and did not win a tournament. This was the first year in his professional career in which he failed to win a PGA Tour event. He did, however, come close. Playing well ahead of the last group on a windy day in the final round of the 1979 Masters he was 8-under through 16 holes but bogeyed 17 and parred 18 to finish 7-under. The ensuing 3-man playoff between Ed Sneed, Tom Watson and Fuzzy Zoeller (who won the playoff) took place at 8-under after Sneed bogeyed the last three. Jack also finished in a tie for second with Ben Crenshaw behind 22-year-old Seve Ballesteros at The Open Championship. He would not win another tournament until June 1980. Previously, Nicklaus won at least one PGA Tour tournament per year (a record he shares with Arnold Palmer), and a minimum of two tournaments per year for 17 consecutive years, and this is another PGA Tour record.

During the offseason, Nicklaus addressed two problems that had hurt his performance. His lifelong teacher Jack Grout noticed that he had become much too upright with his full swing, which caused a steep, oblique approach into the ball, compared with a more direct hit; this was corrected by slightly flattening his backswing. Then Nicklaus's short game, never a career strength, was further developed with the help of Phil Rodgers, a friend for more than 20 years, and earlier PGA Tour rival, who had become a fine coach. Rodgers lived for a time at the Nicklaus home while this work was going on.

=== Wins fourth U.S. Open, fifth PGA Championship (1980) ===
In 1980, Nicklaus recorded only four top-10 finishes in 14 events, but two of these were record-setting victories in majors (the U.S. Open and the PGA Championship); the other two were a tie for fourth in The Open Championship and a runner-up finish in the Doral-Eastern Open to Raymond Floyd via his chip-in birdie on the second hole of a sudden-death playoff.

Nicklaus set a new scoring record for the 1980 U.S. Open with an aggregate of 272, eclipsing his earlier record of 275 from 1967 over the same golf course. That record, while since having been tied by three other players, stood until Rory McIlroy's 268 in winning the 2011 U.S. Open. This was Nicklaus's second major win at Baltusrol Golf Club. Nicklaus opened with a record-tying 63 in round one and fought off his playing partner of all four rounds, 1978 Colgate World Match Play Championship winner, Isao Aoki. Entering the final round, Aoki had caught Nicklaus after three consecutive rounds of 68, but over the course of the last day, Nicklaus pulled away by two shots. Each player birdied the final two holes for a dramatic finish. Aoki's aggregate of 274 was the lowest score for a U.S. Open runner-up. Nicklaus's win was his fourth and final victory in the championship, tying him with Willie Anderson, Bobby Jones, and Ben Hogan. Nicklaus referred to this win as "by far the most emotional and warmest reaction to any of my wins in my own country".

In the 1980 PGA Championship, Nicklaus set another record when he won the tournament by seven shots over Andy Bean at the Oak Hill Country Club; the win was largely due to exceptional putting. Nicklaus shot an even-par 70 in the first round. This was followed by three successive rounds in the 60s over the difficult course, and he was the only player to break par for 72 holes. For the week, the field averaged 74.60 strokes while Nicklaus averaged 68.50. This was Nicklaus's fifth and final victory in the PGA Championship, which elevated him to record-holder for the most wins in the stroke-play era, and which tied him with Walter Hagen for the most wins overall, since Hagen's victories were all during the match-play era. Nicklaus's seven-shot winning margin remained the largest for the stroke-play version of the championship until Rory McIlroy's 2012 victory. This victory also made Nicklaus the only player since Gene Sarazen in 1922 and Ben Hogan in 1948 to win the U.S. Open and PGA Championship the same year (subsequently equaled by Tiger Woods in 2000 and Brooks Koepka in 2018).

=== 1981–1985 ===
Between 1981 and 1985, Nicklaus accumulated seven more top-10 placements in major championships, including three runner-up performances. He won only twice on the PGA Tour during this period, the Colonial National Invitation in 1982 and his own Memorial Tournament in 1984 for the second time, defeating Andy Bean in a sudden-death playoff to become the tournament's first two-time champion.

In 1983, Nicklaus closed out the PGA Championship and World Series of Golf with brilliant final rounds in the mid-60s, and passed many players to move into contention, but finished runner-up in each to Player of the Year Hal Sutton and Nick Price, respectively, who dominated the tournaments from start to finish. Despite not winning a PGA Tour event in 1983, Nicklaus finished 10th on the PGA Tour money list, and passed a significant milestone by becoming the first player to eclipse the $4 million level in career earnings.

In 1985, Nicklaus finished second to Curtis Strange in the Canadian Open, which marked his seventh and final second-place finish in that tournament; this is a record for that event. These seven runner-up finishes came over the course of 21 events—or one second-place finish for every three tournaments played—and does not include a third-place finish in 1983, one shot out of the playoff between John Cook and Johnny Miller.

During the five-year period between 1981 and 1985, the Ryder Cup matches provided Nicklaus with two bright spots. He completed his competition as a player in style by contributing a perfect 4–0–0 record (inclusive of a 5 & 3 anchor singles match win over Eamonn Darcy) in 1981, and captained the United States team in 1983 to a one-point win over Europe.

=== Wins sixth Masters at age 46 (1986) ===
In 1986, Nicklaus capped his victories in major championships by winning his sixth Masters title under challenging circumstances; he posted a six-under-par 30 on the back nine for a final round of seven-under-par 65. At the 17th hole, Nicklaus hit his second shot to within 18 feet (5.5 m) and rolled it in for birdie; he raised his putter in celebration and completed an eagle-birdie-birdie run. Nicklaus made a solid par-4 at the 72nd hole, and waited for the succeeding players, several of whom (Tom Kite, Greg Norman) were still in contention, to fall short. Nicklaus played the final ten holes seven under par, with six birdies and an eagle. At age 46, Nicklaus became the oldest Masters winner in history, a record that still stands. On the feat, sports columnist Thomas Boswell remarked,

Some things cannot possibly happen, because they are both too improbable and too perfect. The U.S. hockey team cannot beat the Russians in the 1980 Olympics. Jack Nicklaus cannot shoot 65 to win The Masters at age 46. Nothing else comes immediately to mind.

This victory was his 18th and final major title.

This victory was to be his last in his long career on the PGA Tour, and was described at the time by noted golf historian and writer Herbert Warren Wind as "nothing less than the most important accomplishment in golf since Bobby Jones's Grand Slam in 1930".

Author Ken Bowden wrote after the win:

There have been prettier swingers of the club than Jack Nicklaus. There may have been better ball-strikers than Jack Nicklaus. There have definitely been better short-game exponents than Jack Nicklaus. Other golfers have putted as well as Jack Nicklaus. There may have been golfers as dedicated and fiercely competitive as Jack Nicklaus. But no individual has been able to develop, combine and sustain all of the complex physical skills and the immense mental and emotional resources the game demands at its highest level as well as Jack Nicklaus has for as long as he has.

At the 1998 Masters, Nicklaus was 58 when he tied for sixth place despite being hampered by an increasingly painful left hip. Nicklaus's five-under-par 283 was the lowest 72-hole score in the Masters by a player older than fifty, until Phil Mickelson finished eight-under-par 280 in 2023 at age 52.

During the course of a 25-year span (1962–1986), Nicklaus won 18 major championships and finished second 18 times (excluding the second-place finish at the 1960 U.S. Open as an amateur). He also placed third nine times and fourth seven times in this span and was one stroke out of a playoff on five of those occasions (1963 Open Championship, 1967 PGA Championship, 1975 Open Championship, 1977 PGA Championship, and 1979 Masters Tournament). His total span of 73 top-10 finishes over 39 years (1960–1998) is a record in total number as well as longevity among the four major championships and encompassed his tenure from an amateur through the majority of his Champions Tour career.

== Senior golf career ==
Nicklaus became eligible to join the Senior PGA Tour, now known as PGA Tour Champions, when he turned 50 in January 1990, at which point he declared, "I'm never satisfied. Trouble is, I want to play like me—and I can't play like me anymore." He then quickly won in his first start on the Tour, The Tradition, also a Senior Tour major championship. Nicklaus would go on to win another three Traditions—the final two in succession—while the most anyone else has won is two.

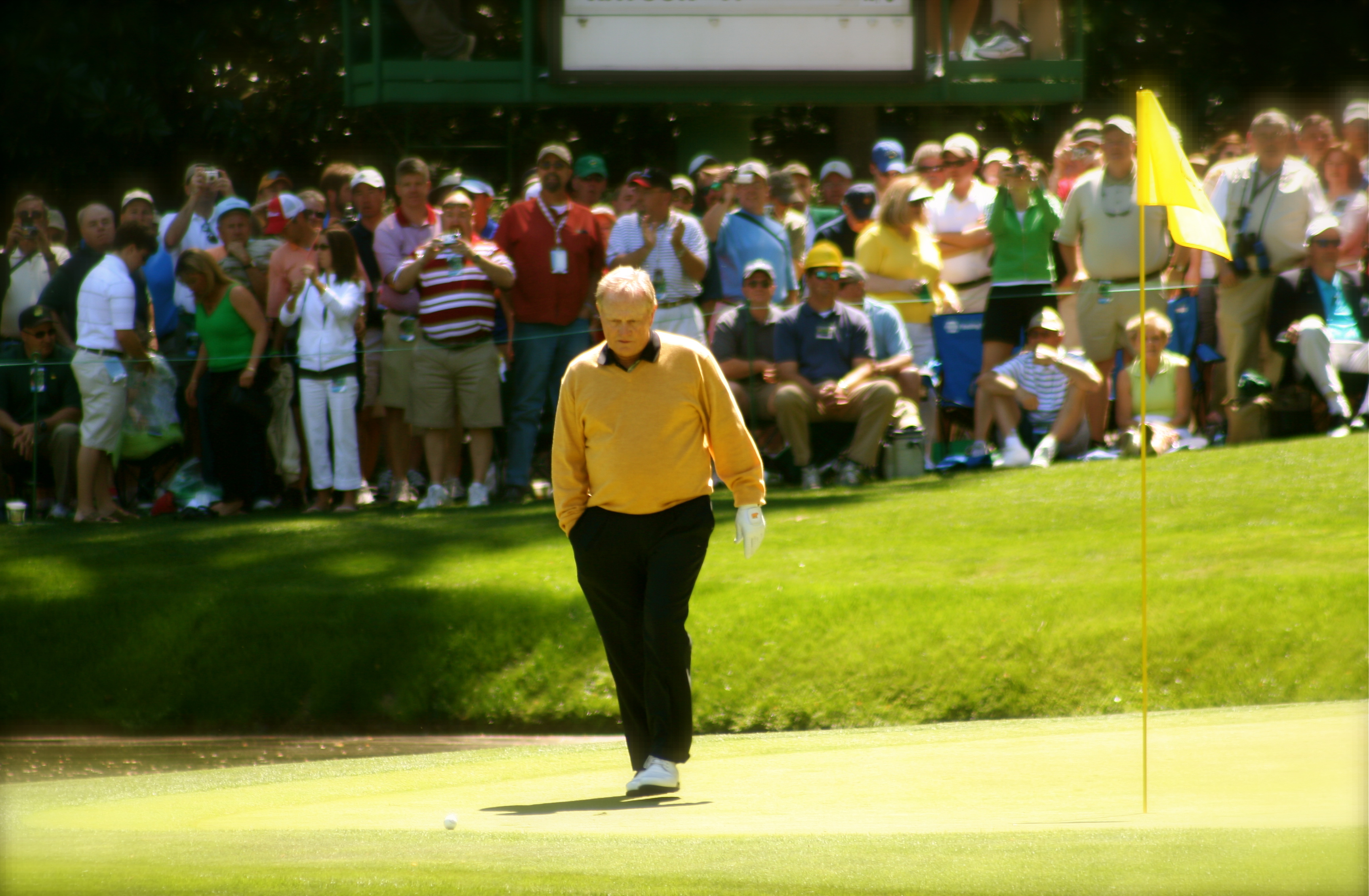
Nicklaus walks up to his ball on the 9th hole of the par-3 course at Augusta National Golf Club during the 2006 par-3 contest.

Later in the year, Nicklaus won the Senior Players Championship by six shots over Lee Trevino for his second win of the year, and also his second major of the year by shooting a record 27-under-par 261. The next year, in 1991, Nicklaus won three of the five events he started in, those being the U.S. Senior Open at Oakland Hills by firing a 65 in a playoff against Chi-Chi Rodríguez and his final round of 69, the PGA Seniors Championship and The Tradition for the second year straight. These, again, were all majors on the senior circuit.

Nicklaus has won all the senior majors with the exception of the Senior Open Championship. However, he never played in that event until after he turned 60, and it was only elevated to a major in 2003. After a winless year in 1992, Nicklaus came back to win the U.S. Senior Open for the second time in 1993 by one shot over Tom Weiskopf. Also in that year he teamed up with Chi-Chi Rodríguez and Raymond Floyd to win the Wendy's 3-Tour Challenge for the Senior PGA Tour team.

In 1994, Nicklaus won the Senior PGA Tour's version of the Mercedes Championship for his only win of the year. The Tradition was his again in 1995, in a year where he made the top 10 in all of the seven tournaments he entered in. His 100th career win came the next year, when he won the Tradition for the fourth time, and second time in succession. He made a double eagle in the final round. Nicklaus closed the final 36 holes with back-to-back seven-under-par rounds of 65 to shoot a 16-under-par 272 and win by three shots over Hale Irwin. This was to be his last win on the Senior PGA Tour, and the last official win of his career.

== Close of playing career ==
In 2000, Nicklaus played in his 44th and final U.S. Open. He shot 73-82 and missed the cut at Pebble Beach Golf Links. This was the same tournament where Tiger Woods won his first Open when he outclassed the nearest competitors by a 15-shot margin. During the tournament, after defending champion Payne Stewart had died in an airplane crash the previous October, Nicklaus was given Stewart's place in the traditional opening pairings alongside the Open Championship winner (Paul Lawrie) and the U.S. Amateur winner (David Gossett), and Nicklaus asked for a moment of silence in Stewart's honor before his opening tee shot.

Later in the year, he was paired with Woods and Vijay Singh in his final PGA Championship, where he missed the cut by one shot only a few days after the death of his 91-year-old mother. In both tournaments, Nicklaus provided last-minute heroics by reaching the par-5 18th in two shots in the U.S. Open and nearly holing his wedge shot for eagle at the par-5 18th in the PGA Championship.

Nicklaus played without much preparation in the 2005 Masters, which was a month after the drowning death of his 17-month-old grandson Jake (child of his son Steve) on March 1, 2005. In a written statement, Nicklaus said that it was impossible to put into words the devastation of his family. Nicklaus later spoke emotionally about the tragedy. He said: "It's been an overwhelmingly difficult and trying time for my entire family. The loss of our precious 17-month-old grandson Jake was devastating." Nicklaus and his son Steve played golf as therapy for their grief following Jake's death. After days of playing, Steve suggested his father return to The Masters. He made that his last appearance in the tournament.

Later in 2005, Nicklaus finished his professional career at The Open Championship played at St Andrews on July 15. On St Andrews, Nicklaus stated:

I'm very sentimental and the place gets to me every time I go there. In May I walked around and welled up with hardly anyone watching me. St Andrews was always where I wanted to finish my major career.

Nicklaus turned 65 in January that year, which was the last year he could enter The Open Championship as an exempt player. He played with Luke Donald and Tom Watson in his final round. After hitting his tee shot off the 18th tee in the second round, Nicklaus received a ten-minute standing ovation from the crowd. On the eighteenth fairway, he gave his final farewell to professional golf while standing on the iconic Swilcan Bridge. Soon afterwards, Nicklaus ended his career with a birdie, holing a 15-foot birdie putt on the 18th green. Nicklaus missed the 36-hole cut with a score of +3 (147).

The last competitive tournament in which Nicklaus played in the United States was the Champions Tour's Bayer Advantage Classic in Overland Park, Kansas, on June 13, 2005.

One of the most memorable moments in Nicklaus's career occurred well after his formal retirement from the sport. At the grand opening of a course Nicklaus designed, The Golf Club at Harbor Shores in Benton Harbor, Michigan, in July 2010, Nicklaus played alongside Arnold Palmer, Tom Watson, and Johnny Miller in the Harbor Shores Champions for Change Golf Challenge. Miller questioned how anybody could handle a particular severely uphill and sloping putt spanning the entire green. Nicklaus walked over from across the green, asking "Want me to show you how to putt it?" Miller replied, "Show me how to do it" as Nicklaus dropped a ball next to Miller's and casually hit the 102-foot putt, which curved uphill and across the green before dropping perfectly into the hole, eliciting cheers.

On April 8, 2015, Nicklaus hit his first-ever hole-in-one at the Augusta National Golf Club at the age of 75 when participating in the Masters' Par 3 Contest, albeit on the Par 3 Course, while playing with Gary Player and Ben Crenshaw. He hit 20 holes-in-one in professional tournament play at other venues over his career.

== Off-the-course activities ==
=== Golf course design ===
Nicklaus devotes much of his time to golf course design and operates one of the largest golf design practices in the world. In the mid-1960s, Pete Dye initially requested Nicklaus's opinion in the architecture process of The Golf Club in suburban Columbus, Ohio, and the input increased from that point forward. Nicklaus considered golf course design another facet of the game that kept him involved and offered a challenge. His first design, Harbour Town Golf Links, co-credited with Dye, was opened for play in 1969. The nine-hole, par-3 golf course of Cheeca Resort & Spa was also designed by Nicklaus in the 1960s. A subsequent early, yet more prominent design was Muirfield Village Golf Club in Dublin, OH which opened in 1974 and has hosted the Memorial Tournament since its inception in 1976. This course has also hosted the 1987 Ryder Cup, the 1998 Solheim Cup matches and the 2013 Presidents Cup. For the first few years, all of his projects were co-designs with either Pete Dye or Desmond Muirhead, who were two of the leading golf course architects of that era.

His first solo design, Glen Abbey Golf Course in Oakville, Ontario, opened for play in 1976. This course served as the host site for the Canadian Open for many years, the first being in 1977. The oldest golf club in the U.S., Saint Andrew's Golf Club in New York, was redesigned by Nicklaus in 1983. In 2000, the King & Bear opened in St. Augustine, Florida, as a joint collaboration between Nicklaus and Arnold Palmer. In 2006, The Concession Golf Club opened in Sarasota, Florida, as a joint collaboration between him and Tony Jacklin, to commemorate their historic Ryder Cup singles match in 1969.

Nicklaus is in partnership with his four sons and his son-in-law through their company, Nicklaus Design. The company had 299 courses open for play at the end of 2005, which was nearly 1% of all the courses in the world (in 2005, Golf Digest calculated that there were nearly 32,000 golf courses in the world, approximately half of them in the United States). While the majority of Nicklaus-designed courses are located in the United States, the company has designed golf courses in Asia, Australia, New Zealand, Canada, Europe, and Mexico. For 2009, Nicklaus Design had 12 courses in Golf Digest's "75 Best Golf Resorts in North America".

=== Writings and media ===
Nicklaus had a golf column in Sports Illustrated from 1965 until 1971, with Mark Mulvoy as a ghostwriter. Nicklaus has written several golf instructional books, an autobiography (My Story), a book on his golf course design methods and philosophy, and has produced several golf videos. The writer Ken Bowden often assisted him with this work. His book Golf My Way is one of the all-time classics of golf instruction, and has been reissued several times since the initial printing in 1974. Nicklaus has also written golf instructional columns for Golf Magazine and for Golf Digest magazine, with which he is currently associated. He also appeared as a television analyst and commentator with ABC Sports on golf broadcasts. Several of the books have been reissued, sometimes under different titles, and My Story as a special high-quality limited edition for the 2000 Memorial Tournament.

He appeared in Happy Gilmore 2 in 2026 too.

=== Golf computer games ===
Between 1988 and 1998, Nicklaus also gave his name to promote the successful Jack Nicklaus computer game series published by Accolade. Several of the golf courses he designed were incorporated into the series' various incarnations. In addition, Jack Nicklaus 6: Golden Bear Challenge by Activision was published in 1999.

=== Other interests ===
Nicklaus continues to manage the Memorial Tournament, which he founded in his home state of Ohio. The event is played at Muirfield Village, a course that he co-designed with Desmond Muirhead and opened in 1974. The course was officially dedicated on Memorial Day, May 27, 1974, with an exhibition match between Nicklaus and Tom Weiskopf. Nicklaus scored a six-under-par 66, which stood as the course record until 1979. The forerunner to this tournament, the Columbus Pro-Am was held on the course where he first learned to play the game of golf, Scioto Country Club, from 1966 through 1975, then the inaugural Memorial Tournament was held at Muirfield Village in 1976. The tournament has become one of the more prestigious events on the PGA Tour.

Each year, the tournament selects one or more individuals as honorees who have made a significant impact on the game. The inaugural tournament in 1976 paid tribute to the late Bobby Jones, while the 25th edition in 2000 honored Nicklaus. The honoree is selected by the Captain's Club, a group that acts independently of the tournament organization but also advises on player invitations and the general conduct of the event. Members of the Captain's Club have included Peter Alliss, Peggy Kirk Bell, Sean Connery, Arnold Palmer, and Gary Player among others.

The Memorial Tournament continues the PGA Tour's philanthropic focus through its relationships with Central Ohio charities. The most significant of which is its relationship with Nationwide Children's Hospital since 1976. The Memorial Tournament has raised more than $5.7 million to support the programs and services at Nationwide Children's Hospital in those 30-plus years. In 2005 the Memorial made a pledge that will elevate its level of giving to more than $11 million in the coming years.

Nicklaus and his wife Barbara serve as honorary chairman and active chairwoman of the Nicklaus Children's Health Care Foundation in North Palm Beach, Florida. The foundation provides valuable programs and services free of charge to more than 4,000 hospitalized children and their families through Child Life programs, the Pediatric Oncology Support Team, and the Safe Kids program. The Nicklauses established "The Jake", a pro-am golf tournament played annually at The Bear's Club in Jupiter, Florida in honor of their 17-month-old grandson who drowned in a hot tub in 2005. It has become the foundation's chief fundraiser. Players such as Robert Allenby, Raymond Floyd, Tom Watson, Ian Baker-Finch, Ernie Els, Jay Haas, Johnny Miller and Gary Player have participated.

Nicklaus and retired General John Shalikashvili, who served as Chairman of the Joint Chiefs of Staff from 1993 to 1997, are serving as honorary chairs for the American Lake Veterans Golf Course capital campaign in Tacoma, Washington. The $4.5 million campaign in 2009 was established to complete the nation's only golf course designed for the rehabilitation of wounded and disabled veterans. The existing nine-hole course is operated, maintained, and managed by 160 volunteers. Funds are needed to add nine new holes and other improvements. A two-day event was held at Bighorn Golf Club at Palm Desert, California featuring Nicklaus, who is donating his design services for the "Nicklaus Nine". In announcing his donation of services, Nicklaus said, "I was moved to see the amazing efforts at American Lake Veterans Golf Course where our wounded warriors learn to play golf with the help of an incredible army of volunteers." Monies raised during the campaign will be used to construct the new holes, complete the construction of the Rehabilitation and Learning Center, make improvements to the original holes to enhance accessibility, upgrade the maintenance facilities and restrooms, and help underwrite operational costs.

Nicklaus owns Nicklaus Golf Equipment, which he founded in 1992. Nicklaus Golf Equipment manufactures equipment in three brands: Golden Bear, Jack Nicklaus Signature, and Nicklaus Premium. These brands are designed to target golfers at different stages of golfing ability.

He is known for giving advice to younger golfers. One notable example came in 1984, when a teenage Canadian golfer who had previously met Nicklaus at an exhibition wrote him for career advice. The young golfer was right-handed but played left-handed; although he was showing considerable promise as a left-hander, he had been told that he might be an even better player if he switched to right-handed play. He wrote to Nicklaus asking for advice; Nicklaus replied advising him not to change if he was comfortable playing left-handed. The young Canadian, Mike Weir, decided to stay with left-handed play, and eventually became a Masters champion. He still keeps Nicklaus's letter framed in his home.

Nicklaus lends his name and likeness to a line of flavored lemonades from Arizona Beverage Company, the same company that sells the Arnold Palmer line of lemonade/iced tea blends.

In 2010, Nicklaus partnered with Terlato Wines to produce a collection of three Napa Valley wines: Jack Nicklaus Private Reserve (a red blend), Cabernet Sauvignon and Private Reserve White (a white blend). In 2012, Golden Bear Reserve, a Bordeaux-style red blend, was released to mark the 50th anniversary of Jack Nicklaus's first major championship victory, the 1962 U.S. Open.

== Playing style ==
During his prime, Nicklaus was consistently among the longest and straightest hitters on the PGA Tour. In 1963, he won the long-drive contest at the PGA Championship with a belt of 341 yards, 17 inches (312 meters), a record that lasted more than 20 years. He preferred the fade (left-to-right shape) for his ball flight, since this allowed the ball to stop quickly on hard and fast greens. His fades could reach long par fours and par fives in two shots. Nicklaus considers his longest drive in competition to be during the final round of the 1964 Masters on the 15th hole, where he had less than 160 yards left to the 500-yard par five. He hit an eight-iron slightly over the green for his second shot.

Nicklaus debuted as a young pro who hit the ball very high. Later, he could also hit lower-trajectory shots as needed. He also developed a right-to-left controlled draw.

In 1968, IBM kept PGA Tour statistics. Nicklaus led two categories for the season: he had an average driving distance of 275 yards, and hit 75 percent of greens in regulation; both marks were significantly ahead of his rivals.

Even though official PGA Tour statistics were not kept until 1980, Nicklaus was consistently the leader in greens hit in regulation through that year, displaying great command of the long and middle irons. Indeed, Nicklaus remained in the top six of this category through 1985 – far past his best playing years. Nicklaus also finished 10th in driving distance and 13th in driving accuracy in 1980 at age 40, which equated to a "Total Driving" composite of 23 – a statistical level not attained since, by a comfortable margin. Nicklaus led this category through 1982. One key to Nicklaus's ball-striking ability and overall power was his exceptional swing tempo. Of this Tom Watson referred to it as Nicklaus's greatest strength in its ability to remain smooth. This proved an asset, especially under pressure, which allowed him to obtain great distance control with his irons.

Nicklaus was also known for his course management skills. He would plan to hit each full shot to the optimal position, to best set up his next shot, usually aiming for level lies and clear approach lines, while favoring his preferred shot shapes. He would often hold back on power to achieve this, but had a power advantage over most rivals through the set, so that he could hit a 3-wood or 1-iron from the tee with increased accuracy to avoid trouble, with sufficient length to keep up with the drivers hit by most rivals. An exceptional example of this came in the final round of the 1966 Open Championship at Muirfield, on the 17th hole, a 530-yard par 5 hole. Nicklaus needed a birdie, but the hole was framed by tall fescue rough, and was playing downwind with very firm turf conditions. He used a 3-iron from the tee and hit the shot 290 yards, then hit a 5-iron 240 yards onto the green, two-putted for birdie, and parred the final hole to win the title.

Nicklaus was the first player to chart and document yardages on the course on a consistent, planned basis. For most of his career, he was not known for his skill on touch shots with the wedges, so he would often play to avoid wedge shots that needed less-than-full swings. Gary Player stated that Nicklaus had "the greatest mind the game has ever known".

Nicklaus was not known for being an outstanding putter, but he was often able to make the important putts when they were needed. Nicklaus's putting was highly regarded by his rivals. He was also known as a conservative player at times; he went for broke only when it was necessary. This was especially apparent on the greens, where he would often choose to be less aggressive and make sure of an easy two-putt. Nicklaus spoke about this in his autobiography. "I was a fine two-putter, but sometimes too defensive—too concerned about three-putting—to go for putts that I probably should have gone for."

== Awards and recognition ==
A Scottish bank note issued on July 14, 2005, with images of Nicklaus holding the Claret Jug and playing a shot on his way to Open victory in 1978

After Nicklaus's first year on the PGA Tour in 1962, he received the PGA Tour Rookie of the Year award. As well as receiving the PGA Tour Player of the Year five times and topping the PGA Tour money list eight times, he has also attained the Bob Jones Award and the Payne Stewart Award, among others.

Nicklaus was inducted into the World Golf Hall of Fame in the inaugural class of 1974 and the Canadian Golf Hall of Fame in 1995. His likeness was featured on a special commemorative issue five-pound note issued by the Royal Bank of Scotland, making him the first living person outside the Royal Family to appear on a British banknote. In 1999 he was on the six man short list for the BBC's Sports Personality of the Century.

In 2001, Nicklaus was honored with the "Lombardi Award of Excellence" from the Vince Lombardi Cancer Foundation. The award was created to honor Coach Lombardi's legacy, and is awarded annually to an individual who exemplifies the spirit of the Coach.

There is a Jack Nicklaus Museum on the campus of The Ohio State University in his home town of Columbus. The museum was opened in 2002 and is a state-of-the-art, 24,000-square-foot (2,200 m^{2}) facility offering a comprehensive view of Nicklaus's life and career in and out of golf as well as exhibits celebrating the history and legends of the game. Originally owned by a private company, Jack Nicklaus Museum Inc., the museum was transferred to Ohio State in 2005. In 2015, Columbus Business First reported that the museum lost $200,000 annually. After a visit to the museum in 2017, Adam Schupak of Sports Illustrated noted that it chronicled Nicklaus's life well, but lacked interactive elements.

Nicklaus had the rare privilege of "dotting the 'i'" of "Script Ohio", the signature formation of the Ohio State University Marching Band, at the Ohio State homecoming game on October 28, 2006, when the Buckeyes played Minnesota; this is considered the greatest honor that can be bestowed on a non-band member. Nicklaus was the fifth non-band member to receive this award. Other recipients include Bob Hope and Woody Hayes. While at Ohio State University, Nicklaus became a member of the Fraternity of Phi Gamma Delta.

Along with Annika Sörenstam, Nicklaus was named a Global Ambassador for the International Golf Federation in 2008 and was instrumental in bringing golf to the Olympics for the 2016 and 2020 Games. Golf was last an Olympic sport at the 1904 Games in St. Louis, Missouri when the United States and Canada were the only two competing countries. The International Olympic Committee approved the inclusion by a vote of 63–27, with two abstentions.

Nicklaus joined Arnold Palmer as an honorary starter for the 2010 Masters. Nicklaus became the eighth honorary starter since the tradition began in 1963 when Nicklaus won his first green jacket. The Big Three were once again reunited in Augusta for the 2012 Masters Tournament as Gary Player joined Palmer and Nicklaus to kick off the 76th renewal of the major tournament.

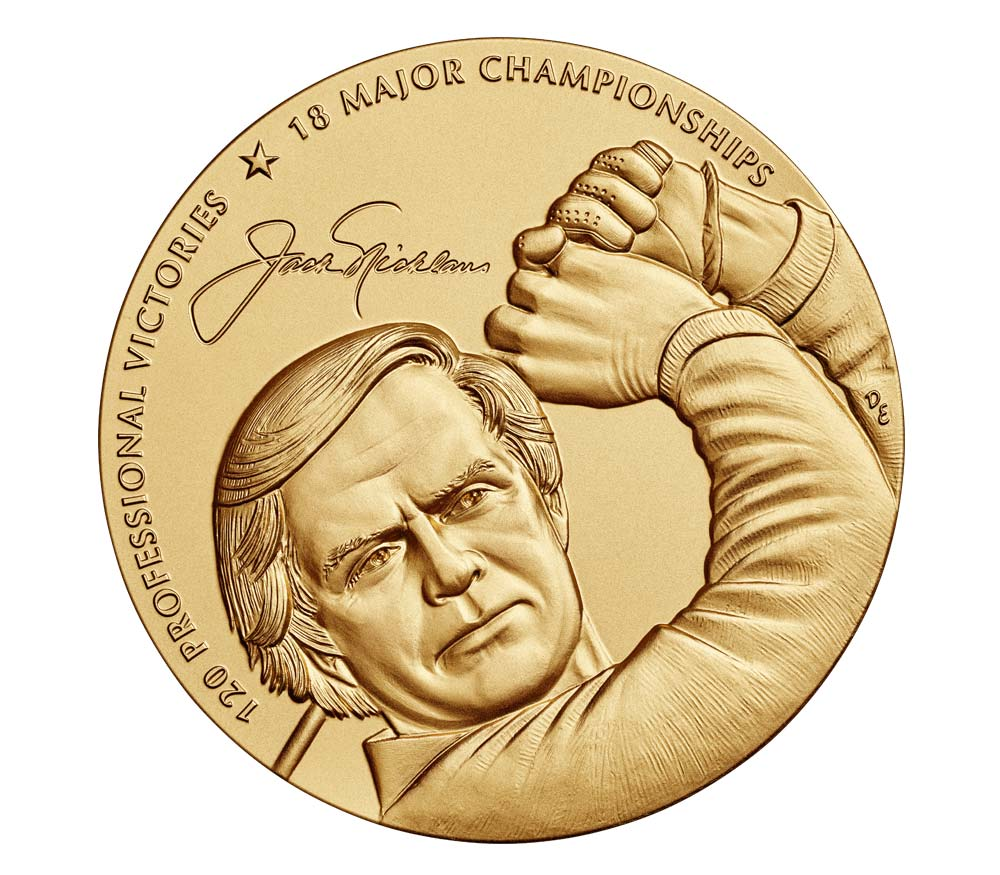
Congressional Gold Medal

Nicklaus is atop Golf Inc. magazine's list of the "Most Powerful People in Golf" for a sixth consecutive year. He is the only golf industry figure who has ever been named to the No. 1 spot for more than three years. Nicklaus topped the 2009 worldwide list of 35 individuals who were selected by a panel of editors for their ability to influence and impact the business of golf.

On May 19, 2014, the United States House of Representatives voted to pass H.R. 2203, a bill that would award Nicklaus the Congressional Gold Medal "in recognition of his service to the nation in promoting excellence and good sportsmanship". The bill says that Nicklaus's "magnetic personality and unfailing sense of kindness and thoughtfulness have endeared him to millions throughout the world". Congressman Thomas Massie objected to a voice vote, and demanded a roll call vote. He then tried to rally opposition to the measure, but the vote passed easily over Massie's objection: 371–10.

Nicklaus was awarded the Freedom of the Royal Burgh of St Andrews on July 12, 2022.

== Career achievements ==
Nicklaus holds the record for PGA major championships with a total 18; Tiger Woods is in second place with 15. Nicklaus has the third most PGA Tour victories with 73, behind Sam Snead (82) and Woods (82). Nicklaus also holds the record for the most wins at the Masters with six, and The Players Championship with three. He played on six Ryder Cup teams, captained the team twice and the Presidents Cup team four times, and topped the PGA Tour money list and scoring average eight times each. For 24 straight seasons, from 1960 to 1983 inclusive, he made at least one top ten finish in a major championship, and this is a record.

- PGA Tour wins (73)
- European Tour wins (9)
- PGA Tour of Australasia wins (3)
- Other wins (24)
- Senior PGA Tour wins (10)
- Other senior wins (7)

=== Major championships ===
==== Wins (18) ====
| Year | Championship | 54 holes | Winning score | Margin | Runner(s)-up |
|---|---|---|---|---|---|
| 1962 | U.S. Open | 2 shot deficit | −1 (72-70-72-69=283) | Playoff^{1} | (United States) Arnold Palmer |
| 1963 | Masters Tournament | 1 shot lead | −2 (74-66-74-72=286) | 1 stroke | (United States) Tony Lema |
| 1963 | PGA Championship | 3 shot deficit | −5 (69-73-69-68=279) | 2 strokes | (United States) Dave Ragan |
| 1965 | Masters Tournament (2) | 5 shot lead | −17 (67-71-64-69=271) | 9 strokes | (United States) Arnold Palmer, (South Africa) Gary Player |
| 1966 | Masters Tournament (3) | Tied for lead | E (68-76-72-72=288) | Playoff^{2} | (United States) Tommy Jacobs (2nd), (United States) Gay Brewer (3rd) |
| 1966 | The Open Championship | 2 shot deficit | −2 (70-67-75-70=282) | 1 stroke | (United States) Doug Sanders, (Wales) Dave Thomas |
| 1967 | U.S. Open (2) | 1 shot deficit | −5 (71-67-72-65=275) | 4 strokes | (United States) Arnold Palmer |
| 1970 | The Open Championship (2) | 2 shot deficit | −5 (68-69-73-73=283) | Playoff^{3} | (United States) Doug Sanders |
| 1971 | PGA Championship (2) | 4 shot lead | −7 (69-69-70-73=281) | 2 strokes | (United States) Billy Casper |
| 1972 | Masters Tournament (4) | 1 shot lead | −2 (68-71-73-74=286) | 3 strokes | (Australia) Bruce Crampton, (United States) Bobby Mitchell, (United States) Tom Weiskopf |
| 1972 | U.S. Open (3) | 1 shot lead | +2 (71-73-72-74=290) | 3 strokes | (Australia) Bruce Crampton |
| 1973 | PGA Championship (3) | 1 shot lead | −7 (72-68-68-69=277) | 4 strokes | (Australia) Bruce Crampton |
| 1975 | Masters Tournament (5) | 1 shot deficit | −12 (68-67-73-68=276) | 1 stroke | (United States) Tom Weiskopf, (United States) Johnny Miller |
| 1975 | PGA Championship (4) | 4 shot lead | −4 (70-68-67-71=276) | 2 strokes | (Australia) Bruce Crampton |
| 1978 | The Open Championship (3) | 1 shot deficit | −7 (71-72-69-69=281) | 2 strokes | (United States) Ben Crenshaw, (United States) Raymond Floyd, (United States) Tom Kite, (New Zealand) Simon Owen |
| 1980 | U.S. Open (4) | Tied for lead | −8 (63-71-70-68=272) | 2 strokes | (Japan) Isao Aoki |
| 1980 | PGA Championship (5) | 3 shot lead | −6 (70-69-66-69=274) | 7 strokes | (United States) Andy Bean |
| 1986 | Masters Tournament (6) | 4 shot deficit | −9 (74-71-69-65=279) | 1 stroke | (United States) Tom Kite, (Australia) Greg Norman |

^{1}Defeated Palmer in 18-hole playoff; Nicklaus (71), Palmer (74).
^{2}Defeated Jacobs (2nd) & Brewer (3rd) in 18-hole playoff; Nicklaus (70), Jacobs (72), Brewer (78). 1st, 2nd and 3rd prizes awarded in this playoff.
^{3}Defeated Sanders in 18-hole playoff; Nicklaus (72), Sanders (73).

=== Results timeline ===
Champion
Runner-up
Top 5
Top 10
A Did not play

LA = low amateur
CUT = missed the half-way cut
WD = withdrew
T = a tie for a place
P = Playoff

==== Amateur career ====
| Tournament | 1955 | 1956 | 1957 | 1958 | 1959 | 1960 | 1961 |
|---|---|---|---|---|---|---|---|
| Age | 15 | 16 | 17 | 18 | 19 | 20 | 21 |
| Masters Tournament | A | A | A | A | CUT | T 13 ^{LA} | T 7 |
| The Amateur Championship | A | A | A | A | QF | A | A |
| U.S. Open | A | A | CUT | T 41 | CUT | 2 ^{LA} | T 4 ^{LA} |
| The Open Championship | A | A | A | A | A | A | A |
| PGA Championship | A | A | A | A | A | A | A |
| U.S. Amateur | R256 | R64 | R32 | R128 | 1 | R32 | 1 |

==== Professional career ====
| Tournament | 1962 | 1963 | 1964 | 1965 | 1966 | 1967 | 1968 | 1969 | 1970 | 1971 | 1972 | 1973 | 1974 | 1975 | 1976 | 1977 | 1978 | 1979 | 1980 | 1981 |
|---|---|---|---|---|---|---|---|---|---|---|---|---|---|---|---|---|---|---|---|---|
| Age | 22 | 23 | 24 | 25 | 26 | 27 | 28 | 29 | 30 | 31 | 32 | 33 | 34 | 35 | 36 | 37 | 38 | 39 | 40 | 41 |
| Masters Tournament | T 15 | 1 | T 2 | 1 | 1 ^{P} | CUT | T 5 | T 24 | 8 | T 2 | 1 | T 3 | T 4 | 1 | T 3 | 2 | 7 | 4 | T 33 | T 2 |
| U.S. Open | 1 ^{P} | CUT | T 23 | T 32 | 3 | 1 | 2 | T 25 | T 49 | 2 ^{P} | 1 | T 4 | T 10 | T 7 | T 11 | T 10 | T 6 | T 9 | 1 | T 6 |
| The Open Championship | T 34 | 3 | 2 | T 12 | 1 | 2 | T 2 | T 6 | 1 ^{P} | T 5 | 2 | 4 | 3 | T 3 | T 2 | 2 | 1 | T 2 | T 4 | T 23 |
| PGA Championship | T 3 | 1 | T 2 | T 2 | T 22 | T 3 | CUT | T 11 | T 6 | 1 | T 13 | 1 | 2 | 1 | T 4 | 3 | CUT | T 65 | 1 | T 4 |

| Tournament | 1982 | 1983 | 1984 | 1985 | 1986 | 1987 | 1988 | 1989 | 1990 | 1991 | 1992 | 1993 | 1994 | 1995 | 1996 | 1997 | 1998 | 1999 | 2000 | 2001 |
|---|---|---|---|---|---|---|---|---|---|---|---|---|---|---|---|---|---|---|---|---|
| Age | 42 | 43 | 44 | 45 | 46 | 47 | 48 | 49 | 50 | 51 | 52 | 53 | 54 | 55 | 56 | 57 | 58 | 59 | 60 | 61 |
| Masters Tournament | T 15 | WD (Note: Nicklaus withdrew before the second round of the 1983 Masters due to back spasms. He had shot one over par and was tied for 42nd.) | T 18 | T 6 | 1 | T 7 | T 21 | T 18 | 6 | T 35 | T 42 | T 27 | CUT | T 35 | T 41 | T 39 | T 6 | A | T 54 | CUT |
| U.S. Open | 2 | T 43 | T 21 | CUT | T 8 | T 46 | CUT | T 43 | T 33 | T 46 | CUT | T 72 | T 28 | CUT | T 27 | T 52 | T 43 | CUT | CUT | A |
| The Open Championship | T 10 | T 29 | T 31 | CUT | T 46 | T 72 | T 25 | T 30 | T 63 | T 44 | CUT | CUT | CUT | T 79 | T 45 | T 60 | A | A | CUT | A |
| PGA Championship | T 16 | 2 | T 25 | T 32 | T 16 | T 24 | CUT | T 27 | CUT | T 23 | CUT | CUT | CUT | T 67 | CUT | CUT | A | A | CUT | A |

| Tournament | 2002 | 2003 | 2004 | 2005 |
|---|---|---|---|---|
| Age | 62 | 63 | 64 | 65 |
| Masters Tournament | A | CUT | CUT | CUT |
| U.S. Open | A | A | A | A |
| The Open Championship | A | A | A | CUT |
| PGA Championship | A | A | A | A |

==== Summary ====
| Tournament | Wins | 2nd | 3rd | Top-5 | Top-10 | Top-25 | Events | Cuts made |
|---|---|---|---|---|---|---|---|---|
| Masters Tournament | 6 | 4 | 2 | 15 | 22 | 29 | 45 | 37 |
| U.S. Open | 4 | 4 | 1 | 11 | 18 | 22 | 44 | 35 |
| The Open Championship | 3 | 7 | 3 | 16 | 18 | 21 | 38 | 32 |
| PGA Championship | 5 | 4 | 3 | 14 | 15 | 23 | 37 | 27 |
| Totals | 18 | 19 | 9 | 56 | 73 | 95 | 164 | 131 |

- Longest streak of consecutive majors played – 146 (1962 Masters – 1998 U.S. Open)
- Most consecutive cuts made – 39 (1969 Masters – 1978 Open)
- Longest streak of top-10s – 13 (1973 Masters – 1976 Masters)
- At the Open Championship, 1966–1980, Nicklaus finished 15 consecutive years in the top-6. Specifically 1st (3), 2nd (6), 3rd (2), 4th (2), 5th (1), 6th (1).
- At the Masters, 1970–1979, Nicklaus finished 10 consecutive years in the top-8. Specifically 1st (2), 2nd (2), 3rd (2), 4th (2), 7th (1), 8th (1).

=== The Players Championship ===
==== Wins (3) ====
| Year | Championship | 54 holes | Winning score | Margin | Runner-up |
|---|---|---|---|---|---|
| 1974 | Tournament Players Championship | 3 shot deficit | −16 (66-71-68-67=272) | 2 strokes | (United States) J. C. Snead |
| 1976 | Tournament Players Championship (2) | Tied for lead | −19 (66-70-68-65=269) | 3 strokes | (United States) J. C. Snead |
| 1978 | Tournament Players Championship (3) | 1 shot lead | +1 (70-71-73-75=289) | 1 stroke | (United States) Lou Graham |

==== Results timeline ====
| Tournament | 1974 | 1975 | 1976 | 1977 | 1978 | 1979 | 1980 | 1981 | 1982 | 1983 | 1984 | 1985 | 1986 | 1987 | 1988 | 1989 | 1990 | 1991 | 1992 | 1993 | 1994 | 1995 |
|---|---|---|---|---|---|---|---|---|---|---|---|---|---|---|---|---|---|---|---|---|---|---|
| The Players Championship | 1 | T18 | 1 | T5 | 1 | T33 | T14 | T29 | CUT | T19 | T33 | T17 | CUT | CUT | CUT | T29 | CUT | | | | | CUT |

Win
Top 10
Did not play

CUT = missed the halfway cut
"T" indicates a tie for a place.

=== Senior major championships ===
==== Wins (8) ====
| Year | Championship | Winning score | Margin | Runner(s)-up |
|---|---|---|---|---|
| 1990 | The Tradition at Desert Mountain | −10 (71-67-68=206) | 4 strokes | (South Africa) Gary Player |
| 1990 | Mazda Senior Tournament Players Championship | −27 (65-68-64-64=261) | 6 strokes | (United States) Lee Trevino |
| 1991 | The Tradition at Desert Mountain (2) | −11 (71-73-66-67=277) | 1 stroke | (United States) Jim Colbert, (United States) Jim Dent, (United States) Phil Rodgers |
| 1991 | PGA Seniors' Championship | −17 (66-66-69-70=271) | 6 strokes | (Australia) Bruce Crampton |
| 1991 | U.S. Senior Open | +2 (72-69-70-71=282) | Playoff^{1} | (United States) Chi-Chi Rodríguez |
| 1993 | U.S. Senior Open (2) | −6 (68-73-67-70=278) | 1 stroke | (United States) Tom Weiskopf |
| 1995 | The Tradition (3) | −12 (69-71-69-67=276) | Playoff^{2} | (Japan) Isao Aoki |
| 1996 | The Tradition (4) | −16 (68-74-65-65=272) | 3 strokes | (United States) Hale Irwin |

^{1}Defeated Rodríguez in 18-hole playoff; Nicklaus, (65), Rodríguez (69).
^{2}Defeated Aoki with a birdie on the third extra playoff hole.

==== Results timeline ====
| Tournament | 1990 | 1991 | 1992 | 1993 | 1994 | 1995 | 1996 | 1997 | 1998 | 1999 |
|---|---|---|---|---|---|---|---|---|---|---|
| The Tradition | 1 | 1 | 2 | T9 | T4 | 1 | 1 | T25 | T25 | |
| Senior PGA Championship | T3 | 1 | T10 | T9 | 9 | 8 | T22 | T2 | T6 | |
| Senior Players Championship | 1 | T22 | | T22 | T6 | 2 | T24 | T8 | 6 | |
| U.S. Senior Open | T2 | 1 | T3 | 1 | T7 | 2 | 16 | T5 | T13 | |

| Tournament | 2000 | 2001 | 2002 | 2003 | 2004 |
|---|---|---|---|---|---|
| The Tradition | T9 | T29 | 69 | T10 | |
| Senior PGA Championship | T12 | 12 | WD | CUT | WD |
| Senior Players Championship | T34 | WD | | T40 | |
| U.S. Senior Open | T21 | 4 | | T25 | |
| Senior British Open | | | | T14 | |

Win
Top 10
Did not play

CUT = missed the half-way cut
WD = withdrew
"T" indicates a tie for a place. Note: The Senior British Open was not a Champions Tour major until 2003.

==== Summary of performances ====
- Starts – 50
- Cuts made – 46 (cut once, withdrew 3 times)
- Wins – 8
- Second place finishes – 5
- Top-three finishes – 15
- Top-five finishes – 18
- Top-10 finishes – 30
- Longest streak of top-10s – 10

== See also ==
- Career Grand Slam Champions
- List of golfers with most PGA Tour wins
- List of men's major championships winning golfers
- List of golfers with most PGA Tour Champions wins
- List of golfers with most Champions Tour major championship wins
- List of golfers with most wins in one PGA Tour event
- List of golfers with most European Tour wins
- List of golf courses designed by Jack Nicklaus
- People on Scottish banknotes
