= Hesperia Open Invitational =

Golf tournament formerly on the PGA Tour

Tournament information
- Location: Hesperia, California
- Established: 1957
- Courses: Hesperia Golf and County Club
- Par: 72
- Tour: PGA Tour
- Format: Stroke play
- Prize fund: US$15,000
- Month played: October
- Final year: 1961

Tournament record score
- Aggregate: 271 John McMullin (1958); 271 Eric Monti (1959)
- To par: −17 as above

Final champion
- (United States) Tony Lema
- Location in the United States Location in California

The Hesperia Open Invitational was a golf tournament on the PGA Tour in the late 1950s and early 1960s.

It was played at the Hesperia Golf and County Club in the high desert town of Hesperia, California. The course record for lowest round (62) was set in 1959 by Gene Littler.

== Winners ==
Year	Tour (Note: PGAT − PGA Tour.)	Winner	Score	To par	Margin of victory	Runner(s)-up
1961		(United States) Tony Lema	138	−6	3 strokes	(United States) Jerry Steelsmith
1960	PGAT	(United States) Billy Casper	275	−13	5 strokes	(United States) Bob Rosburg
1959	PGAT	(United States) Eric Monti	271	−17	4 strokes	(United States) Bob Duden (United States) Jack Fleck (United States) Jay Hebert
1958	PGAT	(United States) John McMullin	271	−17	1 stroke	(United States) Gene Littler
1957	PGAT	(United States) Billy Maxwell	275	−13	2 strokes	(United States) Dow Finsterwald
