= Almaden Open =

Golf tournament in San Jose, CA

Almaden Open Invitational
Tournament information
- Location: San Jose, California
- Established: 1958
- Course: Almaden Country Club
- Par: 72
- Tour: PGA Tour
- Format: Stroke play
- Prize fund: US$46,000
- Month played: October
- Final year: 1965

Tournament record score
- Aggregate: 273 Al Geiberger (1962); 273 Bobby Verwey (1965)
- To par: −15 as above

Final champion
- (South Africa) Bobby Verwey
- Location in the United States Location in California

The Almaden Open was a golf tournament that began at the Almaden Country Club in San Jose, California in 1958, mostly with local pros. It became a PGA Tour event, the Almaden Open Invitational, in 1961 and was played until 1965. After the 1965 event, the course underwent a major overhaul for several years. In 1968, a decision was made by the new owners not to continue the tournament.

== Winners ==
Year	Tour (Note: PGAT − PGA Tour.)	Winner	Score	To par	Margin of victory	Runner(s)-up
Almaden Open Invitational
1965	PGAT	(South Africa) Bobby Verwey	273	−15	2 strokes	(United States) Billy Martindale
1964	PGAT	(United States) Billy Casper	279	−9	Playoff	(United States) Pete Brown (United States) Jerry Steelsmith
1963	PGAT	(United States) Al Geiberger (2)	277	−11	1 stroke	(United States) Dutch Harrison (United States) Dick Lotz
1962		(United States) Al Geiberger	273	−15	5 strokes	(United States) Charlie Sifford
1961	PGAT	(Australia) Jim Ferrier	279	−9	1 stroke	(United States) Bob Rosburg
Almaden Open
1960		(United States) Charlie Sifford	281	−7	Playoff	(United States) Bill Eggers
1959		(United States) Ken Venturi	281	−7	6 strokes	(United States) Bob Rosburg (United States) George Bruno (United States) Jimmy Clark (United States) Ken Still
1958		(United States) Bob Duden	212	−4	Playoff	(United States) Bob Rosburg
