= Pacific Northwest Senior PGA Championship =

The Pacific Northwest Senior PGA Championship, also known as the PNW Senior PGA Championship, is a golf championship for senior players held annually, usually in September in the Pacific Northwest. It is affiliated with the PGA of America. The Senior PGA Professional Championship was established in 1952, although a Pacific Northwest Senior Golf Championship had existed long before then at an amateur level and was even won by a former tennis star Bernie Schwengers in 1943. In the 1960s, it was held for years at the Yakima Elks' Golf and Country Club between 21 players with prize money of just $920.

== Winners ==
- 2022 Jeff Gove
- 2021 Bob Rannow
- 2020 Jeff Coston
- 2019 Jeff Coston
- 2018 Tom Sovay
- 2017 Steve Stull
- 2016 Rob Gibbons
- 2015 George Mack Jr.
- 2014 Steve Stull
- 2013 Jeff Coston
- 2012 Chuck Milne
- 2011 Jeff Coston
- 2010 Jeff Coston
- 2009 Jeff Coston
- 2008 Jeff Coston
- 2007 Jeff Coston
- 2006 Jeff Coston
- 2005 Fred Haney
- 2004 Don Bies
- 2003 Ed Fisher
- 2002 Fred Haney
- 2001 Jerry Lee
- 2000 Chuck Milne
- 1999 Michael Kahler
- 1998 Elwin Fanning
- 1997 Jim Wilkinson
- 1996 Bill Tindall
- 1995 Jim Wilkinson
- 1994 Ted Naff
- 1993 Gerry Mehlert
- 1992 Gerry Mehlert
- 1991 Tim Berg
- 1990 Lloyd Harris
- 1989 Ted Naff
- 1988 Tim Berg
- 1987 Jim Shriver
- 1986 Billy Derickson
- 1985 Ray Bennett
- 1984 Geo Lanning
- 1983 Geo Lanning
- 1982 Bob Duden
- 1981 Harvey Hixson
- 1980 Don Kirkpatrick
- 1979 Bob Duden
- 1978 Bob Duden
- 1977 Ernie Luckenotte
- 1976 Bob Duden
- 1975 Bob Duden
- 1974 Al Williams
- 1973 Bob Duden
- 1972 Bud Hofmeister
- 1971 Bob Duden
- 1970 Bill Isbill
