= 1972 PGA Tour Qualifying School graduates =

This is a list of the 1972 PGA Tour Qualifying School graduates.

The event was held at Silverado Country Club, South course, in Napa, California in late October/early November. After three 72-hole regional qualifiers, there were 81 players in the 108-hole final qualifying tournament.

== Tournament summary ==
Larry Stubblefield and John Adams tied for the lead and Stubblefield won a sudden-death playoff for the top position. A total of 25 players earned their tour card. Joe Inman, who recently graduated from Wake Forest University, participated in his first Q-school. However, he did not successfully graduate onto the PGA Tour.

== List of graduates ==
Place	Player	Notes
1	(United States) Larry Stubblefield	
2	(United States) John Adams	
T3	(United States) Pat Fitzsimons	Winner of 1969 Northwest Open
T3	(United States) Paul Purtzer	
T3	(United States) Jim Simons	
T6	(United States) Lon Hinkle	
T6	(Mexico) Victor Regalado	
T8	(United States) Bruce Ashworth	
T8	(United States) Mike McCullough	Winner of 1970 Ohio Amateur
T10	(United States) Bob Allard	
T10	(United States) Greg Edwards	
T10	(United States) Tom Kite	Winner of 1972 NCAA Championship (individual title)
T10	(United States) Andy North	Winner of 1971 Western Amateur
T14	(United States) Jim Ahern	
T14	(United States) Tom McGinnis	
T14	(Canada) John Morgan	
T17	(United States) Lloyd Hughes	
T17	(United States) Gary Sanders	
19	(United States) Don Padgett	
T20	(United States) Tim Collins	
T20	(United States) Tom Evans	
T20	(United States) Jeff Hewes	
T20	(United States) Mike Kallam	
T20	(United States) Tom Jenkins	
T20	(United States) Artie McNickle	
