= Buffalo Open =

Nike Buffalo Open
Tournament information
- Location: Hamburg, New York
- Established: 1990
- Course: Brierwood Country Club
- Par: 72
- Tour: Nike Tour
- Format: Stroke play
- Prize fund: US$200,000
- Month played: July
- Final year: 1996

Tournament record score
- Aggregate: 274 Jerry Kelly (1995)
- To par: −14 as above

Final champion
- (United States) Jimmy Green
- Location in the United States Location in New York

The Buffalo Open was a golf tournament on the Nike Tour. It was played in 1990 and then went on a hiatus until it returned in 1995 and 1996. It was played at Brierwood Country Club in Hamburg, New York.

In 1996 the winner earned $36,000.

== Winners ==
Year	Winner	Score	To par	Margin of victory	Runner(s)-up
Nike Buffalo Open
1996	(United States) Jimmy Green	276	−12	Playoff	(United States) Jeff Gove
1995	(United States) Jerry Kelly	274	−14	1 stroke	(United States) Tim Simpson
1991–1994: No tournament
Ben Hogan Buffalo Open
1990	(United States) Jeff Maggert	204	−12	1 stroke	(United States) Carl Cooper
1990	(United States) Jeff Maggert	204	−12	1 stroke	(United States) Greg Ladehoff
