= Harry Givan =

American amateur golfer (1911–1999)

Harry Given
Personal information
- Full name: Harry Given
- Born: August 26, 1911 Seattle, Washington, U.S.
- Died: December 16, 1999 (aged 88)
- Spouses: Velma (1933–1982), Peggy (1984–1999)
- Children: 3

Career
- Sport: Golf
- College: University of Washington
- Status: Amateur

Harry L. Givan (August 26, 1911 – December 16, 1999) was an American amateur golfer, insurance executive, and co-founder of Seattle's Northwest Hospital & Medical Center. He is regarded as one of the best golfers in the history of the Pacific Northwest. His major national achievement was being selected for the U.S. team in the 1936 Walker Cup. Sports Illustrated ranked Givan 37th among the best 50 athletes in Washington state in the 20th century.

== Early life ==
Givan was born in Sequim, Washington on August 26, 1911. When he was nine, his parents moved him and his sister to his uncle's residence in Seattle. He played his first golf tournament in 1923 at Inglewood Golf Club, acing the 12th hole at age 11. He won his first tournament two years later.

Givan attended Lincoln High School in Seattle's Wallingford neighborhood. He tried out for football, baseball, basketball, and golf. Golf was his least favorite of the sports he then played. He and a friend decided to earn extra money by caddying at Seattle Golf Club. He learned to play by watching Bob Johnstone, a professional who won the Northwest Open eight times.

To raise spending money and money for golf clubs, Givan boxed at the old Austin & Salt Gymnasium at 9th and Olive in Seattle. Fighters earned $3 for going the distance in a fight, and $5 for a knockout. He scored 22 knockouts.

Givan played his first PNGA Amateur at the age of 18 in 1929. He lost to Lloyd Nordstrom, a star golfer from Sand Point Country Club in Seattle.

== Education ==
By the time he graduated from Lincoln High, Givan had 19 scholarship offers. He also had an offer to play professional baseball for the San Francisco Seals. To the astonishment of the team's manager, Jim Caveny, Givan turned down a lucrative contract offer citing the fact that he wanted to go to school.

Givan attended the University of Washington and became captain of the golf team. His golf breakthrough came when he won Seattle's City Caddy Championship at the original Glendale Country Club shooting 75. Overall, however, he did not golf much in the early '30s concentrating instead on studying and earning money to get through school. He graduated from the University of Washington in 1933 with a degree in engineering, graduating with honors.

== Career ==
Immediately after graduating from college, Given went to work for Puget Sound Power & Light. However, he still played golf in his free time. In 1933, shortly after he graduated from college, Givan again entered the PNGA Amateur. He qualified with a 66 and eventually beat Bob White 3 & 1. In 1935, he won the Amateur at Seattle Golf Club beating Scotty Campbell on the 37th hole. He was also a surprise selection to the 1936 Walker Cup team.

During World War II, Givan served in the Coast Guard Reserve. After the war, he began selling insurance for Johnson Higgins. He eventually moved up to manage the company. He retired at the age of 62 to, in his words, "make more time for golf."

During the 1950s, he was among a group of businessmen who helped obtain funding and land for Northwest Hospital & Medical Center in North Seattle. He chaired its board for several years.

== Personal life ==
Givan's first wife Velma predeceased him. They were married for 49 years before her death. They had three children. He remarried Peggy Ratliff; they were married for 15 years until his death.

Givan died December 16, 1999, at Northwest Hospital & Medical Center of emphysema. He was 88.

== Awards and honors ==
In 1970, Givan was inducted into the Washington Sports Hall of Fame.

== Tournament wins ==
this list is incomplete

- 1936 Pacific Northwest Amateur, Washington Open
- 1937 Pacific Northwest Amateur
- 1942 Northwest Open
- 1945 Pacific Northwest Amateur
- 1946 Pacific Northwest Amateur
- 1961 Pacific Northwest Amateur
