= John McMullin (golfer) =

American professional golfer (1935–2021)

Personal information
- Full name: John William McMullin Jr.
- Nationality: United States
- Born: May 20, 1935 Richmond, California
- Died: November 2, 2021 (aged 86)

Career
- Sport: Golf
- College: Modesto Junior College
- Status: Professional
- Former tour: PGA Tour
- Professional wins: 5

Number of wins by tour
- PGA Tour: 1
- Other: 4

Best results in major championships (wins: 0)
- Masters Tournament: CUT: 1959
- PGA Championship: T35: 1959
- U.S. Open: CUT: 1958, 1959
- The Open Championship: DNP

John William McMullin Jr. (May 20, 1935 – November 2, 2021) was an American professional golfer. He played on the PGA Tour in the 1950s and 1960s.

== Career ==
McMullin was born in Richmond, California. He was a pupil of noted black golf instructor Lucius Bateman, whose other students included future PGA Tour winners Don Whitt, Dick Lotz and Tony Lema. McMullin attended Modesto Junior College, where he was a member of the golf team. He was the individual medalist at the Western Intercollegiate Golf Tournament in 1955.

McMullin had several top-10 finishes in his PGA Tour career including a win at the 1958 Hesperia Open Invitational and a solo 2nd-place finish at the 1959 Tijuana Open Invitational. His best finish in a major championship was T35 at the 1959 PGA Championship.

After his touring days were over, McMullin became the golf course professional at Palo Alto Municipal Golf Course.

== Amateur wins ==
- 1953 Northern California Junior Championship
- 1955 Western Intercollegiate (individual)
- 1956 Western Open Golf Championship, California State Fair Championship

== Professional wins (5) ==
=== PGA Tour wins (1) ===
| No. | Date | Tournament | Winning score | Margin of victory | Runner-up |
|---|---|---|---|---|---|
| 1 | Sep 21, 1958 | Hesperia Open Invitational | −17 (69-68-67-67=271) | 1 stroke | (United States) Gene Littler |

PGA Tour playoff record (0–1)

| No. | Year | Tournament | Opponents | Result |
|---|---|---|---|---|
| 1 | 1958 | Dallas Open Invitational | (United States) Julius Boros, (South Africa) Gary Player, (United States) Sam Snead | Snead won with birdie on first extra hole |

=== Other wins (4) ===
this list may be incomplete

- 1957 Montebello Open
- 1965 Northern California Open
- 1966 Northern California PGA Championship
- 1967 Northern California PGA Championship
