= Al Mengert =

American professional golfer (1929–2021)

Personal information
- Nationality: United States
- Born: April 7, 1929 Spokane, Washington
- Died: April 6, 2021 (aged 91)
- Height: 6 ft 0 in (1.83 m)
- Weight: 195 lb (88 kg; 13.9 st)
- Spouse: Donna (Jacobson) Mengert
- Children: 4

Career
- Sport: Golf
- College: Stanford University (attended)
- Turned professional: 1952
- Former tours: PGA Tour; Senior PGA Tour
- Professional wins: At least 17

Best results in major championships
- Masters Tournament: T9: 1958
- PGA Championship: T18: 1970
- U.S. Open: T13: 1954
- The Open Championship: DNP

Alfred John Mengert (April 7, 1929 – April 6, 2021) was an American professional golfer.

== Early life and amateur career ==
In 1929, Mengert was born in Spokane, Washington. He also grew up in Spokane. He was the son of local businessman Otto Mengert and his wife Otelia Johnson, who was the sister of U.S. Racing Hall of Fame jockey Albert Johnson.

Mengert played football at Gonzaga Prep, briefly attended Stanford University in the late 1940s, and served in the Washington Air National Guard and U.S. Air Force in the early 1950s. Mengert was first reserve for the 1951 Walker Cup team. He was runner-up in the 1952 U.S. Amateur to Jack Westland.

== Professional career ==
In 1952, Mengert turned professional. He worked mainly as a club pro while also playing on the PGA Tour. He won several non-PGA Tour events. His best finish in a major came at the 1958 Masters Tournament. After three rounds, he was tied for fourth, two shots off the lead, and finished tied for ninth. Mengert was the first round leader at the U.S. Open in 1966 at the Olympic Club in San Francisco. He was tied for seventh after 54 holes, but a final round 81 resulted in a tie for 26th place. He finished tied for third place in a rain-delayed Tucson Open in 1971. Mengert played several tournaments on the Senior PGA Tour in the 1980s.

After turning pro in 1952, Mengert's first job was as an assistant club pro under Masters champion Claude Harmon at Winged Foot, north of New York City. He was a head pro at clubs in New Jersey, St. Louis, and Sacramento. Mengert returned to the Northwest as the head pro at Tacoma Country Club in the 1960s then went to Oakland Hills in the suburbs north of Detroit, Michigan.

== Personal life ==
Mengert died April 6, 2021.

== Awards and honors ==
In 2001, he was inducted into the Pacific Northwest Golf Association's Hall of Fame.

== Amateur wins ==
- 1946 International Jaycee Junior Golf Tournament
- 1947 International Jaycee Junior Golf Tournament
- 1949 Washington State Amateur
- 1950 Mexican Amateur, Pacific Northwest Amateur, Washington State Amateur

== Professional wins ==
this list may be incomplete

- 1952 Northwest Open (as an amateur)
- 1957 New Jersey State Open
- 1958 New Jersey State Open
- 1960 New Jersey State Open, New Jersey PGA Championship, Metropolitan Open, Arizona Open
- 1963 Washington Open
- 1964 Washington Open
- 1965 Washington Open, Northern California PGA Championship, British Columbia Open
- 1966 Northwest Open
- 1968 Pacific Northwest PGA Championship
- 1969 Pacific Northwest PGA Championship
- 1971 Washington Open
- 1976 Michigan PGA Championship

== Results in major championships ==
Tournament	1952	1953	1954	1955	1956	1957	1958	1959
Masters Tournament	T34	T23	T38	T32	T24	T21	T9	CUT
U.S. Open		T21	T13	T16		T45	CUT	
PGA Championship								

Tournament	1960	1961	1962	1963	1964	1965	1966	1967	1968	1969
Masters Tournament										
U.S. Open	T38						T26	CUT		
PGA Championship		T29			CUT	T33	T49		T20	T32

Tournament	1970	1971	1972	1973	1974	1975	1976	1977	1978	1979
Masters Tournament										
U.S. Open	T54									
PGA Championship	T18			CUT				CUT		CUT

Note: Mengert never played in The Open Championship.

Top 10
Did not play

CUT = missed the half-way cut (3rd round cut in the 1964 PGA Championship)
"T" indicates a tie for a place
