= International Jaycee Junior Golf Tournament =

Junior golf tournament

The International Jaycee Junior Golf Tournament was an international and prestigious junior golf tournament that was held from 1946 to 1968, excluding 1967. The tournament initially had a small field but slowly grew in popularity and competitiveness. Due to a lack of financing, the tournament was discontinued following the 1968 tournament.

== History ==
=== Founding ===
In 1946, the U.S. Junior Chamber of Commerce – with encouragement from Herb Graffis, publisher of Golfing and Golfdom magazines – agreed to develop a golf program providing supervised competition for boys on a local, state and national level. Initially modest in significance, only 27 boys from seven states participated in the first International Jaycee Junior Golf Tournament held in Spokane, Washington, which was won by Al Mengert.

Jerry Greenbaum is presented with the championship trophy after winning the 13th International Jaycee Junior Golf Tournament in 1958.

Publicity photo from 13th International Jaycee Junior Golf Tournament held in Tucson, Arizona, in 1958. Team Minnesota (L-R): Bob Balega, Tom Maas, Bruce Hall and Jon Hoffman.

For the second annual tournament, however, full-time personnel worked with local and state sports chairmen to organize and promote the tournament in an effort to raise it to national prominence. Over subsequent tournaments, the International Jaycee Junior Golf Tournament (known as the National Jaycee Junior Golf Tournament prior to 1953) grew in status and was rivaled only by the U.S. Junior Amateur Golf Championship and the Western Junior Championship in importance. Jack Nicklaus, the 1957 International Jaycee winner, remarked that "No other tournament in junior golf forces the best from the young golfers and maintains the interest and enthusiasm as does the Jaycee International. The toughest of the world's junior golf tournaments." By 1958, approximately 35,000 boys competed for 220 spots at the 13th International Jaycee.

=== Evolving format ===
The format of the International Jaycee evolved over time. From 1946 to 1951, 36-hole medal play determined the “cut” for those players moving on to compete for the title under match play competition. Beginning in 1952, match play was eliminated and 72-hole medal play was instituted. A Class B Championship was established for players who did not make the 36-hole cut of the lowest 100 scores. States competed for team titles and a Junior Chamber International match was staged between the top entries of each of the countries entered. Participants qualified for the International Jaycee first though local and then state Jaycee competitions. The top four (some years five) players from each state competition were eligible to play at the International Jaycee Junior Golf Tournament with expenses paid by grants and sponsors.

The golfing talents of the International Jaycee competitors were among the best in the world with many players eventually turning professional. Among winners of the tournament, four players were elected to the World Golf Hall of Fame: Gene Littler, Jack Nicklaus, Raymond Floyd and Ben Crenshaw.

=== Financial struggles ===
Despite the continued popularity of the tournament among players, financial backing of the International Jaycee became problematic. Unable to secure a sponsor in 1967, the tournament was not held (although local and state events continued). The tournament was conducted in 1968 but lack of sponsorship caused the U.S. Junior Chamber of Commerce to not hold the tournament for 1969. In years following, the International Jaycee Junior Golf Tournament was not renewed.

== Winners ==
13th International Jaycee Junior Golf Tournament Souvenir Program (1958).

| Year | Champion | Course | Location |
|---|---|---|---|
| 1946 | Al Mengert | Indian Canyon Golf Course | Spokane, Washington |
| 1947 | Al Mengert | Mount Hawley Country Club | Peoria, Illinois |
| 1948 | Gene Littler | Lincoln Country Club | Lincoln, Nebraska |
| 1949 | Bud Holscher | Houston Country Club | Houston, Texas |
| 1950 | Eddie Merrins | Iowa State College Course | Ames, Iowa |
| 1951 | Doug Sanders | Hope Valley Country Club | Durham, North Carolina |
| 1952 | Tommy Jacobs | Eugene Oregon Country Club | Eugene, Oregon |
| 1953 | Jimmy Raines | University of Michigan Golf Course | Ann Arbor, Michigan |
| 1954 | Al Geiberger | University of New Mexico Golf Course | Albuquerque, New Mexico |
| 1955 | Phil Rodgers | Columbus Country Club | Columbus, Georgia |
| 1956 | Jack Rule, Jr. | Edgewood Municipal Golf Course | Fargo, North Dakota |
| 1957 | Jack Nicklaus | Scarlet Golf Course | Columbus, Ohio |
| 1958 | Jerry Greenbaum | El Rio Country Club | Tucson, Arizona |
| 1959 | Fritz Leffingwell, Jr. | Elizabeth Manor Golf Course | Portsmouth, Virginia |
| 1960 | Raymond Floyd | Gates Park Golf Course | Waterloo, Iowa |
| 1961 | Jay Sigel | Wellshire Municipal Golf Course | Denver, Colorado |
| 1962 | Mike Riley | Spring Valley Country Club | Huntington, West Virginia |
| 1963 | Don Iverson | Midland Country Club | Midland, Texas |
| 1964 | Jim Day | Mendakota Country Club | St. Paul, Minnesota |
| 1965 | Tommy McGinnis | El Dorado Country Club | Houston, Texas |
| 1966 | David Barnes | Sedgefield Country Club | Greensboro, North Carolina |
| 1967 | No tournament | | |
| 1968 | Ben Crenshaw | Shamrock Country Club | Tulsa, Oklahoma |
