= Bud Ward =

American professional golfer (1913–1968)

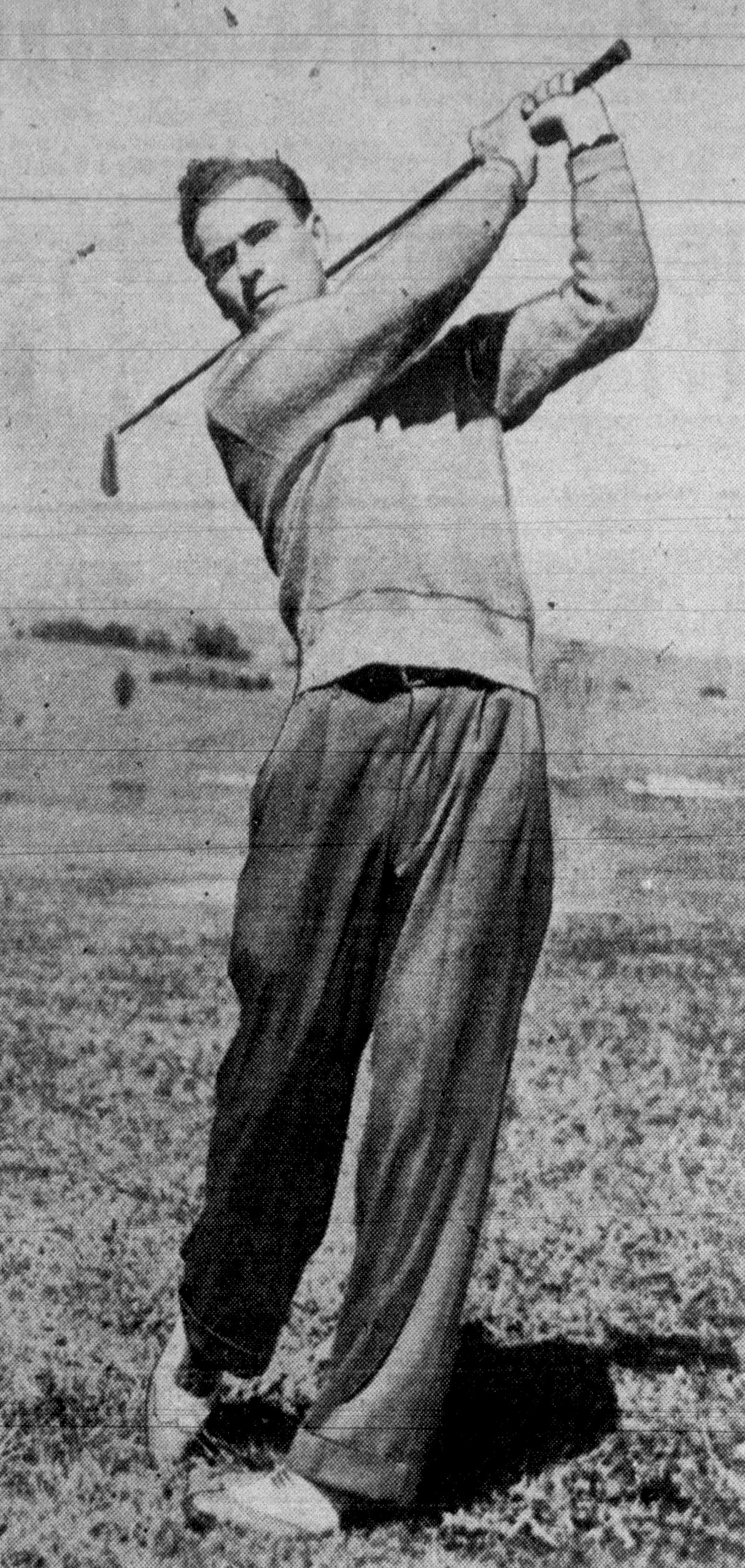
- Ward, circa 1942

Personal information
- Full name: Marvin Harvey Ward
- Nationality: United States
- Born: May 1, 1913 Elma, Washington, U.S.
- Died: January 2, 1968 (aged 54) San Mateo, California, U.S.

Career
- Sport: Golf
- Turned professional: 1949
- Professional wins: 15

Best results in major championships (wins: 2)
- Masters Tournament: T21: 1940
- PGA Championship: DNP
- U.S. Open: 4th: 1939
- The Open Championship: DNP
- U.S. Amateur: Won: 1939, 1941
- British Amateur: T5: 1947

Marvin Harvey "Bud" Ward (May 1, 1913 – January 2, 1968) was an American golfer best known for twice winning the U.S. Amateur, in 1939 and 1941.

== Early life ==
In 1913, Ward was born in Elma, Washington.

== Amateur career ==
Ward excelled as an amateur golfer, winning the U.S. Amateur twice, the Western Amateur three times, and his home state Washington Amateur twice. He played on the Walker Cup team in 1938 and 1947. His best performance in a major came in 1939 U.S. Open when he finished one shot out of a playoff with Byron Nelson, Craig Wood, and Denny Shute.

== Professional career ==
In 1949, Ward turned professional. He worked as a club pro until his death in 1968 from cancer. He died in San Mateo, California.

== Awards and honors ==
- In 1979, Ward was elected to the Pacific Northwest Golf Association Hall of Fame
- In 1981, Ward was elected to the Pacific Northwest section of the PGA of America Hall of Fame
- In 1981, he was also elected to the State of Washington Sports Hall of Fame

== Amateur wins ==
this list may be incomplete

- 1938 Washington Amateur
- 1939 U.S. Amateur
- 1940 Western Amateur
- 1941 U.S. Amateur, Western Amateur, Pacific Northwest Amateur
- 1942 Tam O'Shanter All American Amateur
- 1946 Washington Amateur
- 1947 Western Amateur

== Professional wins ==
this list may be incomplete

- 1938 Washington Open (as an amateur)
- 1939 Northwest Open (as an amateur)
- 1940 Northwest Open (as an amateur)
- 1946 Northwest Open (as an amateur)
- 1947 Northwest Open (as an amateur)
- 1948 Northwest Open (as an amateur)
- 1949 Montana Open (as an amateur), Washington Open (as an amateur)
- 1951 Northern California Open
- 1952 Utah Open
- 1955 Washington Open, Northern California PGA Championship
- 1956 Northern California Open
- 1958 Northern California PGA Championship
- 1961 Northwest Open

== Major championships ==
=== Amateur wins (2) ===
Year	Championship	Winning score	Runner-up
1939	U.S. Amateur	7 & 5	(United States) Ray Billows
1941	U.S. Amateur	4 & 3	(United States) Patrick Abbott

=== Results timeline ===
Amateur

Tournament	1936	1937	1938	1939
U.S. Amateur	R256	SF	R64	1
The Amateur Championship			R128	

Tournament	1940	1941	1942	1943	1944	1945	1946	1947	1948
U.S. Amateur	QF	1	NT	NT	NT	NT	R16	QF	R16
The Amateur Championship	NT	NT	NT	NT	NT	NT		QF	

Professional

Tournament	1938	1939
Masters Tournament	T36	
U.S. Open		4 LA

Tournament	1940	1941	1942	1943	1944	1945	1946	1947	1948	1949
Masters Tournament	T21		T28 LA	NT	NT	NT			T30	
U.S. Open	CUT	T30	NT	NT	NT	NT	T26 LA	5 LA	CUT	WD

Tournament	1950	1951	1952	1953	1954	1955	1956	1957	1958
Masters Tournament			WD			T30		T31	
U.S. Open						39		T17	T37

Note: Ward never played in The Open Championship or the PGA Championship.

Top 10
Did not play

LA = low amateur
NT = no tournament
WD = withdrew
CUT = missed the half-way cut
"T" indicates a tie for a place
R256, R128, R64, R32, R16, QF, SF = round in which player lost in match play

Source for U.S. Open and U.S. Amateur: USGA Championship Database

Source for 1938 Amateur Championship: The Glasgow Herald, May 25, 1938, pg. 21.

Source for 1947 Amateur Championship: The Glasgow Herald, May 31, 1947, pg. 5.

== U.S. national team appearances ==
Amateur

- Walker Cup: 1938, 1947 (winners)
