= Tom Johnson (golfer) =

American professional golfer (born 1981)

Personal information
- Full name: Thomas Francis Johnson
- Nationality: United States
- Born: August 19, 1981 (age 45) Sacramento, California, U.S.
- Height: 6 ft 2 in (1.88 m)
- Weight: 180 lb (82 kg; 13 st)

Career
- Sport: Golf
- College: Northwestern University
- Turned professional: 2004
- Current tour: Asian Tour
- Former tours: PGA Tour; Nationwide Tour
- Professional wins: 2

Best results in major championships
- PGA Championship: CUT: 2025

Thomas Francis Johnson (born August 19, 1981) is an American professional golfer.

Johnson was born in Sacramento, California. He turned professional in 2004 after graduating from Northwestern University with a degree in Communication Studies.

== Professional career ==
Johnson enjoyed success right away, winning medalist honors at the 2004 Canadian Tour Fall Qualifying Tournament in Ashburn, Ontario (northeast of Toronto). Shortly after, he entered the 2004 PGA Tour Qualifying Tournament and was successful in advancing through the first and second stages. By getting to the final stage, Johnson received conditional status on the Nationwide Tour in 2005.

On the Nationwide Tour in 2005 Johnson posted one top-10, a T9 finish at the Mark Christopher Charity Classic. At the Preferred Health Systems Wichita Open he had a hole-in-one on No. 8 during the second round. He finished the season 105th on the money list. He then entered the PGA Tour Qualifying Tournament where he finished tied for 33rd, missing his PGA Tour card by just one stroke. However that was good enough to earn him fully exempt status on the Nationwide Tour in 2006.

Johnson started 2006 with very little success, missing the cut 13 times in his first 20 tournaments. However he played much better at the end of the year, making 5 out of 6 cuts including Top-10 finishes at the Oregon Classic (T6) and the PalmettoPride Classic (T4). He then entered the PGA Tour Qualifying Tournament playing the best golf of his young career. Not surprisingly he finished tied for 8th at the final stage of qualifying, earning his PGA card for 2007.

As a rookie on the PGA Tour in 2007, Johnson played his first ever PGA Tour event at the Sony Open in Hawaii. He played well in the first round but was disqualified in the second round for signing an incorrect scorecard. In his second tournament, the Bob Hope Chrysler Classic, he made his first PGA Tour cut and finished tied for 18th, earning himself $56,667. That was his only Top 25 finish of the year however. He ended up in 196th spot on the final PGA Tour money list with $190,926. Only the top 125 players on the final money list remained fully exempt members of the PGA Tour in 2008. At the PGA Tour qualifying tournament in November Johnson failed to keep his card for 2008 as he finished outside the Top 25. However he placed high enough to be fully exempt on the Nationwide Tour in 2008.

Johnson started off the year on a high note finishing 3rd at the Mexico Open earning him $42,500. He had another two Top 10 finishes at the Athens Regional Foundation Classic and the Bank of America Open in Chicago. He finished with $90,270 and outside the Top 60 on the money list, thereby losing his exempt status for 2009 on the Nationwide Tour.

Johnson had only conditional status on the Nationwide Tour in 2009. He played only 7 tournaments and earned $10,690, finishing 192nd on the official money list. He has no status on the PGA Tour or Nationwide Tour in 2010.

=== Club professional ===
Johnson was one of the twenty golfers to qualify for the PGA Championship via the PGA Professional Championship. Johnson is the Director of Instruction at Meadow Club in Fairfax, California. Since his touring days, he was named the Northern California PGA Player of the Year for 2022 and 2023 and won the Northern California PGA Championship twice.

== Results in major championships ==
Tournament	2025
PGA Championship	CUT

Did not play

CUT = missed the half-way cut
"T" = tied

== Professional wins ==
- 2023 Northern California PGA Championship
- 2025 Northern California PGA Championship

== See also ==
- 2006 PGA Tour Qualifying School graduates
