= Mike McCullough (golfer) =

American golfer

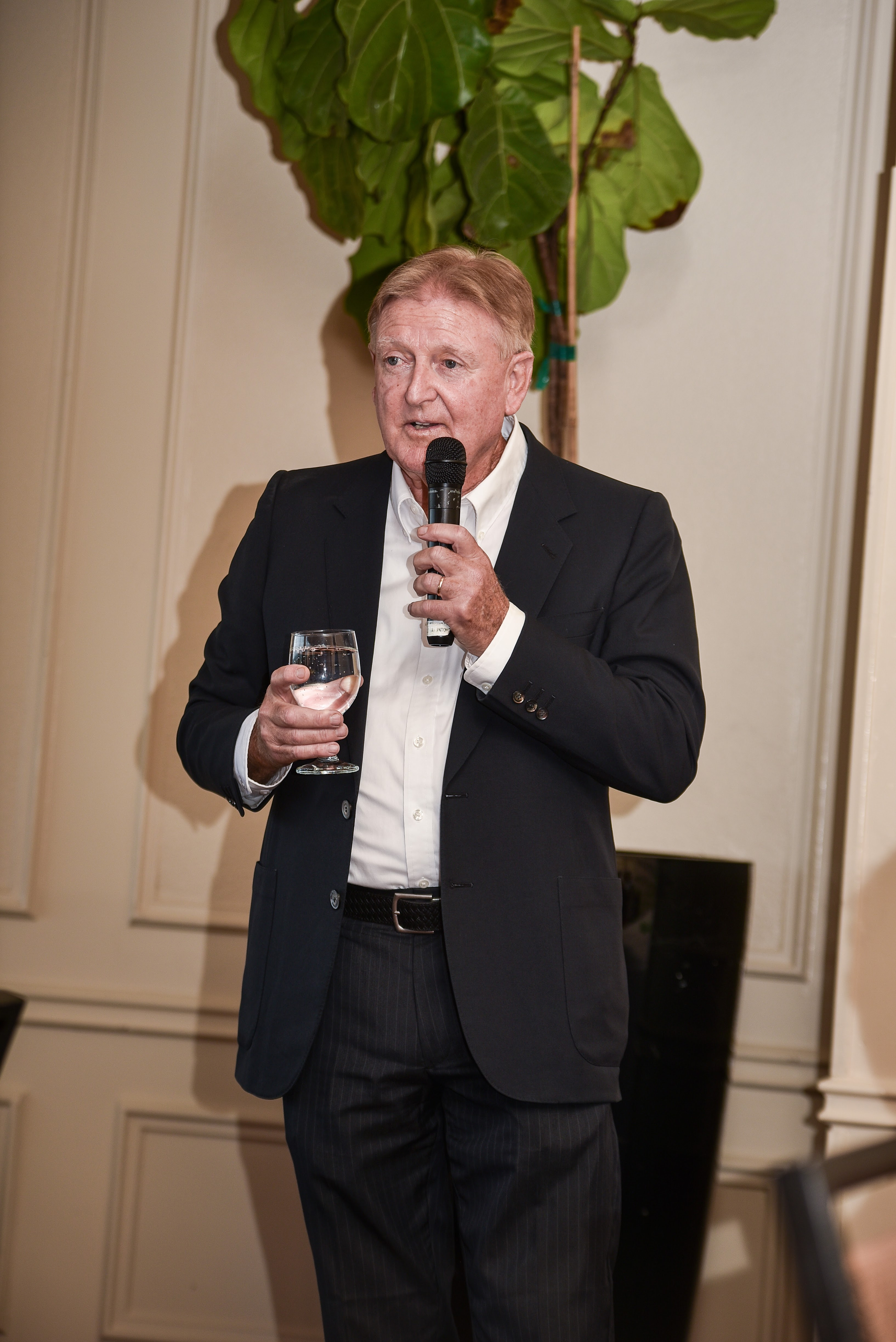

Personal information
- Full name: Michael McCullough
- Nationality: United States
- Born: March 21, 1945 (age 81) Coshocton, Ohio, U.S.
- Height: 5 ft 9 in (1.75 m)
- Weight: 170 lb (77 kg; 12 st)
- Children: 3

Career
- Sport: Golf
- College: Bowling Green State University
- Turned professional: 1970
- Former tours: PGA Tour; Champions Tour
- Professional wins: 5

Number of wins by tour
- PGA Tour Champions: 2
- Other: 3

Best results in major championships
- Masters Tournament: CUT: 1979
- PGA Championship: T40: 1977
- U.S. Open: T10: 1977
- The Open Championship: T29: 1983

Michael McCullough (born March 21, 1945) is an American professional golfer. He has played on the PGA Tour, Nationwide Tour, and the Champions Tour.

== Career ==
McCullough was born in Coshocton, Ohio. He was introduced to golf by his grandfather. In 1970, McCullough turned pro. He joined the PGA Tour after his success at 1972 PGA Tour Qualifying School.

In 401 starts on the PGA Tour and 33 starts on the Nationwide Tour, McCullough never tasted victory. He did finish 2nd at the 1977 Tournament Players Championship. After reaching the age of 50 in March 1995, he joined the Senior PGA Tour. His first win on the Champions Tour – at the Mexico Senior Classic in 2001 – came just before his 56th birthday. He won the Emerald Coast Classic about a month later, and the Georgia-Pacific Grand Champions Championship in 2005.

== Personal life ==
McCullough lives in Scottsdale, Arizona. He has three children: Jason, graduate of Brown University with a degree in Economics and later graduated from George Washington University with his J.D.; Mark, and Michelle, graduates of Trinity University both with degrees in history.

== Awards and honors ==
- In 1999, McCullough was inducted into the Toledo Golf Hall of Fame.
- He is also a member of the Bowling Green Athletic Hall of Fame.

== Amateur wins ==
- 1970 Ohio Amateur

== Professional wins (5) ==
=== Regular career wins (2) ===
- 1974 Mini-Kemper Open
- 1977 Magnolia State Classic

=== Senior PGA Tour wins (2) ===
No.	Date	Tournament	Winning score	Margin of victory	Runner(s)-up
1	Feb 25, 2001	Mexico Senior Classic	−12 (68-68-68=204)	1 stroke	(United States) Jim Colbert, (United States) Bob Eastwood
2	Mar 25, 2001	Emerald Coast Classic	−10 (67-68-65=200)	Playoff	(United States) Andy North

Senior PGA Tour playoff record (1–0)

No.	Year	Tournament	Opponent	Result
1	2001	Emerald Coast Classic	(United States) Andy North	Won with par on first extra hole

=== Other wins (1) ===
- 2005 Georgia-Pacific Grand Champions Championship

== Results in major championships ==
Tournament	1974	1975	1976	1977	1978	1979	1980	1981	1982	1983	1984
Masters Tournament					WD	CUT					
U.S. Open	T51			T10	T12	CUT					CUT
The Open Championship										T29	
PGA Championship				T40	T58	CUT				CUT	

Top 10
Did not play

CUT = missed the half-way cut
WD = withdrew
"T" = tied

== Results in The Players Championship ==
Tournament	1974	1975	1976	1977	1978	1979	1980	1981	1982	1983	1984	1985	1986	1987	1988
The Players Championship	T13	T45	T27	2	T12	T12	T24	CUT	T47	T27	WD				T69

Top 10
Did not play

CUT = missed the halfway cut
WD = withdrew
"T" indicates a tie for a place

== See also ==
- 1972 PGA Tour Qualifying School graduates
- 1985 PGA Tour Qualifying School graduates
