= Pat Fitzsimons =

American professional golfer (born 1950)

Personal information
- Nationality: United States
- Born: December 15, 1950 (age 75) Coos Bay, Oregon, U.S.
- Height: 5 ft 11 in (1.80 m)
- Weight: 172 lb (78 kg; 12.3 st)
- Spouse: Annette

Career
- Sport: Golf
- College: University of Oregon
- Turned professional: 1971
- Former tour: PGA Tour
- Professional wins: 11

Number of wins by tour
- PGA Tour: 1
- Other: 10

Best results in major championships
- Masters Tournament: T22: 1975
- PGA Championship: T43: 1976
- U.S. Open: T9: 1975
- The Open Championship: DNP

Pat Fitzsimons (born December 15, 1950) is an American professional golfer. He played on the PGA Tour.

== Career ==
In 1950, Fitzsimons was born in Coos Bay, Oregon. He attended the University of Oregon.

In 1971, Fitzsimons turned professional. He had eleven top-10 finishes in official PGA Tour events including a win at the 1975 Glen Campbell-Los Angeles Open. His career year was also in 1975 when he received Golf Digest's "Most Improved Golfer" award and was named Oregon's pro athlete of the year. His best finish in a major championship was T-9 at the 1975 U.S. Open.

Fitzsimons played some on the Nike Tour during his late forties to prepare for the Senior PGA Tour. His best finish in a Nike Tour event was a T-5 at the 1995 NIKE Tri-Cities Open. After reaching the age of 50 in December 2000, he began play on the Senior PGA Tour but with very limited success.

Fitzsimons works with Bobby Walzel and Bunky Henry at GolfQuest, a Houston-based company which organizes corporate golf retreats. He also works as a teaching pro at The Palms Golf Club in La Quinta, California.

== Personal life ==
Fitzsimons lived in Prineville, Oregon during much of his regular career. He now lives in the San Diego County, California.

Fitzsimons is married to Annette and has two sons.

== Awards and honors ==
- In 1975, he earned Golf Digest's Most Improved Golfer Award.
- In 1975, he also was awarded Oregon's Professional Athlete of the Year.

== Professional wins (11) ==
=== PGA Tour wins (1) ===
No.	Date	Tournament	Winning score	Margin of victory	Runner-up
1	Feb 23, 1975	Glen Campbell-Los Angeles Open	−9 (70-71-64-70=275)	4 strokes	(United States) Tom Kite

=== Other wins (10) ===
- 1968 Oregon Open (as an amateur)
- 1969 Northwest Open (as an amateur)
- 1976 Pacific Northwest PGA Championship
- 1977 Northwest Open
- 1981 Northwest Open
- 1983 Pacific Northwest PGA Championship, Al C. Giusti Memorial Tournament
- 1985 Pacific Northwest PGA Championship
- 1990 Oregon Open
- 1995 Al C. Giusti Memorial Tournament

== See also ==
- 1972 PGA Tour Qualifying School graduates
- 1989 PGA Tour Qualifying School graduates
