= Charles Congdon =

American golfer

Personal information
- Full name: Charles Willsie Congdon
- Nationality: United States
- Born: November 12, 1909 Blaine, Washington, U.S.
- Died: February 28, 1965 (aged 55)

Career
- Sport: Golf
- Status: Professional
- Former tour: PGA Tour
- Professional wins: At least 20

Number of wins by tour
- PGA Tour: 2

Best results in major championships
- Masters Tournament: T39: 1947
- PGA Championship: T3: 1944
- U.S. Open: T12: 1948
- The Open Championship: DNP

Charles Willsie Congdon (November 12, 1909 – February 28, 1965) was an American professional golfer from the Pacific Northwest whose career spanned four decades: 1930s–1960s.

== Professional career ==
Congdon was the club professional at Tacoma Country and Golf Club from 1935 to 1965. During World War II, he worked as an aircraft plant inspector in Tacoma. Congdon was instrumental in forming the Pacific Northwest Section PGA and served three terms as president. He also served as a vice-president of the PGA of America from 1955–1957.

Congdon was the recipient of several honors. The Hudson Cup Matches are conducted by the Pacific Northwest Section of the PGA of America in cooperation with the Oregon and Washington State Golf Associations. The award given to the top amateur, the Charles Congdon Award, is named in his honor. In addition, the Pacific Northwest Section PGA elected him Golf Professional of the Year during his lifetime.

== Awards and honors ==
- In 1978, Congdon was inducted into the State of Washington Sports Hall of Fame
- In 1981, he was inducted into the Pacific Northwest Section PGA's Hall of Fame

== Professional wins (20) ==
=== PGA Tour wins (1) ===
No.	Date	Tournament	Winning score	Margin of victory	Runners-up
1	Aug 17, 1947	Portland Open Invitational	−18 (68-72-66-64=270)	6 strokes	(United States) Clayton Heafner, (United States) Herman Keiser, (United States) Johnny Palmer, (United States) George Payton

=== Other wins ===
this list is probably incomplete

- 1936 Pacific Northwest PGA Championship
- 1938 Pacific Northwest PGA Championship
- 1939 Washington Open
- 1946 British Columbia Open
- 1947 Oregon Open, Washington Open, Pacific Northwest PGA Championship
- 1948 British Columbia Open, Canadian Open
- 1950 Washington Open, Pacific Northwest PGA Championship
- 1951 British Columbia Open
- 1952 Washington Open, Pacific Northwest PGA Championship, British Columbia Open
- 1953 British Columbia Open
- 1956 British Columbia Open
- 1962 Washington Open
- 1963 Pacific Northwest PGA Championship
