= Don Bies =

American professional golfer (born 1937)

Personal information
- Nationality: United States
- Born: December 10, 1937 (age 88) Cottonwood, Idaho, U.S.
- Height: 6 ft 1 in (1.85 m)
- Weight: 170 lb (77 kg; 12 st)

Career
- Sport: Golf
- Turned professional: 1957
- Former tours: PGA Tour; Champions Tour
- Professional wins: 30

Number of wins by tour
- PGA Tour: 1
- PGA Tour of Australasia: 1
- PGA Tour Champions: 7
- Other: 15 (regular); 6 (senior)

Best results in major championships
- Masters Tournament: T33: 1969
- PGA Championship: T7: 1967
- U.S. Open: T5: 1968
- The Open Championship: 65th: 1980

Don Bies (born December 10, 1937) is an American former professional golfer who has won tournaments on the PGA Tour, the Senior PGA Tour (now known as the Champions Tour), and in the Pacific Northwest Section of the PGA of America.

== Early life ==
Bies was born in Cottonwood, Idaho. He attended Ballard High School in Seattle, Washington.

== Professional career ==
In 1957, Bies turned pro. His only PGA Tour win came at the 1975 Sammy Davis Jr.-Greater Hartford Open. His best finish in a major was a T-5 at the 1968 U.S. Open that was played at Oak Hill Country Club in Rochester, New York. He left the PGA Tour in 1980 in order to devote full-time to his restaurant he had opened just outside Seattle.

Bies has also had much success in local events in the Pacific Northwest. He is a three-time winner of the Washington Open and a six-time winner of the Washington State Match Play Championship.

=== Senior career ===
After turning 50 at the end of 1987, Bies joined the Senior PGA Tour, where his fortunes improved dramatically for winning tournaments. He has won numerous events both on the regular Senior PGA Tour and in non-Tour senior events. These wins include a senior major championship – The Tradition at Desert Mountain in 1989.

== Awards and honors ==
In 1994, Bies was elected a member of the Pacific Northwest PGA Hall of Fame.

== Professional wins (30) ==
=== PGA Tour wins (1) ===
No.	Date	Tournament	Winning score	Margin of victory	Runner-up
1	Aug 17, 1975	Sammy Davis Jr.-Greater Hartford Open	−15 (65-66-67-69=267)	Playoff	(United States) Hubert Green

PGA Tour playoff record (1–0)

No.	Year	Tournament	Opponent	Result
1	1975	Sammy Davis Jr.-Greater Hartford Open	(United States) Hubert Green	Won with birdie on second extra hole

=== PGA Tour of Australia wins (1) ===
No.	Date	Tournament	Winning score	Margin of victory	Runners-up
1	Oct 29, 1989	Air New Zealand Shell Open	−5 (70-71-69-65=275)	4 strokes	(Australia) Brad Andrews, (Australia) Glenn Joyner

=== Other wins (15) ===
this list may be incomplete

- 1959 Washington Open
- 1961 Washington State Match Play
- 1962 Northwest Open
- 1963 Washington State Match Play
- 1964 Washington State Match Play
- 1965 Washington State Match Play
- 1967 Pacific Northwest PGA Championship
- 1968 Washington State Match Play
- 1980 Washington Open, British Columbia Open
- 1983 Washington State Match Play
- 1984 Northwest Open
- 1987 Washington Open, PNW PGA Al Guisti Memorial
- 1988 PNW PGA Al Giusti Memorial

=== Senior PGA Tour wins (7) ===
Legend
Senior PGA Tour major championships (1)
Other Senior PGA Tour (6)

No.	Date	Tournament	Winning score	Margin of victory	Runner-up
1	Jun 19, 1988	Northville Long Island Classic	−14 (69-67-66=202)	2 strokes	(New Zealand) Bob Charles
2	Dec 4, 1988	GTE Kaanapali Classic	−12 (68-67-69=204)	1 stroke	(United States) Don January
3	Apr 2, 1989	Murata Seniors Reunion	−8 (68-67-73=208)	6 strokes	(South Africa) Harold Henning
4	Apr 16, 1989	The Tradition	−13 (71-70-68-66=275)	1 stroke	(South Africa) Gary Player
5	Dec 9, 1989	GTE Kaanapali Classic (2)	−12 (68-64=132)	1 stroke	(United States) Dale Douglass
6	Jun 7, 1992	PaineWebber Invitational	−13 (66-71-66=203)	1 stroke	(United States) Lee Trevino
7	Oct 15, 1995	Raley's Senior Gold Rush	−11 (69-68-68=205)	1 stroke	(United States) Lee Trevino

Senior PGA Tour playoff record (0–1)

No.	Year	Tournament	Opponents	Result
1	1989	Northville Long Island Classic	(United States) Butch Baird, (United States) Frank Beard, (United States) Orville Moody	Baird won with birdie on first extra hole

=== Other senior wins (6) ===
- 1989 DuPont Cup (Japan vs. U.S. Senior Golf Match)
- 1990 Chrysler Cup
- 2002 Washington State PGA Senior Invitational
- 2003 Washington State PGA Senior Invitational
- 2004 Pacific Northwest Senior PGA Championship, Oregon Senior Open

== Champions Tour major championships ==
=== Wins (1) ===
Year	Championship	Winning score	Margin	Runner-up
1989	The Tradition at Desert Mountain	−13 (71-70-68-66=275)	1 stroke	(South Africa) Gary Player
