= Northern California PGA Championship =

The Northern California PGA Championship is a golf tournament that is the championship of the Northern California section of the PGA of America. Mark Fry, long-time pro at Sequoyah Country Club in Oakland, California, holds the record for most victories with 10. Tony Lema, British Open winner in 1964 and 12-time PGA Tour winner, won three consecutive Northern California PGA championships from 1962–64. Other PGA Tour winners who were also victorious in the Northern California PGA Championship include Bob Lunn (six-time PGA tour winner), Dick Lotz (three-time PGA tour winner), Bruce Summerhays (three-time PGA tour winner, Bob Wynn, and John McMullin.

== Winners ==
- 2026 Andrew Larkin
- 2025 Tom Johnson
- 2024 Brad Marek
- 2023 Tom Johnson
- 2022 Scott de Borba
- 2021 Michael Duncan
- 2020 Steve Watanabe
- 2019 Stuart Smith
- 2018 Jeff Brehaut
- 2017 Jason Schmuhl
- 2016 Jason Schmuhl
- 2015 David Solomon
- 2014 Jason Schmuhl
- 2013 Don Winter
- 2012 Mitch Lowe
- 2011 Stuart Smith
- 2010 Jason Schmuhl
- 2009 Mitch Lowe
- 2008 Jason Schmuhl
- 2007 Tim Huber
- 2006 Rick Leibovich
- 2005 Steve Hummel
- 2004 Rick Leibovich
- 2003 Jin Park
- 2002 Kris Moe
- 2001 Rick Leibovich
- 2000 Rich Bin
- 1999 Steve Hummel
- 1998 Mick Soli
- 1997 Steve Hummell
- 1996 Bob Borowicz
- 1995 Shawn McEntee
- 1994 Shawn McEntee
- 1993 Jim Kane
- 1992 Ed Luethke
- 1991 Nate Pomeroy
- 1990 Bob Borowicz
- 1989 Brad Schneider
- 1988 Glen Stubblefield
- 1987 Bob Klein
- 1986 Bob Lunn
- 1985 Dick Lotz
- 1984 Larry Babica
- 1983 Bob Wynn
- 1982 Mike Watney
- 1981 George Buzzini, Jr.
- 1980 Dick McClean
- 1979 Bruce Summerhays
- 1978 Bob Boldt
- 1977 Steve Taylor
- 1976 Steve Taylor
- 1975 Ken Towns
- 1974 Harold Firstman
- 1973 Ken Towns
- 1972 Ken Towns
- 1971 Ken Towns
- 1970 Ken Towns
- 1969 Rick Jetter
- 1968 Scotty McBeath
- 1967 John McMullin
- 1966 John McMullin
- 1965 Al Mengert
- 1964 Tony Lema
- 1963 Tony Lema
- 1962 Tony Lema
- 1961 Bob Moore
- 1960 Dick Stranahan
- 1959 John Zontek
- 1958 Bud Ward
- 1956 Bob Moore
- 1955 Bud Ward
- 1954 George Buzzini, Sr.
- 1953 John Geertson
- 1952 Pat Markovich
- 1951 Sherm Elworthy
- 1946–50 No record
- 1945 Harold Sampson
- 1944 Mark Fry
- 1943 Mark Fry
- 1942 No record
- 1941 Mark Fry
- 1940 Ben Coltrin
- 1939 Mark Fry
- 1938 Mark Fry
- 1937 Mark Fry
- 1936 Mark Fry
- 1935 Mark Fry
- 1934 Mark Fry
- 1933 Charles Sheppard
- 1932 Ben Coltrin
- 1931 Harold Sampson
- 1930 John Black
- 1929 Mark Fry
- 1928 Harold Sampson
- 1927 Walter Young
- 1926 Harold Sampson
- 1925 Harold Sampson
- 1924 Harold Sampson
- 1923 Harold Sampson
- 1922 Harold Sampson
