= David Eger =

American professional golfer (born 1952)

Personal information
- Full name: David Benjamin Eger
- Nationality: United States
- Born: March 17, 1952 (age 74) Fort Meade, Maryland, U.S.
- Height: 6 ft 0 in (1.83 m)
- Weight: 190 lb (86 kg; 14 st)
- Spouse: Tricia Santillo Eger

Career
- Sport: Golf
- College: University of North Carolina; East Tennessee State
- Turned professional: 1978 (reinstated amateur); 2001
- Current tour: Champions Tour
- Former tour: PGA Tour
- Professional wins: 4

Number of wins by tour
- PGA Tour Champions: 4

Best results in major championships
- Masters Tournament: CUT: 1989
- PGA Championship: CUT: 1978
- U.S. Open: CUT: 1998
- The Open Championship: DNP

David Benjamin Eger (born March 17, 1952) is an American professional golfer on the Champions Tour.

== Early life and amateur career ==
Eger was born in Fort Meade, Maryland. He attended the University of North Carolina, and later East Tennessee State University.

== Professional career ==
Eger turned professional in 1978 but won only $31,014 in 58 PGA Tour events with one top-10 finish.

== Re-instated amateur status ==
In 1982, he went to work as a golf administrator and regained his amateur status. He served as Director of Tournament Administration for the PGA Tour from 1982–92; Senior Director of Rules and Competition for the USGA from 1992–95; and as Vice-President of Competition for the PGA Tour from 1995-96.

As a golf administrator, Eger kept his skills intact by playing competitively as an amateur, winning the 1988 U.S. Mid-Amateur and the North and South Amateur in 1991. He was also a three-time Walker Cup team member and two-time semi-finalist in the U.S. Amateur.

== Second professional career ==
Eger turned professional for the second time in 2001. He earned a spot on the Champions Tour through qualifying school after preparing with the help of golf instructor David Leadbetter. He has four victories on the tour. Eger won the 2003 MasterCard Classic — the first Champions Tour event ever held in Mexico, and a winner's prize of $300,000. He won his second title in 2005 by shooting a final-round 67 in the inaugural Boeing Greater Seattle Classic, winning $240,000. His 54-hole score of 199 was 17 under par, three strokes ahead of Tom Kite.

Eger won the Champions Tour Player of the Month award in March 2003.

Eger was the individual who alerted rules officials of Tiger Woods's illegal drop during the second round of the 2013 Masters Tournament.

== Personal life ==
Eger lives in Charlotte, North Carolina with his wife Tricia. He has two children.

== Awards and honors ==
In March 2003, Eger won the Champions Tour's Player of the Month award.

== Amateur wins ==
- 1988 U.S. Mid-Amateur
- 1991 North and South Amateur
- 1999 Azalea Invitational
- 2000 Azalea Invitational, North and South Amateur

== Professional wins (4) ==
=== Champions Tour wins (4) ===
No.	Date	Tournament	Winning score	Margin of victory	Runner(s)-up
1	Mar 9, 2003	MasterCard Classic	−12 (69-70-65=204)	1 stroke	(Republic of Ireland) Eamonn Darcy, (United States) Hale Irwin, (United States) Tom Jenkins, (United States) Bruce Lietzke
2	Aug 21, 2005	Boeing Greater Seattle Classic	−17 (68-64-67=199)	3 strokes	(United States) Tom Kite
3	May 2, 2010	Mississippi Gulf Resort Classic	−11 (68-68-69=205)	1 stroke	(United States) Tommy Armour III
4	Apr 24, 2011	Liberty Mutual Legends of Golf (with (Republic of Ireland) Mark McNulty)	−27 (64-64-61=189)	Playoff	(United States) Scott Hoch and (United States) Kenny Perry

Champions Tour playoff record (1–2)

No.	Year	Tournament	Opponent(s)	Result
1	2007	Boeing Classic	(United States) R. W. Eaks, (United States) Gil Morgan, (Japan) Naomichi Ozaki, (United States) Dana Quigley, (United States) Craig Stadler, (Zimbabwe) Denis Watson	Watson won with eagle on second extra hole Eger, Morgan, Ozaki and Quigley eliminated by birdie on first hole
2	2011	Liberty Mutual Legends of Golf (with (Republic of Ireland) Mark McNulty)	(United States) Scott Hoch and (United States) Kenny Perry	Won with par on second extra hole
3	2011	Senior PGA Championship	(United States) Tom Watson	Lost to birdie on first extra hole

== Results in major championships ==
Tournament	1978	1979	1980	1981	1982	1983	1984	1985	1986	1987	1988	1989
Masters Tournament												CUT
U.S. Open												
PGA Championship	CUT											

Tournament	1990	1991	1992	1993	1994	1995	1996	1997	1998
Masters Tournament									
U.S. Open									CUT
PGA Championship									

Did not play

CUT = missed the half-way cut
Note: Eger never played in The Open Championship.

== U.S. national team appearances ==
Amateur

- Walker Cup: 1989, 1991 (winners), 2001
- Eisenhower Trophy: 1990, 2000 (winners)

== See also ==
- Spring 1979 PGA Tour Qualifying School graduates
