= Davie Black =

Scottish golfer

Personal information
- Full name: David Lambie Black
- Nationality: Scotland
- Born: 15 September 1883 Troon, Ayrshire, Scotland
- Died: 25 March 1974 (aged 90) North Vancouver, British Columbia, Canada

Career
- Sport: Golf
- Status: Professional
- Professional wins: 9

Best results in major championships
- Masters Tournament: DNP
- PGA Championship: DNP
- U.S. Open: T30: 1912
- The Open Championship: CUT: 1903

Achievements and awards
- Canadian Golf Hall of Fame: 1972

David Lambie Black (15 September 1883 – 25 March 1974) was a Scottish-born professional golfer who played primarily in Canada.

== Professional career ==
Black was runner-up in the 1911 Canadian Open.

== Personal life ==
His son Ken Black won a 1936 PGA Tour event. His older brother John was also a professional golfer.

== Awards and honors ==
He is a member of the Canadian Golf Hall of Fame

== Professional wins ==
Note: This list may be incomplete.

- 1913 Canadian PGA Championship
- 1919 Canadian PGA Championship
- 1920 Canadian PGA Championship, Northwest Open
- 1921 Canadian PGA Championship
- 1922 Northwest Open
- 1924 Washington Open
- 1928 British Columbia Open
- 1930 British Columbia Open

== Results in major championships ==
Tournament	1903	1904	1905	1906	1907	1908	1909	1910	1911	1912	1913
U.S. Open	DNP	DNP	DNP	DNP	DNP	DNP	DNP	DNP	DNP	T30	CUT
The Open Championship	CUT	DNP	DNP	DNP	DNP	DNP	DNP	DNP	DNP	DNP	DNP

Note: Black never played in the Masters Tournament or the PGA Championship.
DNP = Did not play
CUT = Missed the cut
"T" indicates a tie for a place
