= Central New York PGA Championship =

The Central New York PGA Championship is a golf tournament that is the championship of the Central New York section of the PGA of America. The tournament has been played annually since 1963. With his victory in 2020, Eric Manning is the only five-time champion. No PGA Tour winner has also won the Central New York PGA Championship.

== Winners ==
Year	Champion	Venue	Location
2026	Eric Manning	Shenendoah at Turning Stone	Verona, New York
2025	Nick Serafino	Shenendoah at Turning Stone	Verona, New York
2024	Dennis Colligan	Onondaga Golf & Country Club	Fayetteville, New York
2023	Michael Deuel	Corning Country Club	Corning, New York
2022	Eric Manning	Thendara Golf Club	Thendara, New York
2021	Eric Manning	Timber Banks Golf Club	Baldwinsville, New York
2020	Eric Manning	Seven Oaks Golf Club	Hamilton, New York
2019	Matthew Jaynes	Turning Stone Resort & Casino	Verona, New York
2018	Eric Manning	Teugega Country Club	Rome, New York
2017	Dennis Colligan	Shenendoah at Turning Stone	Verona, New York
2016	Dennis Colligan	Seven Oaks Golf Club	Hamilton, New York
2015	Kevin Savage	Shenendoah Golf Club	Verona, New York
2014	Kevin Savage	Shenendoah Golf Club	Verona, New York
2013	Michael Deuel	Binghamton Country Club	Binghamton, New York
2012	Eric Manning	Turning Stone Resort & Casino	Verona, New York
2011	Mark Tucker	Turning Stone Resort & Casino	Verona, New York
2010	Dennis Colligan	Turning Stone Resort & Casino	Verona, New York
2009	Tony Saraceno	Turning Stone Resort & Casino	Verona, New York
2008	Jeff Reader	Turning Stone Resort & Casino	Verona, New York
2007	Eric Manning	Turning Stone Resort & Casino	Verona, New York
2006	Eric Manning	Turning Stone Resort & Casino	Verona, New York
2005	Mike Deuel	Shenendoah Golf Club	Verona, New York
2004	Kevin Savage	Shenendoah Golf Club	Verona, New York
2003	David Branham	Kaluhyat Golf Club	Verona, New York
2002	Trey Walewski	Seven Oaks Golf Club	Hamilton, New York
2001	Jay Turcsik	Seven Oaks Golf Club	Hamilton, New York
2000	Jay Turcsik	Wayne Hills Country Club	Lyons, New York
1999	Tom Stone	Yahnundasis Golf Club	New Hartford, New York
1998	Todd Manderson	Vestal Hills Country Club	Binghamton, New York
1997	Bruce Martins	Lake Shore Yacht & Country Club	Cicero, New York
1996	Tony Saraceno	Links at Hiawatha	Apalachin, New York
1995	Kevin Savage	Seven Oaks Golf Club	Hamilton, New York
1994	Stan Gorman	Teugega Country Club	Rome, New York
1993	Joe Tesori	Vestal Hills Country Club	Binghamton, New York
1992	Tony Saraceno	Binghamton Country Club	Binghamton, New York
1991	Tom Gleeton	Seven Oaks Golf Club	Hamilton, New York
1990	Alan Schulte	Wayne Hills Country Club	Lyons, New York
1989	Tom Gleeton	Seven Oaks Golf Club	Hamilton, New York
1988	Bruce Martins	Skaneateles Country Club	Skaneateles, New York
1987	Mel Baum	Radisson Greens Golf Club	Baldwinsville, New York
1986	Bill Galloway	Skaneateles Country Club	Skaneateles, New York
1985	Bill Galloway	Wayne Hills Country Club	Lyons, New York
1984	Bill Galloway	Radisson Greens Golf Club	Baldwinsville, New York
1983	Hank Furgol	Teugega Country Club	Rome, New York
1982	Dave Ferris	Vestal Hills Country Club	Binghamton, New York
1981	Bill Lach	En-Joie Golf Club	Endicott, New York
1980	Bill Galloway	En-Joie Golf Club	Endicott, New York
1979	Joe Tesori	En-Joie Golf Club	Endicott, New York
1978	Jerry Steelsmith	Binghamton Country Club	Binghamton, New York
1977	Joe Lanza	Onondaga Country Club	Fayetteville, New York
1976	Ed Kroll	Lafayette Golf & Country Club	Jamesville, New York
1975	Tony LaPorte	Lafayette Golf & Country Club	Jamesville, New York
1974	Jerry Steelsmith	Beaver Meadows Golf Club	Phoenix, New York
1973	Jerry Steelsmith	Teugega Country Club	Rome, New York
1972	Jerry Steelsmith	Bellevue Country Club	Syracuse, New York
1971	Al Morley	Skaneateles Country Club	Skaneateles, New York
1970	Jim McCoy	Lake Shore Yacht & Country Club	Cicero, New York
1969	Ed Kroll		
1968	Ray Ziats		
1967	No tournament		
1966	Al Morley		
1965	Al Morley	Lafayette Country Club	Onondaga, New York
1964	Al Morley	Cornell Golf Club	Ithaca, New York
1963	Red LaVergne	Cornell Golf Club	Ithaca, New York
