= Jimmy Green (golfer) =

American professional golfer (born 1969)

Personal information
- Nationality: United States
- Born: August 6, 1969 (age 57) Meridian, Mississippi, U.S.
- Height: 5 ft 10 in (1.78 m)
- Weight: 155 lb (70 kg; 11.1 st)
- Spouse: Kelley Sullins Green
- Children: 3

Career
- Sport: Golf
- College: Auburn University
- Turned professional: 1992
- Former tours: PGA Tour; Nationwide Tour; Hooters Jordan Tour
- Professional wins: 2

Number of wins by tour
- Korn Ferry Tour: 1
- Other: 1

Best results in major championships
- Masters Tournament: DNP
- PGA Championship: DNP
- U.S. Open: T57: 2000
- The Open Championship: CUT: 2004

Jimmy Green (born August 6, 1969) is an American professional golfer.

== Career ==
In 1969, Green was born in Meridian, Mississippi. He played college golf at Auburn University, where he won six events including the 1991 Southeastern Conference Championship.

In 1992, Green turned professional. In 1996 and 1998, Green played on the Nike Tour, winning the 1996 Nike Buffalo Open. He played on the PGA Tour in 1997 and 1999–2001. His best finish was T-4 at the 2000 AT&T Pebble Beach National Pro-Am.

Green is currently the General Manager at the Auburn University Club in Auburn, Alabama.

== Amateur wins ==
- 1991 Southeastern Conference Championship

== Professional wins (2) ==
=== Nike Tour wins (1) ===
No.	Date	Tournament	Winning score	Margin of victory	Runner-up
1	Jul 14, 1996	Nike Buffalo Open	−12 (68-71-70-67=276)	Playoff	(United States) Jeff Gove

Nike Tour playoff record (1–0)

No.	Year	Tournament	Opponent	Result
1	1996	Nike Buffalo Open	(United States) Jeff Gove	Won with par on first extra hole

=== Hooters Jordan Tour wins (1) ===
No.	Date	Tournament	Winning score	Margin of victory	Runner-up
1	May 22, 1994	Coca-Cola Classic	−14 (66-70-71-67=274)	1 stroke	(United States) Mike Swartz

== Results in major championships ==
Tournament	1994	1995	1996	1997	1998	1999	2000	2001	2002	2003	2004
U.S. Open	CUT			74	CUT		T57				CUT
The Open Championship											CUT

Note: Green never played in the Masters Tournament nor the PGA Championship.

Did not play

CUT = missed the half-way cut
"T" = tied

== See also ==
- 1996 PGA Tour Qualifying School graduates
- 1998 Nike Tour graduates
- 1999 PGA Tour Qualifying School graduates
