= Jeff Coston =

American professional golfer (born 1955)

Personal information
- Nationality: United States
- Born: October 15, 1955 (age 71) Seattle, Washington, U.S.
- Height: 6 ft 1 in (1.85 m)
- Weight: 155 lb (70 kg; 11.1 st)

Career
- Sport: Golf
- College: Seattle University
- Turned professional: 1977
- Former tours: PGA Tour; Ben Hogan Tour; U.S. Golf Tour; Champions Tour
- Professional wins: 59

Number of wins by tour
- Korn Ferry Tour: 1
- Other: 58

Best results in major championships
- Masters Tournament: DNP
- PGA Championship: 72nd: 2004
- U.S. Open: T53: 2000
- The Open Championship: DNP

Jeff Coston (born October 15, 1955) is an American professional golfer.

== Early life ==
In 1965, Coston attended a PGA Tour event near his hometown, the Greater Seattle Open Invitational at Inglewood Country Club. Upon observing Jack Nicklaus at the event, he realized he wanted to become a professional golfer.

== Professional career ==
In 1985, he joined the PGA Tour. Coston played on the PGA Tour in 1985 and 1988. His best finish was a tied for seventh at the 1988 Anheuser-Busch Golf Classic. From 1991 to 1994, he played on the Ben Hogan Tour, winning once, at the 1991 Ben Hogan Shreveport Open.

Coston runs the Jeff Coston Academy, located at the Semiahmoo Resort near Blaine, Washington, opened in 1994. In 2000 he qualified for the U.S. Open, finishing 53rd.

=== Senior career ===
Coston has had much success in local senior tournaments. He is the most prolific winner of the Pacific Northwest Senior PGA Championship in modern times, having won the championship every year between 2006 and 2011. He has also won the Washington Senior Open every year between 2006 and 2010.

Coston qualified for the 2015 Champions Tour by finishing third at qualifying school in 2014.

== Awards and honors ==
- Coston was Pacific Northwest Player of the Year twelve times: in 1995, 1996, 1997, 1999, 2000, 2001, 2002, 2003, 2004, 2006, 2007, and 2010.
- Coston was PGA Senior Player of the Year five years consecutively from 2006 to 2010.

== Amateur wins ==
this list may be incomplete

- 1977 Pacific Northwest Amateur

== Professional wins (59) ==
=== Ben Hogan Tour wins (1) ===
No.	Date	Tournament	Winning score	Margin of victory	Runner-up
1	Mar 10, 1991	Ben Hogan Shreveport Open	−6 (66-74-70=210)	Playoff	(United States) Beau Baugh

Ben Hogan Tour playoff record (1–1)

No.	Year	Tournament	Opponent	Result
1	1991	Ben Hogan Shreveport Open	(United States) Beau Baugh	Won with birdie on fifth extra hole
2	1992	Ben Hogan Tulsa Open	(United States) Steve Lowery	Lost to birdie on second extra hole

=== U.S. Golf Tour wins (2) ===
No.	Date	Tournament	Winning score	Margin of victory	Runner(s)-up
1	May 20, 1990	Triangle Classic	−14 (64-65-66-71=266)	2 strokes	(United States) Ty Armstrong, (United States) Lan Gooch
2	Jul 29, 1990	Shriners Classic	−18 (62-65-66-69=262)	1 stroke	(United States) Hugh Royer III

=== Other mini-tour wins (6) ===
- 1986 Hillcrest Pro-Am (Dakotas Tour)
- 1989 North Dakota Open (Dakotas Tour)
- 1990 Sharp Chevrolet Pro-Am (Dakotas Tour), Western North Dakota Pro-Am (Dakotas Tour)
- 1991 Hillcrest Pro-Am (Dakotas Tour)
- 1993 Cypress Creek (Space Coast Tour)

=== Other regular wins (23) ===
- 1983 Hillcrest Pro-Am
- 1995 Oregon Open
- 1996 Washington Open
- 1997 Rosaurs Spokane Open, Pacific Northwest PGA Championship
- 1999 Washington Open, Pacific Northwest PGA Championship
- 2000 Pacific Northwest PGA Championship
- 2001 Washington Open, Northwest Open
- 2002 Pacific Northwest PGA Championship
- 2003 Pacific Northwest PGA Championship
- 2004 Oregon Open
- 2006 Rosaurs Spokane Open, Guisti Memorial
- 2007 Northwest Open
- 2008 Rosaurs Spokane Open
- 2009 Pacific Northwest PGA Championship
- 2010 Washington Open, Pacific Northwest PGA Championship
- 2016 Washington Open
- 2021 Washington Open
- 2022 Pacific Northwest PGA Championship

=== Senior wins (27) ===
- 2006 Washington Senior Open, Pacific Northwest Senior PGA Championship
- 2007 Oregon Senior Open, Washington Senior Open, Pacific Northwest Senior PGA Championship
- 2008 Washington Senior Open, Pacific Northwest Senior PGA Championship
- 2009 Oregon Senior Open, Washington Senior Open, Pacific Northwest Senior PGA Championship
- 2010 Washington Senior Open, Pacific Northwest Senior PGA Championship
- 2011 Pacific Northwest Senior PGA Championship, Oregon Senior Open
- 2012 Oregon Senior Open
- 2013 Pacific Northwest Senior PGA Championship
- 2017 Oregon Senior Open
- 2018 Oregon Senior Open, PNW Senior Players Championship
- 2019 Oregon Senior Open
- 2020 Oregon Senior Open, Pacific Northwest Senior PGA Championship
- 2021 Washington Senior Open, Oregon Senior Open
- 2022 PNW Senior Players Championship, Washington Senior Open
- 2023 Washington Senior Open

== See also ==
- 1984 PGA Tour Qualifying School graduates
- 1987 PGA Tour Qualifying School graduates
