= Bill Porter (golfer) =

American professional golfer (born 1959)

Personal information
- Full name: Bill G. Porter
- Nationality: United States
- Born: September 18, 1959 (age 67) Moses Lake, Washington, U.S.
- Height: 6 ft 3 in (1.91 m)
- Weight: 205 lb (93 kg; 14.6 st)
- Spouse: Liz Porter
- Children: 4

Career
- Sport: Golf
- College: University of Oregon
- Turned professional: 1980
- Former tours: PGA Tour; Nationwide Tour
- Professional wins: 9

Number of wins by tour
- Korn Ferry Tour: 1
- Other: 8

Best results in major championships
- Masters Tournament: DNP
- PGA Championship: WD: 2002
- U.S. Open: T36: 1995
- The Open Championship: DNP

Bill G. Porter (born September 18, 1959) is an American professional golfer.

== Career ==
Porter was born in Moses Lake, Washington. He played one year of college golf at the University of Oregon before turning professional in 1980.

Porter worked as a club pro and played on mini-tours until earning his Ben Hogan Tour card (now Nationwide Tour) in the 1991 Q School. He played on the Nationwide Tour and PGA Tour from 1992 to 1996. On the Nationwide Tour (1992–94, 1996), he won once at the 1994 Nike Louisiana Open. On the PGA Tour (1995), his best finish was T-11 at the Deposit Guaranty Golf Classic. He also won several events in the Pacific Northwest.

Porter has been the head golf professional at The Links at Moses Pointe in Moses Lake since 2003.

== Professional wins (9) ==
=== Nike Tour wins (1) ===
No.	Date	Tournament	Winning score	Margin of victory	Runner-up
1	Mar 27, 1994	Nike Louisiana Open	−12 (68-67-71-70=276)	2 strokes	(United States) Brad Fabel

=== Other wins (8) ===
- 1997 Oregon Open, Northwest Open
- 1998 Oregon Open, Northwest Open
- 2000 Oregon Open, Northwest Open
- 2001 Pacific Northwest PGA Championship
- 2002 Washington Open

== Results in major championships ==
Tournament	1995	1996	1997	1998	1999	2000	2001	2002
U.S. Open	T36	T60	CUT					
PGA Championship								WD

Did not play

CUT = missed the half-way cut
WD = withdrew
"T" = tied
Note: Porter never played in the Masters Tournament or The Open Championship.

== See also ==
- 1994 PGA Tour Qualifying School graduates
