= John Adams (golfer) =

American professional golfer (born 1954)

Personal information
- Nationality: United States
- Born: May 5, 1954 (age 72) Altus, Oklahoma, U.S.
- Height: 6 ft 3 in (1.91 m)

Career
- Sport: Golf
- College: Arizona State
- Turned professional: 1976
- Former tours: PGA Tour; Nationwide Tour

Best results in major championships
- Masters Tournament: CUT: 1994
- PGA Championship: T49: 1995
- U.S. Open: T11: 1993
- The Open Championship: DNP

John Adams (born May 5, 1954) is an American professional golfer.

Adams was born in Altus, Oklahoma and went to college at Arizona State.

Adams finished runner-up on the PGA Tour on two occasions, including a playoff loss to Jay Haas at the 1982 Hall of Fame.

Adams finished tied for 11th at the 1993 U.S. Open, his best major finish.

== Playoff record ==
PGA Tour playoff record (0–1)

| No. | Year | Tournament | Opponent | Result |
|---|---|---|---|---|
| 1 | 1982 | Hall of Fame | (United States) Jay Haas | Lost to par on second extra hole |

== Results in major championships ==
| Tournament | 1980 | 1981 | 1982 | 1983 | 1984 | 1985 | 1986 | 1987 | 1988 | 1989 |
|---|---|---|---|---|---|---|---|---|---|---|
| Masters Tournament | | | | | | | | | | |
| U.S. Open | CUT | CUT | | WD | | | CUT | | | CUT |
| PGA Championship | | | | T55 | CUT | | | | | |

| Tournament | 1990 | 1991 | 1992 | 1993 | 1994 | 1995 | 1996 |
|---|---|---|---|---|---|---|---|
| Masters Tournament | | | | | CUT | | |
| U.S. Open | | 62 | CUT | T11 | CUT | | |
| PGA Championship | | | | 74 | | T49 | T52 |

Note: Adams never played in The Open Championship.

Did not play

CUT = missed the half-way cut
"T" indicates a tie for a place

== See also ==
- 1972 PGA Tour Qualifying School graduates
- 1978 PGA Tour Qualifying School graduates (Spring)
- 1979 PGA Tour Qualifying School graduates (Fall)
- 1985 PGA Tour Qualifying School graduates
- 1988 PGA Tour Qualifying School graduates
- 1994 PGA Tour Qualifying School graduates
