= Washington Open (golf) =

The Washington Open is the Washington state open golf tournament, open to both amateur and professional golfers. It is organized by the Pacific Northwest section of the PGA of America. It has been played annually since 1922 at a variety of courses around the state.

== Winners ==
- 2026 Jeff Gove
- 2025 Conner Robbins
- 2024 Tyler Carlson
- 2023 Blake Snyder
- 2022 Colin Inglis
- 2021 Jeff Coston
- 2020 Colin Inglis
- 2019 Shane Prante
- 2018 Ryan Benzel
- 2017 Drew McCullough (a)
- 2016 Jeff Coston
- 2015 Darren Black
- 2014 John Cassidy
- 2013 Chris Griffin
- 2012 Jeff Gove
- 2011 Tim Feenstra
- 2010 Jeff Coston
- 2009 Brian Thornton
- 2008 Brian Nosler
- 2007 Tim Feenstra
- 2006 Josh Immordino (a)
- 2005 Michael Combs
- 2004 Keith Coleman
- 2003 Todd Erwin
- 2002 Bill Porter
- 2001 Jeff Coston
- 2000 Todd Erwin
- 1999 Jeff Coston
- 1998 Keith Liedes
- 1997 Keith Coleman (a)
- 1996 Jeff Coston
- 1995 Jeff Gove
- 1994 Rick Acton
- 1993 Todd Erwin
- 1992 Todd Erwin
- 1991 Jim Strickland
- 1990 Jim Strickland
- 1989 Brian Mogg
- 1988 Rod Marcum
- 1987 Don Bies
- 1986 Jeff Bloom (a)
- 1985 Mike Gove
- 1984 Chris Mitchell
- 1983 Mike Davis
- 1982 Steve Stull
- 1981 Rick Acton
- 1980 Don Bies
- 1979 Rick Acton
- 1978 Fred Couples (a)
- 1977 Dave Barr
- 1976 Chuck Milne
- 1975 Fred Haney
- 1974 Bill Wakeham
- 1973 Chuck Milne
- 1972 Mike Davis
- 1971 Al Mengert
- 1970 Bob Duden
- 1969 Bob Duden
- 1968 Joe Colello (a)
- 1967 Al Feldman
- 1966 Ken Still
- 1965 Al Mengert
- 1964 Al Mengert
- 1963 Al Mengert
- 1962 Charles Congdon
- 1961 Jerry Fehr (a)
- 1960 Bob Duden
- 1959 Don Bies
- 1958 Tom Everham
- 1957 Don Taylor (a)
- 1956 Eddie Draper (a)
- 1955 Bud Ward
- 1954 Tom Boucher
- 1953 Harold West
- 1952 Charles Congdon
- 1951 Emery Zimmerman
- 1950 Charles Congdon
- 1949 Bud Ward (a)
- 1948 Al Zimmerman
- 1947 Charles Congdon
- 1942-46 no tournament
- 1941 Emery Zimmerman
- 1940 Emery Zimmerman
- 1939 Charles Congdon
- 1938 Bud Ward (a)
- 1937 Ted Longworth
- 1936 Harry Givan (a)
- 1935 Al Zimmerman
- 1934 Emery Zimmerman
- 1933 Ted Longworth
- 1932 Neil Christian
- 1931 Frank Rodia
- 1930 Bert Wilde
- 1929 Frank Rodia
- 1928 Walter Pursey
- 1927 Neil Christian
- 1926 Walter Pursey
- 1925 Neil Christian
- 1924 Davie Black
- 1923 Al Espinosa
- 1922 Al Espinosa

(a) – amateur
