= British Columbia Open =

Golf tournament

Tournament information
- Location: British Columbia, Canada
- Established: 1928
- Tour: Canadian Tour
- Format: Stroke play
- Final year: 1993

Final champion
- (United States) Eric Woods

The British Columbia Open, commonly known as the B. C. Open, was a golf tournament that was held in British Columbia, Canada. It was held annually from 1928 until 1993 except for during the Second World War and 1958, when it was cancelled due to the celebratory British Columbia Centennial Open.

The B. C. Open was a fixture on the Canadian Tour from the tour's foundation, when it was the opening tournament in 1966, until 1993 when the British Columbia Professional Golfers Association decided to discontinue the event. Shortly afterwards, the BC TEL Pacific Open was founded as a replacement event on the tour.

At various times the B. C. Open was played over 36, 54 and 72 holes, often differing from one year to the next.

== Winners ==
| Year | Venue | Winner | Score | Ref |
Xerox B.C. Open
| 1994 | Predator Ridge | Tournament cancelled | | |
| 1993 | Predator Ridge | (United States) Eric Woods | 278 (−14) | |
| 1992 | Point Grey | (United States) Perry Parker | 274 (−10) | |
| 1991 | Point Grey | (United States) Guy Boros | 274 (−10) | |
Canadian Airlines–George Williams B.C. Open
| 1990 | Vancouver | (United States) Brandt Jobe | 203 (−13) (Note: Final round washed out.) | |
| 1989 | Point Grey | (Canada) Jim Rutledge | 268 (−16) | |
| 1988 | Point Grey | (United States) David Delong | 207 (−6) | |
George Williams B.C. Open
| 1987 | Point Grey | (United States) Jim Benepe | 204 (−9) | |
| 1986 | Point Grey | (United States) Jim Hallet | 205 (−8) | |
| 1985 | Point Grey | (Canada) Rick Gibson | 208 (−5) (Note: Gibson won after a playoff.) | |
| 1984 | Point Grey | (Canada) Sandy Harper | 271 (−17) | |
British Columbia Open
| 1983 | Point Grey | (Canada) Jim Nelford | 207 (−9) | |
| 1982 | Point Grey | (Canada) Richard Zokol | 203 (−13) | |
| 1981 | Chilliwack | (Canada) Jim Rutledge | 200 (−13) | |
| 1980 | Glen Meadows | (United States) Don Bies | 275 (−13) | |
| 1979 | Glen Meadows | (Canada) Jim Rutledge | 210 (−6) | |
| 1978 | Prince George | (Canada) Dave Barr | 205 (−8) | |
| 1977 | Marine Drive | (Canada) Dave Barr | 205 (−8) | |
| 1976 | Quilchena | (Canada) Cec Ferguson (am) | 206 (−10) | |
| 1975 | Quilchena | (Canada) Dave Barr | 211 (−5) | |
| 1974 | Point Grey | (United States) Jim Barker | 212 (−4) | |
| 1973 | Richmond | (Canada) Gary Bowerman | 213 (−3) (Note: Bowerman won after a playoff.) | |
| 1972 | Vancouver | (United States) Terry Small | 206 (−10) | |
| 1971 | Marine Drive | (Canada) Wayne Vollmer | 206 (−7) | |
| 1970 | Richmond | (United States) Brian Allin | 209 (−7) | |
| 1969 | Shaughnessy | (Canada) Bill Wakeham | 203 (−7) | |
| 1968 | Gorge Vale | (Canada) Bill Wakeham | 209 (−7) | |
| 1967 | Marine Drive | (Canada) John Johnston (am) | 200 (−13) | |
| 1966 | Point Grey | (United States) Al Feldman | 209 (−7) | |
| 1965 | Vancouver | (United States) Al Mengert | 203 (−13) | |
| 1964 | Vancouver | (United States) Ken Still | 208 (−8) | |
| 1963 | Point Grey | (United States) Al Feldman | 210 (−6) (Note: Feldman won after a playoff.) | |
| 1962 | Shaughnessy | (Canada) Stan Leonard | 290 (+2) (Note: Leonard won after a playoff.) | |
| 1961 | Chilliwack | (United States) Bob Duden | 207 (−3) (Note: Duden won after a playoff.) | |
| 1960 | Marine Drive | (United States) Bob Duden | 268 (−16) | |
| 1959 | Point Grey | (Canada) Lyle Crawford | 215 (−1) | |
British Columbia Centennial Open
| 1958 | Point Grey | (United States) Jim Ferree | 270 (−18) | |
British Columbia Open
| 1957 | Vancouver | (Canada) William Mawhinney | 140 (−4) | |
| 1956 | Point Grey | (United States) Chuck Congdon | 139 (−5) (Note: Congdon won after a playoff.) | |
| 1955 | Shaughnessy | (United States) Dow Finsterwald | 270 (−18) | |
| 1954 | Quilchena | (Canada) Stan Leonard | 210 (−3) (Note: Leonard won after an extended playoff against Chuck Congdon, Johnny Langford and Doug Bajus. Congdon and Bajus were eliminated after the first 18-hole playoff, but Leonard and Langford still remained tied after one extra sudden-death hole when darkness fell. A second 18-hole playoff was then held the following week, in which Leonard prevailed with a 68 to Langford's 71.) | |
| 1953 | Quilchena | (United States) Chuck Congdon | 271 (−13) | |
| 1952 | Shaughnessy | (United States) Chuck Congdon | 276 (−12) | |
| 1951 | Rossland-Trail | (United States) Chuck Congdon | 278 (−10) | |
| 1950 | Marine Drive | (Canada) Stan Leonard | 278 (−6) | |
| 1949 | Point Grey | (Canada) Stan Leonard | 271 (−13) | |
| 1948 | Shaughnessy | (United States) Chuck Congdon | 280 (−8) | |
| 1947 | Capilano | (Canada) Stan Leonard | 277 (−11) | |
| 1946 | Uplands | (United States) Chuck Congdon | 272 (−8) | |
| 1940–45 | Not held due to World War II | | | |
| 1939 | Point Grey | (Canada) Fred Wood | 292 (+8) | |
| 1938 | Shaughnessy | (Canada) Fred Wood | 277 (−11) | |
| 1937 | Oak Bay | (Canada) Jimmy Todd (am) | 273 (−3) | |
| 1936 | Marine Drive | (Canada) Russ Case (am) | 277 (−7) | |
| 1935 | Quilchena | (Canada) Fred Wood | 285 (+1) | |
| 1934 | Royal Colwood | (Canada) Don Sutherland | 291 | |
| 1933 | Vancouver | (Canada) Phil Taylor | 283 (−5) | |
| 1932 | Jericho | (Canada) Ken Black (am) | 286 (−2) | |
| 1931 | Uplands | (Canada) Phil Taylor | 284 (E) | |
| 1930 | Point Grey | (Canada) Davie Black | 279 (−5) | |
| 1929 | Oak Bay | (Canada) Phil Taylor | 278 | |
| 1928 | Shaughnessy | (Canada) Davie Black | 292 (+4) | |
