= Tom McGinnis =

American professional golfer

Personal information
- Full name: Thomas McGinnis
- Nationality: United States
- Born: November 27, 1947 Memphis, Tennessee, U.S.
- Died: June 6, 2019 (aged 71) Summerville, South Carolina, U.S.

Career
- Sport: Golf
- College: University of Tennessee
- Turned professional: 1969
- Former tours: PGA Tour; Champions Tour
- Professional wins: 6

Number of wins by tour
- PGA Tour Champions: 1
- Other: 5

Best results in major championships
- Masters Tournament: DNP
- PGA Championship: DNP
- U.S. Open: 55th: 1980
- The Open Championship: DNP

Thomas "Tom or Tommy" McGinnis (November 27, 1947 – June 6, 2019) was an American professional golfer who played on the PGA Tour and the Champions Tour.

== Career ==
McGinnis was born in Memphis, Tennessee. He attended the University of Tennessee and was a member of the golf team from 1967 to 1969. In 1969, McGinnis turned professional.

McGinnis had 49 starts in PGA Tour events during his regular career; he earned and lost his Tour card 3 times. His best finish in a PGA Tour event was a solo 5th at the 1976 Ed McMahon-Jaycees Quad Cities Open. His best finish in a major championship was 55th at the 1980 U.S. Open. He earned his living primarily as a club and teaching pro at various clubs in Tennessee, New York, and Florida.

McGinnis has eight top-10 finishes in Champions Tour events, including one win. The highlight of his career was defeating Hale Irwin in a playoff at the 1999 BankBoston Classic. With his win, McGinnis deprived Irwin of the chance to match Chi-Chi Rodríguez's record of three straight titles in this event.

McGinnis worked as a teaching pro at Pine Forest Country Club in Summerville, South Carolina. He was also an assistant coach for the boy's varsity golf team at Pinewood Preparatory School, the South Carolina 2006 Class AAA champions.

== Personal life ==
McGinnis died on June 6, 2019, in Summerville, South Carolina.

== Amateur wins ==
- 1965 Tennessee Junior Amateur, International Jaycee Junior Golf Tournament
- 1969 Memphis City Amateur

== Professional wins (6) ==
=== Regular career wins (5) ===
- 1971 Saskatchewan Open, Willow Park Classic (Canada)
- 1986 New York State Open
- 1996 Long Island PGA Championship, Long Island Open

=== Champions Tour wins (1) ===
No.	Date	Tournament	Winning score	Margin of victory	Runner-up
1	Aug 27, 1999	BankBoston Classic	−11 (69-69-67=205)	Playoff	(United States) Hale Irwin

Champions Tour playoff record (1–0)

No.	Year	Tournament	Opponent	Result
1	1999	BankBoston Classic	(United States) Hale Irwin	Won with birdie on second extra hole

== See also ==
- 1972 PGA Tour Qualifying School graduates
- Fall 1975 PGA Tour Qualifying School graduates
- Fall 1978 PGA Tour Qualifying School graduates
