= MasterCard Classic (Champions Tour) =

The MasterCard Classic was a golf tournament on the Champions Tour from 2000 to 2004. It was played in late February/early March in Mexico, first in Puebla for two years and then in the Mexico City area. It was the first Champions Tour event in Mexico.

The purse for the 2004 tournament was US$2,000,000, with $300,000 going to the winner. The tournament was founded in 2000 as the Audi Senior Classic.

== Winners ==
- 2004 Ed Fiori
- 2003 David Eger

Audi Senior Classic

- 2002 Bruce Lietzke

Mexico Senior Classic

- 2001 Mike McCullough

Audi Senior Classic

- 2000 Hubert Green

== See also ==
- MasterCard Classic - an LPGA Tour event in Mexico
