= Pacific Northwest PGA Championship =

The Pacific Northwest PGA Championship is a golf tournament that is the championship of the Pacific Northwest section of the PGA of America, which includes Oregon, Washington, northern Idaho, western Montana, and Alaska. The tournament began 92 years ago in 1934 and has been played annually.

Jeff Coston, who played on the PGA Tour in the 1980s, holds the record with seven Pacific Northwest PGA victories from 1997 to 2010. PGA Tour winners who have also won the Pacific Northwest PGA Championship include Ed "Porky" Oliver (eight-time PGA tour winner), Charles Congdon (two-time PGA tour winner), Pat Fitzsimons, and Don Bies.

== Winners ==
Year	Champion	Venue	City	State	Notes
2025	Scott Erdmann	Astoria Golf and Country Club	Warrenton	Oregon	
2025	Austin Hurt (2)	Canyon River Golf Club	Missoula	Montana	
2024	Brady Sharp	Everett Golf and Country Club	Everett	Washington	
2023	Austin Hurt	Tumble Creek Club	Cle Elum	Washington	
2022	Jeff Coston (8)	Manito Golf and Country Club	Spokane	Washington	
2021	Colin Inglis	Arrowhead Golf Club	Molalla	Oregon	
2020	Bo Baker	Canyon River Golf Club	Missoula	Montana	
2019	Corey Prugh	Indian Summer Golf and Country Club	Olympia	Washington	
2018	Russell Grove	Meadow Springs Country Club	Richland	Washington	
2017	Russell Grove	Meridian Valley Country Club	Kent	Washington	
2016	Corey Prugh	Astoria Golf and Country Club	Warrenton	Oregon	
2015	Tim Feenstra (3)	Canyon River Golf Club	Missoula	Montana	
2014	Brian Thornton (2)	Salish Cliffs Golf Club	Shelton	Washington	
2013	Tim Feenstra (2)	Meadow Springs Country Club	Richland	Washington	
2012	Ryan Benzel	Circling Raven Golf Club	Worley	Idaho	
2011	Tim Feenstra	Illahe Hills Country Club	Salem	Oregon	
2010	Jeff Coston (7)	Canyon River Golf Club	Missoula	Montana	
2009	Jeff Coston (6)	Avalon Golf Links	Burlington	Washington	
2008	Chris van der Velde	Tetherow Golf Club	Bend	Oregon	
2007	Brian Thornton	Suncadia Resort - Prospector Course	Cle Elum	Washington	
2006	Ryan Malby	Circling Raven Golf Club	Worley	Idaho	
2005	Keith Coleman	Whitefish Lake Golf Club	Whitefish	Montana	
2004	Tom Sovay	Aspen Lakes Golf Club	Sisters	Oregon	
2003	Jeff Coston (5)	Spokane Country Club	Fairwood	Washington	
2002	Jeff Coston (4)	Meadow Springs Country Club	Richland	Washington	
2001	Bill Porter	Indian Summer Golf and Country Club	Olympia	Washington	
2000	Jeff Coston (3)	Northern Pines Golf Club	Kalispell	Montana	
1999	Jeff Coston (2)	Illahe Hills Country Club	Salem	Oregon	
1998	Scott Krieger	Walla Walla Country Club	Walla Walla	Washington	
1997	Jeff Coston	Spokane Country Club	Fairwood	Washington	
1996	Mike Davis	Tacoma Country & Golf Club	Lakewood	Washington	
1995	Randy Jensen	Eagle Bend Golf Club	Bigfork	Montana	
1994	Jeff Fought	Portland Golf Club	Portland	Oregon	
1993	Tom Carey	Walla Walla Country Club	Walla Walla	Washington	
1992	Mike Gove	Sun Willows Golf Club	Pasco	Washington	
1991	Mark Keating	Sudden Valley Golf Club	Bellingham	Washington	
1990	Scott Williams	Bend Golf and Country Club	Bend	Oregon	
1989	Rob Gibbons	Port Ludlow Golf and Country Club	Port Ludlow	Washington	
1988	Mark Gardner	Eugene Country Club	Eugene	Oregon	
1987	Doug Campbell (2)	Canyon Lakes Golf Club	Kennewick	Washington	
1986	Jim Von Lossow	Olympia Country & Golf Club	Olympia	Washington	
1985	Pat Fitzsimons (3)	Canyon Lakes Golf Club	Kennewick	Washington	
1984	Pat Welch	Canyon Lakes Golf Club	Kennewick	Washington	
1983	Pat Fitzsimons (2)	Meadow Springs Country Club	Richland	Washington	
1982	Rick Acton (4)	Tumwater Valley Golf Club	Tumwater	Washington	
1981	Doug Campbell	Meadow Springs Country Club	Richland	Washington	
1980	Rick Acton (3)	Meadow Springs Country Club	Richland	Washington	
1979	Fred Haney	Meadow Springs Country Club	Richland	Washington	
1978	Mike Davis	Meadow Springs Country Club	Richland	Washington	
1977	Rick Acton (2)	Meadow Springs Country Club	Richland	Washington	
1976	Pat Fitzsimons	Meadow Springs Country Club	Richland	Washington	
1975	Rick Acton	Meadow Springs Country Club	Richland	Washington	
1974	Jerry Mowlds	Sahalee Country Club	Sammamish ^	Washington	
1973	Harvey Hixson	Eugene Country Club	Eugene	Oregon	
1972	Bob Ellsworth	Sahalee Country Club	Sammamish ^	Washington	
1971	Ted Denham	Royal Oaks Country Club	Vancouver	Washington	
1970	Bob Duden (3)	Broadmoor Golf Club	Seattle	Washington	
1969	Al Mengert (2)	Illahe Hills Country Club	Salem	Oregon	
1968	Al Mengert	Manito Golf and Country Club	Spokane	Washington	
1967	Don Bies	Broadmoor Golf Club	Seattle	Washington	
1966	Bob Duden (2)	Shadow Hills Country Club	Junction City	Oregon	
1965	Jim Peterson (2)	Glendale Country Club	Bellevue	Washington	
1964	Tom Marlowe	Portland Golf Club	Portland	Oregon	
1963	Charles Congdon (6)	Walla Walla Country Club	Walla Walla	Washington	
1962	Jim Peterson	Tacoma Country & Golf Club	Lakewood	Washington	
1961	Bob Duden	Oswego Lake Country Club	Lake Oswego	Oregon	
1960	Joe Greer (5)	Walla Walla Country Club	Walla Walla	Washington	
1959	Joe Greer (4)	Fircrest Country Club	Fircrest	Washington	
1958	Ed Oldfield	Royal Oaks Country Club	Vancouver	Washington	
1957	Eddie Hogan (2)	Manito Golf and Country Club	Spokane	Washington	
1956	Joe Greer (3)	Overlake Golf & Country Club	Medina	Washington	
1955	Eddie Hogan	Waverley Country Club	Portland	Oregon	
1954	Joe Greer (2)	Yakima Country Club	Yakima	Washington	
1953	Joe Greer	Seattle Golf Club	Seattle	Washington	
1952	Charles Congdon (5)	Alderwood Country Club	Portland	Oregon	
1951	Dave Killen	Manito Golf and Country Club	Spokane	Washington	
1950	Charles Congdon (4)	Inglewood Golf Club	Kenomre	Washington	
1949	Emery Zimmerman (2)	Tualatin Country Club	Tualatin	Oregon	
1948	Ed "Porky" Oliver	Spokane Country Club	Fairwood	Washington	
1947	Charles Congdon (3)	Tacoma Country & Golf Club	Lakewood	Washington	
1946	Emery Zimmerman	Tacoma Country & Golf Club	Lakewood	Washington	
1945	Joe Mozel	Portland Golf Club	Portland	Oregon	
1944	Gordon Richards	Fircrest Golf Club	Fircrest	Washington	
1943	No record				
1942	Al Zimmerman (3)	Fircrest Golf Club	Fircrest	Washington	
1941	Al Zimmerman (2)	Waverley Country Club	Portland	Oregon	
1940	Al Zimmerman	Tacoma Country & Golf Club	Lakewood	Washington	
1939	Ken Tucker	Tacoma Country & Golf Club	Lakewood	Washington	
1938	Charles Congdon (2)	Tacoma Country & Golf Club	Lakewood	Washington	
1937	Ted Longworth	Fircrest Golf Club	Fircrest	Washington	
1936	Charles Congdon	Alderwood Country Club	Portland	Oregon	
1935	Walter Pursey	Inglewood Golf Club	Kenmore	Washington	
1934	Verne Torfin	Fircrest Golf Club	Fircrest	Washington	

^ Prior to 1999, Sahalee Country Club (1972, 1974) was in unincorporated King County, with a Redmond address.
