= Oregon Open =

Golf tournament in Oregon, US

Tournament information
- Location: Oregon
- Established: 1905

Current champion
- Ryan Benzel

The Oregon Open is the Oregon state open golf tournament, open to both amateur and professional golfers. It is organized by the Pacific Northwest section of the PGA of America. The tournament was first played in 1905 and has been played annually (with minor disruptions) since 1925 at a variety of courses around the state. It was considered a PGA Tour event in the late 1920s and early 1930s.

== Winners ==
- 2026 Daniel Campbell
- 2025 Jamie Hall
- 2024 Russell Grove
- 2023 Shane Prante
- 2022 Jeff Gove
- 2021 Kennedy Swann (a)
- 2020 Brady Sharp
- 2019 Reid Hatley (a)
- 2018 Colin Inglis
- 2017 Russell Grove
- 2016 Ryan Benzel
- 2015 David Lebeck
- 2014 Derek Barron
- 2013 Hans Reimiers (a)
- 2012 Brian Thornton
- 2011 Reid Martin (a)
- 2010 Derek Berg (a)
- 2009 Brian Nosler
- 2008 Corey Prugh
- 2007 Josh Immordino
- 2006 Scott Krieger
- 2005 Erik Hanson (a)
- 2004 Jeff Coston
- 2003 Tracy Vest
- 2002 Darek Franklin
- 2001 Ken Bensel
- 2000 Bill Porter
- 1999 Michael Combs
- 1998 Bill Porter
- 1997 Bill Porter
- 1996 Dan Koesters
- 1995 Jeff Coston
- 1994 Bill Tindall
- 1993 John McComish
- 1992 Mike Gove
- 1991 Doug Doxsie
- 1990 Pat Fitzsimons
- 1989 Tim Hval (a)
- 1988 Greg Whisman
- 1987 Jim Strickland (a)
- 1986 Doug Campbell
- 1985 Rick Acton
- 1984 Mike Davis
- 1983 Scott Taylor (a)
- 1982 Walt Porterfield, Jr.
- 1981 Mike Warner (a)
- 1980 Doug Campbell
- 1979 Peter Jacobsen
- 1978 Rick Acton
- 1977 Rick Acton
- 1976 Peter Jacobsen (a)
- 1975 Craig Griswold
- 1974 Gene Edstrom (a)
- 1973 Bob Duden
- 1972 Rick Acton
- 1971 Ted Denham
- 1970 Bob Duden
- 1969 Bob Duden
- 1968 Pat Fitzsimons (a)
- 1967 Bob Duden
- 1966 Al Feldman
- 1965 Mike Dudik
- 1964 Jerry Mowlds
- 1963 Glenn Spivey
- 1962 Bob Duden
- 1961 Bill Eggers
- 1960 Bill Eggers
- 1959 Bob Duden
- 1958 Dick Yost (a)
- 1957 Oscar "Ockie" Eliason
- 1956 Gene "Bunny" Mason
- 1955 Bruce Cudd (a)
- 1954 Bruce Cudd (a)
- 1953 Bob Duden
- 1952 Bob Duden
- 1951 John Langford, Jr.
- 1950 Harold West
- 1949 Ron Clark (a)
- 1948 Harold West
- 1947 Charles Congdon
- 1946 Lou Jennings (a)
- 1943–1945 No tournament
- 1942 Al Zimmerman
- 1941 Bob Litton
- 1937–1940 No tournament
- 1936 Ray Mangrum
- 1935 No tournament
- 1934 Ted Longworth
- 1933 Al Zimmerman
- 1931–1932 No tournament
- 1930 Leo Diegel
- 1929 Horton Smith
- 1928 Oscar Willing (a)
- 1927 Tommy Armour
- 1926 No tournament
- 1925 Bert Wilde
- 1906–1924 No tournament
- 1905 George Smith

(a) – amateur
