= Alameda County Open =

Golf tournament formerly on the PGA Tour

Tournament information
- Location: Sunol, California
- Established: 1969
- Course: Sunol Valley Golf Club
- Par: 72
- Length: 7,015 yards (6,415 m)
- Tour: PGA Tour
- Format: Stroke play
- Prize fund: US$50,000
- Month played: January
- Final year: 1969

Tournament record score
- Aggregate: 290 Dick Lotz (1969)
- To par: +2 as above

Final champion
- (United States) Dick Lotz
- Location in the United States Location in California

The Alameda County Open was a golf tournament on the PGA Tour that was held from January 9–12, 1969 at the Sunol Valley Golf Club's Palm course in Sunol, California. The event was won by hometowner Dick Lotz, then 26 years old, by one-stroke over Don Whitt. The winning score was 290 (two-over-par).

== Winners ==
Year	Winner	Score	To par	Margin of victory	Runner-up	Purse ($)	Winner's share ($)
1969	(United States) Dick Lotz	290	+2	1 stroke	(United States) Don Whitt	50,000	10,000
