= Cloverbank Country Club =

Country club in Hamburg, New York

Coordinates: 42°44′28″N 78°52′43″W

Cloverbank Country Club is a private country club in Hamburg, New York. The club offers various activities such as bowling, swimming, tennis, and golf. Prior to 2021, the club operated as the Brierwood Country Club.

== History ==
In 1956, Bethlehem Steel Company acquired 400 acres of land in Hamburg, New York to construct the Bethlehem Management Club. The club was established in 1958 and opened in 1959. Initially, the club was exclusively reserved for Bethlehem Steel employees and their families. The 18 hole, 7,061 yard golf course was designed by course architects William and David Gordon.

E.F. Burke Development purchased the club in 1987, renaming it Brierwood Country Club. In 1997, the club was sold to Arnold Palmer Golf Management, who subsequently sold the property to C-Bons International Golf Group.

Facing reduced membership during the COVID-19 pandemic, Brierwood Country Club was sold in 2021 to an investor group composed of former members. The club was renamed to Cloverbank Country Club.

== Golf course and amenities ==
The Gordon and Gordon designed course is a par 72, currently measuring just over 7,100 yards from the tournament tees. At this yardage, it has received a slope of 132 with an overall course rating of 74 by the United States Golf Association. Much of the course layout remains unchanged from its initial inception. The course is well known for hole number 11, which is a par 3 that plays at 190 yards over a large man-made pond with a fountain, and a green surrounded by sand dunes. It is the third longest of the four par 3's on the course.

In addition to the golf course, Cloverbank Country Club also features a driving range, a junior olympic swimming pool, tennis courts, a bowling alley, and a member-exclusive restaurant.
