= Bill Eggers =

American professional golfer (1932–1994)

Personal information
- Full name: William F. Eggers
- Nationality: United States
- Born: December 27, 1932
- Died: April 25, 1994 (aged 61)

Career
- Sport: Golf
- Status: Professional
- Former tour: PGA Tour
- Professional wins: 3

Best results in major championships
- Masters Tournament: DNP
- PGA Championship: CUT: 1958, 1959, 1960
- U.S. Open: CUT: 1963
- The Open Championship: DNP

William F. Eggers (December 27, 1932 – April 25, 1994) was an American professional golfer who played on the PGA Tour.

== Professional career ==
Eggers played for four years on the PGA Tour in the early 1960s. His best finish in this venue was a solo 2nd at the 1963 Denver Open Invitational, where he lost to Chi-Chi Rodríguez by two strokes.

Eggers was a club professional in the greater Portland, Oregon area for more than 30 years. He served as head professional at Portland's Rose City Golf Club, Gresham Country Club and Charbonneau Golf Club. He played on 15 Hudson Cup teams between 1958 and 1982, and served as captain in 1991 and 1992.

The Pacific Northwest Section PGA recognizes the outstanding senior amateur as determined by a vote of the professional team with The Bill Eggers Award at the conclusion of their annual Hudson Cup tournament.

== Professional wins (3) ==
- 1960 Oregon Open
- 1961 Oregon Open
- 1965 Oregon PGA Championship
