= Dick Lotz =

American professional golfer (born 1942)

Personal information
- Full name: Richard Lotz
- Nationality: United States
- Born: October 15, 1942 (age 84) Oakland, California
- Height: 5 ft 8 in (1.73 m)
- Weight: 175 lb (79 kg; 12.5 st)

Career
- Sport: Golf
- College: San Mateo Junior College
- Turned professional: 1963
- Former tours: PGA Tour; Champions Tour
- Professional wins: 5

Number of wins by tour
- PGA Tour: 3
- Other: 2

Best results in major championships
- Masters Tournament: T18: 1970
- PGA Championship: T8: 1970
- U.S. Open: T24: 1971
- The Open Championship: DNP

Richard Lotz (born October 15, 1942) is an American professional golfer who has played on the PGA Tour and the Senior PGA Tour.

== Early life ==
Lotz was born in Oakland, California. Along with his older brother John, he developed his game under the tutelage of noted black golf instructor Lucius Bateman whose other students included PGA Tour winners Don Whitt, John McMullin, and Tony Lema.

== Amateur career ==
Lotz attended San Mateo Junior College (1962–1963) and was a member of the golf team. He was the individual medalist at the California Community College Championship. He shot a record-breaking 59 in the final round of the 1963 Santa Clara County Golf Championship, which still stands. As an amateur, Lotz captured the 1960 and 1963 Alameda Commuters golf tournament, 1961 and 1962 California State Fair events, the 1962 and 1963 Stanford Invitationals, 1963 Oakland City, 1963 Santa Clara County championship, 1963 Far Western Junior Intercollegiate championship, and most notably, the 1962 California State Amateur.

In 1963, his final year as an amateur, Lotz came within one stroke of becoming the first amateur since Gene Littler in 1954 and Doug Sanders in 1956, to win on the PGA Tour. He was victorious as an amateur that year in a Sectional Stroke Play tournament. Before declaring their intention to turn professional, both Lotz brothers were ranked among the nation's Top Ten Amateurs in 1963 by Golf Digest magazine.

== Professional career ==
In 1963, Lotz turned professional. He played on the PGA Tour from 1964–1978. Among his victories were three official events: the 1969 Alameda Open, the 1970 Kemper Open, and the 1970 Monsanto Open. Among the unofficial professional tournaments Lotz captured were the Chales Schultz Pro-Am Invitational, the 1972 Plantation Classic in North Carolina, the 1985 Northern California PGA Match and Medal championship, and the 1985 Blackhawk Invitational.

Lotz's career year was 1970 when he won twice, finished second at the San Antonio Open Invitational, and earned five other top ten finishes to rank 7th on the year's official money list. That performance earned Lotz Golf Digest's Most Improved Golfer award, along with selection by its editorial panel of experts of those most likely to capture a major in 1971. In similar fashion, Golf Magazine named Lotz to its PGA All-American Team. His best performance in a major also came in 1970 – a T-8 at the PGA Championship.

After reaching the age of 50 in 1992, Lotz joined the Senior PGA Tour. His best finish in this venue was a T-4 at the 1994 Bank of Boston Senior Classic.

== Personal life ==
Lotz lived in Pleasanton, California for much of his adult life, but now lives in El Dorado Hills, California.

== Amateur wins ==
- 1960 Alameda Commuters Championship
- 1961 California State Fair Men's Amateur Championships
- 1962 California State Fair Men's Amateur Championships, Stanford Invitational Golf Championship, California State Amateur
- 1963 Alameda Commuters Championship, Stanford Invitational Golf Championship, Oakland City, Santa Clara County Championship, Far Western Junior Intercollegiate Championship

== Professional wins (5) ==
=== PGA Tour wins (3) ===
No.	Date	Tournament	Winning score	Margin of victory	Runner(s)-up
1	Jan 12, 1969	Alameda County Open	+2 (72-71-74-73=290)	1 stroke	(United States) Don Whitt
2	Mar 15, 1970	Monsanto Open	−9 (68-70-69-68=275)	3 strokes	(United States) Dave Stockton
3	Jun 7, 1970	Kemper Open	−10 (72-66-69-71=278)	2 strokes	(United States) Lou Graham, (United States) Larry Hinson, (United States) Grier Jones, (United States) Tom Weiskopf

=== Other wins (2) ===
- 1966 Northern California Open
- 1985 Northern California PGA Championship
