= UW Medical Center – Northwest =

Coordinates: 47°42′51″N 122°20′13″W

- UW Medicine

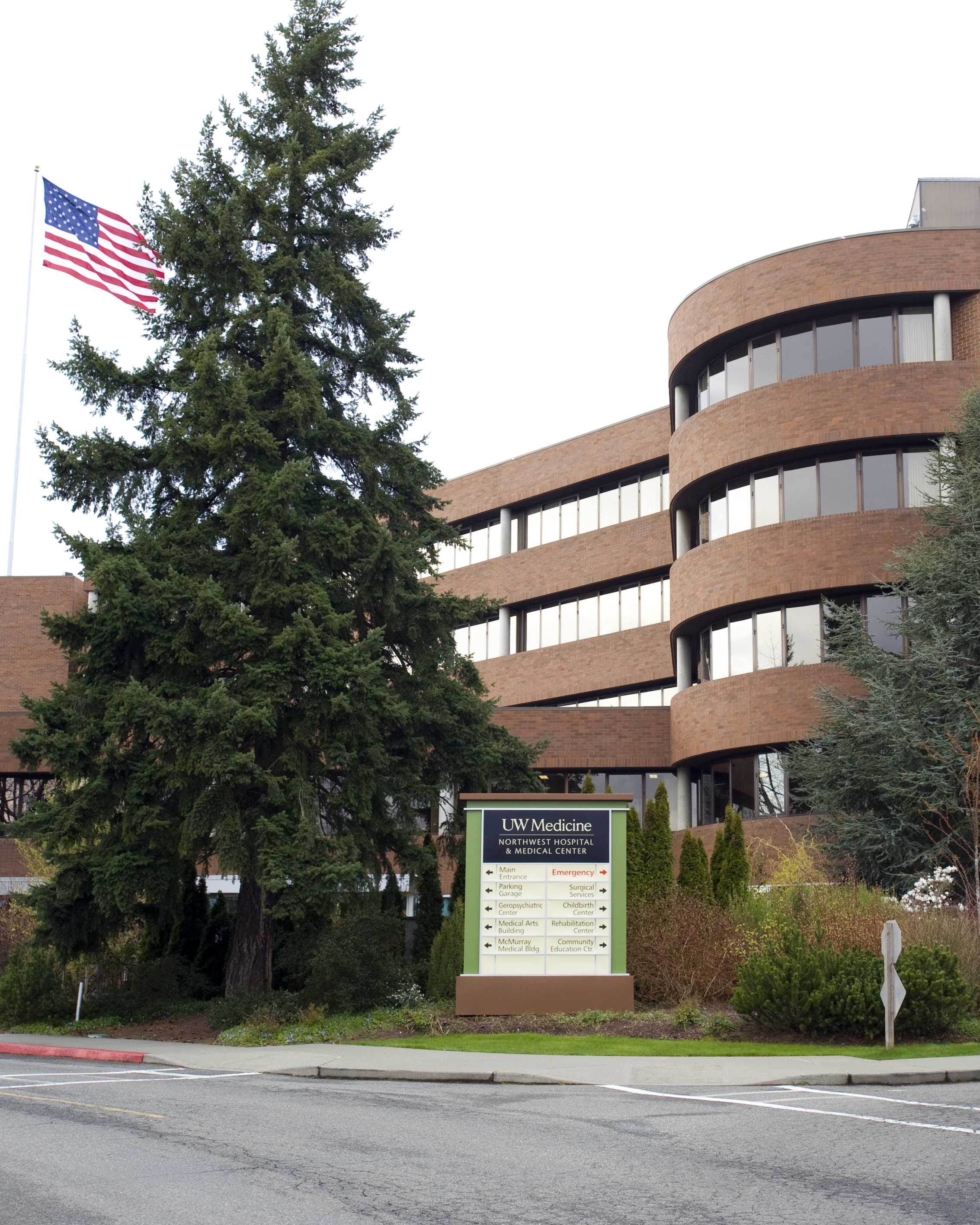
- UW Medical Center – Northwest

- Location within Washington (state)

Geography
- Location: 1550 N 115th Street, Seattle, Washington, United States

Organisation
- Affiliated university: University of Washington

Services
- Emergency department: Level IV trauma center
- Beds: 281

History
- Former name: Northwest Hospital
- Founded: 1960

Links
- Website: uwmedicine.org/northwest
- Other links: List of hospitals in Washington (state)

UW Medical Center – Northwest (formerly Northwest Hospital & Medical Center) is a 281-bed hospital in Seattle, Washington. It was built in 1960 and became part of the UW Medicine system in 2010. Prior to the merger, a 1997 agreement had already made Northwest the home for a UW Medicine cardiac surgery program.

== History ==
In 1949, the "Community Memorial" Hospital Association purchased a 33-acre (13 ha) tract in North Seattle. Northwest Hospital opened in 1960, as the city's northernmost hospital. In 1965 the hospital acquired a radioisotope magna scanner, and over the rest of the 1960s they established a comprehensive rehabilitation program (1967), an inhalation therapy department (1967), a program for hearing disorders (1968), and a stroke center (1969). In 1970, they were the first Seattle hospital with a birth clinic offering the use of a single "birth suite" for labor, delivery, recovery, and postpartum care.

The 1970s saw physical expansion of the emergency department (1973), the opening of a department of nuclear medicine (1971), and the 1977 establishment of the Northwest Hospital Foundation. Physical expansion continued in the 1980s with a new tower building (1983). In 1985, Northwest Hospital physicians pioneered the ultrasound-guided installation of a radioactive "seed" implant to treat prostate cancer. In 1993 they were the region's first hospital to offer the non-surgical gamma knife technique of treating brain tumors.

In the 2000s, the emergency department expanded yet again (2001), and Northwest continued to adopt pioneering technologies such as minimally invasive surgical techniques, DynaCT angiogram technology (2005, another regional first), and robotic surgery (2007). They began to use electronic medical records and bedside medication reconciliation in 2007; that same year they converted to all-digital mammography. A sleep center opened in 2008. In 2011, work began on the region's first proton beam therapy center for cancer treatment. 2009 saw the introduction of hyperbaric oxygen therapy. Physical expansion also continued with the enlargement of the hospital's surgical facility in 2010.

In 2020, Northwest Hospital merged with the University of Washington Medical Center (UWMC). After the UW Medicine merger, Northwest remained a separate nonprofit, tax-exempt entity. The same year, the hospital adopted the new name UW Medical Center – Northwest.

== Healthgrades ratings ==
The Healthgrades website provides much rating information about this hospital. Only two sets of ratings are examined here. This hospital was rated on thirteen patient safety indicators. Northwest Hospital received one worse than average ranking, ten average rankings and two better than average rankings. A number of patient experience measures are presented in Healthgrades, based on post experience surveys filled out by patients. All but two were within a few points of the national average of all patient experience surveys. The exceptions were:

- Room nighttime quiet - 45% of respondents for this hospital vs. 60% nationally
- Patient would definitely recommend this hospital 77% of respondents vs. 70% nationally
