= Jerry Steelsmith =

American professional golfer (1935–2024)

Personal information
- Full name: Jon Jerry Steelsmith
- Nationality: United States
- Born: November 26, 1935 Peoria, Illinois, U.S.
- Died: March 23, 2024 (aged 88)

Career
- Sport: Golf
- College: Glendale College
- Turned professional: 1957
- Former tour: PGA Tour
- Professional wins: 5

Best results in major championships
- Masters Tournament: DNP
- PGA Championship: T48: 1970
- U.S. Open: T29: 1961
- The Open Championship: DNP

Jon Jerry Steelsmith (November 26, 1935 – March 23, 2024) was an American professional golfer.

== Career ==
Steelsmith was born in Peoria, Illinois. A native of Glendale, California, Steelsmith played on the PGA Tour from 1961 to 1968. He finished second five times on the PGA Tour: 1961 Hot Springs Open Invitational, 1962 Azalea Open, 1962 500 Festival Open Invitation, 1963 Frank Sinatra Open Invitational, and 1964 Almaden Open Invitational. Two of his 2nd-place finishes were playoff losses.

He is a former All-Army Champion. He was also captain of the golf team at Glendale College.

Steelsmith died March 23, 2024, after a short illness, at the age of 88.

== Professional wins ==
this list may be incomplete

- 1969 Southern California PGA Championship
- 1972 Central New York PGA Championship
- 1973 Central New York PGA Championship
- 1974 Central New York PGA Championship
- 1978 Central New York PGA Championship

== Playoff record ==
PGA Tour playoff record (0–2)

No.	Year	Tournament	Opponent(s)	Result
1	1962	Azalea Open	(United States) Dave Marr	Lost to birdie on first extra hole
2	1964	Almaden Open Invitational	(United States) Pete Brown, (United States) Billy Casper	Casper won with birdie on third extra hole after 18 hole playoff; Casper: −4 (68), Brown: −4 (68), Steelsmith: +1 (73)
