= Jeff Gove =

American professional golfer (born 1971)

Personal information
- Nationality: United States
- Born: May 28, 1971 (age 55) Seattle, Washington, U.S.
- Height: 6 ft 2 in (1.88 m)
- Weight: 180 lb (82 kg; 13 st)

Career
- Sport: Golf
- College: Pepperdine University
- Turned professional: 1994
- Former tours: PGA Tour; Web.com Tour; Gateway Tour
- Professional wins: 10

Number of wins by tour
- Korn Ferry Tour: 3
- Other: 8

Best results in major championships
- Masters Tournament: DNP
- PGA Championship: DNP
- U.S. Open: CUT: 2004
- The Open Championship: DNP

Jeff Gove (born May 28, 1971) is an American professional golfer. He has played on the PGA Tour.

== Early life and amateur career ==
In 1971, Gove was born in Seattle, Washington. He played college golf at Pepperdine University.

== Professional career ==
In 1994, Gove turned professional. He started his career on the Nike Tour. In 1995, Gove won the Nike Tri-Cities Open. He also won a non-tour event that year, his home state's open, the Washington Open. In 1999, he won on the Nike Tour again, at the Nike Knoxville Open. He finished #12 on the money list. He was one of the 1999 Nike Tour graduates to earn PGA Tour membership. In 2000, Gove did not have much success on the PGA Tour, however, and returned to the developmental tour. In 2001, Gove had success and finished in the top ten on the money list. He was on the 2001 Buy.com Tour graduates list. In 2002, on the PGA Tour, Gove again did not have much success and returned to the developmental tour. In 2004, he played on the Gateway Tour, a minitour. He won two events. In 2005, Gove won the Nationwide Tour's Oregon Classic. He finished in the top 21 on the money list and was one of the 2005 Nationwide Tour graduates.

Gove played on the PGA Tour for the next three seasons, from 2006-2008. His best finishes on the PGA Tour were during this timespan; they were joint sixth places finishes at the 2006 Booz Allen Classic and the 2007 John Deere Classic. In 2007, Gove earned the final spot in the FedEx Cup playoffs by finishing 144th in the points standings. In 2008, however, he played poorly; he returned to the developmental tour. In 2009, he once again played well on the Nationwide Tour, finishing #17 on the money list, and regained PGA Tour membership. However, he returned to the developmental tour in 2010. In 2012, Gove had success at PGA Tour Qualifying School to regain PGA Tour membership. That year he also won his home state's open, the Washington Open, once again that year. In 2013, Gove had his last season on the PGA Tour. He returned to the developmental tour in 2014.

Since then he has played on local events and on the minitours. In 2015, he won the TaylorMade Pebble Beach Invitational. In 2016, he won the Quarles & Brady LLP Classic on the Gateway Tour. In 2022, he won the Oregon Open.

== Professional wins (11) ==
=== Nationwide Tour wins (3) ===
No.	Date	Tournament	Winning score	Margin of victory	Runner(s)-up
1	Sep 17, 1995	Nike Tri-Cities Open	−14 (65-68-69=202)	Playoff	(United States) Franklin Langham
2	May 23, 1999	Nike Knoxville Open	−11 (69-69-68-71=277)	1 stroke	(United States) Marco Dawson, (Canada) Glen Hnatiuk, (United States) Carl Paulson
3	Oct 2, 2005	Oregon Classic	−15 (66-68-67=201) (Note: Shortened to 54 holes due to weather.)	3 strokes	(United States) Jamie Broce, (United States) Kris Cox, (Mexico) Esteban Toledo, (New Zealand) Tim Wilkinson

Nationwide Tour playoff record (1–2)

No.	Year	Tournament	Opponent(s)	Result
1	1995	Nike Tri-Cities Open	(United States) Franklin Langham	Won with birdie on second extra hole
2	1996	Nike Buffalo Open	(United States) Jimmy Green	Lost to par on first extra hole
3	2004	Permian Basin Charity Golf Classic	(United States) Charley Hoffman, (South Africa) Craig Lile	Hoffman won with birdie on third extra hole

=== Gateway Tour wins (3) ===
No.	Date	Tournament	Winning score	Margin of victory	Runner-up
1	Feb 26, 2004	Steele Canyon Classic	−6 (65-71-71=207)	1 stroke	(United States) Jerry Smith
2	Mar 11, 2004	Auld Classic	−18 (69-66-67-68=270)	1 stroke	(United States) Brian Smock
3	Feb 10, 2016	Quarles & Brady LLP Classic	−7 (71-69-69=207)	1 stroke	(United States) Doug Quinones

=== Other wins (5) ===
- 1995 Washington Open
- 2012 Washington Open
- 2015 TaylorMade Pebble Beach Invitational
- 2022 Oregon Open
- 2026 Washington Open

== Results in major championships ==
Tournament	2004
U.S. Open	CUT

CUT = missed the halfway cut
Note: Gove only played in the U.S. Open.

== See also ==
- 1999 Nike Tour graduates
- 2001 Buy.com Tour graduates
- 2005 Nationwide Tour graduates
- 2009 Nationwide Tour graduates
- 2012 PGA Tour Qualifying School graduates
