= Bob Duden =

American golfer

Personal information
- Full name: Robert W. Duden
- Nationality: United States
- Born: September 5, 1920
- Died: March 22, 1995 (aged 74)

Career
- Sport: Golf
- Status: Professional
- Former tour: PGA Tour
- Professional wins: 30

Best results in major championships
- Masters Tournament: DNP
- PGA Championship: T54: 1977
- U.S. Open: T46: 1954
- The Open Championship: DNP

Robert W. Duden (September 5, 1920 – March 22, 1995) was an American professional golfer who played on the PGA Tour in the 1950s and 1960s.

== Career ==
A lifelong resident of Portland, Oregon, Duden compiled a remarkable record in sectional golf competition. He won over fifty tournaments in a 40-year career that included 23 Pacific Northwest Section events. These include a record seven wins of the Pacific Northwest Senior PGA Championship; he won the Oregon Open a record eight times. In competition on the PGA Tour, Duden's best showings were three runner-up finishes between 1959 and 1964. His best finish in a major championship was T-46 at the 1954 U.S. Open.

Duden invented and patented the croquet style putter, which he named "The Dude." When other well-known professionals like Sam Snead adopted this revolutionary putting technique, its popularity began to surge; however, the USGA banned it when traditionalists like Bobby Jones objected.

Duden had 22 holes-in-one during his career. In his later years, he worked as a teaching pro at Glendoveer Golf Course, where an annual tournament bears his name.

== Awards and honors ==
- In 1993, Duden was inducted into the Pacific Northwest Section PGA Hall of Fame
- In 1995, Duden was inducted into the Oregon Sports Hall of Fame

== Professional wins ==
this list is incomplete

=== Regular career wins ===
- 1952 Oregon Open
- 1953 Oregon Open
- 1958 Almaden Open
- 1959 Oregon Open, Northwest Open
- 1960 Washington Open, Sahara Pro-Am, British Columbia Open
- 1961 Pacific Northwest PGA Championship, British Columbia Open
- 1962 Oregon Open
- 1963 Northwest Open
- 1965 Willow Park Pro-Am (Canada)
- 1966 Pacific Northwest PGA Championship
- 1967 Oregon Open
- 1968 Northwest Open
- 1969 Oregon Open, Washington Open
- 1970 Oregon Open, Washington Open, Pacific Northwest PGA Championship
- 1973 Oregon Open
- 1977 Pay Less Classic

=== Senior wins ===
this list is incomplete

- 1971 Pacific Northwest Senior PGA Championship
- 1973 Pacific Northwest Senior PGA Championship
- 1975 Pacific Northwest Senior PGA Championship
- 1976 Pacific Northwest Senior PGA Championship
- 1978 Pacific Northwest Senior PGA Championship
- 1979 Pacific Northwest Senior PGA Championship
- 1982 Pacific Northwest Senior PGA Championship

== U.S. national team appearances ==
- PGA Cup: 1977 (tie)
