= Northwest Open =

Tournament information
- Location: Pacific Northwest
- Established: 1905
- Organized by: PGA of America
- Format: Stroke play – 54 holes
- Month played: August

Current champion
- Preston Bebich

The Northwest Open is golf tournament played in the Pacific Northwest, open to both amateur and professional golfers. It is organized by the Pacific Northwest section of the PGA of America. It has been played annually since 1905 at a variety of courses.

== Winners ==
- 2026 Preston Bebich
- 2025 Rudy Caparas
- 2024 Collin Hodgkinson (a)
- 2023 Daniel Campbell
- 2022 Graham Moody (a)
- 2021 Max Sekulic (a)
- 2020 Nathan Cogswell (a)
- 2019 Derek Berg
- 2018 Shane Prante
- 2017 Shane Prante
- 2016 Brian Thornton
- 2015 Derek Barron
- 2014 Carl Jonson (a)
- 2013 Shane Prante
- 2012 Brandon Kearney
- 2011 Corey Prugh
- 2010 Brian Thornton
- 2009 Mike Schoner
- 2008 Rob Clark
- 2007 Jeff Coston
- 2006 Derek Berg (a)
- 2005 Derek Berg (a)
- 2004 Erik Hanson (a)
- 2003 Bob Conrad
- 2002 Michael Combs
- 2001 Jeff Coston
- 2000 Bill Porter
- 1999 Brent Murray
- 1998 Bill Porter
- 1997 Bill Porter
- 1996 Doug Hixson
- 1995 John McComish
- 1994 Rick Fehr
- 1993 Rick Acton
- 1992 Dave DeLong
- 1991 Steve Rintoul
- 1990 Fred Couples
- 1989 Brian Mogg
- 1988 Fred Couples
- 1987 Bob Gilder
- 1986 John DeLong
- 1985 Mike Gove
- 1984 Don Bies
- 1983 Randy Jensen
- 1982 Jeff Sanders
- 1981 Pat Fitzsimons
- 1980 Craig Griswold
- 1979 Dave Crowe
- 1978 Rick Acton
- 1977 Pat Fitzsimons
- 1976 John Fought
- 1975 Tim Berg
- 1974 Bill Wakeham
- 1973 Rick Acton
- 1972 Tim Berg
- 1971 Bob Ellsworth
- 1970 Jim McLean
- 1969 Pat Fitzsimons (a)
- 1968 Bob Duden
- 1967 Otto Hofmeister
- 1966 Al Mengert
- 1965 Jim Peterson
- 1964 Rod Funseth
- 1963 Bob Duden
- 1962 Don Bies
- 1961 Bud Ward
- 1960 Stan Leonard
- 1959 Bob Duden
- 1958 Don Taylor
- 1957 Al Feldman
- 1956 Ockie Eliason
- 1955 Ockie Eliason
- 1954 Eddie Draper
- 1953 Bruce Cudd
- 1952 Al Mengert
- 1951 Harold West
- 1950 Ray Honsberger
- 1949 Ed Oliver
- 1948 Bud Ward (a)
- 1947 Bud Ward (a)
- 1946 Bud Ward (a)
- 1943–45 No tournament
- 1942 Harry Givan
- 1941 Al Zimmerman
- 1940 Bud Ward (a)
- 1939 Bud Ward (a)
- 1938 Al Zimmerman
- 1937 Stan Leonard (a)
- 1936 Emery Zimmerman
- 1935 James Johnson
- 1934 Eddie Hogan
- 1933 Al Zimmerman
- 1932 Neil Christian
- 1931 Al Zimmerman
- 1930 Bert Wilde
- 1929 Neil Christian
- 1928 Oscar Willing (a)
- 1927 Walter Pursey
- 1926 John Junor
- 1925 Jack Hueston
- 1924 Neil Christian
- 1923 Phil Taylor
- 1922 Davie Black
- 1921 No tournament
- 1920 Davie Black
- 1919 Harold Samson
- 1918 George Turnbull
- 1917 Walter Fovargue
- 1916 Rudie Wilhelm
- 1915 William Leith
- 1914 George Turnbull
- 1913 Jim Barnes
- 1912 Jim Barnes
- 1911 Jim Barnes
- 1910 Robert Johnstone
- 1909 Jim Barnes
- 1908 Robert Johnstone
- 1907 Robert Johnstone
- 1906 Robert Johnstone
- 1905 George Smith

(a) denotes amateur
