= 2016 PGA Championship =

Tournament information
- Dates: July 28–31, 2016
- Location: Springfield, New Jersey; 40.705°N 74.328°W
- Courses: Baltusrol Golf Club; Lower Course
- Organized by: PGA of America
- Tours: PGA Tour; European Tour; Japan Golf Tour

Statistics
- Par: 70
- Length: 7,428 yards (6,792 m)
- Field: 156 players, 86 after cut
- Cut: 142 (+2)
- Prize fund: $10,000,000 €9,040,528
- Winner's share: $1,800,000 €1,627,295

Champion
- (United States) Jimmy Walker
- 266 (−14)
- Location in the United States Location in New Jersey

The 2016 PGA Championship was the 98th PGA Championship which took place from July 28–31 at Baltusrol Golf Club on the Lower Course in Springfield Township, New Jersey, west of New York City. This was the ninth major and second PGA Championship at Baltusrol, which last hosted in 2005. Jimmy Walker won his first major championship title with a score of 14 under par, one shot ahead of 2015 champion Jason Day.

This edition of the PGA Championship was moved up two weeks from its early-August spot to accommodate the 2016 Olympic tournament in Rio de Janeiro. The John Deere Classic was moved back two weeks from its mid-July spot before the Open Championship and is taking its place on the schedule for those not qualified for the Olympics.

== Course layout ==
Lower Course

Hole	1	2	3	4	5	6	7	8	9	Out	10	11	12	13	14	15	16	17	18	In	Total
Yards	478	377	503	196	425	482	501	380	210	3,552	460	431	218	451	430	453	230	649	554	3,876	7,428
Par	4	4	4	3	4	4	4	4	3	34	4	4	3	4	4	4	3	5	5	36	70

Lengths of the course for previous major championships:

- 7,392 yards (6,759 m), par 70 - 2005 PGA Championship
- 7,116 yards (6,507 m), par 70 - 1993 U.S. Open
- 7,013 yards (6,413 m), par 70 - 1980 U.S. Open
- 7,015 yards (6,415 m), par 70 - 1967 U.S. Open
- 7,027 yards (6,425 m), par 70 - 1954 U.S. Open
- 6,866 yards (6,278 m), par 72 - 1936 U.S. Open (Upper Course)
- 6,212 yards (5,680 m), par 74 - 1915 U.S. Open (Old Course)
- 6,003 yards (5,489 m), par - 1903 U.S. Open (Old Course)
  The Old Course no longer exists, plowed under in 1918

== Field ==
The following qualification criteria were used to select the field. Each player is listed according to the first category by which he qualified with additional categories in which he qualified shown in parentheses.

1. All former PGA Champions

- Rich Beem
- Keegan Bradley (9)
- John Daly
- Jason Day (6,8,10)
- Jason Dufner (8,10)
- Pádraig Harrington
- Martin Kaymer (2,6,9)
- Rory McIlroy (4,8,9)
- Shaun Micheel
- Phil Mickelson (4,8,9)
- Vijay Singh
- David Toms
- Yang Yong-eun
- Davis Love III (10) and Tiger Woods did not play due to injury.
- The following former champions did not enter: Paul Azinger, Mark Brooks, Jack Burke Jr., Steve Elkington, Dow Finsterwald, Raymond Floyd, Doug Ford, Al Geiberger, Wayne Grady, David Graham, Hubert Green, Don January, John Mahaffey, Larry Nelson, Bobby Nichols, Jack Nicklaus, Gary Player, Nick Price, Jeff Sluman, Dave Stockton, Hal Sutton, Lee Trevino, Bob Tway, Lanny Wadkins

2. Winners of last five U.S. Opens

- Dustin Johnson (6,8,10)
- Justin Rose (6,8,9)
- Webb Simpson (8,9)
- Jordan Spieth (3,6,8,9,10)

3. Winners of last five Masters Tournaments

- Adam Scott (8,10)
- Bubba Watson (8,9,10)
- Danny Willett (8)

4. Winners of last five British Opens

- Ernie Els
- Zach Johnson (8,9)
- Henrik Stenson (8,9)

5. Current Senior PGA Champion

- Rocco Mediate

6. 15 low scorers and ties in the 2015 PGA Championship

- George Coetzee
- Tony Finau (8,10)
- Branden Grace (8,10)
- Russell Henley
- Brooks Koepka (8)
- Matt Kuchar (8,9)
- Anirban Lahiri
- David Lingmerth (8)
- Brandt Snedeker (8,10)
- Brendan Steele (8)
- Robert Streb (8)

7. 20 low scorers in the 2016 PGA Professional Championship

- Rich Berberian, Jr.
- Michael Block
- Mark Brown
- Matt Dobyns
- Brian Gaffney
- Ryan Helminen
- Johan Kok
- Rob Labritz
- Brad Lardon
- Mitch Lowe
- David Muttitt
- Brad Ott
- Rod Perry
- Ben Polland
- Rick Schuller
- Tommy Sharp
- Josh Speight
- Joe Summerhays
- Omar Uresti
- Wyatt Worthington II
- Although Karen Paolozzi placed in the top 20, she was not eligible for entry to the PGA Championship under the Whaley Rule.

8. Top 70 leaders in official money standings from the 2015 WGC-Bridgestone Invitational to the 2016 Open Championship and Barbasol Championship

- Aaron Baddeley (10)
- Daniel Berger (10)
- Jason Bohn
- Paul Casey
- Roberto Castro
- Kevin Chappell
- Jon Curran
- Harris English
- Rickie Fowler (9,10)
- Jim Furyk (9)
- Sergio García (9,10)
- Fabián Gómez (10)
- Emiliano Grillo (10)
- Bill Haas
- James Hahn (10)
- Jim Herman (10)
- Charley Hoffman (10)
- J. B. Holmes
- Billy Hurley III (10)
- Smylie Kaufman (10)
- Kim Si-woo
- Chris Kirk
- Kevin Kisner (10)
- Patton Kizzire
- Colt Knost
- Russell Knox (10)
- Danny Lee
- Jamie Lovemark
- Shane Lowry
- Hideki Matsuyama (10)
- Graeme McDowell (9,10)
- William McGirt (10)
- Bryce Molder
- Ryan Moore
- Kevin Na
- Louis Oosthuizen
- Ryan Palmer
- Scott Piercy
- Patrick Reed (9)
- Kyle Reifers
- Charl Schwartzel (10)
- Kevin Streelman
- Brian Stuard (10)
- Daniel Summerhays
- Vaughn Taylor (10)
- Justin Thomas (10)
- Jimmy Walker (9)
- Gary Woodland
- Charles Howell III did not play due to injury.

9. Members of the United States and European 2014 Ryder Cup teams (provided they are ranked in the top 100 in the Official World Golf Ranking on July 1, 2016)

- Jamie Donaldson
- Victor Dubuisson
- Lee Westwood
- Hunter Mahan (162), Thomas Bjørn (294), and Stephen Gallacher (290) did not qualify.
- Ian Poulter did not play due to a foot injury.

10. Winners of tournaments co-sponsored or approved by the PGA Tour since the 2015 PGA Championship

- Greg Chalmers
- Peter Malnati
- Jhonattan Vegas

11. Vacancies are filled by the first available player from the list of alternates (those below 70th place in official money standings).

- Zac Blair
- Billy Horschel
- Freddie Jacobson
- Jason Kokrak
- Steve Stricker
- Cameron Tringale
- Harold Varner III

12. The PGA of America reserves the right to invite additional players not included in the categories listed above

- An Byeong-hun
- Kiradech Aphibarnrat
- Grégory Bourdy
- Kristoffer Broberg
- Rafa Cabrera-Bello
- K. J. Choi
- Darren Clarke
- Nicolas Colsaerts
- Luke Donald
- Bradley Dredge
- Ross Fisher
- Matt Fitzpatrick
- Marcus Fraser
- Tyrrell Hatton
- Scott Hend
- Yuta Ikeda
- Thongchai Jaidee
- Andrew Johnston
- Matt Jones
- Rikard Karlberg
- Kim Kyung-tae
- Søren Kjeldsen
- Lee Soo-min
- Marc Leishman
- Joost Luiten
- Troy Merritt
- Francesco Molinari
- James Morrison
- Alex Norén
- Thorbjørn Olesen
- Thomas Pieters
- John Senden
- Song Young-han
- Brandon Stone
- Andy Sullivan
- Hideto Tanihara
- Wang Jeung-hun
- Bernd Wiesberger
- Chris Wood

Alternates (from category 11)

1. Jonas Blixt (82) – replaced Charles Howell III

== Round summaries ==
=== First round ===
Thursday, July 28, 2016

Jimmy Walker led after the first round with a five-under-par 65, one clear of Ross Fisher, Martin Kaymer and Emiliano Grillo. Two-time PGA winner Rory McIlroy was nine shots off the lead after a four-over-par 74 and 2016 U.S. Open champion Dustin Johnson was further behind at seven-over-par 77.

Place	Player	Score	To par
1	(United States) Jimmy Walker	65	−5
T2	(England) Ross Fisher	66	−4
T2	(Argentina) Emiliano Grillo	66	−4
T2	(Germany) Martin Kaymer	66	−4
T5	(United States) Harris English	67	−3
T5	(United States) James Hahn	67	−3
T5	(Sweden) Henrik Stenson	67	−3
T5	(England) Andy Sullivan	67	−3
T9	(South Korea) K. J. Choi	68	−2
T9	(Australia) Jason Day	68	−2
T9	(United States) Rickie Fowler	68	−2
T9	(Australia) Scott Hend	68	−2
T9	(United States) Russell Henley	68	−2
T9	(United States) Brooks Koepka	68	−2
T9	(Sweden) David Lingmerth	68	−2
T9	(South Africa) Louis Oosthuizen	68	−2
T9	(Australia) John Senden	68	−2
T9	(United States) Robert Streb	68	−2
T9	(United States) Vaughn Taylor	68	−2
T9	(Venezuela) Jhonattan Vegas	68	−2

=== Second round ===
Friday, July 29, 2016

Robert Streb shot a major record-tying 63 to move into a tie for first place with first round leader Jimmy Walker at 131 (−9). Jason Day, the defending champion, was tied for third place, two strokes behind at 133 (−7) while the 2016 Open Championship winner, Henrik Stenson, was in fifth place at 134 (−6). Danny Willett, the 2016 Masters Tournament champion, was well back at 141, while Dustin Johnson, the 2016 U.S. Open winner, missed the cut with a 149 (+9). The cut was at 142 (+2) and 86 players made the cut.

Place	Player	Score	To par
T1	(United States) Robert Streb	68-63=131	−9
T1	(United States) Jimmy Walker	65-66=131	−9
T3	(Australia) Jason Day	68-65=133	−7
T3	(Argentina) Emiliano Grillo	66-67=133	−7
5	(Sweden) Henrik Stenson	67-67=134	−6
T6	(Germany) Martin Kaymer	66-69=135	−5
T6	(United States) Brooks Koepka	68-67=135	−5
T6	(United States) Patrick Reed	70-65=135	−5
T9	(Wales) Jamie Donaldson	69-67=136	−4
T9	(United States) Harris English	67-69=136	−4
T9	(United States) Rickie Fowler	68-68=136	−4
T9	(Japan) Hideki Matsuyama	69-67=136	−4

=== Third round ===
Saturday, July 30, 2016

Play was suspended at 2:14 pm EDT due to dangerous weather conditions. Only 37 players finished their third rounds, with the leaders yet to tee off. Kevin Kisner was the overnight leader at the clubhouse at 5 under par.

Place	Player	Score	To par
T1	(United States) Robert Streb	68-63=131*	−9
T1	(United States) Jimmy Walker	65-66=131*	−9
T3	(Australia) Jason Day	68-65=133*	−7
T3	(Argentina) Emiliano Grillo	66-67=133*	−7
5	(Sweden) Henrik Stenson	67-67=134*	−6
T6	(Germany) Martin Kaymer	66-69=135*	−5
T6	(United States) Brooks Koepka	68-67=135*	−5
T6	(United States) Patrick Reed	70-65=135*	−5
T6	(United States) Kevin Kisner	71-69-65=205	−5

*Had not yet started their third round.

Sunday, July 31, 2016

Play was resumed at 7am EDT on Sunday. Jimmy Walker went into the final round with a single shot lead over Jason Day, and two shots ahead of Brooks Koepka and Henrik Stenson.

Place	Player	Score	To par
1	(United States) Jimmy Walker	65-66-68=199	−11
2	(Australia) Jason Day	68-65-67=200	−10
T3	(United States) Brooks Koepka	68-67-66=201	−9
T3	(Sweden) Henrik Stenson	67-67-67=201	−9
T5	(United States) William McGirt	70-67-66=203	−7
T5	(Japan) Hideki Matsuyama	69-67-67=201	−7
T5	(United States) Robert Streb	68-63-72=201	−7
T8	(South Africa) Branden Grace	70-66-66=204	−6
T8	(United States) Webb Simpson	69-69-66=204	−6
T8	(United States) Daniel Summerhays	70-67-67=204	−6

=== Final round ===
Sunday, July 31, 2016

The third round pairings were kept for the final round, and the final pair of Jimmy Walker and Robert Streb teed off shortly after their scheduled time of 3:16 pm EDT. Walker made no bogeys (or worse) during the final round, with all pars on the front nine, then made two consecutive birdies, the first by holing out from the greenside bunker on the 10th hole. His third and final birdie came at 17 for a three-shot lead over defending champion Jason Day, who quickly responded with an eagle on the 72nd hole, narrowing the margin to one shot. Walker won wire-to-wire by making a 3-foot (0.91 m) par putt on the final hole to win by a stroke. With Walker's win, it was the first time since 2011 that all four major golf championships were won by first-time winners.

Due to course conditions, the fourth round was played with preferred lies, allowing players to "lift, clean and place" their balls on the fairways. This is believed to be the first time the rule was invoked in a major championship.

==== Final leaderboard ====
Champion
(c) = past champion

Note: Top 15 and ties qualify for the 2017 PGA Championship; top 4 and ties qualify for the 2017 Masters Tournament

Place	Player	Score	To par	Money ($)
1	(United States) Jimmy Walker	65-66-68-67=266	−14	1,800,000
2	(Australia) Jason Day (c)	68-65-67-67=267	−13	1,080,000
3	(United States) Daniel Summerhays	70-67-67-66=270	−10	680,000
T4	(South Africa) Branden Grace	70-68-66-67=271	−9	303,750
T4	(United States) Brooks Koepka	68-67-66-70=271	−9	303,750
T4	(Japan) Hideki Matsuyama	69-67-67-68=271	−9	303,750
T7	(Germany) Martin Kaymer (c)	66-69-71-66=272	−8	293,000
T7	(Sweden) Henrik Stenson	67-67-67-71=272	−8	293,000
T7	(United States) Robert Streb	68-63-72-69=272	−8	293,000
T10	(England) Paul Casey	69-69-68-67=273	−7	233,000
T10	(England) Tyrrell Hatton	71-68-66-68=273	−7	233,000
T10	(United States) William McGirt	70-67-66-70=273	−7	233,000

Leaderboard below the top 10
Place	Player	Score	To par	Money ($)
T13	(Argentina) Emiliano Grillo	66-67-73-68=274	−6	172,400
T13	(Republic of Ireland) Pádraig Harrington (c)	71-70-65-68=274	−6	172,400
T13	(United States) Patrick Reed	70-65-70-69=274	−6	172,400
T13	(United States) Webb Simpson	69-69-66-70=274	−6	172,400
T13	(United States) Jordan Spieth	70-67-69-68=274	−6	172,400
T18	(France) Grégory Bourdy	69-68-69-69=275	−5	121,000
T18	(United States) Kevin Kisner	71-69-65-70=275	−5	121,000
T18	(Australia) Adam Scott	70-67-69-69=275	−5	121,000
T18	(Australia) John Senden	68-70-69-68=275	−5	121,000
T22	(South Korea) K. J. Choi	68-70-71-67=276	−4	75,636
T22	(United States) Russell Henley	68-72-68-68=276	−4	75,636
T22	(United States) Billy Hurley III	72-65-69-70-276	−4	75,636
T22	(Scotland) Russell Knox	70-70-67-69=276	−4	75,636
T22	(Sweden) David Lingmerth	68-70-69-69=276	−4	75,636
T22	(Italy) Francesco Molinari	71-70-68-67=276	−4	75,636
T22	(United States) Kevin Na	71-68-71-66=276	−4	75,636
T22	(South Africa) Louis Oosthuizen	68-70-70-68=276	−4	75,636
T22	(United States) Kyle Reifers	70-70-70-66=276	−4	75,636
T22	(England) Justin Rose	70-72-66-68=276	−4	75,636
T22	(Venezuela) Jhonattan Vegas	68-71-70-67=276	−4	75,636
T33	(United States) Jon Curran	69-69-69-70=277	−3	45,289
T33	(United States) Rickie Fowler	68-68-71-70=277	−3	45,289
T33	(Japan) Yuta Ikeda	70-67-73-67=277	−3	45,289
T33	(United States) Zach Johnson	71-66-71-69=277	−3	45,289
T33	(Denmark) Søren Kjeldsen	70-69-73-65=277	−3	45,289
T33	(Netherlands) Joost Luiten	72-70-70-65=277	−3	45,289
T33	(United States) Phil Mickelson (c)	71-70-68-68=277	−3	45,289
T33	(Japan) Hideto Tanihara	71-66-73-67=277	−3	45,289
T33	(United States) Vaughn Taylor	68-71-70-68=277	−3	45,289
T42	(United States) Keegan Bradley (c)	73-68-71-66=278	−2	30,143
T42	(Wales) Jamie Donaldson	69-67-72-70=278	−2	30,143
T42	(England) Ross Fisher	66-73-70-69=278	−2	30,143
T42	(Australia) Scott Hend	68-70-68-72=278	−2	30,143
T42	(United States) Ryan Palmer	71-71-69-67=278	−2	30,143
T42	(South Africa) Charl Schwartzel	73-69-66-70=278	−2	30,143
T42	(United States) Steve Stricker	69-70-67-72=278	−2	30,143
T49	(Australia) Aaron Baddeley	70-70-71-68=279	−1	25,000
T49	(Spain) Rafa Cabrera-Bello	72-70-70-67=279	−1	25,000
T49	(England) Matt Fitzpatrick	72-70-70-67=279	−1	25,000
T49	(United States) Patton Kizzire	71-71-68-69=279	−1	25,000
T49	(United States) Jason Kokrak	70-72-69-68=279	−1	25,000
T49	(Sweden) Alex Norén	70-68-71-70=279	−1	25,000
T49	(England) Andy Sullivan	67-71-72-69=279	−1	25,000
T56	(United States) Bill Haas	70-70-68-72=280	E	22,250
T56	(New Zealand) Danny Lee	69-70-70-71=280	E	22,250
T56	(United States) Brandt Snedeker	73-66-70-71=280	E	22,250
T56	(South Korea) Song Young-han	71-68-73-68=280	E	22,250
T60	(South Africa) George Coetzee	72-67-74-68=281	+1	20,000
T60	(United States) Jason Dufner (c)	71-71-70-69=281	+1	20,000
T60	(United States) Harris English	67-69-74-71=281	+1	20,000
T60	(England) Andrew Johnston	70-69-71-71=281	+1	20,000
T60	(Australia) Marc Leishman	71-69-67-74=281	+1	20,000
T60	(United States) Bubba Watson	71-69-70-71=281	+1	20,000
T66	(Thailand) Kiradech Aphibarnrat	70-72-69-71=282	+2	18,500
T66	(United States) Roberto Castro	72-70-69-71=282	+2	18,500
T66	(South Africa) Ernie Els	73-69-69-71=282	+2	18,500
T66	(United States) Justin Thomas	69-72-72-69=282	+2	18,500
T70	(United States) James Hahn	67-73-70-73=283	+3	17,900
T70	(United States) Colt Knost	69-73-68-73=283	+3	17,900
T70	(United States) Ryan Moore	71-67-74-71=283	+3	17,900
T73	(United States) Rich Beem (c)	69-72-72-71=284	+4	17,450
T73	(United States) Daniel Berger	71-69-71-73=284	+4	17,450
T73	(Australia) Marcus Fraser	71-68-72-73=284	+4	17,450
T73	(United States) Jim Furyk	74-67-69-74=284	+4	17,450
T73	(Sweden) Freddie Jacobson	71-71-70-72=284	+4	17,450
T73	(Thailand) Thongchai Jaidee	72-70-73-69=284	+4	17,450
T79	(Wales) Bradley Dredge	69-71-75-70=285	+5	16,900
T79	(United States) Billy Horschel	72-70-71-72=285	+5	16,900
T79	(Australia) Matt Jones	74-68-70-73=285	+5	16,900
T79	(United States) Brian Stuard	70-70-75-70=285	+5	16,900
T79	(England) Danny Willett	71-70-74-70=285	+5	16,900
84	(United States) Cameron Tringale	72-68-77-69=286	+6	16,600
85	(England) Lee Westwood	69-70-73-75=287	+7	16,500
86	(Belgium) Thomas Pieters	71-70-75-74=290	+10	16,400
CUT	(England) Luke Donald	72-71=143	+3	
CUT	(France) Victor Dubuisson	69-74=143	+3	
CUT	(United States) Ryan Helminen	72-71=143	+3	
CUT	(United States) Smylie Kaufman	73-70=143	+3	
CUT	(United States) Chris Kirk	74-69=143	+3	
CUT	(Northern Ireland) Rory McIlroy (c)	74-69=143	+3	
CUT	(United States) Scott Piercy	72-71=143	+3	
CUT	(England) Chris Wood	69-74=143	+3	
CUT	(South Korea) Yang Yong-eun (c)	72-71=143	+3	
CUT	(South Korea) An Byeong-hun	72-72=144	+4	
CUT	(United States) Zac Blair	73-71=144	+4	
CUT	(United States) J. B. Holmes	75-69=144	+4	
CUT	(Sweden) Rikard Karlberg	72-72=144	+4	
CUT	(South Korea) Kim Si-woo	71-73=144	+4	
CUT	(Denmark) Thorbjørn Olesen	70-74=144	+4	
CUT	(United States) Rod Perry	73-71=144	+4	
CUT	(Fiji) Vijay Singh (c)	74-70=144	+4	
CUT	(United States) Brendan Steele	71-73=144	+4	
CUT	(United States) Harold Varner III	72-72=144	+4	
CUT	(United States) Jason Bohn	71-74=145	+5	
CUT	(United States) Kevin Chappell	72-73=145	+5	
CUT	(Northern Ireland) Darren Clarke	74-71=145	+5	
CUT	(United States) Matt Dobyns	73-72=145	+5	
CUT	(Spain) Sergio García	71-74=145	+5	
CUT	(United States) Charley Hoffman	75-70=145	+5	
CUT	(Republic of Ireland) Shane Lowry	72-73=145	+5	
CUT	(United States) Bryce Molder	74-71=145	+5	
CUT	(United States) Ben Polland	72-73=145	+5	
CUT	(United States) Kevin Streelman	75-70=145	+5	
CUT	(United States) Gary Woodland	73-72=145	+5	
CUT	(United States) Rich Berberian, Jr.	72-74=146	+6	
CUT	(Sweden) Jonas Blixt	75-71=146	+6	
CUT	(Sweden) Kristoffer Broberg	72-74=146	+6	
CUT	(United States) Mark Brown	75-71=146	+6	
CUT	(United States) Matt Kuchar	74-72=146	+6	
CUT	(India) Anirban Lahiri	73-73=146	+6	
CUT	(United States) Peter Malnati	73-73=146	+6	
CUT	(Austria) Bernd Wiesberger	75-71=146	+6	
CUT	(United States) John Daly (c)	74-73=147	+7	
CUT	(United States) Tony Finau	77-70=147	+7	
CUT	(United States) Brian Gaffney	74-73=147	+7	
CUT	(United States) Rob Labritz	71-76=147	+7	
CUT	(South Korea) Lee Soo-min	77-70=147	+7	
CUT	(United States) Jamie Lovemark	71-76=147	+7	
CUT	(United States) David Muttitt	73-74=147	+7	
CUT	(United States) David Toms (c)	74-73=147	+7	
CUT	(United States) Michael Block	72-76=148	+8	
CUT	(Australia) Greg Chalmers	72-76=148	+8	
CUT	(Belgium) Nicolas Colsaerts	72-76=148	+8	
CUT	(Argentina) Fabián Gómez	75-73=148	+8	
CUT	(United States) Jim Herman	77-71=148	+8	
CUT	(South Korea) Kim Kyung-tae	77-71=148	+8	
CUT	(South Africa) Johan Kok	72-76=148	+8	
CUT	(United States) Josh Speight	77-71=148	+8	
CUT	(South Korea) Wang Jeung-hun	73-75=148	+8	
CUT	(United States) Dustin Johnson	77-72=149	+9	
CUT	(Northern Ireland) Graeme McDowell	74-75=149	+9	
CUT	(United States) Rocco Mediate	76-73=149	+9	
CUT	(United States) Troy Merritt	77-72=149	+9	
CUT	(United States) Joe Summerhays	76-73=149	+9	
CUT	(United States) Mitch Lowe	74-76=150	+10	
CUT	(United States) Tommy Sharp	77-73=150	+10	
CUT	(South Africa) Brandon Stone	79-71=150	+10	
CUT	(United States) Omar Uresti	72-78=150	+10	
CUT	(United States) Shaun Micheel (c)	77-74=151	+11	
CUT	(United States) Brad Ott	79-72=151	+11	
CUT	(United States) Wyatt Worthington II	76-76=152	+12	
CUT	(England) James Morrison	78-76=154	+14	
CUT	(United States) Rick Schuller	78-76=154	+14	
CUT	(United States) Brad Lardon	83-74=157	+17	

==== Scorecard ====
Final round

Hole	1	2	3	4	5	6	7	8	9	10	11	12	13	14	15	16	17	18
Par	4	4	4	3	4	4	4	4	3	4	4	3	4	4	4	3	5	5
(United States) Walker	−11	−11	−11	−11	−11	−11	−11	−11	−11	−12	−13	−13	−13	−13	−13	−13	−14	−14
(Australia) Day	−9	−9	−8	−8	−9	−9	−9	−9	−10	−10	−11	−11	−11	−11	−11	−11	−11	−13
(United States) Summerhays	−6	−6	−6	−6	−6	−6	−5	−5	−6	−6	−6	−7	−8	−7	−8	−9	−9	−10
(South Africa) Grace	−6	−7	−7	−8	−8	−8	−9	−9	−9	−9	−9	−9	−10	−10	−10	−9	−9	−9
(United States) Koepka	−9	−9	−9	−9	−9	−9	−9	−9	−9	−9	−8	−8	−8	−8	−9	−8	−8	−9
(Japan) Matsuyama	−7	−7	−7	−7	−7	−7	−7	−7	−7	−7	−8	−8	−8	−8	−8	−8	−8	−9
(Germany) Kaymer	−4	−5	−5	−5	−4	−4	−5	−5	−5	−5	−5	−6	−6	−7	−7	−6	−6	−8
(Sweden) Stenson	−9	−9	−9	−9	−9	−10	−10	−10	−10	−10	−10	−10	−10	−10	−8	−8	−8	−8
(United States) Streb	−7	−7	−6	−6	−7	−7	−7	−7	−8	−8	−9	−9	−9	−9	−9	−9	−8	−8

Cumulative tournament scores, relative to par

Eagle	Birdie	Bogey	Double bogey
