= Kathy Guadagnino =

American professional golfer (born 1961)

Personal information
- Full name: Kathy Baker Guadagnino
- Nationality: United States
- Born: March 20, 1961 (age 65) Albany, New York, U.S.
- Height: 5 ft 9 in (1.75 m)

Career
- Sport: Golf
- College: University of Tulsa; South Florida Bible College & Theological Seminary
- Turned professional: 1983
- Former tour: LPGA Tour (1983-1999)
- Professional wins: 2

Number of wins by tour
- LPGA Tour: 2

Best results in LPGA major championships (wins: 1)
- Chevron Championship: T11: 1989
- Women's PGA C'ship: T26: 1995
- U.S. Women's Open: Won: 1985
- du Maurier Classic: T8: 1993

Kathy Guadagnino (born March 20, 1961) is an American professional golfer. Up to 1987, she played under her maiden name of Kathy Baker.

== Career ==
She was born in Albany, New York. She attended Charlotte Latin School in Charlotte, North Carolina.

In college, she attended the University of Tulsa and South Florida Bible College & Theological Seminary and was the low amateur at the 1983 Nabisco Dinah Shore. In 1982, while attending Tulsa, Guadagnino won the inaugural NCAA individual title, while leading her team to both the AIAW and NCAA national titles.

She joined the LPGA Tour and in 1985, she was a surprise winner of the U.S. Women's Open at Baltusrol Golf Club. Guadagnino's only other LPGA Tour title came at the Konica San Jose Classic in 1988. Her best money list finish was 13th in 1985; she retired from the tour after the 1999 season.

== Amateur wins ==
this list may be incomplete

- 1978 Junior PGA Championship
- 1980 Women's Western Amateur
- 1982 NCAA individual championship

== Professional wins ==
=== LPGA Tour wins (2) ===
Legend
LPGA Tour major championships (1)
Other LPGA Tour (1)

No.	Date	Tournament	Winning score	Margin of victory	Runner-up
1	Jul 14, 1985	U.S. Women's Open	−8 (70-72-68-70=280)	3 strokes	(United States) Judy Clark
2	Oct 2, 1988	Konica San Jose Classic	−9 (69-71-67=207)	1 stroke	(United States) Cathy Marino

== Major championships ==
=== Wins (1) ===
Year	Championship	Winning score	Margin	Runner-up
1985	U.S. Women's Open	−8 (70-72-68-70=280)	3 strokes	(United States) Judy Clark

=== Results timeline ===
Tournament	1980	1981	1982	1983	1984	1985	1986	1987	1988	1989
Nabisco Dinah Shore				T40		T66	T40	T51	T30	T11
LPGA Championship					CUT	T44	T33	T50	T58	
U.S. Women's Open	CUT		T13	T35	T50	1	T21	CUT	T29	T43
du Maurier Classic					T28	T29	T51	T39		T40

Tournament	1990	1991	1992	1993	1994	1995	1996	1997	1998
Nabisco Dinah Shore	CUT	T69	CUT	CUT	T69	T63	T74	CUT	CUT
LPGA Championship					T39	T26	CUT		CUT
U.S. Women's Open		CUT	CUT	T58	CUT	CUT			
du Maurier Classic		CUT		T8		CUT		CUT	T63

Win
Top 10
Did not play

CUT = missed the half-way cut
"T" = tied

=== Summary ===
Tournament	Wins	2nd	3rd	Top-5	Top-10	Top-25	Events	Cuts made
Nabisco Dinah Shore	0	0	0	0	0	1	15	10
LPGA Championship	0	0	0	0	0	0	9	6
U.S. Women's Open	1	0	0	1	1	3	14	8
du Maurier Classic	0	0	0	0	1	1	10	7
Totals	1	0	0	1	2	5	48	31

- Most consecutive cuts made – 13 (1984 U.S. Open – 1987 du Maurier Classic)
- Longest streak of top-10s – 1 (twice)

== U.S. national team appearances ==
Amateur

- Curtis Cup: 1982 (winners)
- Espirito Santo Trophy: 1982 (winners)
