= SFBC =

SFBC may refer to:

- San Francisco Boys Chorus
- San Francisco Bicycle Coalition
- South Florida Bible College & Theological Seminary
- Special Forces Briefing Course
- The Science Fiction Book Club, a discount book purchasing program operated by Bookspan
- The Swiss Federal Banking Commission, a constituent of the Swiss Financial Market Supervisory Authority
