= 1961 U.S. Women's Open =

Coordinates: 40.698°N 74.333°W

Tournament information
- Dates: June 29 – July 1, 1961
- Location: Springfield, New Jersey
- Courses: Baltusrol Golf Club, Lower Course
- Organized by: USGA
- Tour: LPGA Tour
- Format: Stroke play – 72 holes

Statistics
- Par: 72
- Length: 6,372 yards (5,827 m)
- Field: 82: 30 pros, 52 amateurs 41 after cut
- Cut: 168 (+24)
- Prize fund: $8,000
- Winner's share: $1,800

Champion
- (United States) Mickey Wright
- 293 (+5)

Location in the United States
Location in New Jersey

The 1961 U.S. Women's Open was the 16th U.S. Women's Open, held June 29 to July 1 at the Lower Course of Baltusrol Golf Club in Springfield, New Jersey.

Mickey Wright, age 26, won the third of her four U.S. Women's Open titles, six strokes ahead of runner-up Betsy Rawls, a four-time winner and the defending champion. It was Wright's third win at the U.S. Women's Open in four years, and the sixth of her thirteen major titles.

After opening with a par 72 on Thursday to co-lead, Wright shot an 80 (+8) in the second round on Friday and dropped four shots back after 36 holes. A three-under 69 on Saturday morning regained the lead after 54 holes, two strokes ahead of Rawls.

The Lower Course has hosted the U.S. Open four times (two won by Jack Nicklaus) and a PGA Championship, won by Phil Mickelson. The U.S. Women's Open returned to Baltusrol in 1985, but was played on the Upper Course.

== Final leaderboard ==
Saturday, July 1, 1961

Place	Player	Score	To par	Money ($)
1	(United States) Mickey Wright	72-80-69-72=293	+5	1,800
2	(United States) Betsy Rawls	74-76-73-76=299	+11	1,200
3	(United States) Ruth Jessen	75-73-77-75=300	+12	800
4	(United States) Louise Suggs	78-74-76-73=301	+13	650
5	(United States) Marilynn Smith	77-74-77-75=303	+15	500
6	(United States) Jo Ann Prentice	72-76-80-76=304	+16	400
T7	(United States) Barbara Romack	77-77-78-74=306	+18	350
T7	(Canada) Marlene Streit (a)	74-77-77-78=306	+18	0
T9	(United States) Carolyn Cudone (a)	77-76-75-80=308	+20	0
T9	(United States) Shirley Englehorn	80-73-78-77=308	+20	313
T9	(United States) Mary Lena Faulk	78-77-80-73=308	+20	313
