= 2005 PGA Championship =

Coordinates: 40.705°N 74.328°W

Tournament information
- Dates: August 11–15, 2005
- Location: Springfield, New Jersey
- Course(s): Baltusrol Golf Club; Lower Course
- Organized by: PGA of America
- Tour(s): PGA Tour; European Tour; Japan Golf Tour

Statistics
- Par: 70
- Length: 7,392 yards (6,759 m)
- Field: 156 players, 79 after cut
- Cut: 144 (+4)
- Prize fund: $6,500,000 €5,272,989
- Winner's share: $1,170,000 €949,138

Champion
- (United States) Phil Mickelson
- 276 (−4)

Location in the United States
Location in New Jersey

The 2005 PGA Championship was the 87th PGA Championship, played August 11–15 at the Baltusrol Golf Club Lower Course in Springfield, New Jersey, west of New York City. Phil Mickelson earned his first PGA Championship and second major title by flopping a chip out of deep rough to 2 feet (0.6 m) for birdie on the final hole for a one-shot victory over runners-up Steve Elkington and Thomas Bjørn. The purse was $6.5 million with a winner's share of $1.17 million.

It was the first PGA Championship held at Baltusrol, which had hosted the U.S. Open seven times, and was the first major championship at Baltusrol since the 1993 U.S. Open, won by Lee Janzen.

== Field ==
1. All former PGA Champions
2. Winners of the last five U.S. Opens (2001–2005)
3. Winners of the last five Masters (2001–2005)
4. Winners of the last five British Opens (2001–2005)
5. The 2005 Senior PGA Champion
6. The low 15 scorers and ties in The 2004 PGA Championship
7. The 25 low scorers in The 2005 PGA Club Professional Championship
8. The 70 leaders in official money standings from the 2004 International through the 2005 Buick Open
9. Members of the 2004 United States Ryder Cup Team
10. Winners of tournaments co-sponsored or approved by the PGA Tour and designated as official events from The 2004 PGA Championship to The 2005 PGA Championship. (Does not include pro-am or team competitions).
11. In addition, The PGA of America reserves the right to invite additional players not included in the categories above.
12. The 156-player field will be filled (in order) by those players below 70th place in official money standings from the 2004 International through the 2005 Buick Open.

Full eligibility list

== Course layout ==
Lower Course

Hole	1	2	3	4	5	6	7	8	9	Out	10	11	12	13	14	15	16	17	18	In	Total
Yards	478	379	503	194	423	482	505	380	212	3,556	460	440	218	424	430	430	230	650	554	3,836	7,392
Par	4	4	4	3	4	4	4	4	3	34	4	4	3	4	4	4	3	5	5	36	70

Lengths of the course for previous major championships:

- 7,116 yards (6,507 m), par 70 - 1993 U.S. Open
- 7,013 yards (6,413 m), par 70 - 1980 U.S. Open
- 7,015 yards (6,415 m), par 70 - 1967 U.S. Open
- 7,027 yards (6,425 m), par 70 - 1954 U.S. Open
- 6,866 yards (6,278 m), par 72 - 1936 U.S. Open (Upper Course)
- 6,212 yards (5,680 m), par 74 - 1915 U.S. Open (Old Course)
- 6,003 yards (5,489 m), par - 1903 U.S. Open (Old Course)
  The Old Course was plowed under in 1918

== Round summaries ==
=== First round ===
Thursday, August 11, 2005

There was a logjam up at the top upon the conclusion of the first round with twenty seven players within two shots of the lead. Six players including Phil Mickelson shot three under 67s for a one shot lead over the rest of the field. Defending champion Vijay Singh shot an even par 70 to lie three shots off the pace.

Place	Player	Score	To par
T1	(Canada) Stephen Ames	67	−3
T1	(Australia) Stuart Appleby	67	−3
T1	(United States) Ben Curtis	67	−3
T1	(South Africa) Trevor Immelman	67	−3
T1	(United States) Phil Mickelson	67	−3
T1	(South Africa) Rory Sabbatini	67	−3
T7	(United States) Ben Crane	68	−2
T7	(Australia) Steve Elkington	68	−2
T7	(South Africa) Retief Goosen	68	−2
T7	(Germany) Bernhard Langer	68	−2
T7	(United States) Davis Love III	68	−2
T7	(England) Greg Owen	68	−2
T7	(Sweden) Jesper Parnevik	68	−2
T7	(United States) Pat Perez	68	−2
T7	(United States) John Rollins	68	−2
T7	(United States) Heath Slocum	68	−2
T7	(England) Lee Westwood	68	−2

=== Second round ===
Friday, August 12, 2005

Phil Mickelson opened up a three shot lead after shooting a five under 65, the low round of the day. Jerry Kelly also shot 65 to lie sole second. Tiger Woods shot a one under 69 to make the cut line that was set at four over par. Notable players missing the cut included: Colin Montgomerie, 2003 champion Shaun Micheel and 2002 champion Rich Beem.

Place	Player	Score	To par
1	(United States) Phil Mickelson	67-65=132	−8
2	(United States) Jerry Kelly	70-65=135	−5
T3	(United States) Davis Love III	68-68=136	−4
T3	(South Africa) Rory Sabbatini	67-69=136	−4
T3	(England) Lee Westwood	68-68=136	−4
T6	(Australia) Stuart Appleby	67-70=137	−3
T6	(Japan) Shingo Katayama	71-66=137	−3
T6	(England) Greg Owen	67-70=137	−3
T6	(Sweden) Jesper Parnevik	67-70=137	−3
T6	(Fiji) Vijay Singh	70-67=137	−3

=== Third round ===
Saturday, August 13, 2005

Phil Mickelson struggled throughout much of the third round as he shot a two over 72 but it was still enough for a share of the lead with Davis Love III. Love shot his third straight 68 to make the final pairing of a major for the first time since the 2003 Open Championship. The round of the day belonged to Thomas Bjørn who matched the major championship record with a 63. It was the third 63 at Baltusrol, where Jack Nicklaus and Tom Weiskopf did it in the first round of the 1980 U.S. Open. Vijay Singh lay just two shots back after a 69 which included 17 pars before a birdie on 18.

Place	Player	Score	To par
T1	(United States) Davis Love III	68-68-68=204	−6
T1	(United States) Phil Mickelson	67-65-72=204	−6
3	(Denmark) Thomas Bjørn	71-71-63=205	−5
T4	(Australia) Stuart Appleby	67-70-69=206	−4
T4	(Australia) Steve Elkington	68-70-68=206	−4
T4	(United States) Pat Perez	68-71-67=206	−4
T4	(Fiji) Vijay Singh	70-67-69=206	−4
T8	(United States) Jason Bohn	71-68-68=207	−3
T8	(United States) Ben Curtis	67-73-67=207	−3
T8	(South Africa) Retief Goosen	68-70-69=207	−3
T8	(England) Greg Owen	68-69-70=207	−3
T8	(England) Lee Westwood	68-68-71=207	−3

=== Final round ===
Sunday, August 14, 2005

The final round was not finished on Sunday for the first time since 1986. Rain delayed much of the action, which ended with Tiger Woods as the clubhouse leader at two under. Phil Mickelson was putting for par on the 14th hole when play was suspended at 6:35 p.m. EDT. Thomas Bjørn with four holes left and Steve Elkington with three holes left were one shot off of Mickelson. Despite being the clubhouse leader, Woods returned to his Florida home on Sunday night rather than await the tournament's completion the following day. This move was heavily criticized at the time.

Place	Player	Score	To par	Hole
1	(United States) Phil Mickelson	67-65-72-51=255	−4	13
T2	(Australia) Steve Elkington	68-70-68-58=264	−3	15
T2	(Denmark) Thomas Bjørn	71-71-63-55=260	−3	14
T4	(United States) Tiger Woods	75-69-66-68=278	−2	F
T4	(Fiji) Vijay Singh	70-67-69-69=265	−2	15
T4	(United States) Davis Love III	68-68-68-53=257	−2	13

Monday, August 15, 2005

Play resumed Monday at 10:05 a.m., with six players on the course within three shots of the lead. Headed to the 72nd hole, Phil Mickelson was tied for the lead at three under with Thomas Bjørn and Steve Elkington. Mickelson birdied the par 5 18th to win his second major title. Mickelson flopped a chip from the deep grass some 50 feet (15 m) away to two feet for a birdie and a one-shot victory. Elkington and Bjorn both missed birdie putts and had to settle for par on the 554-yard (507 m) closing hole. Mickelson became the seventh wire-to-wire winner (though he shared the lead after the first and third rounds) at the PGA Championship and the first since Tiger Woods in 2000. The round of the day belonged to Ted Purdy, who ended up in a tie for tenth after a final round 66.

Place	Player	Score	To par	Money ($)
1	(United States) Phil Mickelson	67-65-72-72=276	−4	1,170,000
T2	(Denmark) Thomas Bjørn	71-71-63-72=277	−3	572,000
T2	(Australia) Steve Elkington	68-70-68-71=277	−3	572,000
T4	(United States) Davis Love III	68-68-68-74=278	−2	286,000
T4	(United States) Tiger Woods	75-69-66-68=278	−2	286,000
T6	(New Zealand) Michael Campbell	73-68-69-69=279	−1	201,500
T6	(South Africa) Retief Goosen	68-70-69-72=279	−1	201,500
T6	(Australia) Geoff Ogilvy	69-69-72-69=279	−1	201,500
T6	(United States) Pat Perez	68-71-67-73=279	−1	201,500
T10	(United States) Steve Flesch	70-71-69-70=280	E	131,800
T10	(United States) Dudley Hart	70-73-66-71=280	E	131,800
T10	(United States) Ted Purdy	69-75-70-66=280	E	131,800
T10	(Fiji) Vijay Singh	70-67-69-74=280	E	131,800
T10	(United States) David Toms	71-72-69-68=280	E	131,800

==== Scorecard ====
Final round

Hole	1	2	3	4	5	6	7	8	9	10	11	12	13	14	15	16	17	18
Par	4	4	4	3	4	4	4	4	3	4	4	3	4	4	4	3	5	5
(United States) Mickelson	−6	−6	−6	−7	−7	−6	−5	−5	−4	−3	−3	−3	−4	−4	−4	−3	−3	−4
(Denmark) Bjørn	−5	−4	−4	−4	−4	−3	−3	−3	−3	−2	−2	−2	−3	−3	−2	−2	−3	−3
(Australia) Elkington	−4	−4	−4	−4	−4	−4	−4	−4	−5	−4	−5	−5	−4	−4	−3	−3	−3	−3
(United States) Love	−6	−6	−5	−4	−3	−3	−2	−2	−2	−3	−2	−2	−2	−2	−2	−2	−2	−2
(United States) Woods	+1	+1	+2	+2	+2	+2	+2	+1	+1	+1	+1	+1	+1	E	E	E	−1	−2
(South Africa) Goosen	−4	−4	−3	−3	−3	−3	−3	−3	−3	−1	−2	−1	E	−1	−1	−1	−1	−1
(United States) Perez	−3	−3	−3	−2	−3	−2	−2	−3	−3	−2	−1	−1	E	E	E	−1	−1	−1
(Fiji) Singh	−4	−4	−2	−1	−1	−1	−1	−2	−2	−2	−2	−2	−2	−2	−2	−1	−1	E
(Australia) Appleby	−4	−3	−4	−3	−3	−2	−1	−1	E	+1	+1	+1	+1	+1	+1	+1	+1	+1
(England) Westwood	−2	−2	−1	E	+1	+1	E	E	+1	+2	+2	+2	+3	+3	+2	+3	+3	+2
(United States) Curtis	−3	−3	−3	−2	−1	−1	+1	+1	+1	+2	+2	+2	+2	+2	+4	+4	+5	+5

Cumulative tournament scores, relative to par

Birdie	Bogey	Double bogey
