= 1980 U.S. Open (golf) =

Coordinates: 40.705°N 74.328°W

Tournament information
- Dates: June 12–15, 1980
- Location: Springfield, New Jersey
- Course(s): Baltusrol Golf Club, Lower Course
- Organized by: USGA
- Tour: PGA Tour

Statistics
- Par: 70
- Length: 7,076 yards (6,470 m)
- Field: 156 players, 63 after cut
- Cut: 146 (+6)
- Prize fund: $356,700
- Winner's share: $55,000

Champion
- (United States) Jack Nicklaus
- 272 (−8)

Location in the United States
Location in New Jersey
Location in
Union County

The 1980 U.S. Open was the 80th U.S. Open, held June 12–15 at Baltusrol Golf Club in Springfield, New Jersey, west of New York City. Jack Nicklaus set a new tournament scoring record to win his fourth U.S. Open title, two strokes ahead of runner-up Isao Aoki; in fact, as the tournament transpired these two golfers ended up playing all four rounds together.

Nicklaus and Tom Weiskopf began the tournament by shooting a record-tying 63 in the first round on the Lower Course on Thursday. Weiskopf, however, did not shoot better than 75 in any other round and finished 37th. After a second round 71, Nicklaus owned a two-stroke lead over Isao Aoki. Aoki, however, carded a third consecutive round of 68 in the third to tie Nicklaus.

In the final round on Sunday, Nicklaus birdied the 3rd after Aoki recorded a bogey on 2, taking a two-shot lead. Nicklaus, however, could not separate himself from his challenger. After he hit his approach to 3 feet on 10, Aoki made a long putt from the fringe for a birdie. On the 17th Nicklaus holed a 22-footer for birdie while Aoki made his own 5-footer for birdie. And at the 18th Nicklaus rolled in another birdie from 10-feet to win the championship, his sixteenth major title as a professional.

Nicklaus' winning total of 272 established a new U.S. Open standard, breaking the record 275 he set in 1967 on the same Lower Course. He also tied Willie Anderson, Bobby Jones, and Ben Hogan by winning his fourth U.S. Open title. Nicklaus had failed to win a tournament in 1979 for the first time in his career, and at 40 many believed his best days were behind him. He won four more times on the PGA Tour with two majors, including the PGA Championship two months later and the Masters in 1986.

Seve Ballesteros, the reigning champion of the British Open and Masters, was late to the course on Friday, missed his tee time, and was disqualified; he had carded a 75 on Thursday.

The U.S. Open returned to the Lower Course in 1993, and the PGA Championship was played there in 2005 and in 2016.

== Course layout ==
Lower Course

Hole	1	2	3	4	5	6	7	8	9	Out	10	11	12	13	14	15	16	17	18	In	Total
Yards	465	377	438	194; 162	388	470	470	374	205	3,381; 3,349	454	428	193	393	409	430	216; 185	630	542	3,695; 3,664	7,076; 7,013
Par	4	4	4	3	4	4	4	4	3	34	4	4	3	4	4	4	3	5	5	36	70

Lengths of the course for previous major championships:

- 7,015 yards (6,415 m), par 70 - 1967 U.S. Open
- 7,027 yards (6,425 m), par 70 - 1954 U.S. Open
- 6,866 yards (6,278 m), par 72 - 1936 U.S. Open (Upper Course)
- 6,212 yards (5,680 m), par 74 - 1915 U.S. Open (Old Course)
- 6,003 yards (5,489 m), par - 1903 U.S. Open (Old Course)
  The Old Course was plowed under in 1918

== Round summaries ==
=== First round ===
Thursday, June 12, 1980

Place	Player	Score	To par
T1	(United States) Jack Nicklaus	63	−7
T1	(United States) Tom Weiskopf	63	−7
T3	(United States) Keith Fergus	66	−4
T3	(United States) Mark Hayes	66	−4
T3	(United States) Lon Hinkle	66	−4
T6	(United States) Raymond Floyd	67	−3
T6	(United States) Jay Haas	67	−3
T6	(United States) Calvin Peete	67	−3
T9	(Japan) Isao Aoki	68	−2
T9	(United States) Mark Lye	68	−2
T9	(United States) Andy North	68	−2
T9	(United States) Lee Trevino	68	−2

=== Second round ===
Friday, June 13, 1980

Place	Player	Score	To par
1	(United States) Jack Nicklaus	63-71=134	−6
T2	(Japan) Isao Aoki	68-68=136	−4
T2	(United States) Keith Fergus	66-70=136	−4
T2	(United States) Lon Hinkle	66-70=136	−4
T2	(United States) Mike Reid	69-67=136	−4
6	(United States) Mark Hayes	66-71=137	−3
T7	(United States) Pat McGowan	69-69=138	−2
T7	(United States) Tom Weiskopf	63-75=138	−2
T9	(United States) Peter Jacobsen	70-69=139	−1
T9	(United States) Tom Watson	71-68=139	−1

Amateurs: Hallberg (+2), Clampett (+6), Sigel (+7), Sindelar (+7), Wagner (+9), Wood (+10), Blake (+11), Sutton (+11), Rassett (+13), Sluman (+15), Clearwater (+16), Mudd (+16), Norton (+16), O'Meara (+16), Bergin (+17), Landers (+20), Chalas (+21), Glickley (+22).

=== Third round ===
Saturday, June 14, 1980

Place	Player	Score	To par
T1	(Japan) Isao Aoki	68-68-68=204	−6
T1	(United States) Jack Nicklaus	63-71-70=204	−6
3	(United States) Lon Hinkle	66-70-69=205	−5
T4	(United States) Keith Fergus	66-70-70=206	−4
T4	(United States) Mark Hayes	66-71-69=206	−4
T4	(United States) Tom Watson	71-68-67=206	−4
7	(United States) Craig Stadler	73-67-69=209	−1
T8	(United States) Mike Morley	73-68-69=210	E
T8	(United States) Lee Trevino	68-73-69=210	E
T10	(Australia) Bruce Devlin	71-70-70=211	+1
T10	(United States) Hubert Green	73-73-65=211	+1
T10	(United States) Jay Haas	67-74-70=211	+1
T10	(United States) Peter Jacobsen	70-69-72=211	+1
T10	(United States) Pat McGowan	69-69-73=211	+1
T10	(United States) Mike Reid	69-67-75=211	+1
T10	(United States) Bill Rogers	69-72-70=211	+1

=== Final round ===
Sunday, June 15, 1980

Place	Player	Score	To par	Money ($)
1	(United States) Jack Nicklaus	63-71-70-68=272	−8	55,000
2	(Japan) Isao Aoki	68-68-68-70=274	−6	29,500
T3	(United States) Keith Fergus	66-70-70-70=276	−4	17,400
T3	(United States) Lon Hinkle	66-70-69-71=276	−4	17,400
T3	(United States) Tom Watson	71-68-67-70=276	−4	17,400
T6	(United States) Mark Hayes	66-71-69-74=280	E	11,950
T6	(United States) Mike Reid	69-67-75-69=280	E	11,950
T8	(United States) Hale Irwin	70-70-73-69=282	+2	8,050
T8	(United States) Mike Morley	73-68-69-72=282	+2	8,050
T8	(United States) Andy North	68-75-72-67=282	+2	8,050
T8	(United States) Ed Sneed	72-70-70-70=282	+2	8,050

Amateurs: Gary Hallberg (+5), Bobby Clampett (+10).

==== Scorecard ====
Final round

Hole	1	2	3	4	5	6	7	8	9	10	11	12	13	14	15	16	17	18
Par	4	4	4	3	4	4	4	4	3	4	4	3	4	4	4	3	5	5
(United States) Nicklaus	−6	−6	−7	−6	−6	−6	−5	−5	−5	−6	−6	−6	−6	−6	−6	−6	−7	−8
(Japan) Aoki	−6	−5	−5	−4	−4	−4	−3	−4	−3	−4	−4	−4	−4	−4	−4	−4	−5	−6
(United States) Fergus	−4	−4	−3	−4	−4	−4	−5	−5	−5	−4	−4	−4	−4	−4	−4	−4	−3	−4
(United States) Hinkle	−5	−5	−5	−4	−4	−3	−3	−3	−3	−3	−3	−3	−3	−3	−3	−3	−3	−4
(United States) Watson	−3	−4	−4	−4	−4	−4	−4	−4	−3	−2	−2	−2	−2	−2	−2	−3	−3	−4
(United States) Hayes	−3	−3	−3	−2	−2	−2	−1	−1	E	−1	E	E	E	E	E	E	E	E
(United States) Reid	+1	+2	+2	+3	+3	+3	+3	+3	+3	+2	+2	+2	+2	+1	+1	+1	E	E

Cumulative tournament scores, relative to par

Birdie	Bogey
