= 1967 U.S. Open (golf) =

Coordinates: 40.705°N 74.328°W

Tournament information
- Dates: June 15–18, 1967
- Location: Springfield, New Jersey
- Course(s): Baltusrol Golf Club; Lower Course
- Organized by: USGA
- Tour: PGA Tour

Statistics
- Par: 70
- Length: 7,015 yards (6,415 m)
- Field: 150 players, 66 after cut
- Cut: 148 (+8)
- Prize fund: $169,400
- Winner's share: $30,000

Champion
- (United States) Jack Nicklaus
- 275 (−5)

Location in the United States
Location in New Jersey
Location in
Union County

The 1967 U.S. Open was the 67th U.S. Open, held June 15–18 at Baltusrol Golf Club in Springfield, New Jersey, west of New York City. Jack Nicklaus shot a final round 65 and established a new U.S. Open record of 275, four strokes ahead of runner-up Arnold Palmer, the 1960 champion. It was the second of Nicklaus' four U.S. Open titles and the seventh of his eighteen major championships.

Nicklaus' record score surpassed the 276 of Ben Hogan in 1948 at Riviera. His final round 65 (−5) tied the U.S. Open record for lowest final 18 holes, broken six years later by Johnny Miller at Oakmont. The 275 record stood for thirteen years, when Nicklaus broke it on the same course in 1980. For Palmer, it was his fourth runner-up finish at the U.S. Open in six years; the earlier three were in playoffs (1962, 1963, 1966). Hogan, age 54, played in his final major; he shot 72 in each of the first two rounds and tied for 34th place.

After winning the Masters in 1965 and 1966, Nicklaus missed the cut there two months earlier, which also kept him off the first Ryder Cup team for which he was eligible. (Other than a withdrawal in 1983, it was his only missed cut at Augusta from 1960–1993).

Lee Trevino, then a club pro from El Paso, finished fifth at Baltusrol in only his second major championship; he made the cut in his debut in 1966 at Olympic in San Francisco. The fifth place earnings of $6,000 allowed him to play in enough tournaments the rest of the 1967 season to earn his tour card for 1968. The high finish gave Trevino an exemption into the U.S. Open in 1968 at Oak Hill, which he won.

This was the fifth U.S. Open at Baltusrol and the second on the Lower Course; it previously hosted in 1954. The Upper Course was the site in 1936 and the defunct Old Course in 1903 and 1915. The U.S. Open returned in 1980, also won by Nicklaus, and its most recent appearance was in 1993. The PGA Championship was held at the Lower Course in 2005 and 2016.

With his seventh major won at age 27, Nicklaus went over three years before his next, at The Open Championship in 1970.

== Course layout ==
Lower Course

Hole	1	2	3	4	5	6	7	8	9	Out	10	11	12	13	14	15	16	17	18	In	Total
Yards	469	390	438	194	388	470	470	365	206	3,390	449	410	193	383	399	419	214	623	542	3,632	7,022
Par	4	4	4	3	4	4	4	4	3	34	4	4	3	4	4	4	3	5	5	36	70

Lengths of the course for previous major championships:

- 7,027 yards (6,425 m), par 70 - 1954 U.S. Open
- 6,866 yards (6,278 m), par 72 - 1936 U.S. Open (Upper Course)
- 6,212 yards (5,680 m), par 74 - 1915 U.S. Open (Old Course) The Old Course was plowed under in 1918
- 6,003 yards (5,489 m), par - 1903 U.S. Open (Old Course)

== Round summaries ==
=== First round ===
Thursday, June 15, 1967

Marty Fleckman, a 23-year-old amateur from Port Arthur, Texas, shot an opening round 67 to lead the field by two in his first U.S. Open.

Place	Player	Score	To par
1	(United States) Marty Fleckman (a)	67	−3
T2	(United States) Deane Beman	69	−1
T2	(United States) Billy Casper	69	−1
T2	(United States) Don January	69	−1
T2	(United States) Arnold Palmer	69	−1
T2	(South Africa) Gary Player	69	−1
T2	(United States) Chi-Chi Rodríguez	69	−1
T2	(United States) Art Wall Jr.	69	−1
T9	(United States) George Archer	70	E
T9	(United States) Gardner Dickinson	70	E
T9	(United States) Dutch Harrison	70	E
T9	(United States) Dave Marr	70	E
T9	(Australia) Kel Nagle	70	E

=== Second round ===
Friday, June 16, 1967

Place	Player	Score	To par
1	(United States) Arnold Palmer	69-68=137	−3
2	(United States) Jack Nicklaus	71-67=138	−2
3	(United States) Billy Casper	69-70=139	−1
T4	(United States) Deane Beman	69-71=140	E
T4	(Australia) Bruce Devlin	72-68=140	E
T4	(United States) Marty Fleckman (a)	67-73=140	E
7	(United States) Don January	69-72=141	+1
T8	(United States) George Archer	70-72=142	+2
T8	(United States) Miller Barber	71-71=142	+2
T8	(United States) Bob Hold	71-71=142	+2
T8	(Australia) Kel Nagle	70-72=142	+2
T8	(South Africa) Gary Player	69-73=142	+2
T8	(United States) Lee Trevino	72-70=142	+2
T8	(United States) Art Wall Jr.	69-73=142	+2

=== Third round ===
Saturday, June 17, 1967

With a one-under 69 on Saturday, amateur Fleckman was the surprise 54-hole leader, a stroke ahead of defending champion Billy Casper and former champions Nicklaus (1962) and Palmer (1960).

Place	Player	Score	To par
1	(United States) Marty Fleckman (a)	67-73-69=209	−1
T2	(United States) Billy Casper	69-70-71=210	E
T2	(United States) Jack Nicklaus	71-67-72=210	E
T2	(United States) Arnold Palmer	69-68-73=210	E
T5	(United States) Miller Barber	71-71-69=211	+1
T5	(United States) Deane Beman	69-71-71=211	+1
T5	(United States) Gardner Dickinson	70-73-68=211	+1
T5	(United States) Don January	69-72-70=211	+1
T9	(United States) Wes Ellis	74-69-70=213	+3
T9	(United States) Bob Goalby	72-71-70=213	+3
T9	(United States) Lee Trevino	72-70-71=213	+3

=== Final round ===
Sunday, June 18, 1967

Fleckman wilted under the pressure, shot a final round 80 (+10), and tied for 18th place. Alongside in the final pairing, Casper carded a 72 for 282 (+2), seven strokes behind in fourth place. The championship became a duel between Nicklaus and Palmer, in the penultimate pairing. Nicklaus birdied five of his first eight holes to open up a four-stroke advantage over Palmer, and that is how they finished. At the par-5 18th, Nicklaus played safe with a 1-iron off the tee, but it went right and required a recovery shot from the rough. The third shot was an uphill 230 yards (210 m) from the fairway with another 1-iron, then he sank the birdie putt from 22 feet (7 m) for the record. Fleckman held on for low amateur by a stroke over Bob Murphy, who shot 69.

Place	Player	Score	To par	Money ($)
1	(United States) Jack Nicklaus	71-67-72-65=275	−5	30,000
2	(United States) Arnold Palmer	69-68-73-69=279	−1	15,000
3	(United States) Don January	69-72-70-70=281	+1	10,000
4	(United States) Billy Casper	69-70-71-72=282	+2	7,500
5	(United States) Lee Trevino	72-70-71-70=283	+3	6,000
T6	(United States) Deane Beman	69-71-71-73=284	+4	4,166
T6	(United States) Gardner Dickinson	70-73-68-73=284	+4	4,166
T6	(United States) Bob Goalby	72-71-70-71=284	+4	4,166
T9	(United States) Dave Marr	70-74-70-71=285	+5	2,566
T9	(Australia) Kel Nagle	70-72-72-71=285	+5	2,566
T9	(United States) Art Wall Jr.	69-73-72-71=285	+5	2,566

=== Scorecard ===
Final round

Hole	1	2	3	4	5	6	7	8	9	10	11	12	13	14	15	16	17	18
Par	4	4	4	3	4	4	4	4	3	4	4	3	4	4	4	3	5	5
(United States) Nicklaus	E	+1	E	−1	−2	−1	−2	−3	−3	−2	−2	−2	−3	−4	−4	−4	−4	−5
(United States) Palmer	E	E	E	E	E	E	E	+1	+1	+1	+1	+1	+1	+1	+1	+1	E	−1

Cumulative tournament scores, relative to par
