= Patty Berg Award =

Golf award

The Patty Berg Award is an award given by the LPGA to an individual who "exemplifies diplomacy, sportsmanship, goodwill and contributions to the game of golf." It was first awarded in 1979 and is named after LPGA co-founder and golfer Patty Berg.

== Recipients ==
- 1979 Marilynn Smith
- 1980 Betsy Rawls
- 1981–1983 No award
- 1984 Ray Volpe
- 1985 Dinah Shore
- 1986 David Foster
- 1987 Kathy Whitworth
- 1988 John D. Laupheimer
- 1989 No award
- 1990 Patty Berg
- 1991 Karsten Solheim
- 1992 Judy Dickinson
- 1993 Kerry Graham
- 1994 Charles S. Mechem Jr.
- 1995 No award
- 1996 Suzanne Jackson
- 1997 Judy Bell
- 1998 No award
- 1999 Judy Rankin
- 2000 Louise Suggs
- 2001 Pat Bradley
- 2002 Patty Sheehan
- 2003 Annika Sörenstam
- 2004 No award
- 2005 Ty Votaw
- 2006–2007 No award
- 2008 Dolores Hope
- 2009 Juli Inkster
- 2010–2011 No award
- 2012 Nancy Lopez
- 2013 Peggy Kirk Bell
- 2014 Tom Maletis
- 2015 Shirley Spork
