= Blind item =

News story in a gossip column where subjects are anonymous

A blind item is a news story, typically in a gossip column, in which the details of the matter are reported while the identities of the people involved are not revealed. The invention of the blind item is credited to William d'Alton Mann (1839–1920), publisher of Town Topics, who often used it for blackmail. Communication privacy management theory relates to the ideas of information privacy, truthful reporting and expression of opinions that influence this form of communication.

In some blind items, cryptic clues or generic descriptions of the parties involved may be supplied to tease general readers or signal to closeknit communities of celebrities, socialites or insiders. The "reveal" is when the names of the anonymous parties are subsequently published. The advent of gossip websites has brought about more public debate and speculation about individual blind item stories, and also about the ethics surrounding the practice. Audiences might use blind item material as a shared topic of conversation with peers, and perhaps even as a conversational entry point to a sensitive topic that is personal to them.

== See also ==
- Circular sourcing
- Defamation
- Innuendo
- Roman à clef
- Rumor
- De-identification
- Anonymization
