= Baltusrol Golf Club =

Golf course in Springfield, New Jersey

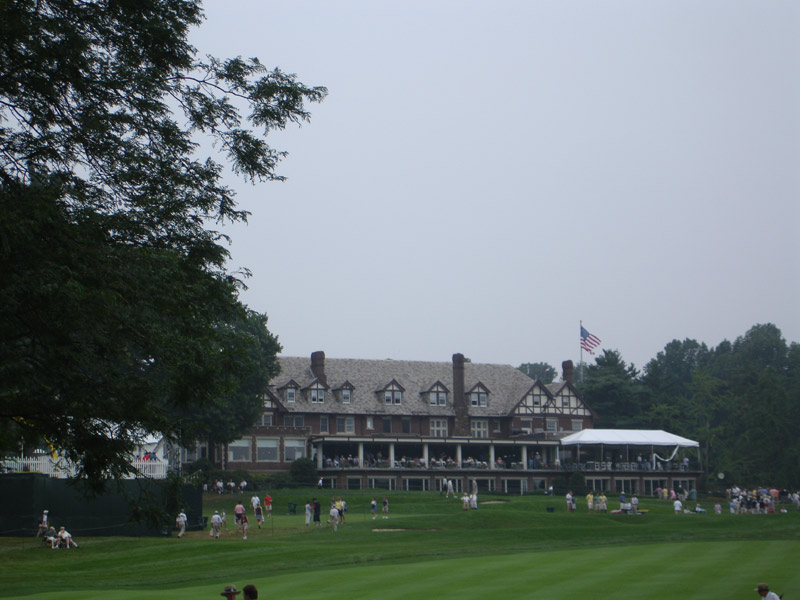
- Clubhouse during the 2005 PGA Championship

- Location within the United States Location within New Jersey

Club information
- Location: Springfield, New Jersey
- Elevation: 160 feet (50 m)
- Established: 1895, 131 years ago
- Type: Private
- Total holes: 36
- Tournaments: List of Major Tournaments: PGA Championship (2005, 2016); U.S. Open (1903, 1915, 1936, 1954, 1967, 1980, 1993); U.S. Women's Open (1961, 1985); U.S. Amateur (1904, 1926, 1946, 2000); U.S. Women's Amateur (1901, 1911); KPMG Women's PGA Championship (2023)
- Greens: Bentgrass / Poa annua
- Fairways: Bentgrass / Poa annua
- Website: baltusrol.org

Lower Course
- Designed by: A. W. Tillinghast (1922), Gil Hanse & Jim Wagner(2021 renovation)
- Par: 72 (70 for majors)
- Length: 7,575 yards (6,927 m)
- Course rating: 76.5
- Slope rating: 146

Upper Course
- Designed by: A. W. Tillinghast Gil Hanse & Jim Wagner (2023-2024 renovation)
- Par: 72
- Length: 7,435 yards (6,799 m)
- Course rating: 76.3
- Slope rating: 145
- Baltusrol Golf Club
- U.S. National Register of Historic Places
- U.S. National Historic Landmark District
- New Jersey Register of Historic Places
- Location within Union County, New Jersey
- Location: 201 Shunpike Road, Springfield, New Jersey
- Coordinates: 40.70091°N 74.33009°W
- Area: 474 acres (192 ha)
- Built: 1909: Clubhouse 1918–26: Courses
- Architect: Clubhouse: Chester H. Kirk Courses: A. W. Tillinghast
- Architectural style: Tudor Revival
- NRHP reference No.: 05000374
- NJRHP No.: 4233

Significant dates
- Added to NRHP: May 6, 2005
- Designated NHLD: August 25, 2014
- Designated NJRHP: March 17, 2005

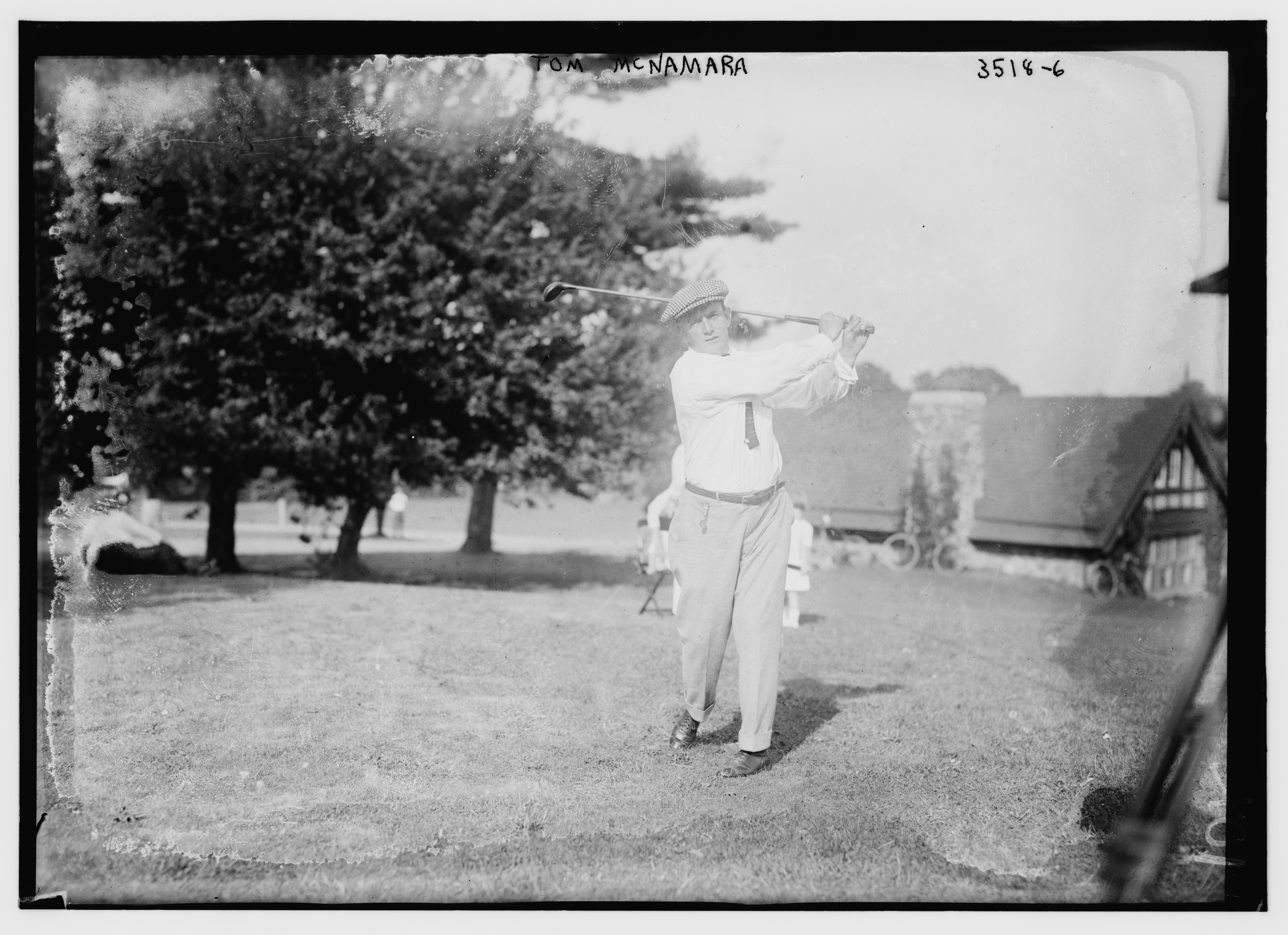
Tom McNamara at the 1915 U.S. Open

The Baltusrol Golf Club is a private 36-hole golf club in Springfield, New Jersey, United States, about twenty miles (30 km) west of New York City. It was founded 131 years ago in 1895 by Louis Keller.

In 1985, Baltusrol became the first club to have hosted both the U.S. Open and Women's U.S. Open on two different courses. Both courses were originally designed by A. W. Tillinghast in 1918. The club has been the site of seven U.S. Opens and two PGA Championships.

In 2005, the club was listed on the National Register of Historic Places. In 2014, it was further designated a National Historic Landmark in recognition of its importance to Tillinghast's career as a course designer.

== History ==
Baltusrol Golf Club was named after Baltus Roll (1769–1831), who farmed the land on which the club resides today. In 1831, he was murdered at age 61 on February 22 by two thieves who believed that he had hidden a small treasure in his farmhouse on Baltusrol mountain. Two men, Peter B. Davis and Lycidias Baldwin were suspected of the murder. Baldwin fled to a tavern in Morristown where he killed himself with an apparent overdose of narcotics. Davis was apprehended and stood trial in Newark. Despite the overwhelming but circumstantial evidence, much of which the trial judge ruled as inadmissible, Davis was acquitted of murder. He was, however, convicted of forgery and sentenced to 24 years in prison, and later died in Trenton State Prison.

The land was purchased in the 1890s by Louis Keller, who was the publisher of the New York Social Register. He owned 500 acres (2.0 km^{2}) of land in Springfield Township. On October 19, 1895, Keller announced that the Baltusrol Golf Club would open. The club's original 9-hole course was designed by George Hunter in 1895 and expanded to 18 holes in 1898. This course, which is called the Old Course, was further modified by George Low and no longer exists.

Keller hired A. W. Tillinghast to build a second golf course to complement the Old Course. However, Tillinghast recommended that the Old Course be plowed over and he would design and build two new courses. The club approved his design recommendation and commenced construction of the Upper and Lower courses in 1918. In August 1919, Golf Illustrated declared that "what they are planning at Baltusrol is on a vaster scale than anything that has ever been attempted in American Golf for the opening of the Dual Courses." The Dual Courses, or Upper and Lower, were the first contiguous 36-hole design built in America. Both courses officially opened for play in June 1922. In the years following their opening, refinements were made to prepare these courses for National Championship play. The first national championship held on the Lower was the 1926 U.S. Amateur. The first national championship on the Upper was the U.S. Open in 1936. Tillinghast served as the club's architect until his death in 1942.

In 1948, Robert Trent Jones was retained to update and lengthen the Lower course for tournament play. The Lower course was lengthened again by his son Rees Jones in 1992 in preparation for the U.S. Open in 1993. He also updated and lengthened the Upper course in advance of the 2000 U.S. Amateur. On both the Lower and Upper courses, Jones and his senior designer Steve Weisser reinstated and restored various Tillinghast design features which had been lost over the years. Some famous golfers to win tournaments at Baltusrol include Ed Furgol, Mickey Wright, Jack Nicklaus, Lee Janzen, and Phil Mickelson. In 1995, Golf Magazine recognized Baltusrol as one of "The First 100 Clubs in America."

== Clubhouse ==
In March 1909, the original clubhouse burned down. That same year, a new clubhouse was quickly designed by Chester Hugh Kirk, a member of the golf club, in a Tudor revival style and construction begun in June.

In 1912, it became the first clubhouse to host a President of the United States, William Howard Taft.

== Tournaments hosted ==
In its history, Baltusrol has hosted 16 USGA-sponsored championships and three PGA-sponsored Championships. It has hosted the U.S. Open seven times, in 1903, 1915, 1936, 1954, 1967, 1980, and 1993. It has hosted the U.S. Amateur four times, in 1904, 1926, 1946, and 2000. It has hosted the U.S. Women's Open twice, in 1961 and 1985, and the U.S. Women's Amateur twice, in 1901 and 1911. The 2005 PGA Championship was Baltusrol's first time hosting a PGA Championship, and it returned in 2016. The 69th Women's PGA Championship for 2023 and the 111th PGA Championship for 2029 were awarded to Baltusrol in a joint deal. Baltusrol was awarded the 146th U.S. Open in 2046, the eighth time the club will have hosted.

Year	Tournament	Course	Winner	Winning score	Winner's share ($)
2023	Women's PGA Championship	Lower Course	(China) Yin Ruoning	276 (−8)	1,500,000
2018	U.S. Junior Amateur	Medal play – Both; Match play – Upper	(United States) Michael Thorbjornsen	36th hole	N/A
**2016**	PGA Championship (2)	Lower Course	(United States) Jimmy Walker	266 (−14)	1,890,000
**2005**	PGA Championship	Lower Course	(United States) Phil Mickelson	276 (−4)	1,170,000
2000	U.S. Amateur (4)	Medal play – Both; Match play – Upper	(United States) Jeff Quinney	39th hole	N/A
**1993**	U.S. Open (7)	Lower Course	(United States) Lee Janzen	272 (−8)	290,000
1985	U.S. Women's Open (2)	Upper Course	(United States) Kathy Baker	280 (−8)	41,975
**1980**	U.S. Open	Lower Course	(United States) Jack Nicklaus	272 (−8)	55,000
**1967**	U.S. Open	Lower Course	(United States) Jack Nicklaus	275 (−5)	30,000
1961	U.S. Women's Open	Lower Course	(United States) Mickey Wright	293 (+5)	1,800
**1954**	U.S. Open	Lower Course	(United States) Ed Furgol	284 (+4)	6,000
1946	U.S. Amateur	Lower Course	(United States) Ted Bishop	37th hole	N/A
**1936**	U.S. Open	Upper Course	(United States) Tony Manero	282 (−6)	1,000
1926	U.S. Amateur	Lower Course	(United States) George Von Elm	2 & 1	N/A
**1915**	U.S. Open	Old Course	(United States) Jerome Travers (a)	297 (+1)	(300)
1911	U.S. Women's Amateur (2)	Old Course	(United States) Margaret Curtis	5 & 3	N/A
1904	U.S. Amateur	Old Course	(United States) Chandler Egan	8 & 6	N/A
**1903**	U.S. Open	Old Course	(Scotland) Willie Anderson	307	200
1901	U.S. Women's Amateur	Old Course	(United States) Genevieve Hecker	5 & 3	N/A

Bolded years are major championships on the PGA Tour

== Course information ==
The Upper and Lower courses are very different, being built on two distinct geological formations. Tillinghast designed them as "Dual Courses" which were to be "equally sought after as a matter of preference." The Lower is spread out over rolling parkland, the remains of a terminal moraine deposited during the last glaciation about 18,000 years ago. The Upper runs along a ridgeline known as Baltusrol Mountain, the east side of the First Watchung Mountain (Orange Mountain) that was formed from vast lava flows about 200 million years ago. Both courses have ponds and other man-made and natural hazards that come into play. On the Lower Course, the 4th hole and the 18th hole have ponds, and on the Upper Course, the 9th and the 13th holes have ponds. The 10th, 13th, and 15th holes have creeks in play. As of 2010, Baltusrol Golf Club holds the distinction of being the only two-course club to ever host both the U.S. Men's and Women's Open Championships on both of its courses.

=== Lower Course ===
The Lower course from the black tees measures 7,400 yards (6,767 m) and is a par 72, but for the 2005 PGA Championship, the course measured 7,392 yards (6,759 m) and was par 70. From the blue tees, the course measures 7,015 yards (6,415 m) and is par 72. From the green tees, the course measures 6,652 yards and is par 72. From the white tees, the course measures 6,325 yards (5,784 m) and is par 72. From the red tees, the course measures 5,539 yards (5,065 m) and is par 73. In its listing of the "Top 100 Courses in the U.S.", GOLF Magazine selected the Lower Course as 22nd in 1995, 1997, and 1999.

The three signature holes of the Lower Course are the fourth, a par three of 194 yards (177 m) where the player must hit his or her ball over the pond to a two-tiered green; the seventeenth, a par five of 650 yards (590 m) where John Daly is the only player to ever reach the green in two strokes (later, Tiger Woods fired his second shot over the green in two shots at the 2005 PGA Championship); and the eighteenth, a par five of 533 yards (487 m) famous for spectacular performances by Furgol, Nicklaus, Mickelson and Jason Day.

- Scorecard

Tee	Rating/Slope	1	2	3	4	5	6	7	8	9	Out	10	11	12	13	14	15	16	17	18	In	Total
Ⅵ	M:76.5 / 146	495	375	510	200	425	485	495	420	205	3,610	460	435	235	470	455	460	240	655	555	3,965	7,575
Ⅴ	M:74.6 / 142	485	365	470	180	400	465	485	380	205	3,435	440	425	215	425	405	415	210	625	540	3,700	7,135
Ⅳ	M:72.4 / 138	475	360	435	155	370	415	480	360	195	3,245	430	395	180	400	385	380	180	550	520	3,420	6,665
Ⅲ	M:70.5 / 135 W:76.2 / 144	470	350	400	135	360	375	465	350	180	3,085	380	355	155	360	375	370	160	495	490	3,140	6,225
Ⅱ	M:66.7 / 126 W:71.2 / 133	455	290	325	115	315	320	455	345	135	2,755	320	345	145	305	330	335	110	425	360	2,675	5,430
Ⅰ	M:64.8 / 122 W:69.3 / 128	440	290	325	75	270	320	385	285	125	2,515	320	320	95	305	295	300	110	380	390	2,485	5,000
Par		5	4	4	3	4	4	5	4	3	36	4	4	3	4	4	4	3	5	5	36	72
SI	Men's	17	11	3	13	7	1	9	5	15		4	8	18	2	12	10	16	6	14
SI	Women's	11	15	5	13	1	7	9	3	17		10	4	12	14	8	2	18	6	16

=== Upper Course ===
From the black tees the Upper course is a par 72, 7,348 yards (6,719 m), blue tees par 72, 7,002 yards (6,403 m), green tees par 72, 6,558 yards (5,997 m), white tees par 72, 6,232 yards (5,699 m), red tees par 73, 5,819 yards (5,321 m), gold tees par 73, 5,540 yards (5,070 m). The Upper Course has hosted three of the club's national championships including the 1936 U.S. Open. GOLF Magazine's "Top 100 Courses in the U.S." selected the Upper Course 89th in 1997 and 74th in 1999.

- Scorecard

Tee	Rating/Slope	1	2	3	4	5	6	7	8	9	Out	10	11	12	13	14	15	16	17	18	In	Total
Ⅵ	M:76.3 / 145	530	460	240	440	450	450	250	545	355	3,720	170	615	360	435	410	170	445	600	510	3,715	7,435
Ⅴ	M:74.3 / 140	485	420	220	405	420	430	215	540	345	3,480	160	590	345	400	405	155	435	565	465	3,520	7,000
Ⅳ	M:72.1 / 134	470	410	180	385	395	405	190	505	320	3,260	150	545	330	365	380	140	380	525	435	3,250	6,510
Par		5	4	3	4	4	4	3	5	4	36	3	5	4	4	4	3	4	5	4	36	72
Ⅲ	M:70.0 / 129 W:75.8 / 139	450	395	160	335	385	375	180	470	290	3,040	130	485	320	350	365	130	370	450	420	3,020	6,060
Ⅱ	M:67.7 / 124 W:73.0 / 133	445	365	150	280	350	360	145	435	285	2,815	120	445	300	335	310	110	295	425	420	2,760	5,575
Par	Men's Women's	5 5	4 4	3 3	4 4	4 4	4 4	3 3	5 5	4 4	36 36	3 3	5 5	4 4	4 4	4 4	3 3	4 4	5 5	4 5	36 37	72 73
Ⅰ	M:65.2 / 120 W:69.7 / 128	380	305	130	280	310	300	95	435	230	2,465	120	445	230	290	310	85	295	425	340	2,540	5,005
Par	Men's Women's	5 5	4 4	3 3	4 4	4 4	4 4	3 3	5 5	3 4	35 36	3 3	5 5	4 4	4 4	4 4	3 3	4 4	5 5	4 5	36 37	71 73
SI	Men's	9	3	13	7	11	1	15	5	17		16	6	12	10	2	18	8	14	4
SI	Women's	15	3	13	7	9	1	11	5	7		10	14	4	8	2	18	6	12	16

== General information ==
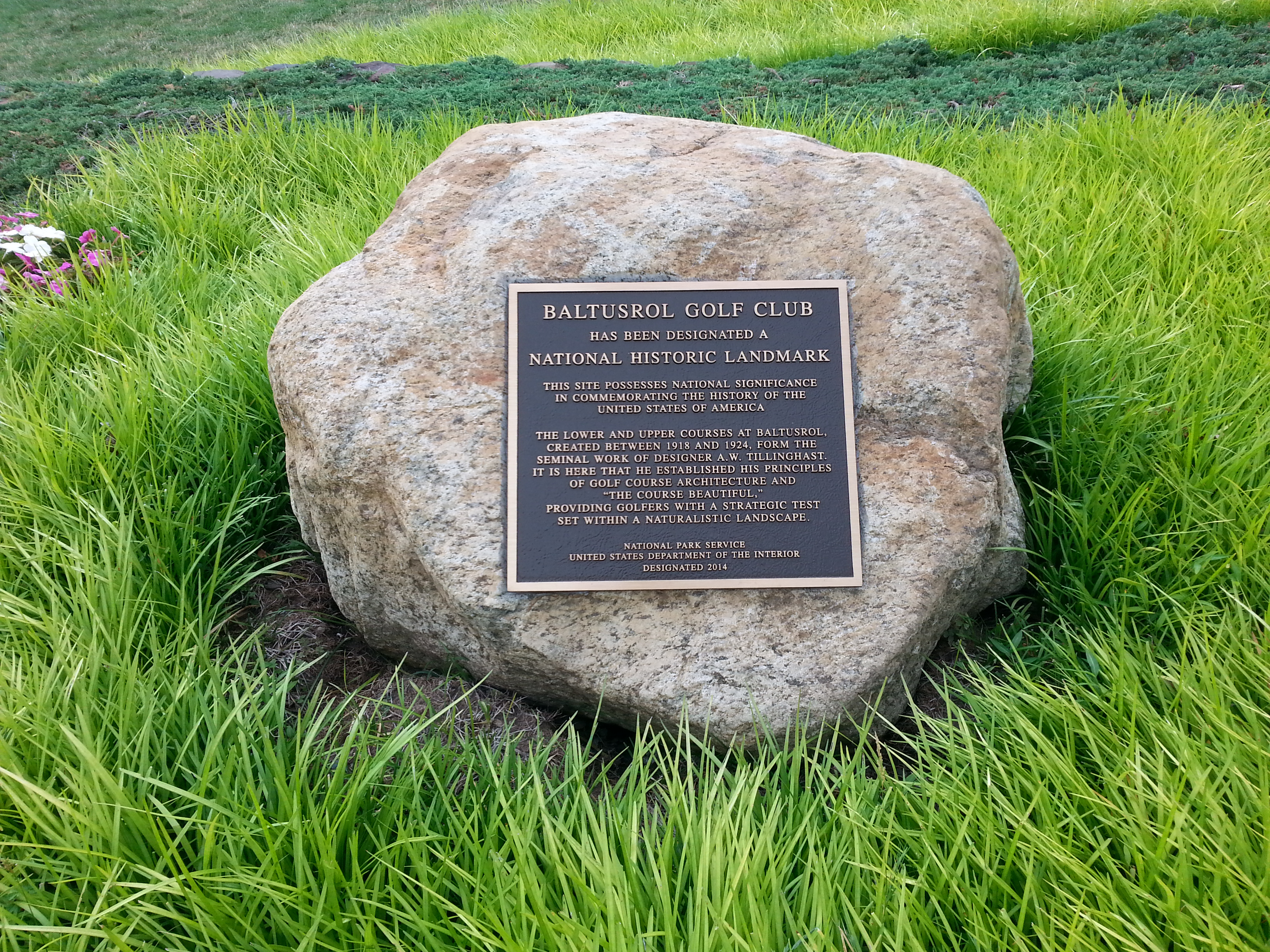
Marker identifying Baltusrol Golf Club as a National Historic Landmark in 2014.

The pro shop is open from 7:00 A.M. to 7:00 P.M. The course is not open to the public. Guests are permitted to play with a member. The dress code states that denim is not allowed and that a collared shirt is required. Metal spiked shoes and fivesomes are not allowed. Moreover, cellphone use is not permitted on the course or on club grounds except in one's car. The course is open year-round. Players are required to use a caddy between the hours of 7 am and 2 pm. The fairways and greens are poa annua and bent grass. The greens are aerated in late March to early April, late August, and November after the season ends, and there is overseeding of Penn A4 Bentgrass. The rough is Kentucky Bluegrass.

== Audubon certification ==
Audubon International has designated the Baltusrol Golf Club a Certified Audubon Cooperative Sanctuary. First bestowed to Baltusrol in 1999, Audubon International recognizes that Baltusrol manages its lands with concern to the environment. Audubon International uses criteria of environmental planning, wildlife and habitat management, chemical usage reduction and safety, water conservation, and water quality management.

== See also ==
- List of National Historic Landmarks in New Jersey
- National Register of Historic Places listings in Union County, New Jersey
