= Louis Keller =

- Born: Louis Keller; February 27, 1857; New York City, U.S.
- Died: February 16, 1922 (aged 64); New York City, U.S.
- Occupations: Publisher, golf club owner, railroad owner
- Known for: Founding the Baltusrol Golf Club; Founding publisher of the Social Register

Louis Keller (February 27, 1857 – February 16, 1922) was an American publisher, social arbiter of high society, and golf club owner. He was the founder of Baltusrol Golf Club in New Jersey and the first publisher of the Social Register.

== Early life and education ==
Keller was born February 27, 1857 in New York City, the youngest of three children, to Charles M. Keller (1810–1874), an attorney, and Heloise Keller (née de Chazournes; 1823–1890), of French aristocracy. He had two older half-sisters; Alice Keller (born 1842) and Mary Keller (born 1844).

The Keller family was originally from Switzerland. His Swiss-born grandfather, Jonas Keller (1769–1830), a machinist, emigrated to New York City in May of 1816. The following year, he ultimately settled in Washington, D.C, operating the short-lived Washington Stocking Knit Factory, which ultimately went bankrupt. In 1822, was appointed by John Quincy Adams, then Secretary of State, to take charge of the Patent Office's model room. His son, Charles M. Keller, was a prominent attorney, who drafted the Patent Act of 1836 and served the first Commissioner of Patents. He ultimately married Heloise de Chazournes, who hailed from French aristocracy.

Despite their social prominence they were not fully accepted by New York society mainly since they were Catholics and a too recent arrival in America. They retained an apartment at 128 Madison Avenue and also owned a dairy farm in Springfield, New Jersey. Keller never went to prepatory school or college.

== Career ==
As a young adult, he was indecisive about starting a career. His attempt to reinvent himself as a gentleman farmer proved to be a failure. Instead, he took on the tradition of hosting an annual picnic on his family farm in Springfield, New Jersey, where he invited many members of high society. The event received extensive coverage in publications about high society each year. Indeed, the guest list was reprinted in those publications.

In 1885, he published a gossip newspaper about high society, Town Topics. Two years later, in 1887, he published the first issue of the Social Register. The publication was loosely based on the registry for the Metropolitan National Horse Show, held at the original Madison Square Garden on Madison Avenue and East 26th Street since 1883, listing its attendees and directors. It was copyrighted, thus forbidding anyone from publishing the entire list and making it more secret and exclusive. It was far more inclusive than Ward McAllister's "Four Hundred," the number, reputedly, that could be accommodated in the ballroom of Mrs. William Astor (Caroline Webster Schermerhorn Astor).

Through his associations with members of high society, he realized many of them were learning how to play golf. As a result, in 1895, he founded the Baltusrol Golf Club on his family farm. The name came from a friend who owned a farm called "Baltusroll Way," named after farmer Baltus Roll (1769–1831). The golf course was designed by George Hunter, an Englishman. The club hosted championships of the United States Golf Association (USGA) in 1901, 1903 and 1904. However, the clubhouse burned down on March 27, 1909. It was rebuilt that same year, to the design of architect Chester Kirk. In 1915, the club hosted the U.S. Open. In 1916, Keller purchased more land to expand the golf course. Two years later, in 1918, Keller hired A. W. Tillinghast to build a second golf course to complement the Old Course. However, Tillinghast recommended that the Old Course be plowed over, and he went on to design and build two new courses, which were called the Upper and the Lower.

In order to provide better transportation to Baltusrol Golf Club, Keller became a partner in the New Orange Four Junction Railroad, which became the Rahway Valley Railroad in 1904. The railroad, based in New Orange, NJ (now Kenilworth), was extended to Summit, NJ in 1906, with a station a short walk from the golf club's main gate. The Rahway Valley Railroad became one of the more successful short line railroads in the United States, operated by Mr. Keller's estate following his death in 1922, until it was sold to Delaware Otsego Corporation in 1986.

He was a member of the (now defunct) Calumet Club of New York City and the Metropolitan Club of Washington, D.C., two social clubs. He was also a member of the Metropolitan Golf Association and the New Jersey State Golf Association.

== Personal life ==
He resided at 12 West 56th Street. In Who Killed Society?, Cleveland Amory said he was "uninterested in girls, had a curious looking drooping moustache, and spoke in a squeaky affected voice."

He died of an intestinal ailment on February 16, 1922, at the French Hospital in New York City. He was 67 years old. At the time of his death, he was a resident of Springfield at the Baltusrol Golf Club.
