= William d'Alton Mann =

American journalist

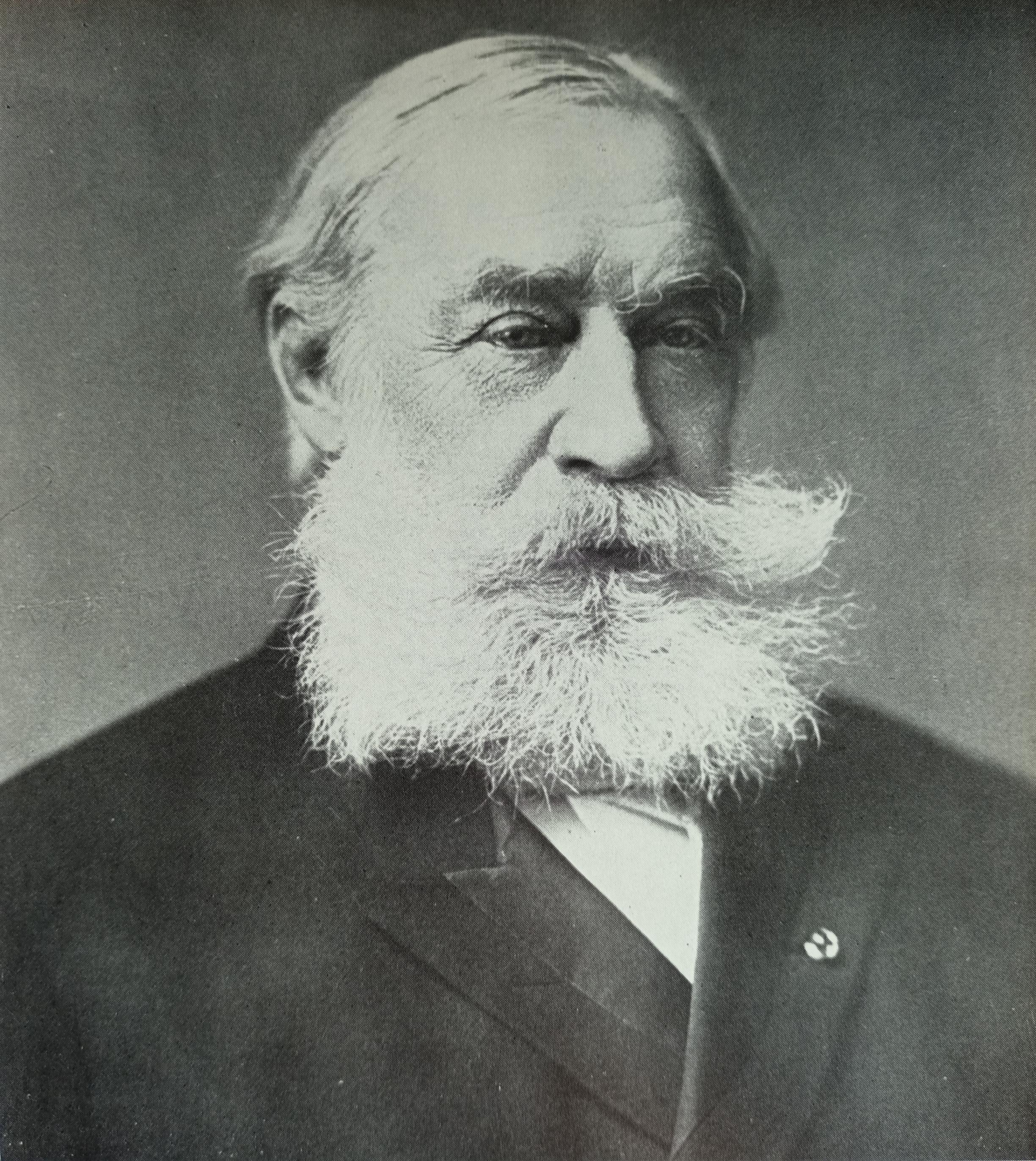
- Born: September 27, 1839; Sandusky, Ohio, U.S.
- Died: May 17, 1920 (aged 80); Morristown, New Jersey, U.S.
- Occupations: Military officer; businessman; politician; publisher
- Political party: Democratic
- Spouse: Mary E. Marks (m. 1864; died 1899)

William d'Alton Mann (September 27, 1839 – May 17, 1920) was a Union officer in the American Civil War, a businessman, and a newspaper and magazine publisher.

== Early life ==
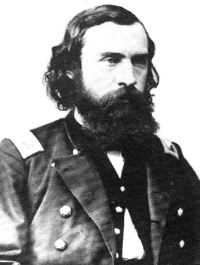
Col. William D. Mann

He was born in Sandusky, Ohio, on September 27, 1839.

== Career ==
During the Civil War, Mann enlisted in the 1st Michigan Cavalry and was elected as a captain on August 22, 1861. He later became the lieutenant colonel of the 5th Michigan Cavalry on August 14, 1862. Then, in the late summer of 1862, he raised and organized the 7th Michigan Cavalry and was promoted to its colonel on February 9, 1863. He fought at Gettysburg under George Armstrong Custer. Following the war, he was a member of the Military Order of the Loyal Legion of the United States.

=== Life after the war ===
After the war, he lived in Mobile, Alabama, where he pioneered developments in the manufacture of cotton seed oil. He ran for U.S. Congress as a Democrat and received a majority of votes, but never took his seat because the "Federal authorities denied him a certificate". In 1871, he moved to New York City where he developed Mann's Boudoir Car, a railroad sleeping car. He went to Europe and spent many years promoting the car, which was sold to the Pullman Company.

In his later years, he became the publisher of the Mobile Register as well as several popular magazines in the New York City area, including The Smart Set, and Town Topics. The credibility of the latter was undermined by Mann's tacit admission in civil court to allowing robber barons to purchase immunity from unwanted coverage in the paper. "In 1906 The New York Times noted that Mann had received what he described as loans from a number of millionaires, including $25,000 from William K. Vanderbilt."

== Personal life ==
In 1864, he married, as his second wife, Mary E. Marks (1841–1899), a daughter of Samuel Abram Headly Marks and Anne (née Holroyd) Marks. He was the father of Emma Mann, who married Harold R. Vynne, a son of Charles Vynne of Carlisle, England, in 1896.

His New York residence was 302 West 72nd Street in Manhattan. Mann died at his country home, 156 Madison Avenue, Morristown, New Jersey, on May 17, 1920, from complications from influenza. He was buried at Woodlawn Cemetery, Bronx. His estate was divided amongst family and friends, but led to a number of lawsuits.

=== Legacy ===
He has been given credit for the invention of the "blind item".

The Swiss-born American artist Adolfo Müller-Ury began a portrait of Mann in the middle of October 1902. When finished, Town Topics commented favorably on the portrait of its proprietor in its November 27, 1902 edition, writing: "... Mr. Ury's friends will be pleased to note that his work has broadened a great deal in recent months. His portrait of Colonel Mann, particularly, is rendered with considerable freedom and vigor, and in this respect is the best work that the artist has produced. The portrait is fair in color, a good likeness — although the mouth is perhaps unnecessarily severe — and the downy quality of the white hair and beard is especially well painted..." The portrait was exhibited at the Noe Art Galleries, on Fifth Avenue, between January 5 and 19, 1903.
