= 1985 U.S. Women's Open =

Coordinates: 40.705°N 74.328°W

Tournament information
- Dates: July 11–14, 1985
- Location: Springfield, New Jersey
- Courses: Baltusrol Golf Club, Upper Course
- Organized by: USGA
- Tour: LPGA Tour

Statistics
- Par: 72
- Length: 6,274 yards (5,737 m)
- Field: 153 players, 62 after cut
- Cut: 151 (+7)
- Prize fund: $250,000
- Winner's share: $41,975

Champion
- (United States) Kathy Baker
- 280 (−8)

Location in the United States
Location in Union County, New Jersey

The 1985 U.S. Women's Open was the 40th U.S. Women's Open, held July 11–14 at the Upper Course of Baltusrol Golf Club, in Springfield, New Jersey, west of New York City.

Kathy Baker, 24, won her first LPGA Tour event and only major title, three strokes ahead of runner-up Judy Clark (later Dickinson). Baker (later Guadagnino) held the lead after 54 holes at 210 (−6), one stroke ahead of Clark and 36-hole leader Nancy Lopez.

The 153-player field included 24 amateurs.

The Upper Course previously hosted the U.S. Open in 1936, won by Tony Manero. The U.S. Women's Open in 1961 was played on the more renowned Lower Course, where Mickey Wright won the third of her four titles.

== Final leaderboard ==
Sunday, July 14, 1985

| Place | Player | Score | To par | Money ($) |
|---|---|---|---|---|
| 1 | (United States) Kathy Baker | 70-72-68-70=280 | −8 | 41,975 |
| 2 | (United States) Judy Clark | 71-75-65-72=283 | −5 | 21,700 |
| 3 | (United States) Vicki Alvarez | 72-69-71-75=287 | −1 | 16,800 |
| T4 | (United States) Janet Coles | 72-69-71-76=288 | E | 10,854 |
| T4 | (United States) Nancy Lopez | 70-70-71-77=288 | E | 10,854 |
| T6 | (United States) Sally Little | 73-70-74-72=289 | +1 | 7,498 |
| T6 | (Australia) Penny Pulz | 75-74-70-70=289 | +1 | 7,498 |
| T8 | (United States) Jane Geddes | 74-75-69-72=290 | +2 | 5,893 |
| T8 | (United States) Betsy King | 71-73-71-75=290 | +2 | 5,893 |
| T8 | (Japan) Ayako Okamoto | 72-74-73-71=290 | +2 | 5,893 |
