= Town Topics (magazine) =

Defunct New York publication

Town Topics: The Journal of Society was a magazine published in New York City by William d'Alton Mann and others from 1879 to 1937 (v. 1-105, no. 56). Title varies: Andrew's American Queen; Art, Music, Literature and Society (Jan. 1879-Sept. 16, 1882); and American Queen (Sept. 23, 1882-Feb. 21, 1885)

The magazine had begun life some years earlier as The American Queen, edited by Louis Keller, the founder of the Social Register, and "dedicated to art, music, literature, and society." Under Mann, however, it ripened into a scandal sheet, faithfully reporting high-society peccadilloes and often identifying perpetrators by name. It was possible for the wealthy public figures to delay or bury a story by buying some advertising in the newspaper. The main method it used was to print an innocuous article with the name of the individual on which it had a piece of hot gossip. On the other side of the page would be a blind piece going into the scandal without the name of the person involved. By running the article giving identification and the scandal separately it was possible for Mann to avoid liability for extortion, libel and slander.

The publication was responsible for the divorce of Emily Post from her husband, Edwin in 1906, when the magazine's most popular feature, titled “Saunterings," exposed Mr. Post's affair with another woman.
