= 1954 U.S. Open (golf) =

Coordinates: 40.705°N 74.328°W

Tournament information
- Dates: June 17–19, 1954
- Location: Springfield, New Jersey
- Course(s): Baltusrol Golf Club; Lower Course
- Organized by: USGA
- Tour: PGA Tour

Statistics
- Par: 70
- Length: 7,027 yards (6,425 m)
- Field: 159 players, 50 after cut
- Cut: 151 (+11)
- Prize fund: $23,280
- Winner's share: $6,000

Champion
- (United States) Ed Furgol
- 284 (+4)

Location in the United States
Location in New Jersey
Location in
Union County

The 1954 U.S. Open was the 54th U.S. Open, held June 17–19 at Baltusrol Golf Club in Springfield, New Jersey, west of New York City. On the Lower Course, Ed Furgol won his only major title, one stroke ahead of runner-up Gene Littler.

Littler owned the 36-hole lead by two strokes over defending champion Ben Hogan and Furgol. After a 76 in the third round, Littler fell three strokes back of Furgol, who shot a 71 to take a one-stroke lead over Dick Mayer. Hogan made four bogeys at the first six holes and fell out of contention with a 76.

In the final round on Saturday afternoon, Littler rebounded with a 70, but it was not enough. Furgol was helped by a great recovery on the 18th. After hitting his drive into the trees, he played his escape shot onto the 18th fairway of Baltusrol's other course. From there he managed to make par, carding a 72 for a 284 total. Mayer was tied with Furgol as he played 18, but he double-bogeyed the hole to fall into third.

This U.S. Open was the first to be nationally televised, one hour of the final round, carried by NBC. It was also the first in which ropes were used to control the gallery, and prize money was increased by 20% over the previous year. This was the fourth U.S. Open at Baltusrol, but the first on the Lower Course, which later hosted in 1967, 1980, and 1993.

== Course layout ==
Lower Course

Hole	1	2	3	4	5	6	7	8	9	Out	10	11	12	13	14	15	16	17	18	In	Total
Yards	465	379	444	183	391	467	468	372	204	3,373	450	421	190	391	409	427	201	620	545	3,654	7,027
Par	4	4	4	3	4	4	4	4	3	34	4	4	3	4	4	4	3	5	5	36	70

Lengths of the courses for previous major championships at Baltusrol:

- 6,866 yards (6,278 m), par 72 - 1936 U.S. Open (Upper Course)
- 6,212 yards (5,680 m), par 74 - 1915 U.S. Open (Old Course) The Old Course was plowed under in 1918
- 6,003 yards (5,489 m), par - 1903 U.S. Open (Old Course)

== Round summaries ==
=== First round ===
Thursday, June 17, 1954

Place	Player	Score	To par
1	(United States) Billy Joe Patton (a)	69	−1
T2	(United States) Ted Kroll	70	E
T2	(United States) Gene Littler	70	E
T2	(United States) Bob Toski	70	E
T5	(United States) Ed Furgol	71	+1
T5	(United States) Ben Hogan	71	+1
T5	(United States) Al Mengert	71	+1
T8	(United States) Tommy Bolt	72	+2
T8	(United States) Leland Gibson	72	+2
T8	(United States) Lloyd Mangrum	72	+2
T8	(United States) Dick Mayer	72	+2
T8	(United States) Cary Middlecoff	72	+2
T8	(United States) Johnny Revolta	72	+2
T8	(United States) Sam Snead	72	+2
T8	(United States) Robert Watson	72	+2
T8	(United States) Lew Worsham	72	+2

=== Second round ===
Friday, June 18, 1954

Place	Player	Score	To par
1	(United States) Gene Littler	70-69=139	−1
T2	(United States) Ed Furgol	71-70=141	+1
T2	(United States) Ben Hogan	71-70=141	+1
T4	(United States) Lloyd Mangrum	72-71=143	+3
T4	(United States) Dick Mayer	72-71=143	+3
T4	(United States) Al Mengert	71-72=143	+3
T4	(United States) Cary Middlecoff	72-71=143	+3
T8	(United States) Tommy Bolt	72-72=144	+4
T8	(United States) Dick Chapman (a)	77-67=143	+4
T8	(South Africa) Bobby Locke	74-70=144	+4
T8	(United States) Bob Toski	70-74=144	+4

=== Third round ===
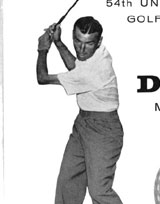
Ed Furgol in 1954

Saturday, June 19, 1954 (morning)

Place	Player	Score	To par
1	(United States) Ed Furgol	71-70-71=212	+2
2	(United States) Dick Mayer	72-71-70=213	+3
T3	(United States) Gene Littler	70-69-76=215	+5
T3	(United States) Lloyd Mangrum	72-71-72=215	+5
T3	(United States) Cary Middlecoff	72-71-72=215	+5
T6	(United States) Al Mengert	71-72-73=216	+6
T6	(United States) Billy Joe Patton (a)	69-76-71=216	+6
T8	(United States) Tommy Bolt	72-72-73=217	+7
T8	(United States) Fred Haas	73-73-71=217	+7
T8	(United States) Jay Hebert	77-70-70=217	+7
T8	(United States) Ben Hogan	71-70-76=217	+7
T8	(United States) Sam Snead	72-73-72=217	+7

=== Final round ===
Saturday, June 19, 1954 (afternoon)

Place	Player	Score	To par	Money ($)
1	(United States) Ed Furgol	71-70-71-72=284	+4	6,000
2	(United States) Gene Littler	70-69-76-70=285	+5	3,600
T3	(United States) Lloyd Mangrum	72-71-72-71=286	+6	1,500
T3	(United States) Dick Mayer	72-71-70-73=286	+6	1,500
5	(South Africa) Bobby Locke	74-70-74-70=288	+8	960
T6	(United States) Tommy Bolt	72-72-73-72=289	+9	570
T6	(United States) Fred Haas	73-73-71-72=289	+9	570
T6	(United States) Ben Hogan	71-70-76-72=289	+9	570
T6	(United States) Shelley Mayfield	73-75-72-69=289	+9	570
T6	(United States) Billy Joe Patton (a)	69-76-71-73=289	+9	0

(a) denotes amateur
