= Judy Dickinson =

American professional golfer (born 1950)

Personal information
- Nationality: United States
- Born: March 4, 1950 (age 76) Akron, Ohio, U.S.
- Height: 5 ft 4 in (1.63 m)
- Spouses: Gardner Dickinson (m. 1985-1998, his death)

Career
- Sport: Golf
- College: Maryville College; Akron University; Glassboro State College
- Turned professional: 1977
- Current tour: Legends Tour
- Former tour: LPGA Tour (1978–2000)
- Professional wins: 5

Number of wins by tour
- LPGA Tour: 4
- LPGA of Korea Tour: 1

Best results in LPGA major championships
- Chevron Championship: 3rd: 1985
- Women's PGA C'ship: T5: 1996
- U.S. Women's Open: 2nd: 1985
- du Maurier Classic: 2nd: 1992

Achievements and awards
- William and Mousie Powell Award: 1990
- Patty Berg Award: 1992

Judy Dickinson (born March 4, 1950) is an American professional golfer. She played on the LPGA Tour.

== Career ==
Dickinson won four times on the LPGA Tour< between 1985 and 1992. She served as president of the LPGA from 1990 to 1992.

== Personal life ==
She competed as Judy Clark from 1978 until her marriage to PGA Tour golfer Gardner Dickinson in late 1985.

== Awards and honors ==
- In 1990, she won the William and Mousie Powell Award which goes to a player "whose behavior and deeds best exemplifies the spirit, ideals and values of the LPGA."
- In 1992, she won the Patty Berg Award, another award bestowed by the LPGA given to a player who demonstrates good sportsmanship through her career.

== Professional wins (5) ==
=== LPGA Tour wins (4) ===
No.	Date	Tournament	Winning score	Margin of victory	Runner(s)-up
1	Jul 21, 1985	Boston Five Classic	–8 (75-66-68-71=280)	3 strokes	(United States) Donna Caponi (United States) Jane Geddes
2	Jun 22, 1986	Rochester International	–7 (74-69-68-70=281)	1 stroke	(United States) Pat Bradley
3	Sep 14, 1986	Safeco Classic	–14 (71-73-63-67=274)	4 strokes	(United States) Hollis Stacy
4	Mar 8, 1992	Inamori Classic	–11 (69-69-69-70=277)	2 strokes	(United States) Meg Mallon

LPGA Tour playoff record (0–1)

No.	Year	Tournament	Opponents	Result
1	1992	Sun-Times Challenge	(United States) Beth Daniel (United States) Dottie Mochrie	Mochrie won with par on sixth extra hole Daniel eliminated by par on fourth hole

=== LPGA of Korea Tour wins (1) ===
- 1992 Lady Seoul Open
