= 1993 U.S. Open (golf) =

Coordinates: 40.705°N 74.328°W

Tournament information
- Dates: June 17–20, 1993
- Location: Springfield, New Jersey
- Courses: Baltusrol Golf Club, Lower Course
- Tour: PGA Tour

Statistics
- Par: 70
- Length: 7,152 yards (6,540 m)
- Field: 156 players, 88 after cut
- Cut: 144 (+4)
- Prize fund: $1,600,000
- Winner's share: $290,000

Champion
- (United States) Lee Janzen
- 272 (−8)

Location in the United States
Location in New Jersey
Location in
Union County

The 1993 U.S. Open was the 93rd U.S. Open, held June 17–20 at Baltusrol Golf Club in Springfield, New Jersey, west of New York City. Lee Janzen shot all four rounds in the 60s and tied the U.S. Open scoring record to win the first of his two U.S. Open titles, two strokes ahead of runner-up Payne Stewart.

Janzen's total of 272 tied the U.S. Open scoring record set by Jack Nicklaus in 1980, also at Baltusrol. It was the third consecutive time at Baltusrol that the scoring record was tied or broken. Nicklaus also won in 1967 with a 275, one stroke better than Ben Hogan's 276 at Riviera in 1948. Janzen joined Lee Trevino as the only champion to post all four rounds under 70; Trevino shot 275 in 1968, a quarter century earlier. (Rory McIlroy became the third in 2011 and set the scoring record.)

== Course layout ==
Lower Course

Hole	1	2	3	4	5	6	7	8	9	Out	10	11	12	13	14	15	16	17	18	In	Total
Yards	470	381	466	194; 162	413	470	470	374	205	3,443; 3,411	454	428	193	401	415	430	216; 180	630	542	3,709; 3,673	7,152; 7,084
Par	4	4	4	3	4	4	4	4	3	34	4	4	3	4	4	4	3	5	5	36	70

Lengths of the course for previous major championships:

- 7,076 yards (6,470 m), par 70 - 1980 U.S. Open
- 7,015 yards (6,415 m), par 70 - 1967 U.S. Open
- 7,027 yards (6,425 m), par 70 - 1954 U.S. Open
- 6,866 yards (6,278 m), par 72 - 1936 U.S. Open (Upper Course)
- 6,212 yards (5,680 m), par 74 - 1915 U.S. Open (Old Course)
- 6,003 yards (5,489 m), par - 1903 U.S. Open (Old Course)
  The Old Course was plowed under in 1918

== Round summaries ==
=== First round ===
Thursday, June 17, 1993

Place	Player	Score	To par
T1	(United States) Scott Hoch	66	−4
T1	(Australia) Craig Parry	66	−4
T1	(United States) Joey Sindelar	66	−4
T4	(United States) Lee Janzen	67	−3
T4	(United States) Craig Stadler	67	−3
T6	(United States) Fred Couples	68	−2
T6	(United States) Raymond Floyd	68	−2
T6	(United States) Blaine McCallister	68	−2
T6	(United States) Rocco Mediate	68	−2
T6	(United States) Corey Pavin	68	−2
T6	(United States) Mike Smith	68	−2
T6	(United States) Robert Wrenn	68	−2

=== Second round ===
Friday, June 18, 1993

Place	Player	Score	To par
1	(United States) Lee Janzen	67-67=134	−6
T2	(United States) Payne Stewart	70-66=136	−4
T2	(United States) Tom Watson	70-66=136	−4
T4	(United States) Corey Pavin	68-69=137	−3
T4	(Zimbabwe) Nick Price	71-66=137	−3
6	(United States) Scott Hoch	66-72=138	−2
T7	(United States) Billy Andrade	72-67=139	−1
T7	(United States) Paul Azinger	71-68=139	−1
T7	(United States) Fred Couples	68-71=139	−1
T7	(United States) Bob Gilder	70-69=139	−1
T7	(United States) Jeff Maggert	69-70=139	−1
T7	(United States) Mike Standly	70-69=139	−1

Amateurs: Leonard (E), Berganio (+10), Oh (+15).

=== Third round ===
Saturday, June 19, 1993

Place	Player	Score	To par
1	(United States) Lee Janzen	67-67-69=203	−7
2	(United States) Payne Stewart	70-66-68=204	−6
3	(Zimbabwe) Nick Price	71-66-70=207	−3
T4	(United States) Paul Azinger	71-68-69=208	−2
T4	(United States) David Edwards	70-72-66=208	−2
T6	(United States) John Adams	70-70-69=209	−1
T6	(United States) Fred Funk	70-72-67=209	−1
T6	(United States) Wayne Levi	71-69-69=209	−1
T6	(Australia) Craig Parry	66-74-69=209	−1
T6	(United States) Mike Standly	70-69-70=209	−1
T6	(United States) Tom Watson	70-66-73=209	−1

=== Final round ===
Sunday, June 20, 1993

Janzen began the final round with a one-shot lead over Stewart. He kept the lead at the turn, but at the 10th his drive settled in thick rough and behind trees. Somehow Janzen's approach went through the branches and found the green, where he made par. He eventually lost sole possession of the lead, however, after three-putting at the 12th. A birdie at 14 put Janzen back on top, and after finding trouble at 16, his 30-foot (9 m) chip found the hole for another birdie. After Stewart missed a lengthy putt for birdie, Janzen held a two-shot lead with just two to play. At the 17th hole, Janzen's drive hit a tree and deflected back into the fairway. Both players made par, and at the last Janzen hit a 4-iron approach to set up another birdie and seal the victory.

Place	Player	Score	To par	Money ($)
1	(United States) Lee Janzen	67-67-69-69=272	−8	290,000
2	(United States) Payne Stewart	70-66-68-70=274	−6	145,000
T3	(United States) Paul Azinger	71-68-69-69=277	−3	78,556
T3	(Australia) Craig Parry	66-74-69-68=277	−3	78,556
T5	(United States) Scott Hoch	66-72-72-68=278	−2	48,730
T5	(United States) Tom Watson	70-66-73-69=278	−2	48,730
T7	(South Africa) Ernie Els	71-73-68-67=279	−1	35,481
T7	(United States) Raymond Floyd	68-73-70-68=279	−1	35,481
T7	(United States) Fred Funk	70-72-67-70=279	−1	35,481
T7	(United States) Nolan Henke	72-71-67-69=279	−1	35,481

Amateur: Justin Leonard (+8)

==== Scorecard ====
Final round

Hole	1	2	3	4	5	6	7	8	9	10	11	12	13	14	15	16	17	18
Par	4	4	4	3	4	4	4	4	3	4	4	3	4	4	4	3	5	5
(United States) Janzen	−7	−6	−7	−7	−7	−7	−6	−6	−6	−6	−6	−5	−5	−6	−6	−7	−7	−8
(United States) Stewart	−5	−5	−5	−5	−5	−5	−4	−4	−5	−5	−5	−5	−5	−5	−5	−5	−5	−6
(United States) Azinger	−1	−2	−3	−3	−3	−2	−1	−1	−1	−1	−2	−2	−2	−2	−2	−2	−2	−3
(Australia) Parry	−1	−1	−1	E	−1	−1	−1	−1	−1	−1	+1	+1	E	−1	−1	−1	−2	−3
(United States) Hoch	+1	+2	+2	+2	+2	+2	+1	+1	+1	+1	+1	+1	+1	+1	+1	E	−1	−2
(United States) Watson	E	+2	+2	+2	+1	+1	E	E	E	E	E	E	−1	−1	−1	−1	−2	−2
(Zimbabwe) Price	−3	−3	−3	−2	−2	−2	−1	−2	−2	−1	E	E	+1	+1	+1	E	E	E

Cumulative tournament scores, relative to par

Birdie	Bogey	Double bogey
