= South Florida Bible College & Theological Seminary =

Christian Bible college in Florida, United States

- Motto: Quality Education At An Affordable Price
- Type: Private | Non-profit
- Established: 1985
- Academic affiliations: ABHE
- President: Mary Drabik
- Administrative staff: 21
- Students: 743
- Location: Deerfield Beach, Florida, United States; 26°18′11″N 80°8′4″W
- Campus: Urban
- Colours: Blue and White
- Website: sfbc.edu

South Florida Bible College & Theological Seminary (SFBC or SFBC&TS) is a private Christian bible college and seminary in Deerfield Beach, Florida, United States. It offers undergraduate degrees and graduate degrees. In 2024, the Seminary had 743 students and offered four Masters courses.

== History ==
South Florida Bible College & Theological Seminary was founded by Joseph Guadagnino in 1985 while he was the pastor of Christian Love Fellowship in Deerfield Beach. Bob Boutwell served as chairman of the board from 1985 until 2016. Marv Wilson is presently chairman of the board.

In 2013, the university became fully accredited under the Association for Biblical Higher Education (ABHE).

Joseph Guadagnino was the president of the college until 2016. He presided over the institution when it received its initial accreditation in 2012. He is now Chancellor. Guadagnino was a pastor for over 25 years. During his presidency, enrollment remained about 75–100 students. The school moved in 2011 and to its present building in the fall of 2017. The university has expanded from about 75 students in 2014 to over 500 in 2017. Mary Drabik, formerly vice president, is the current president of the college in 2024. Josiah Stephan, the grandson of Guadagnino, is vice president.

== Academics ==
South Florida Bible College & Theological Seminary offers undergraduate, graduate, and doctoral degrees. These degree programs are available online or on campus. As of August 2019, South Florida Bible College offered over 20 total programs, on campus and online. There are 10 graduate programs including 2 doctoral programs offered on campus.

College of Biblical & Theological Studies

The South Florida Bible College of Biblical & Theological Studies includes three different departments and offers masters, bachelors, and associate degrees.

College of Business Administration & Management

The South Florida Bible College of Business Administration & Management includes two different departments and offers bachelors and associate degrees.

College of Christian Counseling

The South Florida Bible College of Christian Counseling includes two different departments and offers masters and bachelor's degrees.

College of Ministry & Leadership

The South Florida Bible College of Ministry & Leadership includes four different departments and offers doctoral, masters, bachelors, and associate degrees.

College of Psychology

The South Florida Bible College of Psychology includes two different departments and bachelors and associate degrees.

== Accreditation ==
SFBC was founded in 1985 and received The Association for Biblical Higher Education (ABHE) accreditation in 2013, which was most recently reaffirmed in 2018. In addition, ABHE is an officially recognized "faith-based" accrediting agency by the Council for Higher Education Accreditation (CHEA) and is a part of a global network that relates to regional or continental higher educational agencies through the International Council for Evangelical Theological Education. SFBC is officially recognized by the U.S. Department of Education. The counseling program, is approved by the American Psychological Association (APA) to offer Continuing Education (CE) credits for psychologists. SFBC is listed as a Certified Vocational Rehabilitation Vendor (that is, approved to provide educational and training services) under the authority of the Florida Department of Education. SFBC is licensed by the State of Florida's Commission for Independent Education, Florida Department of Education. SFBC is also accredited by Association of Christian Schools International (ACSI) and is on the list of Recognized Collegiate Programs with ACSI to offer CEU credits.
