= 1903 U.S. Open (golf) =

Coordinates: 40.705°N 74.328°W

Tournament information
- Dates: June 26–29, 1903
- Location: Springfield, New Jersey
- Course(s): Baltusrol Golf Club; Old Course (no longer exists)
- Organized by: USGA
- Format: Stroke play − 72 holes

Statistics
- Length: 6,003 yards (5,489 m)
- Field: 85
- Cut: none
- Winner's share: $200

Champion
- (Scotland) Willie Anderson
- 307, playoff

Location in the United States
Location in New Jersey

The 1903 U.S. Open was the ninth U.S. Open, held June 26–29 at Baltusrol Golf Club in Springfield, New Jersey, west of New York City. Willie Anderson won the second of his four U.S. Open titles in a playoff over David Brown. The championship was played on the original course at Baltusrol, now known as the Old Course, which no longer exists.

Anderson led after each of the first three rounds, with a six-shot lead after 54 holes, but carded 82 in the final round on Saturday afternoon. Brown's 76 equaled them at 307 total, eight strokes clear of the field. The playoff was moved to Monday because Sunday was reserved for member play, and was played in a heavy rainstorm. Anderson took a two-stroke lead at the turn, but Brown managed to tie after 14. At the next hole, Brown made a seven after his tee shot went out of bounds, but Anderson only gained a single stroke after three-putting for a six. At 16, Brown made a six to Anderson's five, and both made fours on the last two holes; Anderson ended at 82, two shots ahead.

Anderson had won in 1901 and was the first to win the U.S. Open twice; it was the first of three consecutive titles, a feat yet to be repeated. His four U.S. Open wins set a record which has been equaled by three others: Bobby Jones, Ben Hogan, and Jack Nicklaus.

Donald Ross, who would become known as one of the greatest golf course architects, designing several courses that hosted future U.S. Opens, had his best U.S. Open finish with a 5th place showing. Baseball Hall of Famer John Montgomery Ward played in his first of two U.S. Opens here, finishing in 56th place.

The Old Course at Baltusrol hosted the U.S. Open again a dozen years later in 1915, then was plowed under three years later in 1918 by course architect A. W. Tillinghast to create the Upper and Lower Courses.

== Round summaries ==
=== First round ===
Friday, June 26, 1903 (morning)

Place	Player	Score
1	(Scotland) Willie Anderson	73
2	(Scotland) Laurie Auchterlonie	75
T3	(Scotland) Jack Campbell	76
T3	(United States) Jack Hobens	76
T5	(Scotland) Findlay Douglas (a)	77
T5	(Scotland) Stewart Gardner	77
T5	(Scotland) Alex Smith	77
T8	(United States) George Tuttle Brokaw (a)	78
T8	William Norton	78
T10	(Scotland) David Brown	79
T10	(Scotland) Alex Campbell	79
T10	(Scotland) Donald Ross	79

=== Second round ===
Friday, June 26, 1903 (afternoon)

Place	Player	Score
1	(Scotland) Willie Anderson	73-76=149
T2	(Scotland) Laurie Auchterlonie	75-79=154
T2	(Scotland) Stewart Gardner	77-77=154
T2	(Scotland) Alex Smith	77-77=154
T5	(Scotland) David Brown	79-77=156
T5	(Scotland) Findlay Douglas (a)	77-79=156
7	(United States) Jack Hobens	76-81=157
8	(Scotland) Donald Ross	79-79=158
T9	(Scotland) Jack Campbell	76-83=159
T9	William Norton	78-81=159
T9	(England) Horace Rawlins	82-77=159

=== Third round ===
Saturday, June 27, 1903 (morning)

Place	Player	Score
1	(Scotland) Willie Anderson	73-76-76=225
2	(Scotland) David Brown	79-77-75=231
3	(Scotland) Alex Smith	77-77-81=235
T4	(Scotland) Stewart Gardner	77-77-82=236
T4	(Scotland) Donald Ross	79-79-78=236
6	(England) Horace Rawlins	82-77-78=237
T7	(Scotland) Laurie Auchterlonie	75-79-84=238
T7	(Scotland) Findlay Douglas (a)	77-79-82=238
9	(United States) Jack Hobens	76-81-82=239
10	(United States) Isaac Mackie	83-80-78=241

=== Final round ===
Saturday, June 27, 1903 (afternoon)

Place	Player	Score	Money ($)
T1	(Scotland) Willie Anderson	73-76-76-82=307	Playoff
T1	(Scotland) David Brown	79-77-75-76=307	Playoff
3	(Scotland) Stewart Gardner	77-77-82-79=315	125
4	(Scotland) Alex Smith	77-77-81-81=316	100
5	(Scotland) Donald Ross	79-79-78-82=318	80
6	(Scotland) Jack Campbell	76-83-83-77=319	70
7	(Scotland) Laurie Auchterlonie	75-79-84-83=321	50
8	(Scotland) Findlay Douglas (a)	77-79-82-84=322	0
T9	(United States) Jack Hobens	76-81-82-84=323	33
T9	(Scotland) Alex Ross	83-82-78-80=323	33
T9	(Scotland) Willie Smith	80-81-83-79=323	33

Amateurs: Douglas (322), Reinhart (325), Travis (326), Brokaw (333),
Croker (348), Carnegie (353), Kellogg (356), Gillespie (357),
Tappin (359), Watson (360), Ward (363), McDonald (372).

=== Playoff ===
Monday, June 29, 1903

Place	Player	Score	Money ($)
1	(Scotland) Willie Anderson	42-40=82	200
2	(Scotland) David Brown	42-42=84	150
