= Southern Hills (disambiguation) =

Southern Hills Country Club is a golf course in Tulsa, Oklahoma.

Southern Hills may also refer to:

- Southern Hills, a region of the Black Hills in South Dakota
- Southern Hills, Roanoke, Virginia, a neighborhood
- Southern Hills Mall, Sioux City, Iowa
- Southern Hills Hospital & Medical Center, Spring Valley, Nevada
- Southern Hills Counseling Center, Southwestern Indiana
- Southern Hills Aquifer, southeastern Louisiana
- Southern Hills Formation, Newfoundland
- Southern Hills Athletic Conference, Ohio

== See also ==
- South Hills (disambiguation)
