= 2022 PGA Championship =

104th PGA Championship

Tournament information
- Dates: May 19–22, 2022
- Location: Tulsa, Oklahoma; 36.074°N 95.957°W
- Course: Southern Hills Country Club
- Organized by: PGA of America
- Tours: PGA Tour; European Tour; Japan Golf Tour

Statistics
- Par: 70
- Field: 156 players, 79 after cut
- Cut: 144 (+4)
- Prize fund: US$15,000,000
- Winner's share: US$2,700,000

Champion
- (United States) Justin Thomas
- 275 (−5), playoff
- Location in the United States Location in Oklahoma

The 2022 PGA Championship was a professional golf tournament, held May 19–22 at Southern Hills Country Club in Tulsa, Oklahoma. It was the 104th PGA Championship. This was the fifth PGA Championship at Southern Hills and its eighth major championship. The event was originally scheduled to be played at Trump National Golf Club Bedminster in New Jersey, but was moved to Southern Hills following the January 6 United States Capitol attack.

Defending champion Phil Mickelson withdrew from the tournament amid controversy over his remarks about LIV Golf. It was the first time he had missed the PGA Championship since 1992, and the first time the defending champion did not play since 2008, when Tiger Woods was sidelined after knee surgery.

Justin Thomas defeated Will Zalatoris in a three-hole aggregate playoff to win his second PGA Championship (2017). Thomas came from seven shots behind at the start of the final round to win, tying the largest comeback in PGA Championship history. Mito Pereira, the 54-hole leader in his first PGA Championship appearance, led by one shot playing the 72nd hole before hitting his drive into a water hazard and making a double-bogey to finish a shot out of the playoff.

This was the first major championship to go to a playoff since the 2017 Masters, a span of 19 consecutive majors, the longest in history.

This year's purse was increased 25% to $15 million, with a winner's share of $2.7 million.

== Venue ==
Course layout

Hole	1	2	3	4	5	6	7	8	9	Out	10	11	12	13	14	15	16	17	18	In	Total
Yards	468	500	472	377	656	214	489	251	391	3,818	441	173	456	632	230	417	527	371	491	3,738	7,556
Par	4	4	4	4	5	3	4	3	4	35	4	3	4	5	3	4	4	4	4	35	70

Yardage by round

Round	Hole	1	2	3	4	5	6	7	8	9	Out	10	11	12	13	14	15	16	17	18	In	Total
1st	Yards	476	508	453	367	665	218	484	249	390	3,810	420	165	461	628	221	405	532	371	490	3,693	7,503
2nd	Yards	481	487	459	366	660	214	485	224	395	3,771	434	178	451	636	228	426	521	370	471	3,715	7,486
3rd	Yards	470	504	450	373	656	218	493	224	385	3,773	417	168	452	531	222	413	523	296	498	3,520	7,293
Final	Yards	480	489	459	368	623	218	492	255	396	3,780	434	178	468	541	232	408	524	302	490	3,577	7,357
Par		4	4	4	4	5	3	4	3	4	35	4	3	4	5	3	4	4	4	4	35	70

Southern Hills had previously hosted the PGA Championship in 1970, 1982, 1994, and 2007; it also hosted the U.S. Open in 1958, 1977, and 2001.

== Field ==
The field for the PGA Championship is sometimes regarded as the strongest in professional golf, routinely having the highest "strength of field rating" of the year according to the Official World Golf Ranking. A number of qualification criteria are used to determine the field, which includes past PGA champions, recent major winners, top finishers in the 2021 PGA Championship, Ryder Cup players, tournament and leading money winners on the PGA Tour, and twenty PGA club or teaching professionals. The PGA of America also issue invitations to players outside of these criteria, which is generally seen to include the top-100 in the world rankings.

=== Criteria ===
This list details the qualification criteria for the 2022 PGA Championship and the players who qualified under them; any additional criteria under which players qualified is indicated in parentheses.

1. All past winners of the PGA Championship (list excludes those not expected to play)

- Rich Beem
- Keegan Bradley (10)
- John Daly
- Jason Day
- Jason Dufner
- Pádraig Harrington (8)
- Martin Kaymer
- Brooks Koepka (3,8,10,11,12)
- Rory McIlroy (5,10,11,12)
- Shaun Micheel
- Collin Morikawa (4,8,10,11,12)
- Justin Thomas (5,10,11,12)
- Tiger Woods (2)
- Yang Yong-eun
- Davis Love III, (Note: Davis Love III withdrew; he was replaced by Adam Schenk.) Phil Mickelson (8,10), (Note: Phil Mickelson withdrew; he was replaced by Charl Schwartzel.) Vijay Singh, and Jimmy Walker (Note: Jimmy Walker and Kazuki Higa withdrew; they were replaced by Beau Hossler and Brendan Steele.) did not play.

2. Recent winners of the Masters Tournament (2018–2022)

- Dustin Johnson (10,11)
- Hideki Matsuyama (10,12)
- Patrick Reed (10)
- Scottie Scheffler (8,10,11,12)

3. Recent winners of the U.S. Open (2017–2021)

- Jon Rahm (8,10,11,12)
- Gary Woodland (10)
- Bryson DeChambeau (10,11) (Note: Bryson DeChambeau withdrew due to an ongoing wrist injury and was replaced by Denny McCarthy.) did not play.

4. Recent winners of The Open Championship (2016–2021)

- Shane Lowry (8,10,11)
- Francesco Molinari
- Jordan Spieth (10,11,12)
- Henrik Stenson

5. Recent winners of The Players Championship (2019–2022)

- Cameron Smith (10,12)

6. Winner of the 2020 Olympic Games

- Xander Schauffele (10,11,12)

7. Current Senior PGA Champion

- Alex Čejka

8. The leading 15 players, and those tying for 15th place, in the 2021 PGA Championship

- Abraham Ancer (10,12)
- Tony Finau (10,11,12)
- Rickie Fowler
- Harry Higgs
- Louis Oosthuizen (10)
- Justin Rose
- Kevin Streelman
- Will Zalatoris (10)
- Paul Casey (10,11) (Note: Paul Casey withdrew due to an ongoing back injury; he was replaced by Russell Knox.) did not play.

9. The leading 20 players in the 2022 PGA Professional Championship

- Alex Beach
- Brandon Bingaman
- Michael Block
- Matt Borchert
- Tyler Collet
- Paul Dickinson
- Tim Feenstra
- Austin Hurt
- Colin Inglis
- Nic Ishee
- Jared Jones
- Sean McCarty
- Kyle Mendoza
- Jesse Mueller
- Dylan Newman
- Zac Oakley
- Casey Pyne
- Ryan Vermeer
- Shawn Warren
- Wyatt Worthington II

10. Top 70 from special money list on the PGA Tour from the 2021 AT&T Byron Nelson to the 2022 Wells Fargo Championship

- Daniel Berger (11)
- Sam Burns (12)
- Patrick Cantlay (11,12)
- Cameron Champ (12)
- Corey Conners
- Cameron Davis (12)
- Matt Fitzpatrick (11)
- Lucas Glover (12)
- Talor Gooch (12)
- Branden Grace
- Adam Hadwin
- Brian Harman
- Tyrrell Hatton (11)
- Russell Henley
- Lucas Herbert (12)
- Garrick Higgo (12)
- Tom Hoge (12)
- Max Homa (12)
- Billy Horschel
- Viktor Hovland (11,12)
- Mackenzie Hughes
- Matt Jones
- Kim Si-woo
- Kevin Kisner (12)
- Jason Kokrak (12)
- Anirban Lahiri
- Lee Kyoung-hoon (12)
- Marc Leishman
- Luke List (12)
- Maverick McNealy
- Troy Merritt
- Keith Mitchell
- Sebastián Muñoz
- Kevin Na
- Joaquín Niemann (12)
- Alex Norén
- Séamus Power (12)
- Adam Scott
- J. J. Spaun (12)
- Sepp Straka (12)
- Hudson Swafford (12)
- Cameron Tringale
- Erik van Rooyen (12)
- Harold Varner III
- Jhonattan Vegas
- Aaron Wise
- Cameron Young
- Harris English (11,12) (Note: Harris English withdrew due to his ongoing recovery from hip surgery; he was replaced by Kramer Hickok.) and Im Sung-jae (12) (Note: Im Sung-jae withdrew as he was unable to travel after testing positive for COVID-19 a week earlier; he was replaced by Scott Stallings.) did not play.

11. Playing members of the 2021 Ryder Cup teams, who are ranked within the top 100 on the Official World Golf Ranking as of May 9, 2022

- Tommy Fleetwood
- Sergio García
- Ian Poulter
- Lee Westwood
- Bernd Wiesberger

12. Winners of official tournaments on the PGA Tour from the 2021 PGA Championship until the start of the championship (Note: A place in the field was reserved for the winner of the AT&T Byron Nelson, held the week prior to the championship; with Lee Kyoung-hoon already exempt, the place went to Joel Dahmen.)

- Ryan Brehm
- Chad Ramey

13. PGA of America invitees (Note: The PGA of America usually invites all players ranked inside the top 100 of the Official World Golf Ranking. Ten players with a world ranking of over 100 on May 9, 2022 were given invitations; nine of these had rankings between 101 and 116, while Johnson was ranked 245.)

- Adri Arnaus
- Oliver Bekker
- Christiaan Bezuidenhout
- Richard Bland
- Dean Burmester
- Laurie Canter
- Stewart Cink
- Ryan Fox
- Justin Harding
- Nicolai Højgaard
- Sam Horsfield
- Rikuya Hoshino
- Yuki Inamori
- Zach Johnson
- Sadom Kaewkanjana
- Takumi Kanaya
- Kim Bi-o
- Chan Kim
- Tom Kim
- Ryosuke Kinoshita
- Chris Kirk
- Jinichiro Kozuma
- Pablo Larrazábal
- Min Woo Lee
- Robert MacIntyre
- Shaun Norris
- Carlos Ortiz
- Ryan Palmer
- Mito Pereira
- Thomas Pieters
- Webb Simpson
- Daniel van Tonder
- Bubba Watson
- Kazuki Higa was invited but did not play.

14. If necessary, the field is completed by players in order of PGA Championship points earned (per 10)

- Lanto Griffin
- Matt Kuchar
- Patton Kizzire
- Matthew Wolff
- Davis Riley

Alternates who gained entry (per category 14):

- Brendan Steele (78)
- Beau Hossler (79)
- Kramer Hickok (80)
- Charl Schwartzel (81)
- Adam Schenk (84)
- Russell Knox (85)
- Scott Stallings (86)
- Joel Dahmen (87)
- Denny McCarthy (89)

== Round summaries ==
=== First round ===
Thursday, May 19, 2022

Two-time champion Rory McIlroy shot 65 (−5), his lowest round in his PGA Championship career, to take a one-shot lead over Tom Hoge and Will Zalatoris. Beginning his round on the 10th hole, McIlroy birdied four holes in a row on his first nine and did not make a bogey until the sixth hole, his 15th. He finished the round by making an 18-foot putt for birdie on the ninth, taking the first-round lead at a major championship for the first time since the 2014 Open Championship and first after any round since winning the 2014 PGA Championship.

Hoge made only one bogey to go with five birdies, while Zalatoris birdied three of his first four holes to equal Hoge's four-under 66. 2017 champion Justin Thomas was even-par making the turn after bogeys on holes eight and nine before making three birdies on the back-nine to shoot 67 (−3), the lowest score in the afternoon.

World No. 1 and Masters champion Scottie Scheffler eagled the par-5 fifth hole to go two-under on his round but made four bogeys on the back-nine to finish with a one-over 71. Tiger Woods was two-under through five holes before making seven bogeys the rest of his round, finishing at four-over 74.

Place	Player	Score	To par
1	(Northern Ireland) Rory McIlroy	65	−5
T2	(United States) Tom Hoge	66	−4
T2	(United States) Will Zalatoris	66	−4
T4	(Mexico) Abraham Ancer	67	−3
T4	(United States) Matt Kuchar	67	−3
T4	(United States) Justin Thomas	67	−3
T7	(England) Matt Fitzpatrick	68	−2
T7	(Australia) Lucas Herbert	68	−2
T7	(United States) Chris Kirk	68	−2
T7	(United States) Kevin Na	68	−2
T7	(Chile) Joaquín Niemann	68	−2
T7	(Chile) Mito Pereira	68	−2
T7	(United States) Davis Riley	68	−2
T7	(United States) Xander Schauffele	68	−2
T7	(Australia) Cameron Smith	68	−2

=== Second round ===
Friday, May 20, 2022

Will Zalatoris shot a bogey-free round of 65 (−5) to take a one-shot lead over Mito Pereira at nine-under. Zalatoris birdied three holes in a row on his back-nine to get to eight-under for the tournament. At the par-4 17th hole, after his drive went into the trees to the right of the fairway, Zalatoris hit his approach to seven feet and made the putt for sole possession of the 36-hole lead.

Pereira, playing in just his second major championship and first PGA Championship, was two-under on his round at the turn before making four birdies on his second nine. He had a six-foot birdie putt on the ninth (his 18th) to shoot 63 but missed, settling for a six-under 64 to finish at eight-under.

Playing in the more difficult morning conditions, Justin Thomas birdied the ninth (also his 18th) for a second consecutive round of 67 (−3). At six-under for the tournament, he held the lead as he finished his round before being passed by Zalatoris and Pereira in the afternoon.

Bubba Watson made nine birdies in a tournament-record round of 63 (−7), narrowly missing a 22-foot putt on the 18th for the first 62 in PGA Championship history. He was the third player to shoot 63 in a major at Southern Hills, along with Raymond Floyd in 1982 and Tiger Woods in 2007. He finished at five-under and in fourth place.

Overnight leader Rory McIlroy made two bogeys on the front-nine and didn't make a birdie until the 12th, settling for a one-over 71 to fall back to a tie for fifth place at four-under. Woods, in the same group with McIlroy, double-bogeyed the 11th hole after hitting a chip shot over the green into a bunker to fall to five-over and outside the cutline, but he rebounded with birdies at the 13th and 16th to finish at three-over and make the cut by two shots.

The 36-hole cut came at 144 (+4) and better; 79 players advanced to the weekend. Notables to miss the cut included World No. 1 Scottie Scheffler, the reigning Masters champion, and two-time major champion Dustin Johnson.

Place	Player	Score	To par
1	(United States) Will Zalatoris	66-65=131	−9
2	(Chile) Mito Pereira	68-64=132	−8
3	(United States) Justin Thomas	67-67=134	−6
4	(United States) Bubba Watson	72-63=135	−5
T5	(Mexico) Abraham Ancer	67-69=136	−4
T5	(Northern Ireland) Rory McIlroy	65-71=136	−4
T5	(United States) Davis Riley	68-68=136	−4
T8	(United States) Stewart Cink	69-68=137	−3
T8	(England) Matt Fitzpatrick	68-69=137	−3
T10	(United States) Sam Burns	71-67=138	−2
T10	(England) Tyrrell Hatton	70-68=138	−2
T10	(United States) Chris Kirk	68-70=138	−2
T10	(United States) Matt Kuchar	67-71=138	−2
T10	(Australia) Cameron Smith	68-70=138	−2
T10	(United States) Gary Woodland	70-68=138	−2
T10	(United States) Cameron Young	71-67=138	−2

=== Third round ===
Saturday, May 21, 2022

Mito Pereira, in his PGA Championship debut, shot a one-under 69 to take a three-shot lead into the final round. Beginning the round a shot behind Will Zalatoris, Pereira birdied two of his first five holes and opened up as much as a four-shot lead on the front-nine before three consecutive bogeys from holes 8 to 10.

He rebounded with a 17-foot birdie putt on the par-5 13th, then hit his approach on the par-3 14th to six feet for another birdie. He finished the round by making a 27-foot putt for birdie on the 18th green to finish at nine-under for the tournament. He became the first player to lead after 54 holes in his tournament debut since John Daly in 1991.

Zalatoris, the overnight leader, bogeyed four holes on his front-nine, including a three-putt on the par-3 sixth hole. He made his first birdie on the round on the 13th, holing a 35-foot putt. After a bogey on the 16th when he could not advance his ball out of the right rough off the tee, he hit his second on the par-4 17th inside four feet for a birdie to climb back to six-under for the tournament, three shots back of Pereira.

Matt Fitzpatrick and Cameron Young both shot 67 (−3) to climb into contention. Fitzpatrick birdied four of his last 10 holes, including both 17 and 18, to join Zalatoris at six-under and a tie for second place. Young drove the green on the 17th and made a 24-foot putt for eagle to finish at five-under and alone in fourth place.

2017 champion Justin Thomas began the round in third place but shot 74 (+4) to fall seven shots off the lead at two-under. Two-time champion Rory McIlroy also shot 74, including a triple-bogey at the 11th; he finished at even-par. Bubba Watson was alone in second place while playing the front-nine but went four-over on the back-nine to join a group tied for seventh place at two-under.

Tiger Woods shot a nine-over 79, including a stretch of five bogeys in a row for the first time in his major championship career, before withdrawing from the tournament after the round.

Place	Player	Score	To par
1	(Chile) Mito Pereira	68-64-69=201	−9
T2	(England) Matt Fitzpatrick	68-69-67=204	−6
T2	(United States) Will Zalatoris	66-65-73=204	−6
4	(United States) Cameron Young	71-67-67=205	−5
5	(Mexico) Abraham Ancer	67-69-70=206	−4
6	(Republic of Ireland) Séamus Power	71-69-67=207	−3
T7	(United States) Stewart Cink	69-68-71=208	−2
T7	(United States) Justin Thomas	67-67-74=208	−2
T7	(United States) Bubba Watson	72-63-73=208	−2
T10	(United States) Sam Burns	71-67-71=209	−1
T10	(Australia) Lucas Herbert	68-73-68=209	−1
T10	(United States) Max Homa	70-69-70=209	−1
T10	(United States) Chris Kirk	68-70-71=209	−1
T10	(United States) Davis Riley	68-68-73=209	−1
T10	(United States) Webb Simpson	69-75-65=209	−1
T10	(United States) Gary Woodland	70-68-71=209	−1

=== Final round ===
Sunday, May 22, 2022

==== Summary ====
Will Zalatoris, beginning the round three shots behind Mito Pereira, tied the lead with two birdies in his first five holes while Pereira was one-over. Zalatoris made bogey on the par-3 sixth hole after hitting his approach over the green into thick bushes and taking a drop on the cart path, then failed to get up-and-down from a greenside bunker on the seventh for another bogey as Pereira again went three ahead with a birdie at the fifth hole. Pereira bogeyed both the seventh and eighth holes but managed to save par from a bunker on the ninth to make the turn at seven-under, one shot ahead of Zalatoris and Cameron Young.

Zalatoris bogeyed the 12th, while Young tied Pereira at six-under when the leader also bogeyed the hole. Pereira reached the green on the par-5 13th hole in two shots and two-putted for birdie, while Young fell two behind after hitting his tee shot on the par-3 14th into a bunker. Young three-putted for a double-bogey on the 16th and finished the round at four-under following a 71. Pereira's tee shot on the 14th flew over the green and he made another bogey, dropping his lead again to just one shot. Zalatoris also three-putted for bogey on the 16th before holing a seven-foot birdie putt at the 17th to reach five-under.

While the leaders were struggling, Justin Thomas, who began the round seven shots behind, was quickly moving up the leaderboard. He birdied the ninth hole, then made a 64-foot putt from the front of the 11th green for another birdie. He made his second consecutive birdie on the 12th hole to reach four-under, then got up-and-down from a bunker on the short 17th for another birdie that moved him to five-under. At the 18th, he hit his approach to 10 feet but missed the birdie putt, settling for a par and a three-under round of 67.

Zalatoris made an eight-foot par putt on the 18th to tie Thomas for the clubhouse lead at five-under. Leading by one playing the 18th, Pereira hit his drive to the right into a water hazard, found the rough on his third shot, then chipped over the green. He suffered a double-bogey on the hole, dropping down to four-under and a shot out of the playoff.

==== Final leaderboard ====
Champion
(c) = past champion

Top 10
Place	Player	Score	To par	Money (US$)
T1	(United States) Justin Thomas (c)	67-67-74-67=275	−5	Playoff
T1	(United States) Will Zalatoris	66-65-73-71=275	−5	Playoff
T3	(Chile) Mito Pereira	68-64-69-75=276	−4	1,020,000
T3	(United States) Cameron Young	71-67-67-71=276	−4	1,020,000
T5	(England) Matt Fitzpatrick	68-69-67-73=277	−3	720,000
T5	(England) Tommy Fleetwood	71-70-69-67=277	−3	720,000
T5	(United States) Chris Kirk	68-70-71-68=277	−3	720,000
8	(Northern Ireland) Rory McIlroy (c)	65-71-74-68=278	−2	436,600
T9	(Mexico) Abraham Ancer	67-69-70-73=279	−1	400,000
T9	(United States) Tom Hoge	66-74-70-69=279	−1	400,000
T9	(Republic of Ireland) Séamus Power	71-69-67-72=279	−1	400,000
T9	(United States) Brendan Steele	70-72-69-68=279	−1	400,000

Leaderboard below the top 10
Place	Player	Score	To par	Money ($)
T13	(England) Tyrrell Hatton	70-68-74-68=280	E	291,250
T13	(Australia) Lucas Herbert	68-73-68-71=280	E	291,250
T13	(United States) Max Homa	70-69-70-71=280	E	291,250
T13	(United States) Davis Riley	68-68-73-71=280	E	291,250
T13	(England) Justin Rose	71-70-71-68=280	E	291,250
T13	(United States) Xander Schauffele	68-73-69-70=280	E	291,250
T13	(Australia) Cameron Smith	68-70-73-69=280	E	291,250
T20	(United States) Sam Burns	71-67-71-72=281	+1	203,750
T20	(United States) Talor Gooch	69-70-74-68=281	+1	203,750
T20	(United States) Webb Simpson	69-75-65-72=281	+1	203,750
T23	(United States) Stewart Cink	69-68-71-74=282	+2	166,250
T23	(United States) Rickie Fowler	71-70-71-70=282	+2	166,250
T23	(United States) Lucas Glover	75-69-68-70=282	+2	166,250
T23	(Republic of Ireland) Shane Lowry	70-72-71-69=282	+2	166,250
T23	(United States) Kevin Na	68-71-72-71=282	+2	166,250
T23	(Chile) Joaquín Niemann	68-71-72-71=282	+2	166,250
T23	(United States) Aaron Wise	69-72-71-70=282	+2	166,250
T30	(Spain) Adri Arnaus	72-68-70-73=283	+3	91,250
T30	(United States) Tony Finau	69-72-74-68=283	+3	91,250
T30	(United States) Bubba Watson	72-63-73-75=283	+3	91,250
T30	(Austria) Bernd Wiesberger	72-67-74-70=283	+3	91,250
T34	(United States) Brian Harman	74-70-71-69=284	+4	71,250
T34	(United States) Matt Kuchar	67-71-73-73=284	+4	71,250
T34	(Australia) Marc Leishman	72-71-73-68=284	+4	71,250
T34	(United States) Keith Mitchell	72-72-72-68=284	+4	71,250
T34	(United States) Patrick Reed	69-70-73-72=284	+4	71,250
T34	(United States) Jordan Spieth	72-69-74-69=284	+4	71,250
T34	(United States) Gary Woodland	70-68-71-75=284	+4	71,250
T41	(Norway) Viktor Hovland	70-70-75-70=285	+5	51,250
T41	(United States) Luke List	74-70-71-70=285	+5	51,250
T41	(South Korea) Lee Kyoung-hoon	69-73-71-72=285	+5	51,250
T41	(United States) Troy Merritt	73-70-72-70=285	+5	51,250
T41	(United States) Adam Schenk	71-72-72-70=285	+5	51,250
T41	(United States) Kevin Streelman	71-72-75-67=285	+5	51,250
T41	(United States) Cameron Tringale	72-68-72-73=285	+5	51,250
T48	(United States) Keegan Bradley (c)	72-70-73-71=286	+6	35,000
T48	(England) Laurie Canter	72-70-70-74=286	+6	35,000
T48	(Australia) Cameron Davis	72-72-72-70=286	+6	35,000
T48	(United States) Denny McCarthy	73-68-74-71=286	+6	35,000
T48	(Spain) Jon Rahm	73-69-76-68=286	+6	35,000
T48	(United States) Harold Varner III	71-71-72-72=286	+6	35,000
54	(New Zealand) Ryan Fox	70-70-70-77=287	+7	29,250
T55	(Australia) Jason Day (c)	71-72-72-73=288	+8	28,750
T55	(United States) Brooks Koepka (c)	75-67-72-74=288	+8	28,750
T55	(Italy) Francesco Molinari	70-72-75-71=288	+8	28,750
T55	(United States) Collin Morikawa (c)	72-72-74-70=288	+8	28,750
T55	(Colombia) Sebastián Muñoz	74-70-69-75=288	+8	28,750
T60	(United States) Lanto Griffin	72-69-75-73=289	+9	27,000
T60	(United States) Russell Henley	70-73-70-76=289	+9	27,000
T60	(Japan) Rikuya Hoshino	74-70-69-76=289	+9	27,000
T60	(South Korea) Kim Si-woo	71-72-76-70=289	+9	27,000
T60	(United States) Jason Kokrak	74-68-77-70=289	+9	27,000
T60	(Japan) Hideki Matsuyama	72-72-72-73=289	+9	27,000
T60	(South Africa) Louis Oosthuizen	73-71-73-72=289	+9	27,000
T60	(South Africa) Charl Schwartzel	71-73-73-72=289	+9	27,000
68	(United States) Billy Horschel	75-69-77-69=290	+10	25,000
T69	(United States) Kramer Hickok	71-71-75-74=291	+11	24,750
T69	(United States) Beau Hossler	69-71-78-73=291	+11	24,750
T71	(Canada) Adam Hadwin	73-71-75-73=292	+12	24,400
T71	(South Africa) Justin Harding	71-72-75-74=292	+12	24,400
T71	(South Africa) Shaun Norris	71-72-74-75=292	+12	24,400
T71	(Belgium) Thomas Pieters	69-73-77-73=292	+12	24,400
T75	(United States) Patton Kizzire	69-75-78-73=295	+15	24,000
T75	(United States) Maverick McNealy	73-71-78-73=295	+15	24,000
77	(Scotland) Robert MacIntyre	70-71-80-76=297	+17	23,800
78	(Austria) Sepp Straka	71-72-79-76=298	+18	23,700
WD	(United States) Tiger Woods (c)	74-69-79=222	+12	
CUT	(South Africa) Branden Grace	73-72=145	+5	
CUT	(United States) Harry Higgs	74-71=145	+5	
CUT	(United States) Chan Kim	71-73=145	+5	
CUT	(United States) Kevin Kisner	72-73=145	+5	
CUT	(Australia) Min Woo Lee	73-72=145	+5	
CUT	(United States) Ryan Palmer	73-72=145	+5	
CUT	(England) Ian Poulter	76-69=145	+5	
CUT	(United States) J. J. Spaun	72-73=145	+5	
CUT	(Sweden) Henrik Stenson	72-73=145	+5	
CUT	(South Africa) Christiaan Bezuidenhout	73-73=146	+6	
CUT	(United States) Dustin Johnson	73-73=146	+6	
CUT	(Scotland) Russell Knox	74-72=146	+6	
CUT	(Japan) Jinichiro Kozuma	73-73=146	+6	
CUT	(India) Anirban Lahiri	73-73=146	+6	
CUT	(Sweden) Alex Norén	70-76=146	+6	
CUT	(United States) Scottie Scheffler	71-75=146	+6	
CUT	(England) Lee Westwood	75-71=146	+6	
CUT	(South Korea) Yang Yong-eun (c)	71-75=146	+6	
CUT	(United States) Rich Beem (c)	73-74=147	+7	
CUT	(United States) Matt Borchert	73-74=147	+7	
CUT	(South Africa) Dean Burmester	69-78=147	+7	
CUT	(United States) Jason Dufner (c)	72-75=147	+7	
CUT	(Spain) Sergio García	73-74=147	+7	
CUT	(Thailand) Sadom Kaewkanjana	75-72=147	+7	
CUT	(Australia) Adam Scott	77-70=147	+7	
CUT	(United States) John Daly (c)	72-76=148	+8	
CUT	(Japan) Yuki Inamori	72-76=148	+8	
CUT	(South Korea) Kim Bi-o	76-72=148	+8	
CUT	(United States) Scott Stallings	78-70=148	+8	
CUT	(United States) Hudson Swafford	74-74=148	+8	
CUT	(United States) Ryan Brehm	76-73=149	+9	
CUT	(Canada) Corey Conners	76-73=149	+9	
CUT	(United States) Joel Dahmen	73-76=149	+9	
CUT	(England) Sam Horsfield	74-75=149	+9	
CUT	(Canada) Mackenzie Hughes	77-72=149	+9	
CUT	(South Africa) Daniel van Tonder	74-75=149	+9	
CUT	(South Africa) Oliver Bekker	78-72=150	+10	
CUT	(England) Richard Bland	74-76=150	+10	
CUT	(United States) Cameron Champ	74-76=150	+10	
CUT	(United States) Tyler Collet	79-71=150	+10	
CUT	(South Africa) Garrick Higgo	74-76=150	+10	
CUT	(Australia) Matt Jones	73-77=150	+10	
CUT	(United States) Jesse Mueller	72-78=150	+10	
CUT	(United States) Alex Beach	73-78=151	+11	
CUT	(United States) Michael Block	78-73=151	+11	
CUT	(United States) Patrick Cantlay	76-75=151	+11	
CUT	(Germany) Alex Čejka	72-79=151	+11	
CUT	(United States) Zach Johnson	74-77=151	+11	
CUT	(Japan) Ryosuke Kinoshita	79-72=151	+11	
CUT	(United States) Chad Ramey	77-74=151	+11	
CUT	(South Africa) Erik van Rooyen	75-76=151	+11	
CUT	(United States) Ryan Vermeer	75-76=151	+11	
CUT	(Republic of Ireland) Pádraig Harrington (c)	77-75=152	+12	
CUT	(United States) Kyle Mendoza	75-77=152	+12	
CUT	(Venezuela) Jhonattan Vegas	73-79=152	+12	
CUT	(United States) Daniel Berger	73-80=153	+13	
CUT	(United States) Brandon Bingaman	78-75=153	+13	
CUT	(Denmark) Nicolai Højgaard	78-75=153	+13	
CUT	(United States) Nic Ishee	78-75=153	+13	
CUT	(Japan) Takumi Kanaya	77-76=153	+13	
CUT	(Germany) Martin Kaymer (c)	76-77=153	+13	
CUT	(United States) Shaun Micheel (c)	76-77=153	+13	
CUT	(United States) Dylan Newman	78-75=153	+13	
CUT	(United States) Matthew Wolff	76-77=153	+13	
CUT	(South Korea) Tom Kim	78-76=154	+14	
CUT	(Spain) Pablo Larrazábal	77-77=154	+14	
CUT	(Mexico) Carlos Ortiz	79-75=154	+14	
CUT	(United States) Wyatt Worthington II	77-77=154	+14	
CUT	(United States) Paul Dickinson	78-77=155	+15	
CUT	(United States) Colin Inglis	78-77=155	+15	
CUT	(United States) Jared Jones	79-78=157	+17	
CUT	(United States) Casey Pyne	79-78=157	+17	
CUT	(United States) Shawn Warren	78-79=157	+17	
CUT	(United States) Tim Feenstra	77-81=158	+18	
CUT	(United States) Austin Hurt	78-81=159	+19	
CUT	(United States) Sean McCarty	82-79=161	+21	
CUT	(United States) Zac Oakley	81-82=163	+23	

==== Scorecard ====
Hole	1	2	3	4	5	6	7	8	9	10	11	12	13	14	15	16	17	18
Par	4	4	4	4	5	3	4	3	4	4	3	4	5	3	4	4	4	4
(United States) Thomas	−2	−2	−1	−1	−2	−1	−1	−1	−2	−2	−3	−4	−4	−4	−4	−4	−5	−5
(United States) Zalatoris	−6	−6	−6	−7	−8	−7	−6	−6	−6	−6	−6	−5	−5	−5	−5	−4	−5	−5
(Chile) Pereira	−9	−9	−8	−8	−9	−9	−8	−7	−7	−7	−7	−6	−7	−6	−6	−6	−6	−4
(United States) Young	−4	−5	−5	−5	−6	−6	−6	−5	−6	−6	−6	−6	−6	−5	−5	−3	−4	−4
(England) Fitzpatrick	−5	−5	−5	−6	−6	−5	−5	−5	−5	−4	−3	−3	−3	−3	−4	−4	−3	−3
(England) Fleetwood	E	E	E	−1	−2	−2	−1	E	+1	+2	+2	+1	+1	E	−1	−2	−3	−3
(United States) Kirk	−1	E	E	E	−1	−1	E	E	E	E	E	E	−1	−1	−1	−1	−3	−3
(Northern Ireland) McIlroy	E	−1	−2	−3	−4	−3	−3	−3	−3	−3	−3	−3	−3	−3	−3	−3	−2	−2

Cumulative tournament scores, relative to par

Eagle	Birdie	Bogey	Double Bogey

=== Playoff ===
Thomas and Zalatoris advanced to the three-hole aggregate playoff. After both Thomas and Zalatoris birdied the par-5 13th hole to begin the playoff, Thomas drove the green on the 17th and two-putted for birdie while Zalatoris settled for par. When Zalatoris missed a lengthy birdie putt on the 18th, Thomas needed only to two-putt for par to win his second major title, both at the PGA Championship. Thomas' seven-shot comeback after 54 holes tied John Mahaffey in 1978 for the largest in PGA Championship history.

Place	Player	Score	To par	Money ($)
1	(United States) Justin Thomas	4-3-4=11	−2	2,700,000
2	(United States) Will Zalatoris	4-4-x=x	x	1,620,000

==== Scorecard ====
Hole	13	17	18
Par	5	4	4
(United States) Thomas	−1	−2	−2
(United States) Zalatoris	−1	−1	x
