= South Hills =

South Hills may refer to:

- South Hills, Gauteng, city in South Africa
- South Hills (California), small mountain range in eastern Los Angeles County, California, United States
- South Hills (Montana), foothills near Missoula
- South Hills (Pennsylvania), collective name for the southern suburbs of Pittsburgh, Pennsylvania, United States
  - South Hills Village, shopping mall
- South Hills, Kentucky, annexed by Fort Wright, Kentucky
- South Hills, a neighborhood of Charleston, West Virginia

== See also ==
- South Hills High School (disambiguation)
- The Shoppes at South Hills, in Poughkeepsie, New York, United States
- Southern Hills (disambiguation)
