= 2001 U.S. Open =

2001 U.S. Open may refer to:

- 2001 U.S. Open (golf), a major golf tournament
- 2001 US Open (tennis), a Grand Slam tennis tournament
- 2001 Lamar Hunt U.S. Open Cup, a soccer tournament for U.S. teams
