= 1970 PGA Championship =

Coordinates: 36.070°N 95.946°W

Tournament information
- Dates: August 13–16, 1970
- Location: Tulsa, Oklahoma
- Course: Southern Hills Country Club
- Organized by: PGA of America
- Tour: PGA Tour

Statistics
- Par: 70
- Length: 6,962 yards (6,366 m)
- Field: 136 players, 70 after cut
- Cut: 150 (+10)
- Prize fund: $200,000
- Winner's share: $40,000

Champion
- (United States) Dave Stockton
- 279 (−1)

Location in the United States
Location in Oklahoma

The 1970 PGA Championship was the 52nd PGA Championship, played August 13–16 at Southern Hills Country Club in Tulsa, Oklahoma. Dave Stockton won the first of his two PGA Championships at 279 (−1), two strokes ahead of runners-up Bob Murphy and Arnold Palmer.

It was Palmer's third runner-up finish at the only major he never won, and was his last time in contention in the final round of a PGA Championship. Stockton won his second PGA Championship six years later in 1976.

The third round was played in 101 °F (38 °C) heat, and Stockton led by three strokes after 54 holes at 206 (−4). Defending champion Raymond Floyd carded a 65 (−5) on Saturday and was in second place at 209 (−1) entering the final round, and Palmer was alone in third place at 211 (+1).

It was the second major championship at Southern Hills, which hosted the U.S. Open in 1958. It later hosted the U.S. Open in 1977 and 2001 and the PGA Championship in 1982, 1994, 2007, and 2022.

== Course layout ==
Hole	1	2	3	4	5	6	7	8	9	Out	10	11	12	13	14	15	16	17	18	In	Total
Yards	459	450	410	360	630	188	385	218	378	3,478	401	167	456	470	215	410	552	355	458	3,484	6,962
Par	4	4	4	4	5	3	4	3	4	35	4	3	4	4	3	4	5	4	4	35	70

== Round summaries ==
=== First round ===
Thursday, August 13, 1970

Place	Player	Score	To par
T1	(United States) Johnny Miller	68	−2
T1	(United States) Jack Nicklaus	68	−2
T3	(United States) Charles Coody	69	−1
T3	(United States) Larry Hinson	69	−1
T5	(United States) Homero Blancas	70	E
T5	(United States) Jacky Cupit	70	E
T5	(United States) Dick Hendrickson	70	E
T5	(United States) Arnold Palmer	70	E
T5	(United States) Mason Rudolph	70	E
T5	(United States) Sam Snead	70	E
T5	(United States) Dave Stockton	70	E

=== Second round ===
Friday, August 14, 1970

Place	Player	Score	To par
T1	(United States) Larry Hinson	69-71=140	E
T1	(United States) Dave Stockton	70-70=140	E
T3	(United States) Mike Hill	71-70=141	+1
T3	(United States) Hale Irwin	71-70=141	+1
T3	(United States) Mason Rudolph	71-70=141	+1
T6	(United States) Billy Casper	72-70=142	+2
T6	(United States) Dick Lotz	72-70=142	+2
T6	(United States) Arnold Palmer	70-72=142	+2
T6	(South Africa) Gary Player	74-69=142	+2
T10	(United States) Julius Boros	72-71=143	+3
T10	(United States) Bill Collins	72-71=143	+3
T10	(United States) Terry Dill	72-71=143	+3
T10	(United States) Lou Graham	75-68=143	+3
T10	(United States) Howie Johnson	71-72=143	+3
T10	(United States) Gene Littler	72-71=143	+3
T10	(United States) Bob Lunn	74-69=143	+3
T10	(United States) Billy Maxwell	72-71=143	+3
T10	(United States) Bert Yancey	74-69=143	+3

=== Third round ===
Saturday, August 15, 1970

Place	Player	Score	To par
1	(United States) Dave Stockton	70-70-66=206	−4
2	(United States) Raymond Floyd	71-73-65=209	−1
3	(United States) Arnold Palmer	70-72-69=211	+1
4	(United States) Gene Littler	72-71-69=212	+2
T5	(United States) Bob Lunn	74-69-70=213	+3
T5	(United States) Sam Snead	70-75-68=213	+3
T7	(United States) Larry Hinson	69-71-74=214	+4
T7	(United States) Mason Rudolph	71-70-73=214	+4
T9	(United States) Julius Boros	72-71-72=215	+5
T9	(United States) Mike Hill	71-70-74=215	+5
T9	(United States) Johnny Miller	68-77-70=215	+5
T9	(United States) Bob Murphy	71-73-71=215	+5

=== Final round ===
Sunday, August 16, 1970

Place	Player	Score	To par	Money ($)
1	(United States) Dave Stockton	70-70-66-73=279	−1	40,000
T2	(United States) Bob Murphy	71-73-71-66=281	+1	18,500
T2	(United States) Arnold Palmer	70-72-69-70=281	+1	18,500
T4	(United States) Larry Hinson	69-71-74-68=282	+2	8,800
T4	(United States) Gene Littler	72-71-69-70=282	+2	8,800
T6	(Australia) Bruce Crampton	73-75-68-67=283	+3	6,800
T6	(United States) Jack Nicklaus	68-76-73-66=283	+3	6,800
T8	(United States) Raymond Floyd	71-73-65-75=284	+4	5,650
T8	(United States) Dick Lotz	72-70-75-67=284	+4	5,650
T10	(United States) Billy Maxwell	72-71-73-69=285	+5	4,800
T10	(United States) Mason Rudolph	71-70-73-71=285	+5	4,800
