= 1958 U.S. Open (golf) =

Coordinates: 36.070°N 95.946°W

Tournament information
- Dates: June 12–14, 1958
- Location: Tulsa, Oklahoma
- Course: Southern Hills Country Club
- Organized by: USGA
- Tour: PGA Tour

Statistics
- Par: 70
- Length: 6,907 yards (6,316 m)
- Field: 159 players, 55 after cut
- Cut: 154 (+14)
- Prize fund: $35,000
- Winner's share: $8,000

Champion
- (United States) Tommy Bolt
- 283 (+3)

Location in the United States
Location in Oklahoma

The 1958 U.S. Open was the 58th U.S. Open, held June 12–14 at Southern Hills Country Club in Tulsa, Oklahoma. Amid oppressive heat and high winds that created difficult scoring conditions, native Oklahoman Tommy Bolt won his only major championship, four strokes ahead of Gary Player. It was Player's debut in the U.S. Open at age 22.

Bolt owned the 36-hole lead at 142 (+2), a stroke ahead of Player. After a third round 69 on Saturday morning, Bolt was at 211 (+1) and three strokes ahead of Gene Littler, who carded a 67 for 214 (+4). Littler fell back in the final round in the afternoon, shooting a 76 to finish in fourth place. Bolt ran away from the field with a final round 72 for 283 (+3), four ahead of Player. Bolt was the only player not to record a round of 75 or over during the championship.

Ben Hogan, in search of his fifth U.S. Open title, was hampered by an injured left wrist and finished eleven strokes back in a tie for tenth. Eighteen-year-old Jack Nicklaus, in his second U.S. Open, made his first cut and finished in 41st place. Sam Snead missed the cut for the first time in 18 Open appearances. Two-time champion Gene Sarazen missed the cut in his final appearance, while three-time Masters champion Jimmy Demaret also played his final Open, withdrawing after the third round.

It was the first of eight major championships at Southern Hills. The U.S. Open returned in 1977 and 2001 and the PGA Championship has been played at the course five times: 1970, 1982, 1994, 2007 and 2022.

== Course layout ==
Hole	1	2	3	4	5	6	7	8	9	Out	10	11	12	13	14	15	16	17	18	In	Total
Yards	459	450	410	371	592	177	401	218	378	3,456	378	167	465	469	210	410	538	346	468	3,451	6,907
Par	4	4	4	4	5	3	4	3	4	35	4	3	4	4	3	4	5	4	4	35	70

== Round summaries ==
=== First round ===
Thursday, June 12, 1958

Place	Player	Score	To par
T1	(United States) Tommy Bolt	71	+1
T1	(United States) Julius Boros	71	+1
T1	(United States) Dick Metz	71	+1
T4	(United States) Lloyd Mangrum	72	+2
T4	(United States) Frank Stranahan	72	+2
T6	(Australia) Bruce Crampton	73	+3
T6	(United States) Jimmy Demaret	73	+3
T8	(United States) Labron Harris	74	+4
T8	(United States) Gene Littler	74	+4
T8	(United States) Smiley Quick	74	+4
T8	(United States) Harvie Ward (a)	74	+4

(a) denotes amateur

=== Second round ===
Friday, June 13, 1958

Place	Player	Score	To par
1	(United States) Tommy Bolt	71-71=142	+2
2	(South Africa) Gary Player	75-68=143	+3
3	(United States) Frank Stranahan	72-72=144	+4
T4	(United States) Julius Boros	71-75=146	+6
T4	(United States) Charles Coe (a)	75-71=146	+6
T4	(United States) Labron Harris	74-72=146	+6
T7	(United States) Jimmy Demaret	73-74=147	+7
T7	(United States) Gene Littler	74-73=147	+7
T9	(Australia) Bruce Crampton	73-75=148	+8
T9	(United States) Ben Hogan	75-73=148	+8
T9	(United States) Tom Nieporte	75-73=148	+8

(a) denotes amateur

=== Third round ===
Saturday, June 14, 1958 (morning)

Place	Player	Score	To par
1	(United States) Tommy Bolt	71-71-69=211	+1
2	(United States) Gene Littler	74-73-67=214	+4
3	(South Africa) Gary Player	75-68-73=216	+6
4	(United States) Julius Boros	71-75-72=218	+8
T5	(United States) Walter Burkemo	75-74-70=219	+9
T5	(United States) Frank Stranahan	72-72-75=219	+9
7	(United States) Don January	79-73-68=220	+10
T8	(United States) Charles Coe (a)	75-71-75=211	+11
T8	(United States) Dick Mayer	76-74-71=221	+11
T8	(United States) Bob Rosburg	75-74-72=221	+11

(a) denotes amateur

=== Final round ===
Saturday, June 14, 1958 (afternoon)

Place	Player	Score	To par	Money ($)
1	(United States) Tommy Bolt	71-71-69-72=283	+3	8,000
2	(South Africa) Gary Player	75-68-73-71=287	+7	5,000
3	(United States) Julius Boros	71-75-72-71=289	+9	3,000
4	(United States) Gene Littler	74-73-67-76=290	+10	2,000
T5	(United States) Walter Burkemo	75-74-70-72=291	+11	1,625
T5	(United States) Bob Rosburg	75-74-72-70=291	+11	1,625
T7	(United States) Jay Hebert	77-76-71-69=293	+13	1,016
T7	(United States) Don January	79-73-68-73=293	+13	1,016
T7	(United States) Dick Metz	71-78-73-71=293	+13	1,016
T10	(United States) Ben Hogan	75-73-75-71=294	+14	566
T10	(United States) Tommy Jacobs	76-75-71-72=294	+14	566
T10	(United States) Frank Stranahan	72-72-75-75=294	+14	566
