= 1994 PGA Championship =

Coordinates: 36.070°N 95.946°W

Tournament information
- Dates: August 11–14, 1994
- Location: Tulsa, Oklahoma
- Course(s): Southern Hills Country Club
- Organized by: PGA of America
- Tour(s): PGA Tour

Statistics
- Par: 70
- Length: 6,834 yards (6,249 m)
- Field: 151 players, 76 after cut
- Cut: 145 (+5)
- Prize fund: $1,750,000
- Winner's share: $310,000

Champion
- (Zimbabwe) Nick Price
- 269 (−11)

Location in the United States

The 1994 PGA Championship was the 76th PGA Championship, held August 11–14 at Southern Hills Country Club in Tulsa, Oklahoma. Nick Price led wire-to-wire (he shared the first round lead and then led on his own after every other round) and won his third and final major title, six strokes ahead of runner-up Corey Pavin. It was Price's second consecutive major and second PGA Championship in three years. Following this win, he moved to the top of the Official World Golf Ranking.

Price became the first to win the Open Championship and PGA Championship in the same year in seven decades, last by Walter Hagen in 1924. Greg Norman had just missed the previous year, losing in a playoff; it was later accomplished by Tiger Woods in 2000 and 2006, Pádraig Harrington in 2008, and Rory McIlroy in 2014.

Price's 269 was a record for the event, passing the 271 of Bobby Nichols set thirty years earlier in 1964. It lasted just a year, lowered to 267 in 1995 at Riviera by Steve Elkington and Colin Montgomerie. (It was further lowered in 2001 by David Toms' 265.)

Price's 6-stroke win was the largest margin of victory at a major championship between Jack Nicklaus' 7-stroke victory at the 1980 PGA Championship and Tiger Woods' 12-stroke victory at the 1997 Masters Tournament. Price later described it as the best he'd ever played.

This was the fifth major held at Southern Hills; it previously hosted the PGA Championship in 1970 and 1982 and the U.S. Open in 1958 and 1977. It later hosted the U.S. Open in 2001 and the PGA Championship in 2007 and 2022.

== Course layout ==
Hole	1	2	3	4	5	6	7	8	9	Out	10	11	12	13	14	15	16	17	18	In	Total
Yards	456	458	405	368	605	175	382	215	374	3,447	376	164	448	537	207	405	468	352	430	3,387	6,834
Par	4	4	4	4	5	3	4	3	4	35	4	3	4	5	3	4	4	4	4	35	70

== Round summaries ==
=== First round ===
Thursday, August 11, 1994

Place	Player	Score	To par
T1	(Scotland) Colin Montgomerie	67	−3
T1	(Zimbabwe) Nick Price	67	−3
T3	(United States) Fred Couples	68	−2
T3	(South Africa) Ernie Els	68	−2
T3	(United States) Phil Mickelson	68	−2
T3	(Wales) Ian Woosnam	68	−2
T7	(United States) Raymond Floyd	69	−1
T7	(England) David Gilford	69	−1
T7	(United States) Loren Roberts	69	−1
T7	(Scotland) Sam Torrance	69	−1
T7	(United States) Lanny Wadkins	69	−1
T7	(United States) Tom Watson	69	−1
T7	(United States) D. A. Weibring	69	−1
T7	(United States) Fuzzy Zoeller	69	−1

=== Second round ===
Friday, August 12, 1994

Place	Player	Score	To par
1	(Zimbabwe) Nick Price	67-65=132	−8
T2	(United States) Ben Crenshaw	70-67=137	−3
T2	(United States) Jay Haas	71-66=137	−3
T2	(United States) Corey Pavin	70-67=137	−3
T5	(United States) John Cook	71-67=138	−2
T5	(United States) Blaine McCallister	74-64=138	−2
T5	(Spain) José María Olazábal	72-66=138	−2
T8	(United States) Glen Day	70-69=139	−1
T8	(South Africa) Ernie Els	68-71=139	−1
T8	(United States) Phil Mickelson	68-71=139	−1
T8	(United States) Gil Morgan	71-68=139	−1
T8	(New Zealand) Frank Nobilo	72-67=139	−1
T8	(Australia) Craig Parry	70-69=139	−1

=== Third round ===
Saturday, August 13, 1994

Place	Player	Score	To par
1	(Zimbabwe) Nick Price	67-65-70=202	−8
2	(United States) Jay Haas	71-66-68=205	−5
T3	(United States) Corey Pavin	70-67-69=206	−4
T3	(United States) Phil Mickelson	68-71-67=206	−4
T5	(United States) John Cook	71-67-69=207	−3
T5	(United States) Ben Crenshaw	70-67-70=207	−3
T5	(Australia) Greg Norman	71-69-67=207	−3
T8	(South Africa) Ernie Els	68-71-69=208	−2
T8	(Spain) José María Olazábal	72-66-70=208	−2
T8	(United States) Loren Roberts	69-72-67=208	−2
T8	(United States) Jeff Sluman	70-72-66=208	−2
T8	(United States) Tom Watson	69-72-67=208	−2

=== Final round ===
Sunday, August 14, 1994

Place	Player	Score	To par	Money ($)
1	(Zimbabwe) Nick Price	67-65-70-67=269	−11	310,000
2	(United States) Corey Pavin	70-67-69-69=275	−5	160,000
3	(United States) Phil Mickelson	68-71-67-70=276	−4	110,000
T4	(United States) John Cook	71-67-69-70=277	−3	76,667
T4	(England) Nick Faldo	73-67-71-66=277	−3	76,667
T4	(Australia) Greg Norman	71-69-67-70=277	−3	76,667
T7	(Australia) Steve Elkington	73-70-66-69=278	−2	57,500
T7	(Spain) José María Olazábal	72-66-70-70=278	−2	57,500
T9	(United States) Ben Crenshaw	70-67-70-72=279	−1	41,000
T9	(United States) Tom Kite	72-68-69-70=279	−1	41,000
T9	(United States) Loren Roberts	69-72-67-71=279	−1	41,000
T9	(United States) Tom Watson	69-72-67-71=279	−1	41,000
T9	(Wales) Ian Woosnam	68-72-73-66=279	−1	41,000
