= Southern Hills Formation =

- Stratigraphic range: 575 – 538.8 Ma (Ediacaran)
- Type: Formation
- Unit of: Long Harbour Group

Location
- Region: Newfoundland
- Country: Canada
- Occurrence of the Southern Hills Formation in southeastern Newfoundland

The Southern Hills Formation is a formation cropping out in Newfoundland, Canada.
