= 1982 PGA Championship =

Tournament information
- Dates: August 5–8, 1982
- Location: Tulsa, Oklahoma; 36.070°N 95.946°W
- Course: Southern Hills Country Club
- Organized by: PGA of America
- Tour: PGA Tour

Statistics
- Par: 70
- Length: 6,862 yards (6,275 m)
- Field: 150 players, 74 after cut
- Cut: 145 (+5)
- Prize fund: $450,000
- Winner's share: $65,000

Champion
- (United States) Raymond Floyd
- 272 (−8)

Location map
- Location in the United States Location in Oklahoma

The 1982 PGA Championship was the 64th PGA Championship, held August 5–8 at Southern Hills Country Club in Tulsa, Oklahoma. Raymond Floyd won his second PGA Championship, three strokes ahead of runner-up Lanny Wadkins, the 1977 champion. A few weeks shy of age 40, Floyd shot an opening round 63 (−7) and led wire-to-wire to secure the third of his four major titles. He won his first PGA Championship thirteen years earlier, in 1969.

== Tournament summary ==
Temperatures exceeded 100 °F (38 °C) during the first two rounds and after a third round 68 (−2), Floyd was at 200 (−10), five shots ahead of Greg Norman and Jay Haas. At the end of a lackluster final round, Floyd had an opportunity to break the PGA's 72-hole record of 271, set 18 years earlier by Bobby Nichols in 1964, but double-bogeyed the final hole. The record lasted a dozen more years, until broken by Nick Price in 1994, also at Southern Hills.

The winner's share of $65,000 was the last in five figures at the PGA Championship. It rose over 50% to $100,000 the following year and to $125,000 in 1984, nearly doubling in just two years.

This was the fourth major for Southern Hills, which previously hosted the PGA Championship in 1970 and the U.S. Open in 1958 and 1977. The PGA Championship returned in 1994 and 2007 and the U.S. Open in 2001.

Floyd's win marked the tenth time that all four major championships were won by Americans in a calendar year. This was the last time this happened until 2024.

== Course layout ==
Hole	1	2	3	4	5	6	7	8	9	Out	10	11	12	13	14	15	16	17	18	In	Total
Yards	447	459	406	366	614	175	383	215	373	3,438	375	169	444	465	207	407	569	354	434	3,424	6,862
Par	4	4	4	4	5	3	4	3	4	35	4	3	4	4	3	4	5	4	4	35	70

== Round summaries ==
=== First round ===
Thursday, August 5, 1982

Place	Player	Score	To par
1	(United States) Raymond Floyd	63	−7
T2	(United States) Bob Gilder	66	−4
T2	(Australia) Greg Norman	66	−4
T4	(United States) Rex Caldwell	67	−3
T4	(United States) Fred Couples	67	−3
T4	(England) Nick Faldo	67	−3
T7	(United States) Rex Caldwell	68	−2
T7	(Australia) David Graham	68	−2
T7	(United States) Vance Heafner	68	−2
T7	(United States) John Jackson	68	−2
T7	(United States) Mark Pfeil	68	−2
T7	(United States) Jim Simons	68	−2

=== Second round ===
Friday, August 6, 1982

Place	Player	Score	To par
1	(United States) Raymond Floyd	63-69=132	−8
2	(United States) Bob Gilder	66-68=134	−6
T3	(Australia) Greg Norman	66-69=135	−5
T3	(United States) Jim Simons	68-67=135	−5
T5	(England) Nick Faldo	67-70=137	−3
T5	(United States) Jay Haas	71-66=137	−3
T7	(United States) Fred Couples	67-71=138	−2
T7	(United States) Lon Hinkle	70-68=138	−2
T9	(Spain) Seve Ballesteros	71-68=139	−1
T9	(Australia) David Graham	68-71=139	−1
T9	(United States) Vance Heafner	68-71=139	−1
T9	(United States) Calvin Peete	69-70=139	−1
T9	(United States) Lanny Wadkins	71-68=139	−1

=== Third round ===
Saturday, August 7, 1982

Place	Player	Score	To par
1	(United States) Raymond Floyd	63-69-68=200	−10
T2	(United States) Jay Haas	71-66-68=205	−5
T2	(Australia) Greg Norman	66-69-70=205	−5
4	(United States) Bob Gilder	66-68-72=206	−4
5	(United States) Calvin Peete	69-70-68=207	−3
T6	(Spain) Seve Ballesteros	71-68-69=208	−2
T6	(United States) Jim Simons	68-67-73=208	−2
T6	(United States) Lanny Wadkins	71-68-69=208	−2
9	(United States) Lon Hinkle	70-68-71=209	−1
T10	(United States) Fred Couples	67-71-72=210	E
T10	(United States) Danny Edwards	71-71-68=210	E
T10	(England) Nick Faldo	67-70-73=210	E
T10	(United States) Gil Morgan	76-66-68=210	E
T10	(United States) Hal Sutton	72-68-70=210	E

=== Final round ===
Sunday, August 8, 1982

Place	Player	Score	To par	Money ($)
1	(United States) Raymond Floyd	63-69-68-72=272	−8	65,000
2	(United States) Lanny Wadkins	71-68-69-67=275	−5	45,000
T3	(United States) Fred Couples	67-71-72-66=276	−4	27,500
T3	(United States) Calvin Peete	69-70-68-69=276	−4	27,500
T5	(United States) Jay Haas	71-66-68-72=277	−3	16,000
T5	(Australia) Greg Norman	66-69-70-72=277	−3	16,000
T5	(United States) Jim Simons	68-67-73-69=277	−3	16,000
8	(United States) Bob Gilder	66-68-72-72=278	−2	11,000
T9	(United States) Lon Hinkle	70-68-71-71=280	E	7,919
T9	(United States) Tom Kite	73-70-70-67=280	E	7,919
T9	(United States) Jerry Pate	72-69-70-69=280	E	7,919
T9	(United States) Tom Watson	72-69-71-68=280	E	7,919

==== Scorecard ====
Birdie	Bogey	Double bogey

Final round

Hole	1	2	3	4	5	6	7	8	9	10	11	12	13	14	15	16	17	18
Par	4	4	4	4	5	3	4	3	4	4	3	4	5	3	4	4	4	4
(United States) Floyd	−10	−10	−9	−9	−8	−8	−8	−9	−8	−7	−7	−8	−8	−8	−9	−10	−10	−8

Cumulative tournament scores, relative to par
