= Southern Hills Aquifer =

The Southern Hills aquifer system is the primary source of public water in the northern ten parishes of southeastern Louisiana. The aquifer dips towards the Gulf of Mexico and extends from the northern limit of the recharge region near Vicksburg, Mississippi, and as far south as the Baton Rouge area in south Louisiana. There are about thirteen aquifer units composing the system in the southern part of the area. The water is primarily a soft, sodium bicarbonate type with a dissolved-solids concentration of about 220 milligrams per liter in southern Louisiana.

Groundwater use in 1980 for public supply averaged 121 million gallons per day, serving over 700,000 people in southern Louisiana. In southwestern Mississippi, where the aquifer system is also a major source of water, utilization for these categories in 1980 totaled million gallons per day, serving about 270,000 people.
