= 2007 PGA Championship =

Coordinates: 36.070°N 95.946°W

Tournament information
- Dates: August 9–12, 2007
- Location: Tulsa, Oklahoma
- Course: Southern Hills Country Club
- Organized by: PGA of America
- Tours: PGA Tour; PGA European Tour; Japan Golf Tour

Statistics
- Par: 70
- Length: 7,131 yards (6,521 m)
- Field: 156 players, 72 after cut
- Cut: 145 (+5)
- Prize fund: $7,000,000 €5,007,922
- Winner's share: $1,260,000 €914,040

Champion
- (United States) Tiger Woods
- 272 (−8)

Location in the United States
Location in Oklahoma

The 2007 PGA Championship was the 89th PGA Championship, played August 9–12 at Southern Hills Country Club in Tulsa, Oklahoma. Defending champion Tiger Woods won his fourth PGA Championship and 13th major title, two strokes ahead of runner-up Woody Austin.

== Venue ==
Similar to the upgrades it received prior to the 2001 U.S. Open, Southern Hills underwent extensive renovations to prepare for the 2007 PGA Championship, including new greens and renovated bunkers, as well as an upgrade to the clubhouse. A major heatwave gripping the United States impacted playing conditions significantly. The high temperature for the four days of the tournament reached 101, 99, 99, and 102. Joking about the heat after hooking one of his drives into the trees, Colin Montgomerie said "at least it's in the shade".

It was the seventh major championship and fourth PGA Championship at Southern Hills; the three previous winners were Dave Stockton (1970), Raymond Floyd (1982) and Nick Price (1994). The U.S. Open winners were Tommy Bolt (1958), Hubert Green (1977), and Retief Goosen (2001).

=== Course layout ===
Hole	1	2	3	4	5	6	7	8	9	Out	10	11	12	13	14	15	16	17	18	In	Total
Yards	464	488	451	372	653	200	384	245	374	3,631	366	173	458	537	223	413	507	358	465	3,500	7,131
Par	4	4	4	4	5	3	4	3	4	35	4	3	4	5	3	4	4	4	4	35	70

Lengths of the course in previous major championships:

- 6,973 yards (6,376 m), par 70 - 2001 U.S. Open
- 6,834 yards (6,249 m), par 70 - 1994 PGA Championship
- 6,862 yards (6,275 m), par 70 - 1982 PGA Championship
- 6,873 yards (6,285 m), par 70 - 1977 U.S. Open
- 6,962 yards (6,366 m), par 70 - 1970 PGA Championship
- 6,907 yards (6,316 m), par 70 - 1958 U.S. Open

== Field ==
1. All former PGA Champions
2. The last five U.S. Open Champions (2003 through 2007)
3. The last five Masters Champions (2003 through 2007)
4. The last five Open Champions (2003 through 2007)
5. Current PGA Seniors' Champion (2007)
6. The 15 low scorers and ties in the 2006 PGA Championship
7. The 20 low scorers in the 2007 PGA Professional National Championship (formerly CPC)
8. The 70 leaders in official money standings from the 2006 International through the 2007 Canadian Open
9. Members of the 2006 United States Ryder Cup team
10. Winners of tournaments co-sponsored or approved by the PGA Tour from the 2006 PGA Championship to the 2007 PGA Championship (does not include Pro-Am and Team competitions).
11. In addition, the PGA reserves the right to invite additional players not included in the categories listed above.
12. The 156-player field will be filled (in order) by those players below 70th place in official money standings (#8 above).

== Round summaries ==
=== First round ===
Thursday, August 9, 2007

Graeme Storm led the field after the first round by shooting a bogey-free 65 (−5). Storm is playing in his first PGA Championship. Defending champion Tiger Woods began his campaign for his 13th major victory by shooting a 71 (+1). Other notable scores include: John Daly, currently ranked 423rd in the world, shooting a 67 (−3); Brad Lardon shot the best round of the day among those who qualified for the tournament through the PGA Professional National Championship by shooting an even-par 70; U.S. Open champion Ángel Cabrera shot a disappointing 81 (+11), largely due to a septuple-bogey 10 on the par 3 6th hole; Retief Goosen, the last major champion at Southern Hills (2001 U.S. Open), shot an even-par 70 including an eagle and a double-bogey. The scoring average for the round was 74.29 (+4.29) with 12 players under par. The par 4 18th hole ranked the toughest with a scoring average of 4.49 (+0.49). The par 3 11th hole was the easiest of the day with a scoring average of 2.97 (−0.03), the only hole that played under par.

Place	Player	Score	To par
1	(England) Graeme Storm	65	−5
2	(United States) John Daly	67	−3
T3	(Canada) Stephen Ames	68	−2
T3	(United States) Woody Austin	68	−2
T3	(United States) Arron Oberholser	68	−2
T6	(Austria) Markus Brier	69	−1
T6	(Republic of Ireland) Pádraig Harrington	69	−1
T6	(Australia) Geoff Ogilvy	69	−1
T6	(Australia) John Senden	69	−1
T6	(Colombia) Camilo Villegas	69	−1
T6	(England) Lee Westwood	69	−1
T6	(United States) Mark Wilson	69	−1

=== Second round ===
Friday, August 10, 2007

Tiger Woods scored a 63, tying the record for the lowest single-round score at a major championship. The feat had been previously accomplished 22 times by 20 other players, and also tied the course record set by Raymond Floyd in the 1982 PGA Championship. His birdie putt on the 18th hole for the record outright horseshoed around the cup but did not fall. Local fan favorite and former Oklahoma State golfer Scott Verplank also had a good round with a score of 66. The cut was at 145 (+5) and 72 players advanced. Only two PGA club professionals made the cut. Jim Furyk and Vijay Singh were among those who missed the cut. The scoring average for the round was 72.80 (+2.80) with 24 players under par for the round.

Place	Player	Score	To par
1	(United States) Tiger Woods	71-63=134	−6
2	(United States) Scott Verplank	70-66=136	−4
T3	(Canada) Stephen Ames	68-69=137	−3
T3	(Australia) Geoff Ogilvy	69-68=137	−3
5	(United States) Woody Austin	68-70=138	−2
T6	(Sweden) Niclas Fasth	71-68=139	−1
T6	(United States) Pat Perez	70-69=139	−1
T6	(Australia) John Senden	69-70=139	−1
T9	(United States) John Daly	67-73=140	E
T9	(South Africa) Ernie Els	72-68=140	E
T9	(Republic of Ireland) Paul McGinley	74-66=140	E
T9	(United States) Arron Oberholser	68-72=140	E
T9	(Australia) Adam Scott	72-68=140	E
T9	(Colombia) Camilo Villegas	69-71=140	E

=== Third round ===
Saturday, August 11, 2007

Tiger Woods stretched his lead to three strokes, and has held at least a share of the 54-hole lead in a major 13 times. He was in the final group of three out of the four major championships in 2007. Boo Weekley shot the low round of the day, a five-under par 65. Sergio García was disqualified after the third round for signing an incorrect scorecard. Had he signed it correctly, he would have been at 219 (+9) in a tie for 63rd place. The scoring average for the round was 71.92 (+1.92) with 15 players under par for the round.

Place	Player	Score	To par
1	(United States) Tiger Woods	71-63-69=203	−7
2	(Canada) Stephen Ames	68-69-69=206	−4
3	(United States) Woody Austin	68-70-69=207	−3
4	(Australia) John Senden	69-70-69=208	−2
5	(South Africa) Ernie Els	72-68-69=209	−1
T6	(South Korea) K. J. Choi	71-71-68=210	E
T6	(Australia) Nathan Green	75-68-67=210	E
T6	(United States) Arron Oberholser	68-72-70=210	E
T6	(Australia) Adam Scott	72-68-70=210	E
T6	(United States) Kevin Sutherland	73-69-68=210	E
T6	(United States) Scott Verplank	70-66-74=210	E
T6	(United States) Boo Weekley	76-69-65=210	E

=== Final round ===
Sunday, August 12, 2007

Tiger Woods claimed his fourth PGA Championship and improved to 13–0 in major championships when holding at least a share of the 54-hole lead. He led by as many as five strokes in the third and fourth rounds. However, his bogey on the 14th hole, coupled with Woody Austin's third consecutive birdie at the 13th, whittled Woods' lead down to a single stroke. Woods rebounded, however, with a birdie on the 15th hole, and then parred in to claim the championship. Simon Dyson shot the low round of the day with a 64 (−6). The scoring average for the round was 71.82 (+1.82) with 16 players under par for the round.

Final Leaderboard
Place	Player	Score	To par	Money ($)
1	(United States) Tiger Woods	71-63-69-69=272	−8	1,260,000
2	(United States) Woody Austin	68-70-69-67=274	−6	756,000
3	(South Africa) Ernie Els	72-68-69-66=275	−5	476,000
T4	(United States) Arron Oberholser	68-72-70-69=279	−1	308,000
T4	(Australia) John Senden	69-70-69-71=279	−1	308,000
T6	(England) Simon Dyson	73-71-72-64=280	E	227,500
T6	(South Africa) Trevor Immelman	75-70-66-69=280	E	227,500
T6	(Australia) Geoff Ogilvy	69-68-74-69=280	E	227,500
T9	(United States) Kevin Sutherland	73-69-68-71=281	+1	170,333
T9	(United States) Scott Verplank	70-66-74-71=281	+1	170,333
T9	(United States) Boo Weekley	76-69-65-71=281	+1	170,333

==== Scorecard ====
Hole	1	2	3	4	5	6	7	8	9	10	11	12	13	14	15	16	17	18
Par	4	4	4	4	5	3	4	3	4	4	3	4	5	3	4	4	4	4
(United States) Woods	−7	−6	−6	−7	−7	−7	−8	−9	−8	−8	−8	−8	−8	−7	−8	−8	−8	−8
(United States) Austin	−3	−3	−4	−4	−4	−4	−3	−3	−3	−3	−4	−5	−6	−6	−6	−6	−6	−6
(South Africa) Els	−1	−1	−2	−2	−3	−3	−3	−4	−4	−5	−5	−4	−5	−6	−6	−5	−5	−5
(United States) Oberholser	+1	+2	+2	+2	+2	+2	+2	+1	+1	+1	E	E	−1	−1	−1	−1	−1	−1
(Australia) Senden	−1	E	+1	+1	+1	+1	+1	+2	+2	+2	+2	+1	E	E	−1	−1	−1	−1
(Canada) Ames	−3	−2	−3	−3	−2	−2	−2	−2	−1	−1	−1	E	+1	+2	+3	+3	+2	+2

Cumulative tournament scores, relative to par

Birdie	Bogey

== Television ==
Television coverage in the United States was provided by TNT and CBS.
