= 1977 U.S. Open (golf) =

Tournament information
- Dates: June 16–19, 1977
- Location: Tulsa, Oklahoma; 36.070°N 95.946°W
- Course: Southern Hills Country Club
- Organized by: USGA
- Tour: PGA Tour

Statistics
- Par: 70
- Length: 6,873 yards (6,285 m)
- Field: 153 players, 60 after cut
- Cut: 147 (+7)
- Winner's share: $45,000

Champion
- (United States) Hubert Green
- 278 (−2)
- Location in the United States Location in Oklahoma

The 1977 U.S. Open was the 77th U.S. Open, held June 16–19 at Southern Hills Country Club in Tulsa, Oklahoma. Hubert Green won the first of his two major titles, one stroke ahead of runner-up Lou Graham, the 1975 champion.

Green began the final round with the lead, but 11 players were within three shots. Graham made a charge on the back nine, collecting birdies at 12, 14, 15, and 16 en route to a 68 (−2) and a 279 (−1) total. With four holes to play, Green needed to play even-par to win the championship. As he stepped off the 14th green, however, he was approached by tournament officials and a lieutenant with the Tulsa police, who told him that they had received a phone call threatening to assassinate Green while he played the 15th hole. Green decided to play on, then proceeded to hit his drive into a tree—which probably saved it from going out of bounds. He managed to hit his approach to 35 feet (11 m) and two-putt for par without incident. Green birdied the 16th and took a two-stroke lead to the 18th tee. Although he struggled on the hole, he managed to make a four-footer for bogey and the victory.

This year marked the final U.S. Open appearance by Sam Snead, two-time champion Julius Boros, and Tommy Bolt, who had won the 1958 Open at Southern Hills. All three received exemptions by the USGA, and all three missed the cut. This was the first time that the television broadcast of the U.S. Open covered all 18 holes of the final round.

It was the third major championship at Southern Hills; it previously hosted the U.S. Open in 1958 and the PGA Championship in 1970. The U.S. Open returned in 2001 and the PGA Championship in 1982, 1994, 2007, and 2022. It's also slated to host the PGA Championship in 2032.

== Course layout ==
hole	1	2	3	4	5	6	7	8	9	Out	10	11	12	13	14	15	16	17	18	In	Total
Yards	447	459	406	366	614	175	383	215	373	3,438	375	165	444	465	207	407	569	354	449	3,435	6,873
Par	4	4	4	4	5	3	4	3	4	35	4	3	4	4	3	4	5	4	4	35	70

== Round summaries ==
=== First round ===
Thursday, June 16, 1977

Place	Player	Score	To par
T1	(United States) Terry Diehl	69	−1
T1	(United States) Rod Funseth	69	−1
T1	(United States) Hubert Green	69	−1
T1	(United States) Grier Jones	69	−1
T1	(Argentina) Florentino Molina	69	−1
T1	(United States) Larry Nelson	69	−1
T1	(United States) Tom Purtzer	69	−1
T8	(United States) Sam Adams	70	E
T8	(United States) George Burns	70	E
T8	(United States) Al Geiberger	70	E
T8	(United States) Morris Hatalsky	70	E
T8	(United States) Joe Inman	70	E
T8	(United States) Steve Melnyk	70	E
T8	(United States) Mike Morley	70	E
T8	(United States) Don Padgett	70	E
T8	(United States) Arnold Palmer	70	E
T8	(United States) Bob E. Smith	70	E

=== Second round ===
Friday, June 17, 1977

Place	Player	Score	To par
1	(United States) Hubert Green	69-67=136	−4
2	(United States) Terry Diehl	69-68=137	−3
3	(United States) Tom Purtzer	69-69=138	−2
T4	(United States) Sam Adams	70-69=139	−1
T4	(United States) Rod Funseth	69-70=139	−1
T4	(South Africa) Gary Player	72-67=139	−1
T7	(United States) Jay Haas	72-68=140	E
T7	(United States) Joe Inman	70-70=140	E
T9	(United States) Wally Armstrong	71-70=141	+1
T9	(United States) Andy Bean	71-70=141	+1
T9	(United States) Al Geiberger	70-71=141	+1
T9	(England) Peter Oosterhuis	71-70=141	+1

Amateurs: Miller (+6), Fought (+7), Zabel (+9), Sander (+14), Choate (+15), Sonnier (+15), Cook (+16), King (+16), Gregg (+20), Rheim (+29).

=== Third round ===
Saturday, June 18, 1977

Place	Player	Score	To par
1	(United States) Hubert Green	69-67-72=208	−2
2	(United States) Andy Bean	71-70-68=209	−1
T3	(United States) Terry Diehl	69-68-73=210	E
T3	(United States) Gary Jacobson	73-70-67=210	E
T3	(United States) Don Padgett	70-74-66=210	E
T3	(South Africa) Gary Player	72-67-71=210	E
T3	(United States) Tom Purtzer	69-69-72=210	E
T3	(United States) Tom Weiskopf	71-71-68=210	E
T9	(United States) Wally Armstrong	71-70-70=211	+1
T9	(United States) Rod Funseth	69-70-72=211	+1
T9	(United States) Lou Graham	72-71-68=211	+1
T9	(United States) Jay Haas	72-68-71=211	+1

=== Final round ===
Sunday, June 19, 1977

Place	Player	Score	To par	Money ($)
1	(United States) Hubert Green	69-67-72-70=278	−2	45,000
2	(United States) Lou Graham	72-71-68-68=279	−1	23,500
3	(United States) Tom Weiskopf	71-71-68-71=281	+1	16,000
4	(United States) Tom Purtzer	69-69-72-72=282	+2	13,000
T5	(United States) Jay Haas	72-68-71-72=283	+3	10,875
T5	(United States) Gary Jacobson	73-70-67-73=283	+3	10,875
T7	(United States) Terry Diehl	69-68-73-74=284	+4	8,000
T7	(United States) Lyn Lott	73-73-68-70=284	+4	8,000
T7	(United States) Tom Watson	74-72-71-67=284	+4	8,000
T10	(United States) Rod Funseth	69-70-72-74=285	+5	4,100
T10	(United States) Al Geiberger	70-71-75-69=285	+5	4,100
T10	(United States) Mike McCullough	73-73-69-70=285	+5	4,100
T10	(United States) Jack Nicklaus	74-68-71-72=285	+5	4,100
T10	(England) Peter Oosterhuis	71-70-74-70=285	+5	4,100
T10	(South Africa) Gary Player	72-67-71-75=285	+5	4,100

Amateurs: Lindy Miller (+19), John Fought (+22)

==== Scorecard ====
Final round

Hole	1	2	3	4	5	6	7	8	9	10	11	12	13	14	15	16	17	18
Par	4	4	4	4	5	3	4	3	4	4	3	4	4	3	4	5	4	4
(United States) Green	−2	−2	−3	−4	−4	−4	−4	−4	−3	−2	−2	−2	−2	−2	−2	−3	−3	−2
(United States) Graham	+2	+3	+3	+2	+3	+3	+3	+3	+3	+3	+3	+2	+2	+1	E	−1	−1	−1
(United States) Weiskopf	E	+1	+1	+1	+1	+1	+2	+2	+2	+2	+3	+3	+3	+2	+1	E	E	+1
(United States) Purtzer	E	E	E	E	E	E	E	−1	−1	−1	−1	−1	−1	+1	+1	+1	+1	+2
(United States) Haas	+2	+2	+2	+2	+2	+2	+2	+2	+2	+1	+1	+2	+2	+2	+3	+2	+3	+3
(United States) Jacobson	+1	+1	+1	+2	+2	+2	+2	+2	+2	+2	+2	+2	+2	+1	+2	+2	+2	+3
(United States) Bean	E	E	E	E	E	+1	+2	+2	+2	+2	+3	+5	+6	+6	+6	+7	+7	+8

Cumulative tournament scores, relative to par

Birdie	Bogey	Double bogey
