= South Hills, Gauteng =

South Hills Suidheuwels
- Location within Gauteng Location within South Africa
- Coordinates: 26.249°S 28.079°E
- Country: South Africa
- Province: Gauteng
- Municipality: City of Johannesburg
- Main Place: Johannesburg
- Established: 1942
  - Councillor: (DA)

Area
  - Total: 1.20 km^{2} (0.46 sq mi)

Population (2011)
  - Total: 8,715
  - Density: 7,260/km^{2} (18,800/sq mi)

Racial makeup (2011)
  - Black African: 51.0%
  - Coloured: 12.1%
  - Indian/Asian: 3.0%
  - White: 33.4%
  - Other: 0.5%

First languages (2011)
  - Afrikaans: 31.4%
  - English: 24.9%
  - Zulu: 13.5%
  - Xhosa: 7.2%
  - Other: 23.0%
- Time zone: UTC+2 (SAST)
- Postal code (street): 2197
- PO box: 2136
- Area code: 011
- Website: www.joburg.org.za

South Hills is a suburb of Johannesburg, South Africa. Also known as Suidheuwels in Afrikaans, it is about 20 minutes drive from Johannesburg Central. It is located in Region F of the City of Johannesburg Metropolitan Municipality.

== History ==
Prior to the discovery of gold on the Witwatersrand in 1886, the suburb lay on land on one of the original farms called Klipriviersberg. It was originally called Welfare Park when it was established as a suburb on 23 September 1942. It obtained its current name in 1962, found in hills in the south of Johannesburg.

== Geography ==
=== Communities ===
South Hills also consists of numerous old council houses.

== Education ==
South Hills has four schools namely Montanus Primary School (formerly Suidrand Laerskool), Suidheuwels Laerskool, Crestview Primary school and Diversity High school (formerly J.G. Strijdom Hoerskool).

== Infrastructure ==
=== Transportation ===
Municipal buses cover the main routes from South Hills into Johannesburg Central.
