= South Hills High School =

South Hills High School can refer to:

- South Hills High School (West Covina, California)
- South Hills High School (Texas) in Fort Worth, Texas
- South Hills Catholic High School, a former school in Pittsburgh, Pennsylvania
