= Southern Hills Counseling Center =

- Founded: 1968
- Region served: Dubois, Perry, Spencer, Orange, and Crawford Counties in Southwestern Indiana, United States
- Services: Mental health and substance abuse treatment
- Website: www.southernhills.org

Southern Hills Counseling Center, Inc. is a not-for-profit community mental health center specializing on mental health and substance abuse treatment.

== History ==
Southern Hills Counseling Center was established and incorporated in 1968 with its home office located in Dubois County, Indiana. It also has offices in Perry, Spencer, Orange, and Crawford Counties in Southwestern Indiana. The center is governed by an 11-member volunteer Board of Directors.

The center has over 150 full and part-time staff members at its four residential facilities and five county offices across Indiana. The center is CARF accredited since 1997. It received the most recent three years of accreditation in April 2015.

== Services ==
Southern Hills Counseling Center provides mental health therapy, and case management services to children, adolescents, adults, couples, and families. The center also provides Employee Assistance Programs (EAP) to local employers, residential services to adults with long-term and persistent mental illness, and inpatient services in conjunction with Memorial Hospital, Indiana.

== See also ==
- Community mental health service
- Center for Substance Abuse Treatment
