= Southern Hills Country Club =

Golf and country club in Tulsa, Oklahoma

Coordinates: 36°4′21.49″N 95°56′58.77″W

- Interactive map of Southern Hills Country Club

Club information
- Location: Tulsa, Oklahoma, U.S.
- Established: 1936
- Type: Private
- Total holes: 27
- Website: southernhillscc.com

Front Nine / Back Nine Course
- Designed by: Perry Maxwell (1936) Gil Hanse & Jim Wagner (2019 renovation)
- Par: 71 (Note: The course par has been reduced to 70 for some tournaments, including major championships.)
- Length: 7,481 yards (6,841 m)
- Course rating: 78.2
- Slope rating: 142

West Nine Course
- Designed by: Ben Crenshaw / Bill Coore
- Par: 35
- Length: 2,969 yards (2,715 m)
- Course rating: 36.3

Southern Hills Country Club is a private golf and country club in Tulsa, Oklahoma.

== History ==
The club was established in 1935 from land donated by multimillionaire oilman Waite Phillips (Frank Phillips, Waite's brother, was the namesake and founder of the predecessor to Phillips 66. Waite worked with his brother for a time before starting his own oil company). Phillips had earned an oil fortune and, upon the crash of the stock market, Phillips became The First National Bank of Tulsa's chairman. With his oil money and with his reputation, Bill Warren and Cecil Canary asked Phillips to sponsor the development of a new country club. The boosters argued that there was the need for a family-oriented club that would include a swimming pool, stable, horseback trails, polo field, skeet range, tennis courts, clubhouse and golf course. Phillips was skeptical of this proposition, and in response he told Warren and Canary that they had a couple of weeks to assume 150 pledges to become members of this club, with each of those pledges paying $1,000 each, to ensure his cooperation. The construction costs were raised by the founding members. The clubhouse, designed in "English country manor" style by Tulsa architects John Duncan Forsyth and Donald McCormick, opened on October 17, 1936; the clubhouse was extensively renovated during a three-year project prior to the 2007 PGA tournament.

=== Murder ===
On May 27, 1981, Roger Wheeler, a Tulsa businessman and owner of Miami's World Jai Alai, was murdered in the parking lot of the club. The killing was ordered by Winter Hill Gang mobster Whitey Bulger, who discovered that Wheeler had uncovered the gang's ongoing embezzlement from the jai alai organization.

== Golf courses and amenities ==
Once the money was raised, the pledges signed, and the land was donated, the main 18-hole golf course was laid out by golf course designer Perry Maxwell. The course was later on renovated by Keith Foster in 1999. Maxwell, a friend of Phillips, oversaw the entire project and its construction.

There is also a 9-hole West Course that was designed by Ben Crenshaw in 1992. Southern Hills also has the typical facilities of a country club, including extensive banqueting facilities, a fitness center, swimming and diving pools, and tennis courts. Southern Hills offers swimming, personal training, and tennis instruction. The course is ranked No. 30 among Golf Digest's 2013–2014 "America's 100 Greatest Golf Courses".

=== Course layout ===
Tee	Rating/Slope	1	2	3	4	5	6	7	8	9	Out	10	11	12	13	14	15	16	17	18	In	Total
2022 PGA	Championship	468	500	472	377	656	214	489	251	391	3,818	441	173	456	632	230	417	527	371	491	3,738	7,556
Par		4	4	4	4	5	3	4	3	4	35	4	3	4	5	3	4	4	4	4	35	70
Pink	78.2/142	472	500	444	377	656	226	443	220	395	3,733	406	173	461	632	230	417	567	371	491	3,748	7,481
Blue	74.7/139	451	440	406	356	600	170	424	200	367	3,414	374	150	436	529	192	388	522	336	423	3,350	6,764
Green	M:72.2/134 W:76.6/135	422	409	377	330	562	138	388	180	347	3,153	350	150	415	495	171	371	485	315	401	3,153	6,306
Gold	M:69.6/129 W:74.8/129	422	335	339	314	468	113	366	150	324	2,831	332	128	391	463	146	339	447	287	379	2,912	5,743
White	M:66.7/123 W:70.6/123	384	306	279	265	435	113	349	121	295	2,547	254	107	358	413	122	280	424	262	332	2,552	5,099
Par	Men's	4	4	4	4	5	3	4	3	4	35	4	3	4	5	3	4	5	4	4	36	71
Par	Women's	5	4	4	4	5	3	4	3	4	36	4	3	5	5	3	4	5	4	5	38	74

Lengths of the course in previous major championships:

U.S. Open Championship

- 2001: 6,973 yards , Par 70
- 1977: 6,873 yards , Par 70
- 1958: 6,907 yards , Par 70

PGA Championship

- 2022: 7,556 yards , Par 70
- 2007: 7,131 yards , Par 70
- 1994: 6,834 yards , Par 70
- 1982: 6,862 yards , Par 70
- 1970: 6,962 yards , Par 70

Senior PGA Championship

- 2021: 6,968 yards , Par 70

Hole	1	2	3	4	5	6	7	8	9	Out	10	11	12	13	14	15	16	17	18	In	Total
Yards	451	455	406	377	600	188	424	220	395	3,516	406	173	436	529	204	417	485	342	460	3,452	6,968
Par	4	4	4	4	5	3	4	3	4	35	4	3	4	5	3	4	4	4	4	35	70

== Golf tournaments hosted at Southern Hills ==
Southern Hills has hosted eight major championships for men, including the U.S. Open three times (1958, 1977, 2001) and five PGA Championships (1970, 1982, 1994, 2007, 2022). It is the only course to host the PGA Championship five times. Southern Hills also hosted the first-ever U.S. Women's Mid-Amateur in 1987, and the U.S. Women's Amateur was played at Southern Hills in 1946 and 2024.

=== Winners ===
Year	Tournament	Winner
1946	U.S. Women's Amateur	(United States) Babe Zaharias
1953	U.S. Junior Amateur	(United States) Rex Baxter
**1958**	U.S. Open	(United States) Tommy Bolt
1961	U.S. Senior Amateur	(United States) Dexter Daniels
1965	U.S. Amateur	(United States) Bob Murphy
**1970**	PGA Championship	(United States) Dave Stockton
**1977**	U.S. Open (2)	(United States) Hubert Green
**1982**	PGA Championship (2)	(United States) Raymond Floyd
1987	U.S. Women's Mid-Amateur	(United States) Cindy Schofield
**1994**	PGA Championship (3)	(Zimbabwe) Nick Price
1995	Tour Championship	(United States) Billy Mayfair
1996	Tour Championship (2)	(United States) Tom Lehman
**2001**	U.S. Open (3)	(South Africa) Retief Goosen
**2007**	PGA Championship (4)	(United States) Tiger Woods
2009	U.S. Amateur (2)	(South Korea) An Byeong-hun
2021	Senior PGA Championship	(Germany) Alex Čejka
**2022**	PGA Championship (5)	(United States) Justin Thomas
2024	U.S. Women's Amateur (2)	(Philippines) Rianne Malixi
**2032**	PGA Championship (6)	

Bolded years are major championships on the PGA Tour.
