= 2001 U.S. Open (golf) =

Coordinates: 36.070°N 95.946°W

Tournament information
- Dates: June 14–18, 2001
- Location: Tulsa, Oklahoma
- Course: Southern Hills Country Club
- Organized by: USGA
- Tours: PGA Tour; European Tour; Japan Golf Tour

Statistics
- Par: 70
- Length: 6,973 yards (6,376 m)
- Field: 156 players, 79 after cut
- Cut: 146 (+6)
- Prize fund: $5,000,000 €5,878,883
- Winner's share: $900,000 €1,058,199

Champion
- (South Africa) Retief Goosen
- 276 (−4), playoff

Location in the United States
Location in Oklahoma

The 2001 United States Open Championship was the 101st U.S. Open, held June 14–18 at Southern Hills Country Club in Tulsa, Oklahoma. The U.S. Open returned to Southern Hills for the first time since 1977. Retief Goosen won the first of his two U.S. Open titles in an 18-hole Monday playoff, two strokes ahead of runner-up Mark Brooks. The tournament was also notable for ending defending champion Tiger Woods' run of four consecutive major championship wins, the "Tiger Slam;" he finished seven strokes back in a tie for twelfth. Woods reclaimed the U.S. Open title the following year, and won the PGA Championship at Southern Hills in 2007.

The total purse was $5 million with a winner's share of $900,000.

At the end of the final round on Sunday, Brooks three-putted his way out of the lead on the 72nd hole. In the final pairing, co-leaders Goosen and Stewart Cink both had approach shots from the 18th fairway. Cink missed the green long and then three-putted from fifteen feet (4.5 m) to double bogey. Goosen had ten feet (3 m) for birdie, but also three-putted to tie Brooks, forcing the next-day playoff.

== Course ==
This U.S. Open was the third at Southern Hills and its sixth major championship. Former Open champions were Tommy Bolt in 1958, and Hubert Green in 1977. The course also previously hosted the PGA Championship in 1970, 1982, and 1994, all played in August, and later hosted the 2007 event.

=== Course layout ===
Hole	1	2	3	4	5	6	7	8	9	Out	10	11	12	13	14	15	16	17	18	In	Total
Yards	454	467	408	368	642	175	382	225	374	3,495	374	165	456	534	215	412	491	365	466	3,478	6,973
Par	4	4	4	4	5	3	4	3	4	35	4	3	4	5	3	4	4	4	4	35	70

Lengths of the course in previous major championships:

- 6,834 yards (6,249 m), par 70 - 1994 PGA Championship
- 6,862 yards (6,275 m), par 70 - 1982 PGA Championship
- 6,873 yards (6,285 m), par 70 - 1977 U.S. Open
- 6,962 yards (6,366 m), par 70 - 1970 PGA Championship
- 6,907 yards (6,316 m), par 70 - 1958 U.S. Open

== Field ==
Sixty-seven players were exempt and the remainder earned their place through sectional qualifying."58 Players Exempt For 2001 U.S. Open". (Note: (a) – denotes amateur.)

=== Exemptions ===
1. Last 10 U.S. Open Champions

- Ernie Els (8,9,10,17)
- Lee Janzen
- Steve Jones
- Tom Kite
- Corey Pavin
- Tiger Woods (3,4,5,6,8,9,11,12,17)

2. The U.S. Amateur champion

- Jeff Quinney (a)

3. Last five Masters Champions

- José María Olazábal (8,10,17)
- Mark O'Meara (4)
- Vijay Singh (5,8,9,11,17)

4. Last five British Open Champions

- Paul Lawrie
- Tom Lehman (9,17)
- Justin Leonard (9,17)

5. Last five PGA Champions

- Mark Brooks
- Davis Love III (9,11,17)

6. The Players Champion

7. The U.S. Senior Open Champion

- Hale Irwin

8. Top 15 finishers and ties in the 2000 U.S. Open

- Paul Azinger (9,17)
- Michael Campbell (10,14,17)
- Stewart Cink (9,17)
- David Duval (9,17)
- Nick Faldo
- Retief Goosen (10,17)
- Pádraig Harrington (10,17)
- John Huston (9,17)
- Miguel Ángel Jiménez (10,17)
- Loren Roberts (9,17)
- Lee Westwood (10,17)

9. Top 30 leaders on the 2000 PGA Tour official money list

- Robert Allenby (12,17)
- Stuart Appleby (17)
- Notah Begay III (12,17)
- Mark Calcavecchia (11,17)
- Chris DiMarco
- Steve Flesch
- Carlos Franco
- Jim Furyk (17)
- Franklin Langham
- Bob May (17)
- Phil Mickelson (11,12,17)
- Jesper Parnevik (12,17)
- Chris Perry (17)
- Nick Price (17)
- Hal Sutton (11,17)
- David Toms (11,12,17)
- Kirk Triplett (17)
- Scott Verplank (17)
- Mike Weir (17)

10. Top 15 on the 2000 European Tour Order of Merit

- Thomas Bjørn (17)
- Ángel Cabrera (14,17)
- Darren Clarke (17)
- José Cóceres (17)
- Pierre Fulke (17)
- Colin Montgomerie (17)
- Gary Orr
- Phillip Price

11. Top 10 on the PGA Tour official money list, as of May 28

- Joe Durant (12,17)
- Brad Faxon (17)
- Frank Lickliter (17)

12. Winners of multiple PGA Tour events from April 26, 2000, through June 3, 2001

13. Special exemptions selected by the USGA

14. Top 2 from the 2001 European Tour Order of Merit, as of May 28

15. Top 2 on the 2000 Japan Golf Tour money list, provided they are within the top 75 of the Official World Golf Rankings at that time

- Shingo Katayama (17)
- Toru Taniguchi

16. Top 2 on the 2000–01 PGA Tour of Australasia money list, provided they are within the top 75 of the Official World Golf Rankings at that time

- Neither was inside the top 75.

17. Top 50 on the Official World Golf Rankings list, as of May 28

- Sergio García
- Scott Hoch
- Toshimitsu Izawa
- Bernhard Langer
- Rocco Mediate
- Dennis Paulson
- Eduardo Romero
- Duffy Waldorf

=== Qualifiers ===
Location	Venue	Field	Spots	Qualifiers
Tarzana, California	El Caballero Country Club	76	4	Chris Anderson, Chris Gonzales, Thongchai Jaidee, Anthony Kang
Denver, Colorado	Columbine Country Club	29	2	Kyle Blackman, John Douma
Tampa, Florida	Old Memorial Golf Club	66	4	Jeff Barlow, Jason Dufner, Donnie Hammond, Gary Koch
Atlanta, Georgia	East Lake Golf Club	64	4	Billy Andrade, Joey Maxon, Bryce Molder (a), Charles Raulerson
Chicago, Illinois	Cantigny Golf Club	40	3	Jess Daley, John Harris (a), Marty Schiene
Rockville, Maryland	Woodmont Country Club	48	3	Ben Bates, Olin Browne, Joel Kribel
Kansas City, Missouri	Blue Hills Country Club	25	2	Matt Gogel, Tom Pernice Jr.
Purchase, New York	Old Oaks Country Club and Century Country Club	81	5	Michael Allen, Scott Dunlap, George Frake II, Jim McGovern, Tim Petrovic
Cleveland, Ohio	Kirtland Country Club	22	2	Chad Campbell, Brad Klapprott
Columbus, Ohio	Lakes Golf and Country Club and Double Eagle Golf Club	120	26	Fred Couples, Glen Day, Todd Fischer, Harrison Frazar, Jeff Freeman, Fred Funk, Robert Gamez, Stephen Gangluff, Dudley Hart, Tim Herron, Charles Howell III, Skip Kendall, Peter Lonard, Steve Lowery, John Maginnes, Gary Nicklaus, Carl Paulson, Brett Quigley, Jarmo Sandelin, Chris Smith, Mike Sposa, Steve Stricker, Kevin Sutherland, Esteban Toledo, Bob Tway, Dean Wilson
Memphis, Tennessee	Colonial Country Club	135	29	Briny Baird, Rich Beem, Ronnie Black, Jay Don Blake, Tom Byrum, Brandel Chamblee, K. J. Choi, Robert Damron, Bob Estes, Dan Forsman, Paul Goydos, Mathias Grönberg, Jeff Hart, Brian Henninger, Gabriel Hjertstedt, Mike Hulbert, Tripp Isenhour, Brandt Jobe, Kevin Johnson, Pete Jordan, J. L. Lewis, Jeff Maggert, Shaun Micheel, David Peoples, Dicky Pride, Mark Wiebe, Jay Williamson, Willie Wood, Richard Zokol
Dallas, Texas	Northwood Club	43	3	Clark Dennis, Jimmy Walker, Chris Wall
Snoqualmie, Washington	TPC Snoqualmie Ridge	21	2	Wes Heffernan, Scott Johnson

== Round summaries ==
=== First round ===
Thursday, June 14, 2001
Friday, June 15, 2001

Severe thunderstorms halted play Thursday afternoon with only 66 players completing their rounds. South Africa's Goosen completed an opening round of 66, four-under-par, to lead the way. Goosen resumed his unfinished round at three-under-par and raced to six-under, but bogeys at the 16th and 17th took the edge off his round. However, it was enough to earn him a one-stroke lead over three-time champion Hale Irwin and Canadian Mike Weir with tour journeyman J. L. Lewis one stroke further back. Irwin, age 56, won his last U.S. Open title in 1990; he capped his opening 67 (−3) with a birdie at the treacherous par-four 18th. Woods could only manage a first round of 74 (+4), eight shots off the lead. He bogeyed the ninth, before recording his first birdie of the round at the 15th. But even that could not spark a revival in his fortunes as he bogeyed the last.

Place	Player	Score	To par
1	(South Africa) Retief Goosen	66	−4
T2	(United States) Hale Irwin	67	−3
T2	(Canada) Mike Weir	67	−3
4	(United States) J. L. Lewis	68	−2
T5	(United States) Stewart Cink	69	−1
T5	(United States) Chris DiMarco	69	−1
T5	(Japan) Toshimitsu Izawa	69	−1
T5	(United States) Jeff Maggert	69	−1
T5	(United States) Loren Roberts	69	−1
T10	(Argentina) Ángel Cabrera	70	E
T10	(United States) Mark Calcavecchia	70	E
T10	(Argentina) José Cóceres	70	E
T10	(United States) David Duval	70	E
T10	(United States) Bob Estes	70	E
T10	(United States) Jim Furyk	70	E
T10	(Spain) Sergio García	70	E
T10	(United States) Matt Gogel	70	E
T10	(United States) Phil Mickelson	70	E
T10	(United States) Corey Pavin	70	E
T10	(United States) Hal Sutton	70	E

=== Second round ===
Friday, June 15, 2001
Saturday, June 16, 2001

The delay created by Thursday's thunderstorms meant 33 players could not finish the second round on Friday, and had to play Saturday morning. The cut line was 146 (+6) with 79 players making the cut. Brooks fired a 64 (−6) Friday to grab a share of the lead. Goosen, who led after the first round was completed Friday morning, and Lewis joined Brooks at 136 (−4). Sergio García and Stewart Cink were tied for fourth at two-under par. Phil Mickelson and David Duval, players who briefly flirted with the lead during Woods' run at the Masters in April, were knotted at 139 (−1) after each posted 69 on Friday. Woods shot a 71 for 145 (+5), one stroke ahead of the cut.

Place	Player	Score	To par
T1	(United States) Mark Brooks	72-64=136	−4
T1	(South Africa) Retief Goosen	66-70=136	−4
T1	(United States) J. L. Lewis	68-68=136	−4
T4	(United States) Stewart Cink	69-69=138	−2
T4	(Spain) Sergio García	70-68=138	−2
T6	(United States) David Duval	70-69=139	−1
T6	(United States) Rocco Mediate	71-68=139	−1
T6	(United States) Phil Mickelson	70-69=139	−1
T6	(United States) Matt Gogel	70-69=139	−1
10	(United States) Jim Furyk	70-70=140	E

Amateurs: Molder (+6), Harris (+13), Quinney (+15).

=== Third round ===
Saturday, June 16, 2001

Cink finished with a three-under 67 and a share of the third-round lead with Goosen. One of three leaders at the start of the day, Goosen parred each of the last nine holes despite a number of wayward shots down the stretch. The 32-year-old South African managed a 69 to push the leading total to 205 (−5). Brooks, a co-leader of Goosen's after a tournament-low 64 on Friday, shot even-par 70 to join Rocco Mediate and García in third place at 206 (−4). Mickelson, who ended the day three under, was the first big name to make a charge in the third round. Woods shot a 69 for 214 (+4), nine strokes back in tie for 23rd.

Place	Player	Score	To par
T1	(United States) Stewart Cink	69-69-67=205	−5
T1	(South Africa) Retief Goosen	66-70-69=205	−5
T3	(United States) Mark Brooks	72-64-70=206	−4
T3	(Spain) Sergio García	70-68-68=206	−4
T3	(United States) Rocco Mediate	71-68-67=206	−4
6	(United States) Phil Mickelson	70-69-68=207	−3
T7	(United States) Paul Azinger	74-67-69=210	E
T7	(United States) David Duval	70-69-71=210	E
T9	(United States) Jim Furyk	70-70-71=211	+1
T9	(Canada) Mike Weir	67-76-68=211	+1

=== Final round ===
Sunday, June 17, 2001

Goosen missed a two-foot (0.6 m) par putt at the 72nd hole to fall back into a tie with Brooks, forcing an 18-hole playoff on Monday. Brooks was in the clubhouse when Goosen charged his ten-foot (3 m) birdie putt past the cup. Goosen, after watching his playing partner and co-leader Cink miss a 20-inch (50 cm) putt for bogey, pushed his short par putt by the right edge of the cup. He then sank a short bogey putt to finish regulation alongside Brooks at four-under-par 276. When Goosen and Cink dialed it up to go to five-under, Brooks responded by two-putting for birdie at the par-five 13th. The lead was his after Cink drove into a creek for bogey at 13 and Goosen suffered his first three-putt of the championship at the 14th. Goosen, who stoically battled to hold on to a piece of the top spot all week, knocked his approach at the 15th to the back fringe and rolled in a 12-footer to return to minus-five with Brooks. Brooks' 200-yard (180 m) approach to 18 landed forty feet (12 m) left of the right-side pin placement. His first putt was too hard and sped eight feet (2.4 m) past the hole, and his par try stopped on the right edge. The bogey gave Brooks an even-par 70 and dropped him to four-under. Back at 17, Cink replaced Brooks as co-leader after a brilliant wedge approach over the flag landed past the pin before spinning back to two feet for birdie.

Two players who had been expected to make a charge in the final round - Mickelson and García - blew their chances with poor displays. The most eye-catching performances of the day came from Vijay Singh and Tom Kite, who both stormed to 64 (−6) - the best rounds of the week - and Olin Browne, who sank a hole-in-one at the 11th. Woods, winner of the previous four major championships, failed to make a charge on Sunday and saw his run come to an end. He turned in his second straight 69 to finish seven strokes back, tied for 12th at 283 (+3), snapping streaks of eight straight top-10s in majors and 40 consecutive events under par.

Place	Player	Score	To par	Money ($)
T1	(South Africa) Retief Goosen	66-70-69-71=276	−4	Playoff
T1	(United States) Mark Brooks	72-64-70-70=276	−4	Playoff
3	(United States) Stewart Cink	69-69-67-72=277	−3	340,365
4	(United States) Rocco Mediate	71-68-67-72=278	−2	226,777
T5	(United States) Paul Azinger	74-67-69-71=281	+1	172,912
T5	(United States) Tom Kite	73-72-72-64=281	+1	172,912
T7	(Argentina) Ángel Cabrera	70-71-72-69=282	+2	125,172
T7	(United States) Davis Love III	72-69-71-70=282	+2	125,172
T7	(United States) Phil Mickelson	70-69-68-75=282	+2	125,172
T7	(Fiji) Vijay Singh	74-70-74-64=282	+2	125,172
T7	(United States) Kirk Triplett	72-69-71-70=282	+2	125,172

Amateurs: Molder (+8).

==== Scorecard ====
Final round

Hole	1	2	3	4	5	6	7	8	9	10	11	12	13	14	15	16	17	18
Par	4	4	4	4	5	3	4	3	4	4	3	4	5	3	4	4	4	4
(South Africa) Goosen	−5	−5	−5	−5	−5	−6	−6	−5	−4	−5	−5	−5	−5	−4	−5	−5	−5	−4
(United States) Brooks	−4	−4	−4	−4	−3	−3	−3	−3	−3	−3	−4	−4	−5	−5	−5	−5	−5	−4
(United States) Cink	−5	−5	−5	−5	−4	−4	−4	−4	−4	−4	−5	−5	−4	−4	−4	−4	−5	−3
(United States) Mediate	−5	−5	−4	−5	−5	−4	−4	−3	−4	−3	−2	−2	−2	−1	−1	−1	−1	−2
(United States) Azinger	−1	−1	−1	−1	−1	−1	−1	E	E	E	E	+1	E	+1	+1	+1	+1	+1
(United States) Kite	+6	+6	+6	+6	+6	+7	+6	+5	+5	+4	+3	+3	+2	+2	+2	+2	+1	+1
(United States) Mickelson	−3	−3	−3	−2	−3	−3	−3	−3	−2	−1	−1	−1	E	E	+1	+1	+2	+2
(United States) Woods	+4	+5	+5	+4	+3	+3	+2	+2	+3	+3	+2	+2	+2	+2	+2	+2	+3	+3
(Spain) García	−4	−3	−3	−3	−2	−2	−2	−2	E	E	E	+1	E	E	+1	+2	+3	+3
(United States) Duval	+1	+1	+1	+1	+1	+1	+1	+1	+1	+1	+2	+2	+1	+3	+3	+3	+3	+4

Cumulative tournament scores, relative to par

Birdie	Bogey	Double bogey

=== Playoff ===
Monday, June 18, 2001

In the 18-hole playoff, Brooks birdied the third hole and Goosen the sixth to pull even at one-under par. Brooks bogeyed the seventh and again at the ninth, while Goosen birdied it to go three strokes up at the turn. Brooks bogeyed #10 while Goosen birdied to take a five-shot lead with eight holes to be played. They halved the next six holes, all pars except bogeys at #12, and Goosen maintained his five-stroke lead with just two holes remaining.

A two-shot swing in Brooks' favor at the 17th cut the lead to three, but Brooks, who struggled off the tee all day, sent his final drive into the right-hand rough. He chose a fairway wood for his approach and did well to run his ball into the bunker short and left of the final green. Goosen found the 18th fairway with his drive, then hit a five-iron that landed short of the green and rolled 20 yards (18 m) back down the slope. Taking no chances with his tight uphill lie, Goosen used a putter to knock his ball onto the putting surface, leaving 25 feet (7.6 m) for his par. Brooks blasted out of the trap to three feet and converted for par for a two-over 72. Goosen cautiously left his par putt five-foot (1.5 m) short, then rolled in the clinching putt for an even-par 70 and became just the sixth foreign-born winner of the U.S. Open in the last 70 years. Goosen became the third South African to win the title, joining Gary Player and Ernie Els as champions of the USGA's premier event.

Place	Player	Score	To par	Money ($)
1	(South Africa) Retief Goosen	70	E	900,000
2	(United States) Mark Brooks	72	+2	530,000

==== Scorecard ====
Hole	1	2	3	4	5	6	7	8	9	10	11	12	13	14	15	16	17	18
Par	4	4	4	4	5	3	4	3	4	4	3	4	5	3	4	4	4	4
(South Africa) Goosen	E	E	E	E	E	−1	−1	−1	−2	−3	−3	−2	−2	−2	−2	−2	−1	E
(United States) Brooks	E	E	−1	−1	−1	−1	E	E	+1	+2	+2	+3	+3	+3	+3	+3	+2	+2

Birdie	Bogey

== Quotes ==
"It's amazing and I don't want to consider what it would have felt like if I had lost but I played solid and my putter was warm in places – except yesterday." – Retief Goosen

"It's been a long week, it feels like a year out here." – Retief Goosen

"When I got up this morning, I was more comfortable than I was Sunday morning. I knew I had a 50 percent chance of winning." – Retief Goosen

"I got punished severely in the rough today and that was kind of the difference," – Mark Brooks after his playoff loss.

"I started hitting the ball a lot better a few weeks ago, and just the putter wasn't working. And putting a new putter in the bag last week, it just helped." – Retief Goosen

"To be honest with you I played as hard as I could, I tried on every shot, and there's no regrets." – Tiger Woods after failing to win his fifth straight major championship

"I don't think people really understand how difficult it is on you to keep putting yourself there and the stress it puts on you coming down the back nine on Sunday with a chance to win. More times than not it wears you out." – Tiger Woods

"It's certainly not the finish I would have liked, but out of playing (36) majors now, and not winning any, I'm tired of beating myself up time after time," – Phil Mickelson.

"It was really tough to dig in and concentrate on that second putt because I really didn't think it was really all that important," – Stewart Cink after missing a two-foot putt which ultimately would have put him in the playoff with Goosen and Brooks (since Goosen missed his own two-foot putt seconds later).
