= 1966 Masters Tournament =

- Front cover of the 1966 Masters Guide

Tournament information
- Dates: April 7–11, 1966
- Location: Augusta, Georgia; 33.503°N 82.020°W
- Course: Augusta National Golf Club
- Organized by: Augusta National Golf Club
- Tour: PGA Tour

Statistics
- Par: 72
- Length: 6,980 yards (6,383 m)
- Field: 103 players, 64 after cut
- Cut: 153 (+9)
- Winner's share: $20,000

Champion
- (United States) Jack Nicklaus
- 288 (E), playoff
- Location in the United States Location in Georgia

The 1966 Masters Tournament was the 30th Masters Tournament, held April 7–11 at Augusta National Golf Club in Augusta, Georgia.

Jack Nicklaus, age 26, earned his third Green Jacket in an 18-hole Monday playoff and became the first back-to-back champion at the Masters. He ended regulation at even-par 288, tied with Tommy Jacobs and Gay Brewer. Nicklaus shot a 70 in the extra round on Monday to defeat Jacobs (72) and Brewer (78). Nicklaus' score the previous year in 1965 was significantly lower at 271 (−17), a record which stood for 32 years.

On Sunday, Brewer shot a 33 (−3) on the front nine and then had eight pars as he came to the 72nd hole with a one-shot lead. After hitting his approach shot onto the green, he three-putted from 75 feet (23 m), missing a 5-foot (1.5 m) putt for par to win. This was the last Masters that two-time champion Byron Nelson played in; he shot 76 and 78 and missed the cut by one stroke. The 36-hole cut at 153 (+9) was the highest to date, exceeded only in 1982.

A close friend of Nicklaus was among four that died in a private plane crash in Tennessee on Wednesday, while en route to Augusta from Columbus, Ohio. Nicklaus learned of the incident late that night and responded with a 68 in the first round, but fell back with a 76 on Friday.

It was the fifth of 18 major titles for Nicklaus, and his only successful defense of a major. Three months later, he completed the first of his three career grand slams at Muirfield in the Open Championship. Later back-to-back winners at Augusta were Nick Faldo (1989 and 1990, both playoffs), Tiger Woods (2001 and 2002) and Rory Mcilroy (2025 and 2026).

Terry Dill won the seventh Par 3 contest on Wednesday with a score of 22.

Brewer rebounded and won the tournament the next year, while Nicklaus' attempt at three consecutive titles ended early with a rare missed cut. Jacobs never won a major; he was also a runner-up in the U.S. Open in 1964 at Congressional.

CBS commentator Jack Whitaker referred to the gallery at the end of the 18-hole Monday playoff as a "mob" and was banned from the next five Masters (1967–1971).

== Course ==
Hole	Name	Yards	Par	Hole	Name	Yards	Par
1	White Pine	400	4	10	Camellia	470	4
2	Woodbine	555	5	11	Dogwood	445	4
3	Flowering Peach	355	4	12	Golden Bell	155	3
4	Palm	220	3	13	Azalea	475	5
5	Magnolia	450	4	14	Chinese Fir	420	4
6	Juniper	190	3	15	Firethorn	520	5
7	Pampas	365	4	16	Redbud	190	3
8	Yellow Jasmine	530	5	17	Nandina	400	4
9	Carolina Cherry	420	4	18	Holly	420	4
Out		3,485	36	In		3,495	36
Source:				Total		6,980	72

^ Holes 1, 2, 4, and 11 were later renamed.

== Field ==
1. Masters champions

Jack Burke Jr. (4,10), Doug Ford, Claude Harmon, Ben Hogan (8), Herman Keiser, Cary Middlecoff (2), Byron Nelson (8), Jack Nicklaus (2,4,8,10), Arnold Palmer (2,3,8,11), Henry Picard, Gary Player (2,3,4,8,9), Gene Sarazen, Sam Snead (10), Art Wall Jr.

- Jimmy Demaret, Ralph Guldahl, and Craig Wood did not play.

The following categories only apply to Americans

2. U.S. Open champions (last 10 years)

Tommy Bolt (8), Julius Boros (9,11), Billy Casper (10,11), Gene Littler (8,9,11), Dick Mayer, Ken Venturi (11)

3. The Open champions (last 10 years)

Tony Lema (8,9,11)

4. PGA champions (last 10 years)

Jerry Barber, Dow Finsterwald (8), Jay Hebert, Lionel Hebert, Dave Marr (10,11), Bobby Nichols, Bob Rosburg

5. U.S. Amateur and Amateur champions (last 10 years)

Deane Beman (6,9,a), William C. Campbell (6,7,a), Charles Coe (a), Richard Davies (a), Bob Murphy (7,a), Harvie Ward (a)

- Other champions forfeited their exemptions by turning professional.

6. Members of the 1965 U.S. Walker Cup team

Don Allen (7,a), Dave Eichelberger (a), Downing Gray (a), John Mark Hopkins (a), Dale Morey (a), Billy Joe Patton (a), Ed Tutwiler (a), Ed Updegraff (a)

7. The first eight finishers and ties in the 1965 U.S. Amateur

Tommy Barnes Jr. (a), Ron Cerrudo (a), Bob Dickson (a), Jimmy Grant (a), Bert Greene (a), Rod Horn (a), Cesar Sanudo (a), James Vickers (a)

8. Top 24 players and ties from the 1965 Masters Tournament

Tommy Aaron (10), George Bayer, Frank Beard (9), Terry Dill, Wes Ellis, Al Geiberger (9), Paul Harney, Tommy Jacobs (11), Mason Rudolph (9), Doug Sanders (9), Dan Sikes

9. Top 16 players and ties from the 1965 U.S. Open

Gay Brewer, Raymond Floyd, Billy Maxwell, Steve Oppermann, Dudley Wysong

10. Top eight players and ties from 1965 PGA Championship

Jacky Cupit, Gardner Dickinson, Rod Funseth, Bob McCallister, Bo Wininger

11. Members of the U.S. 1965 Ryder Cup team

Don January, Johnny Pott

12. Two players selected for meritorious records on the fall part of the 1965 PGA Tour

Charles Coody, Randy Glover

13. One player, either amateur or professional, not already qualified, selected by a ballot of ex-Masters champions

Mike Souchak

14. One professional, not already qualified, selected by a ballot of ex-U.S. Open champions

Bob Goalby

15. One amateur, not already qualified, selected by a ballot of ex-U.S. Amateur champions

Bunky Henry (a)

16. Two players, not already qualified, from a points list based on finishes in the winter part of the 1966 PGA Tour

Phil Rodgers, R. H. Sikes

17. Foreign invitations

Peter Alliss, Michael Bonallack (5,a), Peter Butler, Bob Charles (3), Chen Ching-Po, Neil Coles, Bruce Crampton (8), Roberto De Vicenzo, Bruce Devlin (8,9,10), Rodney Foster (a), Jean Garaïalde, Harold Henning, Jimmy Hitchcock, Bernard Hunt, Tomoo Ishii, George Knudson (8), Cobie Legrange, Kel Nagle (3,8,9), Lionel Platts, Luis Silverio (a), Ramón Sota (8), Dave Thomas, George Will

- Numbers in brackets indicate categories that the player would have qualified under had they been American.

== Round summaries ==
=== First round ===
Thursday, April 7, 1966

Place	Player	Score	To par
1	(United States) Jack Nicklaus	68	−4
T2	(United States) Billy Casper	71	−1
T2	(United States) Charles Coe (a)	71	−1
T2	(United States) Don January	71	−1
T2	(United States) Mike Souchak	71	−1
T6	(England) Peter Butler	72	E
T6	(United States) Raymond Floyd	72	E
T6	(United States) Randy Glover	72	E
T6	(United States) Jay Hebert	72	E
T10	(United States) Dow Finsterwald	73	+1
T10	(United States) Lionel Hebert	73	+1
T10	(United States) Rod Horn (a)	73	+1
T10	(Canada) George Knudson	73	+1
T10	(United States) Bob Rosburg	73	+1
T10	(United States) R. H. Sikes	73	+1

=== Second round ===
Friday, April 8, 1966

Place	Player	Score	To par
T1	(England) Peter Butler	72-71=143	−1
T1	(United States) Paul Harney	75-68=143	−1
T3	(United States) Don January	71-73=144	E
T3	(United States) Jack Nicklaus	68-76=144	E
T3	(United States) Arnold Palmer	74-70=144	E
T3	(United States) Bob Rosburg	73-71=144	E
T3	(United States) Doug Sanders	74-70=144	E
T8	(United States) Raymond Floyd	72-73=145	+1
T8	(United States) Ben Hogan	74-71=145	+1
T8	(United States) Mike Souchak	71-74=145	+1

=== Third round ===
Saturday, April 9, 1966

Place	Player	Score	To par
T1	(United States) Tommy Jacobs	75-71-70=216	E
T1	(United States) Jack Nicklaus	68-76-72=216	E
3	(United States) Don January	71-73-73=217	+1
T4	(United States) Gay Brewer	74-72-72=218	+2
T4	(United States) Ben Hogan	74-71-73=218	+2
T4	(United States) Arnold Palmer	74-70-74=218	+2
T7	(United States) Raymond Floyd	72-73-74=219	+3
T7	(United States) Paul Harney	75-68-76=219	+3
T7	(United States) Jay Hebert	72-74-73=219	+3
T7	(United States) Doug Sanders	74-70-75=219	+3

=== Final round ===
Sunday, April 10, 1966

==== Final leaderboard ====
Champion
Silver Cup winner (low amateur)
(a) = amateur
(c) = past champion

Top 10
Place	Player	Score	To par	Money (US$)
T1	(United States) Gay Brewer	74-72-72-70=288	E	Playoff
T1	(United States) Tommy Jacobs	75-71-70-72=288	E	Playoff
T1	(United States) Jack Nicklaus (c)	68-76-72-72=288	E	Playoff
T4	(United States) Arnold Palmer (c)	74-70-74-72=290	+2	5,700
T4	(United States) Doug Sanders	74-70-75-71=290	+2	5,700
T6	(United States) Don January	71-73-73-75=292	+4	3,900
T6	(Canada) George Knudson	73-76-72-71=292	+4	3,900
T8	(United States) Raymond Floyd	72-73-74-74=293	+5	2,500
T8	(United States) Paul Harney	75-68-76-74=293	+5	2,500
T10	(United States) Billy Casper	71-75-76-72=294	+6	1,770
T10	(United States) Jay Hebert	72-74-73-75=294	+6	1,770
T10	(United States) Bob Rosburg	73-71-76-74=294	+6	1,770

Leaderboard below the top 10
Place	Player	Score	To par	Money ($)
T13	(United States) Tommy Aaron	74-73-77-71=295	+7	1,570
T13	(England) Peter Butler	72-71-79-73=295	+7	1,570
T13	(United States) Ben Hogan (c)	74-71-73-77=295	+7	1,570
16	(United States) Ken Venturi	75-74-73-74=296	+8	1,500
T17	(United States) Tommy Bolt	75-72-78-72=297	+9	1,335
T17	(Australia) Bruce Crampton	74-75-71-77=297	+9	1,335
T17	(United States) Terry Dill	75-72-74-76=297	+9	1,335
T17	(United States) Doug Ford (c)	75-73-73-76=297	+9	1,335
T17	(United States) Phil Rodgers	76-73-75-73=297	+9	1,335
T22	(United States) Frank Beard	77-71-77-73=298	+10	1,300
T22	(Chinese Taipei) Chen Ching-Po	75-77-76-70=298	+10	1,300
T22	(Argentina) Roberto De Vicenzo	74-76-74-74=298	+10	1,300
T22	(South Africa) Harold Henning	77-74-70-77=298	+10	1,300
T22	(United States) Tony Lema	74-74-74-76=298	+10	1,300
T22	(United States) Bobby Nichols	77-73-74-74=298	+10	1,300
T28	(United States) Julius Boros	77-73-73-76=299	+11	1,175
T28	(Australia) Bruce Devlin	75-77-72-75=299	+11	1,175
T28	(United States) Gardner Dickinson	76-75-76-72=299	+11	1,175
T28	(United States) Jimmy Grant (a)	74-74-78-73=299	+11	0
T28	(South Africa) Gary Player (c)	74-77-76-72=299	+11	1,175
T33	(United States) Rod Funseth	80-70-76-74=300	+12	1,175
T33	(Spain) Ramón Sota	79-73-77-71=300	+12	1,175
T33	(United States) Mike Souchak	71-74-77-78=300	+12	1,175
T36	(United States) William C. Campbell (a)	76-77-76-72=301	+13	0
T36	(United States) Wes Ellis	76-75-73-77=301	+13	1,175
T36	(United States) Dan Sikes	76-74-75-76=301	+13	1,175
T39	(United States) Billy Maxwell	75-77-77-73=302	+14	1,150
T39	(United States) R. H. Sikes	73-78-74-77=302	+14	1,150
T39	(United States) Dudley Wysong	77-75-73-77=302	+14	1,150
T42	(United States) George Bayer	76-77-76-74=303	+15	1,150
T42	(United States) Sam Snead (c)	77-72-76-78=303	+15	1,150
T44	(United States) Don Allen (a)	74-72-75-83=304	+16	0
T44	(United States) Jack Burke Jr. (c)	75-73-79-77=304	+16	1,150
T44	(United States) Jacky Cupit	78-74-77-75=304	+16	1,150
T44	(United States) Al Geiberger	76-71-79-78=304	+16	1,150
T44	(United States) Gene Littler	76-76-72-80=304	+16	1,150
T44	(United States) Ed Updegraff (a)	76-75-77-76=304	+16	0
T50	(United States) Charles Coe (a)	71-77-85-72=305	+17	0
T50	(United States) Bob Dickson (a)	77-74-75-79=305	+17	0
T50	(United States) Steve Oppermann	74-74-73-84=305	+17	1,125
53	(United States) Randy Glover	72-74-81-79=306	+18	1,125
T54	(United States) Ron Cerrudo (a)	76-77-72-82=307	+19	0
T54	(United States) Downing Gray (a)	75-77-76-79=307	+19	0
T54	(United States) Ed Tutwiler (a)	79-74-73-81=307	+19	0
T57	(United States) Dow Finsterwald	73-76-77-82=308	+20	1,125
T57	(United States) Dale Morey (a)	75-78-76-79=308	+20	0
T59	(United States) Bob Goalby	76-77-82-77=312	+24	1,125
T59	(United States) Bob Murphy (a)	76-77-81-78=312	+24	0
T61	(England) Jimmy Hitchcock	76-77-78-83=314	+26	1,125
T61	(Philippines) Luis Silverio (a)	77-76-77-84=314	+26	0
CUT	(United States) John Mark Hopkins (a)	74-80=154	+10	
CUT	(United States) Dave Marr	78-76=154	+10	
CUT	(United States) Byron Nelson (c)	76-78=154	+10	
CUT	(United States) James Vickers (a)	82-72=154	+10	
CUT	(United States) Bo Wininger	77-77=154	+10	
CUT	(England) Michael Bonallack (a)	79-76=155	+11	
CUT	(United States) Charles Coody	78-77=155	+11	
CUT	(England) Bernard Hunt	78-77=155	+11	
CUT	(United States) Bob McCallister	79-76=155	+11	
CUT	(Australia) Kel Nagle	78-77=155	+11	
CUT	(Wales) Dave Thomas	78-77=155	+11	
CUT	(United States) Art Wall Jr. (c)	75-80=155	+11	
CUT	(New Zealand) Bob Charles	78-78=156	+12	
CUT	(United States) Dave Eichelberger (a)	78-78=156	+12	
CUT	(France) Jean Garaïalde	77-79=156	+12	
CUT	(United States) Bunky Henry (a)	77-79=156	+12	
CUT	(United States) Rod Horn (a)	73-83=156	+12	
CUT	(United States) Herman Keiser (c)	78-78=156	+12	
CUT	(United States) Billy Joe Patton (a)	78-78=156	+12	
CUT	(United States) Johnny Pott	78-78=156	+12	
CUT	(United States) Deane Beman (a)	78-79=157	+13	
CUT	(United States) Bert Greene (a)	80-77=157	+13	
CUT	(United States) Mason Rudolph	81-76=157	+13	
CUT	(United States) Jerry Barber	78-80=158	+14	
CUT	(United States) Tommy Barnes Jr. (a)	76-82=158	+14	
CUT	(United States) Dick Mayer	82-76=158	+14	
CUT	(Scotland) George Will	80-78=158	+14	
CUT	(South Africa) Cobie Legrange	78-81=159	+15	
CUT	(England) Lionel Platts	80-79=159	+15	
CUT	(United States) Cesar Sanudo (a)	81-78=159	+15	
CUT	(England) Peter Alliss	76-84=160	+16	
CUT	(England) Rodney Foster (a)	82-79=161	+17	
CUT	(United States) Henry Picard (c)	78-83=161	+17	
CUT	(United States) Gene Sarazen (c)	82-80=162	+18	
CUT	(Japan) Tomoo Ishii	82-81=163	+19	
CUT	(United States) Richard Davies (a)	83-82=165	+21	
CUT	(United States) Harvie Ward (a)	81-84=165	+21	
WD	(England) Neil Coles	77-72-76=225	+9	
WD	(United States) Lionel Hebert	73-79-81=233	+17	
WD	(United States) Cary Middlecoff (c)	83	+11	
WD	(United States) Claude Harmon (c)	87	+15	

==== Scorecard ====
Hole	1	2	3	4	5	6	7	8	9	10	11	12	13	14	15	16	17	18
Par	4	5	4	3	4	3	4	5	4	4	4	3	5	4	5	3	4	4
(United States) Nicklaus	+1	E	E	+1	+1	+1	+2	+1	+1	+2	+2	+2	+2	+1	E	E	E	E
(United States) Jacobs	E	E	E	E	E	E	E	+1	+1	+2	+2	+2	+1	+1	E	E	E	E
(United States) Brewer	+2	+1	+1	+1	+1	E	E	E	−1	−1	−1	−1	−1	−1	−1	−1	−1	E
(United States) Palmer	+2	+2	+2	+2	+2	+2	+1	E	E	E	E	+1	E	+1	+1	+1	+1	+2
(United States) Sanders	+2	+2	+2	+2	+3	+3	+2	+2	+2	+3	+4	+4	+4	+3	+3	+3	+2	+2
(United States) January	+2	+1	E	+1	+2	+4	+4	+4	+4	+5	+5	+5	+5	+4	+3	+3	+4	+4
(Canada) Knudson	+5	+5	+4	+5	+4	+4	+4	+3	+3	+3	+3	+5	+4	+4	+3	+4	+4	+4
(United States) Hogan	+3	+3	+2	+2	+2	+2	+3	+3	+4	+4	+4	+5	+5	+6	+5	+5	+7	+7

Cumulative tournament scores, relative to par

Birdie	Bogey	Double bogey

=== Playoff ===
Monday, April 11, 1966

Place	Player	Score	To par	Money ($)
1	(United States) Jack Nicklaus	70	−2	20,000
2	(United States) Tommy Jacobs	72	E	12,300
3	(United States) Gay Brewer	78	+6	8,300

==== Scorecard ====
Hole	1	2	3	4	5	6	7	8	9	10	11	12	13	14	15	16	17	18
Par	4	5	4	3	4	3	4	5	4	4	4	3	5	4	5	3	4	4
(United States) Nicklaus	E	−1	−1	E	E	−1	−1	−2	−1	−1	−2	−1	−1	−1	−2	−2	−2	−2
(United States) Jacobs	−1	−1	−1	−1	−1	−1	−1	−2	−1	E	E	+1	+1	+1	E	E	E	E
(United States) Brewer	E	+1	+1	+1	+1	+1	+2	+2	+2	+2	+3	+5	+5	+5	+4	+3	+5	+6

Cumulative tournament scores, relative to par

Birdie	Bogey	Double bogey
