= 1965 Masters Tournament =

- Front cover of the 1965 Masters Guide

Tournament information
- Dates: April 8–11, 1965
- Location: Augusta, Georgia; 33.503°N 82.020°W
- Course: Augusta National Golf Club
- Organized by: Augusta National Golf Club
- Tour: PGA Tour

Statistics
- Par: 72
- Length: 6,980 yards (6,383 m)
- Field: 91 players, 49 after cut
- Cut: 148 (+4)
- Winner's share: $20,000

Champion
- (United States) Jack Nicklaus
- 271 (−17)

Location map
- Location in the United States Location in Georgia

The 1965 Masters Tournament was the 29th Masters Tournament, held April 8–11 at Augusta National Golf Club in Augusta, Georgia.

Jack Nicklaus, age 25, won the second of his six Masters titles with a score of 271 (−17), at the time a tournament record, three strokes better than Ben Hogan's 274 in 1953. It was equaled in 1976 by Raymond Floyd and surpassed in 1997 by Tiger Woods' 270 (−18). Nicklaus' winning margin of nine strokes also stood until 1997, when Woods was victorious by twelve strokes to win his first green jacket. It was the fourth of a record 18 major titles won by Nicklaus in his career.

The "Big Three" (Nicklaus, Arnold Palmer, and Gary Player) were tied for the lead after 36 holes at 138 (−6), but Nicklaus shot a 64 (−8) on Saturday to post a 202 (−14), a gain of five shots on Player and eight on Palmer. Nicklaus' round tied the course record set by Lloyd Mangrum in the first round in 1940; it was lowered to 63 by Nick Price in the third round in 1986.

Nicklaus totally over-powered the Augusta National course, hitting short-irons into most of the par four holes and mid-irons into many of the par five holes, especially during his record-tying third round 64. After the tournament was over, when asked about Nicklaus' performance that week Bobby Jones said, "He plays a game with which I am not familiar."

Byron Nelson, age 53, tied for fifteenth place, the last cut made at Augusta by the two-time champion.

Art Wall Jr. won the sixth Par 3 contest with a score of 20.

== Field ==
1. Masters champions

Jack Burke Jr. (4), Jimmy Demaret, Doug Ford (4), Ralph Guldahl, Claude Harmon, Ben Hogan (8), Herman Keiser, Cary Middlecoff (2), Byron Nelson, Jack Nicklaus (2,4,8,10), Arnold Palmer (2,3,8,9,10,11), Henry Picard, Gary Player (3,4,8), Gene Sarazen, Sam Snead, Art Wall Jr.

- Craig Wood did not play.

The following categories only apply to Americans

2. U.S. Open champions (last 10 years)

Tommy Bolt, Julius Boros (11), Billy Casper (8,9,11), Jack Fleck, Gene Littler (8,9,11), Dick Mayer, Ken Venturi (9,10)

3. The Open champions (last 10 years)

Tony Lema (8,11)

4. PGA champions (last 10 years)

Jerry Barber, Dow Finsterwald (8,9,11), Jay Hebert, Lionel Hebert, Bobby Nichols (9,10), Bob Rosburg (9)

5. U.S. Amateur and Amateur champions (last 10 years)

Deane Beman (6,a), William C. Campbell (7,a), Charles Coe (6,a), Richard Davies (6,a)

- Harvie Ward did not play. Other champions forfeited their exemptions by turning professional.

6. Members of the 1963 U.S. Walker Cup team

Robert W. Gardner (a), Downing Gray (a), Billy Joe Patton (a), Charlie Smith (7,a), Ed Updegraff (a)

- Labron Harris Jr. and R. H. Sikes forfeited their exemptions by turning professional.

7. 1964 U.S. Amateur quarter-finalists

Don Allen (a), Dave Eichelberger (a), Gene Ferrell (a), John Mark Hopkins (a), Dale Morey (a), Ed Tutwiler (a)

8. Top 24 players and ties from the 1964 Masters Tournament

Jim Ferrier, Al Geiberger (9), Paul Harney, Don January (9), Dave Marr, Billy Maxwell (11), Johnny Pott (9,11), Mason Rudolph (10), Dan Sikes, Mike Souchak, Bo Wininger (10)

9. Top 16 players and ties from the 1964 U.S. Open

George Bayer, Gay Brewer (10), Bill Collins, Terry Dill, Raymond Floyd, Ed Furgol, Tommy Jacobs

10. Top eight players and ties from 1964 PGA Championship

Tom Nieporte

11. Members of the U.S. 1963 Ryder Cup team

Bob Goalby, Dave Ragan

12. Two players selected for meritorious records on the fall part of the 1964 PGA Tour

Frank Beard, Jack McGowan

13. One player, either amateur or professional, not already qualified, selected by a ballot of ex-Masters champions

Wes Ellis

14. One professional, not already qualified, selected by a ballot of ex-U.S. Open champions

Tommy Aaron

15. One amateur, not already qualified, selected by a ballot of ex-U.S. Amateur champions

Bill Hyndman (a)

16. Two players, not already qualified, from a points list based on finishes in the winter part of the 1965 PGA Tour

Doug Sanders, Bert Weaver

17. Foreign invitations

Peter Butler (8), Bob Charles (3,9), Chen Ching-Po, Gary Cowan (a), Bruce Crampton (8,9), Bruce Devlin (8), Harold Henning, Bernard Hunt, Geoffrey Hunt, Tomoo Ishii, George Knudson, Cobie Legrange, Stan Leonard, Kel Nagle (3,8), Chi-Chi Rodríguez (8), Leopoldo Ruiz, Ramón Sota, Nick Weslock (a)

- Numbers in brackets indicate categories that the player would have qualified under had they been American.

== Round summaries ==
=== First round ===
Thursday, April 8, 1965

Place	Player	Score	To par
1	(South Africa) Gary Player	65	−7
T2	(United States) Tommy Aaron	67	−5
T2	(United States) Tony Lema	67	−5
T2	(United States) Jack Nicklaus	67	−5
T2	(United States) Dan Sikes	67	−5
6	(United States) Frank Beard	68	−4
T7	(United States) George Bayer	69	−3
T7	(United States) Tommy Bolt	69	−3
T7	(United States) Wes Ellis	69	−3
T7	(United States) Raymond Floyd	69	−3
T7	(United States) Doug Sanders	69	−3

=== Second round ===
Friday, April 9, 1965

Place	Player	Score	To par
T1	(United States) Jack Nicklaus	67-71=138	−6
T1	(United States) Arnold Palmer	70-68=138	−6
T1	(South Africa) Gary Player	65-73=138	−6
4	(United States) Dan Sikes	67-72=139	−5
5	(United States) Tony Lema	67-73=140	−4
T6	(United States) Tommy Aaron	67-74=141	−3
T6	(United States) Doug Sanders	69-72=141	−3
8	(United States) Bo Wininger	70-72=142	−2
9	(United States) George Bayer	69-74=143	−1
T10	(United States) Billy Casper	72-72=144	E
T10	(Australia) Bruce Crampton	72-72=144	E
T10	(United States) Byron Nelson	70-74=144	E
T10	(United States) Bobby Nichols	73-71=144	E
T10	(United States) Tom Nieporte	71-73=144	E
T10	(Spain) Ramón Sota	71-73=144	E

=== Third round ===
Saturday, April 10, 1965

Place	Player	Score	To par
1	(United States) Jack Nicklaus	67-71-64=202	−14
2	(South Africa) Gary Player	65-73-69=207	−9
T3	(United States) Arnold Palmer	70-68-72=210	−6
T3	(United States) Dan Sikes	67-72-71=210	−6
5	(United States) Mason Rudolph	70-75-66=211	−5
T6	(United States) Tommy Aaron	67-74-71=212	−4
T6	(United States) Gene Littler	71-74-67=212	−4
T8	(Canada) George Knudson	72-73-69=214	−2
T8	(Spain) Ramón Sota	71-73-70=214	−2
T10	(United States) Billy Casper	72-72-71=215	−1
T10	(United States) Doug Sanders	69-72-74=215	−1

==== Scorecard ====
Third round, ties course record 31-33=64 (−8)

Hole	1	2	3	4	5	6	7	8	9	10	11	12	13	14	15	16	17	18
Par	4	5	4	3	4	3	4	5	4	4	4	3	5	4	5	3	4	4
(United States) Nicklaus	E	−1	−1	−2	−2	−3	−4	−5	−5	−5	−5	−5	−6	−6	−7	−8	−8	−8

=== Final round ===
Sunday, April 11, 1965

==== Final leaderboard ====
Champion
Silver Cup winner (low amateur)
(a) = amateur
(c) = past champion

Top 10
Place	Player	Score	To par	Money (US$)
1	(United States) Jack Nicklaus (c)	67-71-64-69=271	−17	20,000
T2	(United States) Arnold Palmer (c)	70-68-72-70=280	−8	10,200
T2	(South Africa) Gary Player (c)	65-73-69-73=280	−8	10,200
4	(United States) Mason Rudolph	70-75-66-72=283	−5	6,200
5	(United States) Dan Sikes	67-72-71-75=285	−3	5,000
T6	(United States) Gene Littler	71-74-67-74=286	−2	3,800
T6	(Spain) Ramón Sota	71-73-70-72=286	−2	3,800
T8	(United States) Frank Beard	68-77-72-70=287	−1	2,400
T8	(United States) Tommy Bolt	69-78-69-71=287	−1	2,400
10	(Canada) George Knudson	72-73-69-74=288	E	1,800

Leaderboard below the top 10
Place	Player	Score	To par	Money ($)
T11	(United States) Tommy Aaron	67-74-71-77=289	+1	1,550
T11	(Australia) Bruce Crampton	72-72-74-71=289	+1	1,550
T11	(United States) Paul Harney	74-74-71-70=289	+1	1,550
T11	(United States) Doug Sanders	69-72-74-74=289	+1	1,550
T15	(United States) George Bayer	69-74-75-72=290	+2	1,300
T15	(Australia) Bruce Devlin	71-76-73-70=290	+2	1,300
T15	(United States) Wes Ellis	69-76-72-73=290	+2	1,300
T15	(United States) Tommy Jacobs	71-74-72-73=290	+2	1,300
T15	(Australia) Kel Nagle	75-70-74-71=290	+2	1,300
T15	(United States) Byron Nelson (c)	70-74-72-74=290	+2	1,300
T21	(United States) Dow Finsterwald	72-75-72-72=291	+3	1,200
T21	(United States) Ben Hogan (c)	71-75-71-74=291	+3	1,200
T21	(United States) Tony Lema	67-73-77-74=291	+3	1,200
T24	(United States) Terry Dill	72-73-75-72=292	+4	1,200
T24	(United States) Al Geiberger	75-72-74-71=292	+4	1,200
T26	(England) Bernard Hunt	71-74-74-74=293	+5	1,075
T26	(Japan) Tomoo Ishii	74-74-70-75=293	+5	1,075
T26	(United States) Billy Maxwell	74-72-76-71=293	+5	1,075
T26	(United States) Tom Nieporte	71-73-75-74=293	+5	1,075
T26	(United States) Bo Wininger	70-72-75-76=293	+5	1,075
T31	(United States) Doug Ford (c)	74-74-73-73=294	+6	1,050
T31	(United States) Downing Gray (a)	72-74-73-75=294	+6	0
T31	(United States) Dave Ragan	73-74-73-74=294	+6	1,050
T31	(United States) Bert Weaver	72-75-72-75=294	+6	1,050
T35	(United States) Billy Casper	72-72-71-80=295	+7	1,050
T35	(United States) Jimmy Demaret (c)	71-75-76-73=295	+7	1,050
T35	(United States) Bobby Nichols	73-71-75-76=295	+7	1,050
T35	(United States) Mike Souchak	74-74-72-75=295	+7	1,050
T39	(United States) Don Allen (a)	70-77-74-75=296	+8	0
T39	(Chinese Taipei) Chen Ching-Po	71-77-77-71=296	+8	1,025
T39	(United States) Bob Goalby	71-75-75-75=296	+8	1,025
T42	(United States) Bill Hyndman (a)	73-73-75-76=297	+9	0
T42	(United States) Jack McGowan	73-75-77-72=297	+9	1,025
T42	(United States) Johnny Pott	74-74-73-76=297	+9	1,025
T45	(New Zealand) Bob Charles	72-74-76-77=299	+11	1,025
T45	(United States) Art Wall Jr. (c)	71-76-77-75=299	+11	1,025
47	(United States) Richard Davies (a)	70-78-78-76=302	+14	0
48	(United States) John Mark Hopkins (a)	70-78-78-77=303	+15	0
49	(United States) Deane Beman (a)	74-72-79-79=304	+16	0
CUT	(United States) Charles Coe (a)	73-76=149	+5	
CUT	(Argentina) Leopoldo Ruiz	76-73=149	+5	
CUT	(United States) Sam Snead (c)	75-74=149	+5	
CUT	(United States) Ed Tutwiler (a)	76-73=149	+5	
CUT	(United States) Jerry Barber	71-79=150	+6	
CUT	(United States) Julius Boros	73-77=150	+6	
CUT	(United States) Lionel Hebert	70-80=150	+6	
CUT	(United States) Don January	72-78=150	+6	
CUT	(South Africa) Harold Henning	72-79=151	+7	
CUT	(United States) Cary Middlecoff (c)	76-75=151	+7	
CUT	(Puerto Rico) Chi-Chi Rodríguez	75-76=151	+7	
CUT	(United States) Jack Burke Jr. (c)	75-77=152	+8	
CUT	(England) Peter Butler	76-76=152	+8	
CUT	(United States) Bill Collins	74-78=152	+8	
CUT	(United States) Raymond Floyd	69-83=152	+8	
CUT	(United States) Ed Furgol	72-80=152	+8	
CUT	(United States) Jay Hebert	75-77=152	+8	
CUT	(South Africa) Cobie Legrange	76-76=152	+8	
CUT	(United States) Claude Harmon (c)	74-79=153	+9	
CUT	(United States) Dave Marr	75-78=153	+9	
CUT	(United States) Dick Mayer	76-77=153	+9	
CUT	(United States) Billy Joe Patton (a)	70-83=153	+9	
CUT	(United States) Charlie Smith (a)	73-80=153	+9	
CUT	(Canada) Gary Cowan (a)	75-79=154	+10	
CUT	(United States) Jim Ferrier	74-80=154	+10	
CUT	(United States) Robert W. Gardner (a)	76-78=154	+10	
CUT	(United States) Gene Sarazen (c)	78-76=154	+10	
CUT	(United States) Gay Brewer	77-78=155	+11	
CUT	(Canada) Stan Leonard	71-84=155	+11	
CUT	(United States) Henry Picard (c)	76-79=155	+11	
CUT	(United States) Dale Morey (a)	74-82=156	+12	
CUT	(United States) Bob Rosburg	76-80=156	+12	
CUT	(Canada) Nick Weslock (a)	80-76=156	+12	
CUT	(United States) Dave Eichelberger (a)	74-83=157	+13	
CUT	(England) Geoffrey Hunt	80-77=157	+13	
CUT	(United States) Ken Venturi	77-80=157	+13	
CUT	(United States) William C. Campbell (a)	81-77=158	+14	
CUT	(United States) Ralph Guldahl (c)	83-85=168	+24	
WD	(United States) Herman Keiser (c)	80	+8	
WD	(United States) Ed Updegraff (a)			
DQ	(United States) Gene Ferrell (a)	78	+6	
DQ	(United States) Jack Fleck	79	+7	

==== Scorecard ====
Hole	1	2	3	4	5	6	7	8	9	10	11	12	13	14	15	16	17	18
Par	4	5	4	3	4	3	4	5	4	4	4	3	5	4	5	3	4	4
(United States) Nicklaus	−15	−15	−15	−16	−15	−15	−15	−15	−15	−15	−15	−16	−16	−16	−16	−16	−17	−17
(United States) Palmer	−6	−6	−6	−6	−5	−5	−5	−6	−7	−7	−7	−7	−8	−8	−8	−8	−8	−8
(South Africa) Player	−9	−10	−9	−8	−7	−8	−8	−9	−9	−9	−8	−6	−7	−7	−8	−8	−8	−8
(United States) Rudolph	−5	−5	−4	−4	−4	−4	−4	−4	−5	−5	−5	−5	−5	−4	−4	−5	−5	−5
(United States) Sikes	−6	−6	−6	−5	−5	−5	−5	−6	−6	−5	−5	−4	−2	−2	−3	−3	−3	−3

Cumulative tournament scores, relative to par

Birdie	Bogey	Double bogey
