= Shell's Wonderful World of Golf =

American television series

- Genre: Golf

Original release
- Release: 1960

Shell's Wonderful World of Golf was a televised series of golf matches which began in the 1960s. The program was sponsored by Shell Oil. It was a part of the tradition of "challenge matches" between pairs of professional golfers, which were the earliest form of professional golf competition, but have now been almost entirely replaced by large field tournaments. On a few occasions, three players competed (see table). No matches were staged between 1970 and 1994, when the show was restarted by Jack Nicklaus Productions and hosted by Gary Player. Gene Sarazen was the host for most of the earlier matches.

Each contest was played as a stroke play match, rather than match play.

It began as a pre-recorded one-hour program on Sunday afternoons, and was notable for also including information about the host country for that week's show. It also included some of the conversations between the contestants between the shots. As such, it allowed the audience to feel they were part of a foursome traveling with the competitors and host, as opposed to being just a spectator in the gallery.

In December 2025, Sports Business Journal reported that the PGA Tour and Pro Shop Holdings were working on a reboot of the series, the tour having filed to trademark the name "Wonderful World of Golf". It was not clear if Shell would be involved in the rebooted series.

== Matches through 2003 ==
Year	Players	Location	Course
2003	Fred Couples vs. Michael Campbell	Matauri Bay, Northland, New Zealand	Kauri Cliffs
2002	Gary Player vs. Tom Weiskopf	Galena, Ohio	Double Eagle Club
2002	Phil Mickelson vs. David Toms	Brooksville, Florida	Cabot Citrus Farms
2002	Fred Couples vs. Mark Calcavecchia	Carmel, California	The Preserve Golf Club
2001	Sam Torrance vs. Curtis Strange	Newport, Rhode Island	Carnegie Abbey Club
2001	Phil Mickelson vs. Sergio García	Los Cabos, Mexico	Querencia
2001	Craig Stadler vs. Shigeki Maruyama	Ichihara, Chiba, Japan	TPC Ichihara
2001	Karrie Webb vs. Annika Sörenstam	Las Vegas, Nevada	Las Vegas Paiute Golf Resort
2001	Jack Nicklaus vs. Arnold Palmer	St. Augustine, Florida	World Golf Village, The King and The Bear Course
2001	Jack Nicklaus vs. Ben Crenshaw	Santa Fe, New Mexico	Las Campanas
2000	David Duval vs Ernie Els	Charleston, South Carolina	Cherokee Plantation
2000	Notah Begay III vs Hal Sutton	Rose Hall, St. James, Jamaica	White Witch Golf Course
2000	Paul Azinger vs Jesper Parnevik	Gulfport, Mississippi	Grand Bear Golf Course
2000	Fred Couples vs Phil Mickelson	Oklahoma City, Oklahoma	Gaillardia Country Club
2000	Jack Nicklaus vs Gary Player	Berkshire, England	Sunningdale Golf Club (New Course)
1999	Nick Price vs Ernie Els	Malalane, Mpumalanga, South Africa	Leopard Creek Country Club
1999	Jim Furyk vs Colin Montgomerie	Paris, France	Paris Golf Club
1999	Dottie Pepper vs Karrie Webb	Hanover, Ohio	Longaberger Golf Club
1999	Fred Couples vs John Daly	Sunriver, Oregon	Crosswater Club
1999	Hale Irwin vs Tom Watson	Princeton, New Jersey	TPC Jasna Polana
1998	Tom Lehman vs. Phil Mickelson	Bay Harbor, Michigan	Bay Harbor Golf Club
1998	Fred Couples vs. Ernie Els	Whistler, British Columbia, Canada	Nicklaus North Golf Course
1998	Payne Stewart vs. Nick Price	Aruba	Tierra Del Sol Golf Course
1998	Justin Leonard vs. Davis Love III	Mamaroneck, New York	Winged Foot Golf Club (East Course)
1998	Gary Player vs. Lee Trevino	St. Augustine, Florida	World Golf Village
1997	Tom Lehman vs. Nick Faldo	Saint James, Barbados	Royal Westmoreland Golf Club
1997	Tom Kite vs. Seve Ballesteros	Santander, Cantabria, Spain	Real Club de Golf de Pedreña
1997	Fred Couples vs. Tom Watson	Thomastown, County Kilkenny, Ireland	Mount Juliet Golf Course
1997	Phil Mickelson vs. Colin Montgomerie	Vail, Colorado	Cordillera
1997	Jack Nicklaus vs. Johnny Miller	San Francisco, California	Olympic Club (Lakeside Course)
1996	Arnold Palmer vs. Gary Player	Lanai, Hawaii	The Challenge at Manele
1996	Jack Nicklaus vs. Lee Trevino	Cabo San Lucas, Mexico	Cabo del Sol (Ocean Course)
1996	Annika Sörenstam vs. Dottie Pepper	Kiawah Island, South Carolina	Kiawah Island (Ocean Course)
1996	Greg Norman vs. Fred Couples	Sutherland, Scotland	Skibo Castle
1996	Tom Kite vs. Ben Crenshaw	Houston, Texas	Champions Golf Club
1995	Greg Norman vs. Nick Price	Hobe Sound, Florida	Medalist Golf Club
1995	Jack Nicklaus vs. Tom Watson	Pebble Beach, California	Pebble Beach
1995	Chi-Chi Rodríguez vs. Lee Trevino	Humacao, Puerto Rico	Palmas del Mar (Palms Course)
1995	Phil Mickelson vs. Ernie Els	Tenerife, Spain	Golf del Sur
1995	Paul Azinger vs. Seve Ballesteros	St Andrews, Scotland	Old Course at St Andrews
1994	Raymond Floyd vs. Fred Couples	La Romana, Dominican Republic	Casa de Campo (Teeth of the Dog)
1994	Arnold Palmer vs. Jack Nicklaus	Pinehurst, North Carolina	Pinehurst No. 2
1994	Greg Norman vs. Nick Faldo	Berkshire, England	Sunningdale Golf Club (Old Course)
1970	Christy O'Connor vs. Bob Goalby	Ballybunion, Ireland	Ballybunion Golf Club, Old Course
1970	Roberto De Vicenzo vs. Tom Weiskopf vs. Dave Stockton	Buenos Aires, Argentina	Ranelagh Golf Club
1970	Bob Murphy vs. Dan Sikes vs. Miller Barber	Mount Irvine, Tobago, Trinidad and Tobago	Tobago Golf Club
1970	Lee Elder vs. George Knudson vs. George Archer	São Paulo, Brazil	São Fernando Golf Club
1970	Julius Boros vs. Frank Beard vs. Lee Trevino	Atizapan de Zaragoza, Mexico	Club de Golf Bellavista
1970	George Knudson vs. Roberto De Vicenzo	Winnipeg, Manitoba, Canada	St. Charles Country Club
1970	Frank Beard vs. Dan Sikes	New Orleans, Louisiana	New Orleans Country Club
1970	Dan Sikes vs. Roberto De Vicenzo	San Francisco, California	Olympic Club (Lakeside Course)
1969	Ben Arda vs. Billy Casper vs. Gene Littler	Manila, Philippines	Manila Golf & Country Club
1969	Arnold Palmer vs. Gay Brewer vs. Chi-Chi Rodríguez	Fajardo, Puerto Rico	El Conquistador Hotel & Club
1969	Roberto De Vicenzo vs. Bert Yancey vs. Tony Jacklin	Karen, Kenya	Karen Country Club
1969	Doug Sanders vs. Charlie Sifford vs. Dave Thomas	Singapore	Singapore Island Country Club
1969	Dan Sikes vs. Al Geiberger vs. Peter Alliss	Kamuela, Hawaii	Mauna Kea Beach Hotel Golf Course
1969	Frank Beard vs. Gardner Dickinson vs. Julius Boros	Kingston, Jamaica	Caymanas Golf & Country Club
1969	Frank Beard vs. Doug Sanders vs. Arnold Palmer	Palm Beach, Florida	PGA National Golf Club (East Course)
1969	Ben Arda vs. Roberto De Vicenzo vs. Dan Sikes	London, Ontario, Canada	London Hunt & Country Club
1969	Frank Beard vs. Ben Arda	Medinah, Illinois	Medinah Country Club (#3 Course)
1969	Sandra Haynie vs. Carol Mann vs. Kathy Whitworth	Bangkok, Thailand	Royal Bangkok Sports Club
1968	Mason Rudolph vs. Gardner Dickinson	Guatemala City, Guatemala	Guatemala Country Club
1968	Phil Rodgers vs. Dave Thomas	St Andrews, Scotland	Old Course at St Andrews
1968	Frank Beard vs. Sebastián Miguel	Barcelona, Spain	Real Club de Golf El Prat
1968	Don January vs. Christy O'Connor	Newcastle, County Down, Northern Ireland	Royal County Down Golf Club
1968	Julius Boros vs. Arnold Palmer	Eleuthera, The Bahamas	Cotton Bay Club
1968	Doug Sanders vs. Peter Alliss	Portimão, Portugal	Penina Golf Club
1968	Sandra Haynie vs. Carol Mann	Lausanne, Switzerland	Golf Club de Lausanne
1968	Billy Casper vs. Gay Brewer	Miami, Florida	Doral Country Club (Blue Course)
1968	Al Geiberger vs. George Knudson	Victoria, British Columbia, Canada	Victoria Golf Club
1968	Roberto De Vicenzo vs. Sam Snead	Bethesda, Maryland	Congressional Country Club
1967	Bruce Devlin vs. Tommy Jacobs	Rome, Italy	Golf Club of Rome
1967	Peter Alliss vs. Tony Lema	Tucker's Town, Bermuda	Mid Ocean Club
1967	Antonio Cerdá vs. Johnny Pott	Mexico City, Mexico	Club de Golf Mexico
1967	Peter Thomson vs. Dave Marr	Utrecht, Netherlands	Utrechtse Golf Club "De Pan"
1967	Marlene Streit (a) vs. Mickey Wright	Mississauga, Ontario, Canada	Toronto Golf Club
1967	Miguel Sala vs. Billy Casper	Caracas, Venezuela	Lagunita Country Club
1967	Jean Garaïalde vs. Ken Venturi	Versailles, France	Golf de la Boulie
1967	Julius Boros vs. Sam Snead	Atlanta, Georgia	Peachtree Golf Club
1967	Dave Thomas vs. Bob Rosburg	Mid-Glamorgan, Wales	Southerndown Golf Club
1967	Harold Henning vs. Doug Sanders	Frankfurt, Germany	Frankfurter Golf Club
1967	Roberto De Vicenzo vs. Tom Weiskopf	Fédala, Morocco	Golf de Fédala
1966	Tony Lema vs. Roberto De Vicenzo	Glyfada, Athens, Greece	Glyfada Golf Club
1966	Mike Souchak vs. Chi-Chi Rodríguez	Panama	Panama Country Club
1966	Marlene Streit (a) vs. Marilynn Smith	Oslo, Norway	Oslo Golfklubb
1966	Billy Casper vs. Doug Sanders	Brookline, Massachusetts	The Country Club
1966	Bruce Devlin vs. Charlie Sifford	Malaysia	Selangor G.C.
1966	Gene Littler vs. George Knudson	Aylmer, Quebec, Canada	Royal Ottawa Golf Club
1966	Ramón Sota vs. Bobby Nichols	Madrid, Spain	Real Club de Campo
1966	Sam Snead vs. Jimmy Demaret	Colorado Springs, Colorado	Air Force Academy
1966	George Will vs. Dave Marr	South Ayrshire, Scotland	Turnberry (Ailsa Course)
1966	Ben Arda vs. Dow Finsterwald	Philippines	Valley C.C.
1966	Chen Ching-Po vs. Tommy Jacobs	Osaka, Japan	Iberaki C.C.
1965	Dave Marr vs. Bernard Hunt	Berkshire, England	Sunningdale Golf Club (Old Course)
1965	Tony Lema vs. Carl Poulsen	Denmark	Rungsted Golf Klub
1965	Jay Hebert vs. Friedel Schmaderer	Hamburg, Germany	Hamburg G.C.
1965	Chi-Chi Rodríguez vs. Tommy Jacobs	Nassau, Bahamas	Lyford Cay Club
1965	Ben Hogan vs. Sam Snead	Houston, Texas	Houston C.C.
1965	George Knudson vs. Al Balding	Ingonish, Nova Scotia, Canada	Cape Breton Highlands
1964	Joe Carr (a) vs. Al Geiberger	Killarney, Ireland	Killarney Golf & Fishing Club
1965	Johnny Pott vs. Roberto De Vicenzo	Maracaibo, Venezuela	Maracaibo C.C.
1965	Phil Rodgers vs. Alfonso Angelini	Italy	Villa d'Este G.C.
1965	Marley Spearman vs. Marilynn Smith	Luxembourg	Luxembourg G.C.
1965	Barbara Romack vs. Isa Goldschmid	La Turbie, France	Monte Carlo G.C.
1964	Julius Boros vs. Miguel Sala	Bogotá, Colombia	Country Club de Bogotá
1964	Mickey Wright vs. Brigitte Varangot (a)	Portugal	Estoril G.C.
1964	Dave Marr vs. Flory Van Donck	Belgium	Royal Golf Course
1964	George Knudson vs. Stan Leonard	West Vancouver, British Columbia	Capilano G&CC
1964	Tony Lema vs. Chen Ching-Po	Japan	Kawana
1964	Doug Sanders vs. Chi-Chi Rodríguez	Puerto Rico	Dorado Beach (East Course)
1964	Bobby Nichols vs. Jacky Bonvin	Switzerland	GC Crans-Sur-Sierre
1964	Dave Ragan vs. Bob Charles	Hawaii	Royal Kaanapali Golf Course
1964	Johnny Pott vs. Kel Nagle	Delhi, India	Delhi Golf Club
1963	Dow Finsterwald vs. Peter Alliss	Jamaica	Tryall Hotel G.C.
1963	Gene Littler vs. Eric Brown	Auchterarder, Perth and Kinross, Scotland	Gleneagles (Kings Course)
1962	Dave Ragan vs. Celestino Tugot	Manila, Philippines	Wack Wack Golf and Country Club
1963	Art Wall Jr. vs. Stan Leonard	Boischatel, Quebec, Canada	Royal-Quebec Golf Club
1963	Doug Sanders vs. Arne Werkell	Sweden	Halmstad GK
1963	Jack Nicklaus vs. Sam Snead	Pebble Beach, California	Pebble Beach
1963	Byron Nelson vs. Gerard de Wit	The Hague, Netherlands	Royal Haagsche G&CC
1963	Phil Rodgers vs. Frank Phillips	Singapore	Royal Singapore G.C.
1963	Billy Casper vs. Harry Bradshaw	Portmarnock, Fingal, Ireland	Portmarnock Golf Club
1963	Bob Goalby vs. Bob Charles	New Zealand	Paraparaumu Beach
1963	Bob Rosburg vs. Roberto De Vicenzo	Chile	Los Leones
1962	Jerry Barber vs. Dai Rees	London, England	Wentworth (West Course)
1962	Jack Burke Jr. vs. Stan Leonard	Banff, Alberta, Canada	Banff Springs G.C.
1962	Gene Sarazen vs. Henry Cotton	St Andrews, Scotland	Old Course at St Andrews
1962	Bob Rosburg vs. Pete Nakamura	Kawagoe, Japan	Kasumigaseki Country Club
1962	Gene Littler vs. Byron Nelson	Pine Valley, New Jersey	Pine Valley Golf Club
1962	Ken Venturi vs. Ugo Grappasonni	Rome, Italy	Olgiata Golf Club
1962	Gary Player vs. Peter Thomson	Melbourne, Australia	Royal Melbourne Golf Club
1962	Mike Souchak vs. Roberto De Vicenzo	Buenos Aires, Argentina	Jockey Club (Red Course)
1962	Jay Hebert vs. Flory Van Donck	Paris, France	C. de G. St. Cloud
1962	Ted Kroll vs. Chen Ching-Po	Hong Kong	Royal Hong Kong Golf Club
1962	Billy Casper vs. Mário Gonzalez	Rio de Janeiro, Brazil	Gavea Country Club

- (a) denotes amateur
