= Al Barkow =

American journalist and writer (1932–2026)

Al Barkow (1932 – November 1, 2026) was an American journalist, author, editor, lecturer, historian and golfer.

== Early life and education ==
Barkow was born in Chicago, Illinois, in 1932. He attended Western Illinois University for three years, later graduating from Roosevelt University, Chicago, where he received a B.A. degree in 1960. Barkow was a member of the NAIA national championship college golf team (Western Illinois Univ., 1959); and qualified and competed in the U.S. Amateur (1971).

== Journalism ==
The main focus of Barkow's journalistic work has been as a golf writer, although Barkow has written on subjects beside golf - tennis, boxing, baseball - and on food. He has published hundreds of articles over a 46-year career in numerous leading publications. He has contributed hundreds of articles on golf, in magazines, newspapers, and more recently as an internet writer.

== Publications ==
Barkow made significant journalistic contributions to the following publications: The New York Times, Sports Illustrated, The Wall Street Journal, Golf Magazine, Golf Digest, Golf World, Sport, Senior Golfer, Golf Monthly (UK), USGA Golf Journal, Travel & Leisure, The Boston Globe Sunday Magazine, Signature, Diversion, Golf Journal, Links Magazine, The Majors Series, Golfiana, Golf Tips Magazine, The GolfWeb, IDV/Sports.

== Editor ==
Barkow was editor-in-chief of Golf Magazine (1970–72) and Golf Illustrated (1985–90; 1994–1996). He was later a contributing writer for Golf World. Barkow produced his own golf newsletter, Al Barkow's Golf Report (1991–92), and was the editor of The Journal of the Shivas Irons Society (2005–07).

== Author ==
Barkow's books included histories – Golf's Golden Grind: the History of the Tour (1974, reprinted 2000); Gettin' to the Dance Floor: an Oral History of American Golf (1986, reprinted 2000) The History of the PGA Tour (1989); The Golden Age of Golf: How America Came to Dominate the Old Scotsgame (2000); and Gene Sarazen and Shell's Wonderful World of Golf (2004). Gettin' to the Dance Floor was the winner of the inaugural USGA International Golf Book of the Year Award (1986). A collection of his articles entitled That's Golf: The Best of Barkow was published in 2002 by Burford Books. His biography of Sam Snead, entitled Sam, The One and Only Sam Snead, was first published in 2005, and in paperback in 2010. His current books include: "Golf's Firsts, Most, Leasts...and a Few Nevers" (2011), and "The Upset: Jack Fleck's Incredible Defeat of Ben Hogan for the U.S. Open" (2011).

== Golf instructional books ==
Barkow also wrote a number of golf instructional books in collaboration with golf professionals. They included: The Good Sense of Golf (with Billy Casper, 1980); The Venturi Analysis (with Ken Venturi, 1982); The Venturi System (with Ken Venturi, 1983); The Master of Putting (with George Low, 1983- Reprinted, 1997); Play Lower Handicap Golf (with Phil Rodgers, 1986); Getting Set for Golf (with Carl Lohren, 1995); Dave Stockton's Putting Secrets: The Final Word on Putting (with Dave Stockton), 2009.

== Television and radio ==
Barkow got his start in golf journalism in 1963, when he landed the job of golf writer on the Emmy Award-winning television program, Shell's Wonderful World of Golf television show. His first assignment was working on the famous "Hogan vs Snead" match at the Houston Country Club.

He became the chief writer and associate producer for the Shell's Wonderful World of Golf series from 1963 to 1969. Barkow eventually became a co-producer of the show.

Barkow worked as an on-camera commentator for "Inside the PGA Tour", and "The Senior PGA Tour" Shows (1986–1999). Barkow also worked as a "play-by-play" radio broadcaster and anchor of PGA, Senior PGA and LPGA Tour events for "Sportsband", and "One-on-One Sports" (1986–92); And, he contributed commentary on Sports Illustrated's Golf Plus radio broadcasts (1998).

== Death ==
Barkow died on November 1, 2026, at the age of 93.

== Awards ==
Barkow, a member of the Golf Writers Association of America (GWAA) from 1969, won writing awards given by the GWAA, second and third Place, GWAA magazine division (1983–95); he was also awarded the 2003 Journalism Honoree at the Memorial Tournament; 2004 ING Non-Fiction book for Sarazen/Shell's Wonderful World of Golf; 2005 PGA of America Lifetime Achievement-Journalism; 2007 Linc Werden/Metropolitan Golf Writers Assohociation (NY) Golf Journalism Award; and the USGA's International Golf Book of the Year award in 1986 for Gettin' to the Dance Floor, an Oral History of American Golf.
