= Mobile Sertoma Open Invitational =

Golf tournament formerly on the PGA Tour

Tournament information
- Location: Mobile, Alabama
- Established: 1959
- Course: Mobile Municipal Golf Course
- Par: 72
- Tour: PGA Tour
- Format: Stroke play
- Prize fund: US$11,500
- Month played: November
- Final year: 1962

Tournament record score
- Aggregate: 273 Tony Lema (1962)
- To par: −15 as above

Final champion
- (United States) Tony Lema
- Location in the United States Location in Alabama

The Mobile Sertoma Open Invitational was a PGA Tour event that was played at the Mobile Municipal Golf Course in Mobile, Alabama in the late 1950s and the early 1960s. Today, the course is known as Azalea City Golf Course.

== Winners ==
Year	Winner	Score	To par	Margin of victory	Runner(s)-up
1962	(United States) Tony Lema	273	−15	7 strokes	(United States) Doug Sanders
1961	(United States) Gay Brewer	275	−13	1 stroke	(United States) Johnny Pott
1960	(United States) Arnold Palmer	274	−14	2 strokes	(United States) Johnny Pott
1959	(United States) Billy Casper	280	−8	2 strokes	(United States) Wes Ellis (United States) Dave Ragan
