= Paddy Skerritt =

Irish professional golfer

Personal information
- Full name: Patrick Joseph Skerritt
- Nationality: Ireland
- Born: 29 May 1926 Lahinch, County Clare
- Died: 21 November 2001 (aged 75)

Career
- Sport: Golf
- Status: Professional
- Former tours: European Tour; European Seniors Tour
- Professional wins: 9

Best results in major championships
- Masters Tournament: DNP
- PGA Championship: DNP
- U.S. Open: DNP
- The Open Championship: T18: 1968

Patrick Joseph Skerritt (29 May 1926 – 21 November 2001) was an Irish professional golfer.

== Early life ==
Skerritt was born in Lahinch, County Clare.

== Professional career ==
Skerritt won many tournaments during his career, most of them in his home country, with his biggest success being the 1970 Alcan International. He was also the club professional for over 30 years at St. Anne's Golf Club, situated on Bull Island in Dublin Bay.

== Professional wins ==
- 1967 Southern Ireland Championship
- 1968 Southern Ireland Championship
- 1970 Southern Ireland Championship, Carroll's Irish Match Play Championship, Alcan International
- 1973 Kerrygold Championship
- 1977 Irish PGA Championship
- 1978 PGA Seniors Championship
- 1980 PGA Seniors Championship

== Results in major championships ==
Tournament	1967	1968	1969	1970	1971	1972	1973	1974	1975	1976	1977	1978
The Open Championship	CUT	T18	CUT				CUT					CUT

Note: Skerritt only played in The Open Championship.

Did not play

CUT = missed the half-way cut (3rd round cut in 1969 Open Championship)
"T" = tied

== Team appearances ==
- R.T.V. International Trophy (representing Ireland): 1967
- Double Diamond International (representing Ireland): 1971
