= Waco Turner Open =

Golf tournament

Tournament information
- Location: Burneyville, Oklahoma
- Established: 1961
- Course: Turner's Lodge
- Par: 72
- Tour: PGA Tour
- Format: Stroke play
- Prize fund: US$20,000
- Month played: April/May
- Final year: 1964

Tournament record score
- Aggregate: 276 Johnny Pott (1962)
- To par: −16 as above

Final champion
- (United States) Pete Brown

Location map
- Location in the United States Location in Oklahoma

The Waco Turner Open was a PGA Tour event that was played in Burneyville, Oklahoma in the early 1960s.

The founder of the tournament, Waco Turner, was a millionaire Oklahoma oilman with a passion for golf. He started Turner's Lodge, a golf resort on what he hoped would flourish into a 2,700-acre (11 km^{2}) grand development of 3,000 homes with a hotel, restaurants, tennis courts, swimming pools and an airstrip built around three lakes. The project ran into financial difficulties and the PGA left after the 1964 event.

The greatest claim to fame for the tournament is that in 1964 an African American golfer, Pete Brown, won an official PGA Tour event for the first time at this event.

The development, now called Falconhead Resort, has changed hands repeatedly in the ensuing decades, and only about 400 homes have been built on the 3,000 home sites.

== Winners ==
Year	Winner	Score	To par	Margin of victory	Runner-up
1964	(United States) Pete Brown	280	−8	1 stroke	(United States) Dan Sikes
1963	(United States) Gay Brewer	280	−12	1 stroke	(Australia) Ted Ball
1962	(United States) Johnny Pott	276	−16	6 strokes	(United States) Mason Rudolph
1961	(United States) Butch Baird	281	−7	1 stroke	(United States) Rex Baxter
