= Alcan Open =

Golf tournament

Alcan Golfer of the Year Championship
Tournament information
- Location: Dublin, Ireland
- Established: 1967
- Course: Portmarnock Golf Club
- Par: 72
- Tour: PGA Tour
- Format: Stroke play
- Prize fund: £15,000
- Final year: 1970

Tournament record score
- Aggregate: 274 Billy Casper (1969)
- To par: −14 as above

Final champion
- (Australia) Bruce Devlin (Republic of Ireland) Paddy Skerritt

Location map
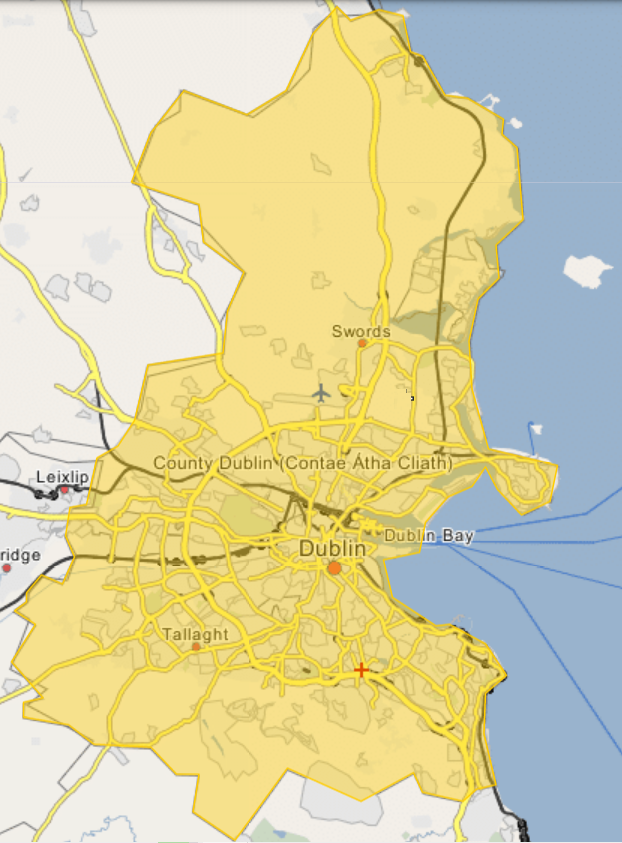
- Location in Ireland Location in County Dublin

The Alcan Golfer of the Year Championship, also known as the Alcan Open, was an international golf tournament played from 1967 to 1970. It was sponsored by Alcan Aluminum of Canada, a long-time corporate sponsor of professional golf on international circuits. A concurrent Alcan International tournament was also played. The 1969 tournament, played in the United States, was an official PGA Tour event.

== Tournament hosts ==
- 1967 Old Course at St Andrews, St Andrews, Scotland
- 1968 Royal Birkdale Golf Club, Southport, England
- 1969 Portland Golf Club, Portland, Oregon, United States
- 1970 Portmarnock Golf Club, Portmarnock, Ireland

== Winners ==
=== Alcan Open ===
Year	Tour (Note: PGAT − PGA Tour.)	Winner	Score	To par	Margin of victory	Runner-up	Ref.
Alcan Golfer of the Year Championship
1970		(Australia) Bruce Devlin	278	−10	7 strokes	(United States) Bob Rosburg	
Alcan Open
1969	PGAT	(United States) Billy Casper	274	−14	1 stroke	(United States) Lee Trevino	
Alcan Golfer of the Year Championship
1968		(United States) Gay Brewer (2)	283	−9	3 strokes	(England) Peter Townsend	
1967		(United States) Gay Brewer	283	−5	Playoff	(United States) Billy Casper	

=== Alcan International ===
Year	Winner	Score	To par	Margin of victory	Runner(s)-up	Ref.
1970	(Republic of Ireland) Paddy Skerritt	286	−2	3 strokes	(England) Maurice Bembridge (Scotland) Eric Brown	
1969: No tournament
1968	(England) Bill Large (Republic of Ireland) Christy O'Connor Snr	288	−4	Title shared		
1967	(Australia) Peter Thomson	281	−7	5 strokes	(England) Tony Grubb	
