= Pete Brown (golfer) =

American professional golfer (1935–2015)

Personal information
- Nationality: United States
- Born: February 2, 1935 Port Gibson, Mississippi, U.S.
- Died: May 1, 2015 (aged 80) Augusta, Georgia, U.S.
- Height: 6 ft 1 in (1.85 m)
- Weight: 190 lb (86 kg; 14 st)

Career
- Sport: Golf
- Status: Professional
- Former tours: PGA Tour; Champions Tour
- Professional wins: 14

Number of wins by tour
- PGA Tour: 2
- Other: 12

Best results in major championships
- Masters Tournament: DNP
- PGA Championship: T33: 1964
- U.S. Open: T58: 1969
- The Open Championship: DNP

Pete Brown (February 2, 1935 – May 1, 2015) was an American professional golfer who was the first African American to win a PGA Tour event with his win at the Waco Turner Open. He was from Mississippi.

== Early life ==
Brown was born in Port Gibson, Mississippi, and grew up in Jackson, Mississippi. He started in golf as a caddy at the municipal course in his hometown. He suffered from non-paralytic polio in the late 1950s but recovered and resumed playing competitive golf.

== Career ==
He turned professional in 1954, winning the Negro National Open consecutively in 1961 and 1962. Brown received his PGA Tour card in 1963. He was not the first African American to obtain his PGA players card; that honor belonged to Charlie Sifford. Brown's victory at the 1964 Waco Turner Open did, however, earn him a place in history as the first African American to win a PGA event. He played on the PGA Tour for 17 years and posted a second tour win at the 1970 Andy Williams-San Diego Open Invitational in a playoff over Tony Jacklin.

Brown played on the Senior PGA Tour (now Champions Tour) beginning in 1985. His best finishes were a pair of T-6s in 1985 at the Senior PGA Tour Roundup and the MONY Syracuse Senior Classic.

Brown was inducted into the Mississippi Sports Hall of Fame in 2020.

== Personal life ==
Brown and his wife, Margaret, are the parents of six daughters. He was the head pro at Madden Golf Course in Dayton, Ohio, for more than 20 years. He lived in Evans, Georgia, from 2012 to 2015.

Brown died in Augusta, Georgia, on May 1, 2015, at the age of 80.

== Professional wins (14) ==
=== PGA Tour wins (2) ===
No.	Date	Tournament	Winning score	Margin of victory	Runner-up
1	May 3, 1964	Waco Turner Open	−8 (71-71-68-70=280)	1 stroke	(United States) Dan Sikes
2	Feb 1, 1970	Andy Williams-San Diego Open Invitational	−13 (76-67-67-65=275)	Playoff	(England) Tony Jacklin

PGA Tour playoff record (1–1)

No.	Year	Tournament	Opponent(s)	Result
1	1964	Almaden Open Invitational	(United States) Billy Casper, (United States) Jerry Steelsmith	Casper won with birdie on third extra hole after 18 hole playoff; Casper: −4 (68), Brown: −4 (68), Steelsmith: +1 (73)
2	1970	Andy Williams-San Diego Open Invitational	(England) Tony Jacklin	Won with par on first extra hole

=== Other wins (12) ===
- Four time USG (Negro) National Open Champion
- Four time Long Star Open Champion
- Three time North & South Champion
- 1962 Michigan Open
