= Rives McBee =

American professional golfer (1938–2023)

Personal information
- Nationality: United States
- Born: October 31, 1938 Denton, Texas, U.S.
- Died: October 4, 2023 (aged 84) Dallas, Texas, U.S.

Career
- Sport: Golf
- Status: Professional
- Former tours: PGA Tour; Senior PGA Tour
- Professional wins: 4

Number of wins by tour
- PGA Tour Champions: 3
- Other: 1

Rives McBee (pronounced "Reeves") (October 31, 1938 – October 4, 2023) was an American professional golfer who played on the PGA Tour and the Senior PGA Tour.

== Early life and amateur career ==
In 1938, McBee was born in Denton, Texas.

As an amateur he qualified for the 1966 U.S. Open at Olympic Club. He "startled the golf world" when he tied the U.S. Open record with a 65. He eventually finished T-13. It was his best performance at a major championship.

== Professional career ==
McBee played on the PGA Tour from 1966 to 1971, before accepting a job as the head golf professional at Las Colinas Country Club in Irving. He was a founding member of the Northern Texas Junior Golf Association, and a former Northern Texas PGA Teacher of the Year. McBee won the club pro's national title in 1973.

McBee competed on the Senior PGA Tour from 1989 to 1997, winning three times.

== Personal life ==
McBee lived in Irving, Texas for most of his life.

McBee died in Dallas on October 4, 2023, at the age of 84.

== Professional wins (4) ==
=== Regular career wins (1) ===
- 1973 PGA Club Professional Championship

=== Senior PGA Tour wins (3) ===
No.	Date	Tournament	Winning score	Margin of victory	Runner(s)-up
1	Sep 3, 1989	RJR Bank One Classic	−8 (68-65-69=202)	2 strokes	(South Africa) Harold Henning
2	Aug 19, 1990	Showdown Classic	−14 (64-70-68=202)	1 stroke	(United States) Don Bies, (United States) Lee Trevino
3	Sep 9, 1990	Vantage Bank One Classic	−15 (66-67-68=201)	4 strokes	(United States) Mike Hill

== U.S. national team appearances ==
- Diamondhead Cup/PGA Cup: 1973 (winners), 1974 (winners), 1976 (winners), 1978

== See also ==
- 1966 PGA Tour Qualifying School graduates
