= 1965 U.S. Open (golf) =

Coordinates: 38.66°N 90.483°W

Tournament information
- Dates: June 17–21, 1965
- Location: Town and Country, Missouri
- Course: Bellerive Country Club
- Organized by: USGA
- Tour: PGA Tour

Statistics
- Par: 70
- Length: 7,191 yards (6,575 m)
- Field: 150 players, 51 after cut
- Cut: 150 (+10)
- Prize fund: $123,890
- Winner's share: $26,000

Champion
- (South Africa) Gary Player
- 282 (+2), playoff

Location in the United States
Location in Missouri

The 1965 U.S. Open was the 65th U.S. Open, held June 17–21 at Bellerive Country Club in Town and Country, Missouri, a suburb west of St. Louis. Gary Player of South Africa defeated Kel Nagle of Australia in an 18-hole playoff to win his only U.S. Open title. Player was the first foreign-born winner of the U.S. Open since 1927, and the win completed his career Grand Slam at age 29. It was the fourth of his nine major titles. The 1965 U.S. Open was the first U.S. Open broadcast on color television.

The five-year-old course at Bellerive was the U.S. Open's longest to date at 7,191 yards (6,575 m), and had the potential to reach 7,500 yards (6,860 m). The quality of the young course's turf varied, with burned out or diseased areas which the USGA did not allow relief from. The field consisted of 136 professionals and 14 amateurs, with the top fifty and ties advancing after 36 holes. This was the first time that the U.S. Open was scheduled for four days, with the final round on Sunday. Previously the third and fourth rounds were both played on Saturday. The U.S. Women's Open also changed to this format, held two weeks later in early July.

== Course layout ==
Hole	1	2	3	4	5	6	7	8	9	Out	10	11	12	13	14	15	16	17	18	In	Total
Yards	435	446	164	470	465	195	401	580	416	3,562	460	373	460	198	405	456	218	606	453	3,629	7,191
Par	4	4	3	4	4	3	4	5	4	35	4	4	4	3	4	4	3	5	4	35	70

== Final round and playoff ==
In the final round on Sunday, Player owned a three-stroke lead over Nagle with just three holes to play. But while Player double-bogeyed the par-3 16th hole, Nagle birdied the 17th. As Player reached the 18th tee, he knew he needed a birdie to win outright, as Nagle had parred the final hole for 282 (+2). Player had a 28-foot (8.5 m) putt for birdie, but left it 4 inches (10 cm) short and tapped in for a 72-hole tie. In the 18-hole playoff on Monday afternoon, Player built a five-shot lead after eight holes and held on to win by three strokes, 71 to 74. He won the championship with fiberglass-shafted golf clubs.

With his win, Player joined Gene Sarazen and Ben Hogan as the only to win all four professional major championships, the career Grand Slam. Jack Nicklaus completed the feat himself the next year at the 1966 British Open. Player was also the first foreign-born winner of the U.S. Open in 38 years, since Scotland's Tommy Armour won in 1927.

Arnold Palmer missed the 36-hole cut by two strokes, the only time from 1962 to 1967 that he placed outside the top-5 at the U.S. Open. Defending champion Ken Venturi was hampered by numbed fingers and missed the cut by ten strokes.

== Purse donated ==
The winner's share was $25,000 and both playoff participants received a $1,000 bonus, taken from the gate receipts of the Monday gallery of 6,790. Player donated his winner's share to cancer research ($5,000) and junior golf ($20,000) in the United States, fulfilling an earlier pledge to thank the people of America; his mother died of cancer when he was eight years old. Player paid his caddy $2,000 with his playoff bonus and $1,000 from his pocket.

== Round summaries ==
=== First round ===
Thursday, June 17, 1965

Place	Player	Score	To par
1	(Australia) Kel Nagle	68	−2
T2	(United States) Deane Beman (a)	69	−1
T2	(United States) Mason Rudolph	69	−1
T4	(United States) Rex Baxter	70	E
T4	(United States) Lou Graham	70	E
T4	(South Africa) Gary Player	70	E
7	(United States) Gordon Jones	71	+1
T8	(United States) Miller Barber	72	+2
T8	(United States) Julius Boros	72	+2
T8	(United States) Gay Brewer	72	+2
T8	(Australia) Bruce Devlin	72	+2
T8	(United States) Raymond Floyd	72	+2
T8	(United States) Ron Howell	72	+2
T8	(United States) Steve Opperman	72	+2
T8	(United States) Dudley Wysong	72	+2

=== Second round ===
Friday, June 18, 1965

Place	Player	Score	To par
1	(South Africa) Gary Player	70-70=140	E
T2	(Australia) Kel Nagle	68-73=141	+1
T2	(United States) Mason Rudolph	69-72=141	+1
4	(United States) Deane Beman (a)	69-73=142	+2
5	(United States) Frank Beard	74-69=143	+3
T6	(United States) Raymond Floyd	72-72=144	+3
T6	(United States) Gene Littler	73-71=144	+3
T8	(United States) Rex Baxter	70-75=145	+5
T8	(Australia) Bruce Devlin	72-73=145	+5
T8	(United States) Gordon Jones	71-74=145	+5

=== Third round ===
Saturday, June 19, 1965

Place	Player	Score	To par
1	(South Africa) Gary Player	70-70-71=211	+1
T2	(United States) Frank Beard	74-69-70=213	+3
T2	(Australia) Kel Nagle	68-73-72=213	+3
4	(United States) Mason Rudolph	69-72-73=214	+4
5	(United States) Al Geiberger	70-76-70=216	+6
T6	(United States) Julius Boros	72-75-70=217	+7
T6	(United States) Gay Brewer	72-74-71=217	+7
T6	(Australia) Bruce Devlin	72-73-72=217	+7
T6	(United States) Gene Littler	73-71-73=217	+7
T6	(United States) Dudley Wysong	72-75-70=217	+7

=== Final round ===
Sunday, June 20, 1965

Place	Player	Score	To par	Money ($)
T1	(South Africa) Gary Player	70-70-71-71=282	+2	Playoff
T1	(Australia) Kel Nagle	68-73-72-69=282	+2	Playoff
3	(United States) Frank Beard	74-69-70-71=284	+4	9,000
T4	(United States) Julius Boros	72-75-70-70=287	+7	6,500
T4	(United States) Al Geiberger	70-76-70-71=287	+7	6,500
T6	(Australia) Bruce Devlin	72-73-72-71=288	+8	4,500
T6	(United States) Raymond Floyd	72-72-76-68=288	+8	4,500
T8	(United States) Tony Lema	72-74-73-70=289	+9	2,500
T8	(United States) Gene Littler	73-71-73-72=289	+9	2,500
T8	(United States) Dudley Wysong	72-75-70-72=289	+9	2,500

==== Scorecard ====
Hole	1	2	3	4	5	6	7	8	9	10	11	12	13	14	15	16	17	18
Par	4	4	3	4	4	3	4	5	4	4	4	4	3	4	4	3	5	4
(South Africa) Player	+1	+1	+1	+1	+1	+1	E	E	E	+1	+1	E	E	E	E	+2	+2	+2
(Australia) Nagle	+3	+2	+2	+3	+3	+3	+3	+3	+3	+2	+2	+1	+1	+1	+3	+3	+2	+2

Cumulative tournament scores, relative to par

Birdie	Bogey	Double bogey

=== Playoff ===
Monday, June 21, 1965

Place	Player	Score	To par	Money ($)
1	(South Africa) Gary Player	33-38=71	+1	26,000
2	(Australia) Kel Nagle	38-36=74	+4	13,500

- Included in earnings is a playoff bonus of $1,000 each, from the playoff gate receipts.

==== Scorecard ====
Hole	1	2	3	4	5	6	7	8	9	10	11	12	13	14	15	16	17	18
Par	4	4	3	4	4	3	4	5	4	4	4	4	3	4	4	3	5	4
(South Africa) Player	E	−1	−2	−1	−1	−1	−1	−2	−2	−1	−1	−1	−1	−1	−1	−1	E	+1
(Australia) Nagle	+1	E	E	E	+2	+2	+3	+3	+3	+4	+4	+4	+4	+4	+4	+4	+4	+4

Birdie	Bogey	Double bogey
