= Bank One Classic =

The Bank One Classic was a golf tournament on the Champions Tour from 1983 to 1997. It was played in Lexington, Kentucky at the Griffin Gate Golf Club (1983–1989) and at the Kearney Hill Links (1990–1997).

The purse for the 1997 tournament was US$800,000, with $120,000 going to the winner. The tournament was founded in 1983 as the Citizens Union Senior Golf Classic.

== Winners ==
Bank One Classic

- 1997 Vicente Fernández
- 1996 Mike Hill
- 1995 Gary Player

Bank One Senior Classic

- 1994 Isao Aoki
- 1993 Gary Player
- 1992 Terry Dill
- 1991 DeWitt Weaver

Vantage Bank One Classic

- 1990 Rives McBee

RJR Bank One Classic

- 1989 Rives McBee

Bank One Senior Golf Classic

- 1988 Bob Charles
- 1987 Bruce Crampton

Bank One Senior Golf Classic

- 1986 Gene Littler

Citizens Union Senior Golf Classic

- 1985 Lee Elder
- 1984 Gay Brewer
- 1983 Don January
