= 1964 U.S. Open (golf) =

Coordinates: 38.966°N 77.1765°W

Tournament information
- Dates: June 18–20, 1964
- Location: Bethesda, Maryland
- Course(s): Congressional Country Club; Blue Course
- Organized by: USGA
- Tour: PGA Tour

Statistics
- Par: 70
- Length: 7,053 yards (6,449 m)
- Field: 150 players, 55 after cut
- Cut: 150 (+10)
- Winner's share: $17,000

Champion
- (United States) Ken Venturi
- 278 (−2)

Location in the United States
Location in Maryland

The 1964 U.S. Open was the 64th U.S. Open, held June 18–20 at the Blue Course of Congressional Country Club in Bethesda, Maryland, a suburb northwest of Washington, D.C. Ken Venturi won his only major title, four strokes ahead of runner-up Tommy Jacobs.

Jacobs held the 36-hole lead after shooting a 64 (−6) in the second round, tying the U.S. Open record at the time for a round, set by Lee Mackey in 1950. In the third round on Saturday morning, he carded an even-par 70 and retained the lead after 54 holes, two strokes ahead of Venturi, who made up four shots with a 66 (−4). Masters champion Arnold Palmer had led after the first round, but hopes of a grand slam faded with a 75 in the third.

Before the final round began on Saturday afternoon, Venturi was advised by doctors to withdraw from the tournament. He was suffering dehydration due to an oppressive heat wave and had to take treatments with tea and salt tablets in between rounds. To play the final round, doctors warned, was to risk heat stroke. Venturi, however, ignored the advice and played on, then shot a 70 to Jacobs' 76 to claim a four-stroke victory. Venturi's score of 206 over the final 54 holes set a new U.S. Open record, as did his score of 136 over the last 36. The win was his first on tour in four years.

Future champion Raymond Floyd made his U.S. Open debut this year at age 21 and finished in 14th place. He played the final two rounds on Saturday with Venturi. This was the last time the championship was scheduled for three days (the final two rounds scheduled on Saturday); the next year it was expanded to four days, concluding on Sunday.

The Blue Course at Congressional was the longest in U.S. Open history to date, at 7,053 yards (6,449 m). A lack of rainfall in the previous six weeks reduced its effective length, and it played firm and fast.

== Course layout ==
Hole	1	2	3	4	5	6	7	8	9	Out	10	11	12	13	14	15	16	17	18	In	Total
Yards	405	195	459	423	408	456	168	362	599	3,475	459	399	188	448	434	564	211	410	465	3,578	7,053
Par	4	3	4	4	4	4	3	4	5	35	4	4	3	4	4	5	3	4	4	35	70

== Round summaries ==
=== First round ===
Thursday, June 18, 1964

Place	Player	Score	To par
1	(United States) Arnold Palmer	68	−2
2	(United States) Bill Collins	70	E
T3	(United States) William Campbell (a)	71	+1
T3	(United States) Billy Casper	71	+1
T3	(United States) Tony Lema	71	+1
T3	(United States) Johnny Pott	71	+1
T3	(United States) Joe Zakarian	71	+1
T8	(New Zealand) Bob Charles	72	+2
T8	(Australia) Bruce Crampton	72	+2
T8	(United States) Richard Crawford	72	+2
T8	(United States) Ed Furgol	72	+2
T8	(United States) Labron Harris	72	+2
T8	(United States) Tommy Jacobs	72	+2
T8	(United States) Billy Martindale	72	+2
T8	(United States) Stan Mosel	72	+2
T8	(United States) Bobby Nichols	72	+2
T8	(United States) Jack Nicklaus	72	+2
T8	(Canada) Bob Panasiuk	72	+2
T8	(United States) Paul Scodeller	72	+2
T8	(United States) Charlie Sifford	72	+2
T8	(United States) Ken Venturi	72	+2

=== Second round ===
Friday, June 19, 1964

Place	Player	Score	To par
1	(United States) Tommy Jacobs	72-64=136	−4
2	(United States) Arnold Palmer	68-69=137	−3
3	(United States) Bill Collins	70-71=141	+1
T4	(United States) Charlie Sifford	72-70=142	+2
T4	(United States) Ken Venturi	72-70=142	+2
T6	(Australia) Bruce Crampton	72-71=143	+3
T6	(United States) Raymond Floyd	73-70=143	+3
T6	(United States) Tony Lema	71-72=143	+3
T9	(United States) William Campbell (a)	71-73=144	+4
T9	(New Zealand) Bob Charles	72-72=144	+4
T9	(United States) Al Geiberger	74-70=144	+4
T9	(United States) Gene Littler	73-71=144	+4
T9	(United States) Bobby Nichols	72-72=144	+4
T9	(United States) Johnny Pott	71-73=144	+4

=== Third round ===
Saturday, June 20, 1964 (morning)

Place	Player	Score	To par
1	(United States) Tommy Jacobs	72-64-70=206	−4
2	(United States) Ken Venturi	72-70-66=208	−2
3	(United States) Arnold Palmer	68-69-75=212	+2
4	(United States) Billy Casper	71-74-69=214	+4
T5	(New Zealand) Bob Charles	72-72-71=215	+5
T5	(United States) Bill Collins	70-71-74=215	+5
T5	(United States) Raymond Floyd	73-70-72=215	+5
T8	(United States) Dow Finsterwald	73-72-71=216	+6
T8	(United States) Bob Rosburg	73-73-70=216	+6
10	(United States) Johnny Pott	71-73-73=217	+7

=== Final round ===
Saturday, June 20, 1964 (afternoon)

Place	Player	Score	To par	Money ($)
1	(United States) Ken Venturi	72-70-66-70=278	−2	17,000
2	(United States) Tommy Jacobs	72-64-70-76=282	+2	8,500
3	(New Zealand) Bob Charles	72-72-71-68=283	+3	6,000
4	(United States) Billy Casper	71-74-69-71=285	+5	5,000
T5	(United States) Gay Brewer	76-69-73-68=286	+6	3,750
T5	(United States) Arnold Palmer	68-69-75-74=286	+6	3,750
7	(United States) Bill Collins	70-71-74-72=287	+7	3,000
8	(United States) Dow Finsterwald	73-72-71-72=288	+8	2,500
T9	(United States) Johnny Pott	71-73-73-72=289	+9	1,950
T9	(United States) Bob Rosburg	73-73-70-73=289	+9	1,950

==== Scorecard ====
Final round

Hole	1	2	3	4	5	6	7	8	9	10	11	12	13	14	15	16	17	18
Par	4	3	4	4	4	4	3	4	5	4	4	3	4	4	5	3	4	4
(United States) Venturi	−2	−2	−2	−2	−2	−1	−1	−1	−2	−2	−2	−2	−3	−2	−2	−2	−2	−2
(United States) Jacobs	−4	−2	−2	−1	−1	−1	−1	−1	E	+1	E	E	+1	+2	+3	+2	+2	+2
(United States) Palmer	+1	+1	+1	+2	+2	+3	+3	+2	+2	+2	+2	+2	+3	+4	+4	+5	+6	+6

Cumulative tournament scores, relative to par

Birdie	Bogey	Double bogey

== Video ==
- USGA: 1964 U.S. Open win by Venturi
