= Gay Brewer =

American professional golfer (1932–2007)

Personal information
- Full name: Gay Robert Brewer Jr.
- Born: March 19, 1932 Middletown, Ohio, U.S.
- Died: August 31, 2007 (aged 75) Lexington, Kentucky, U.S.
- Height: 6 ft 0 in (1.83 m)
- Weight: 185 lb (84 kg; 13.2 st)
- Children: 2

Career
- Sport: Golf
- Turned professional: 1956
- Former tours: PGA Tour; Champions Tour
- Professional wins: 17

Number of wins by tour
- PGA Tour: 10
- PGA Tour Champions: 1
- Other: 5 (regular); 1 (senior)

Best results in major championships (wins: 1)
- Masters Tournament: Won: 1967
- PGA Championship: T7: 1972
- U.S. Open: 5th/T5: 1962, 1964
- The Open Championship: T6: 1968

Gay Robert Brewer Jr. (March 19, 1932 – August 31, 2007) was an American professional golfer who played on the PGA Tour and won the 1967 Masters Tournament.

== Career ==
Brewer turned professional in 1956 and made his first cut, at the Agua Caliente Open, tying for 12th. His first top-10 as a pro came at the Philadelphia Daily News Open (tied for eighth), and his first top-five performance was at the Miller High Life Open in Milwaukee (tied for fifth). Playing on the PGA Tour in 1965, he won the Hawaiian Open. At the 1966 Masters Tournament, he bogeyed the final hole to finish in a three-way tie for the lead after regulation play but ended up finishing third to Jack Nicklaus following an 18-hole playoff. He came back to win the prestigious event the next year, scoring a one stroke victory over lifelong friend Bobby Nichols in the first live television broadcast of a golf tournament from the United States to Europe. Brewer called winning the 1967 Masters "the biggest thrill I've had in golf".

Overall, Brewer was victorious in 10 tour events during his career. He was known for his jovial personality and his unusual golf swing. Brewer joined the Senior PGA Tour and won the 1984 Liberty Mutual Legends of Golf tournament with Billy Casper and at age sixty-three he won the 1995 MasterCard Champions Championship. His final competitive round was at the 2001 Masters Tournament.

Brewer died at his home in Lexington, Kentucky from lung cancer. At the time of his death, he was engaged to Alma Jo McGuire.

== Amateur wins ==
This list may be incomplete.

- 1949 Kentucky State Boys, U.S. Junior Amateur
- 1950 Kentucky State Boys
- 1951 Kentucky State Boys
- 1952 Southern Amateur

== Professional wins (17) ==
=== PGA Tour wins (10) ===
Legend
Major championships (1)
Other PGA Tour (9)

No.	Date	Tournament	Winning score	Margin of victory	Runner(s)-up
1	Aug 20, 1961	Carling Open Invitational	−3 (72-72-66-67=277)	1 stroke	(United States) Billy Maxwell
2	Nov 26, 1961	Mobile Sertoma Open Invitational	−13 (69-66-74-66=275)	1 stroke	(United States) Johnny Pott
3	Dec 3, 1961	West Palm Beach Open Invitational	−14 (69-64-70-71=274)	4 strokes	(United States) Arnold Palmer
4	May 5, 1963	Waco Turner Open	−12 (72-70-71-67=280)	1 stroke	(Australia) Ted Ball
5	Sep 26, 1965	Greater Seattle Open Invitational	−9 (69-72-66-72=279)	Playoff	(United States) Doug Sanders
6	Nov 7, 1965	Hawaiian Open	−7 (74-72-67-68=281)	Playoff	(United States) Bob Goalby
7	Mar 7, 1966	Pensacola Open Invitational	−16 (65-69-67-71=272)	3 strokes	(Australia) Bruce Devlin
8	Mar 26, 1967	Pensacola Open Invitational (2)	−26 (66-64-61-71=262)	6 strokes	(United States) Bob Keller
9	Apr 9, 1967	Masters Tournament	−8 (73-68-72-67=280)	1 stroke	(United States) Bobby Nichols
10	Jul 9, 1972	Canadian Open	−9 (67-70-68-70=275)	1 stroke	(United States) Sam Adams, (United States) Dave Hill

PGA Tour playoff record (2–6)

No.	Year	Tournament	Opponent(s)	Result
1	1959	West Palm Beach Open Invitational	(United States) Pete Cooper, (United States) Arnold Palmer	Palmer won with par on fourth extra hole
2	1965	Greater Seattle Open Invitational	(United States) Doug Sanders	Won with par on first extra hole
3	1965	Hawaiian Open	(United States) Bob Goalby	Won with birdie on first extra hole
4	1966	Masters Tournament	(United States) Tommy Jacobs, (United States) Jack Nicklaus	Lost 18-hole playoff; Nicklaus: −2 (70), Jacobs: E (72), Brewer: +6 (78)
5	1966	Tournament of Champions	(United States) Arnold Palmer	Lost 18-hole playoff; Palmer: −3 (69), Brewer: +1 (73)
6	1969	IVB-Philadelphia Golf Classic	(United States) Dave Hill, (United States) Tommy Jacobs, (United States) R. H. Sikes	Hill won with birdie on first extra hole
7	1974	American Golf Classic	(United States) Jim Colbert, (United States) Forrest Fezler, (United States) Raymond Floyd	Colbert won with par on second extra hole Brewer and Fezler eliminated by par on first hole
8	1976	Walt Disney World National Team Championship (with (United States) Bobby Nichols)	(United States) Woody Blackburn and (United States) Billy Kratzert	Lost to birdie on third extra hole

=== Other wins (5) ===
This list is probably incomplete.

- 1951 Kentucky Open (as an amateur)
- 1965 PGA National Four-ball Championship (with Butch Baird)
- 1967 Alcan Golfer of the Year Championship
- 1968 Alcan Golfer of the Year Championship
- 1972 Taiheiyo Club Masters

=== Senior PGA Tour wins (1) ===
No.	Date	Tournament	Winning score	Margin of victory	Runners-up
1	Sep 3, 1984	Citizens Union Senior Golf Classic	−9 (68-69-67=204)	2 strokes	(United States) Billy Casper, (United States) Rod Funseth

=== Other senior wins (1) ===
This list is probably incomplete.

- 1984 Liberty Mutual Legends of Golf (with Billy Casper)

== Major championships ==
=== Wins (1) ===
Year	Championship	54 holes	Winning score	Margin	Runner-up
1967	Masters Tournament	2 shot deficit	−8 (73-68-72-67=280)	1 stroke	(United States) Bobby Nichols

=== Results timeline ===
Tournament	1956	1957	1958	1959
Masters Tournament				
U.S. Open	CUT	CUT	CUT	CUT
The Open Championship				
PGA Championship				

Tournament	1960	1961	1962	1963	1964	1965	1966	1967	1968	1969
Masters Tournament			T11	CUT	T25	CUT	3	1	T35	CUT
U.S. Open		CUT	5	CUT	T5	16	T36	T38	T9	CUT
The Open Championship								CUT	T6	15
PGA Championship			CUT	T49	8	T28	27	T28	T20	T25

Tournament	1970	1971	1972	1973	1974	1975	1976	1977	1978	1979
Masters Tournament	T31	CUT		T10	CUT	CUT	T23	CUT	T29	CUT
U.S. Open	7	T9	T25					26		
The Open Championship	T32			T10	T37					
PGA Championship	CUT		T7	T64	T17	T33				

Tournament	1980	1981	1982	1983	1984	1985	1986	1987	1988	1989
Masters Tournament	CUT	T15	45	47	CUT	CUT	CUT	CUT	CUT	WD
U.S. Open										
The Open Championship										
PGA Championship										

Tournament	1990	1991	1992	1993	1994	1995	1996	1997	1998	1999
Masters Tournament	CUT	CUT	CUT	CUT	CUT	CUT	CUT	CUT	CUT	WD
U.S. Open										
The Open Championship										
PGA Championship										

Tournament	2000	2001
Masters Tournament	CUT	WD
U.S. Open		
The Open Championship		
PGA Championship		

Win
Top 10
Did not play

CUT = missed the half-way cut
WD = withdrew
"T" = tied

=== Summary ===
Tournament	Wins	2nd	3rd	Top-5	Top-10	Top-25	Events	Cuts made
Masters Tournament	1	0	1	2	3	7	39	12
U.S. Open	0	0	0	2	5	7	17	10
The Open Championship	0	0	0	0	2	3	6	5
PGA Championship	0	0	0	0	2	5	13	11
Totals	1	0	1	4	12	22	75	38

- Most consecutive cuts made – 7 (1965 U.S. Open – 1967 U.S. Open)
- Longest streak of top-10s – 3 (1972 PGA – 1973 Open Championship)
