= Terry Dill =

American professional golfer (born 1939

Personal information
- Full name: Terrance Darby Dill
- Nationality: United States
- Born: May 13, 1939 (age 87) Fort Worth, Texas, U.S.
- Height: 6 ft 3 in (1.91 m)
- Weight: 195 lb (88 kg; 13.9 st)

Career
- Sport: Golf
- College: University of Texas
- Turned professional: 1962
- Former tours: PGA Tour; Champions Tour; European Seniors Tour
- Professional wins: 1

Number of wins by tour
- PGA Tour Champions: 1

Best results in major championships
- Masters Tournament: T17: 1966
- PGA Championship: T22: 1971
- U.S. Open: T14: 1964
- The Open Championship: T40: 1965

Terrance Darby Dill (born May 13, 1939) is an American professional golfer who has competed on the PGA Tour, Champions Tour, and most recently, the European Seniors Tour.

== Career ==
Dill won one tournament on the Senior PGA Tour, the 1992 Bank One Classic. He also won the par-3 contest at the Masters Tournament. In 2006, he ran as a Republican for a Texas state house seat, but was defeated in the primary as he finished 4th out of five candidates with 756 votes or 12.4%.

== Professional wins (1) ==
=== Senior PGA Tour wins (1) ===
No.	Date	Tournament	Winning score	Margin of victory	Runner-up
1	Sep 13, 1992	Bank One Classic	−13 (67-66-70=203)	1 stroke	(Australia) Bruce Crampton

Senior PGA Tour playoff record (0–1)

No.	Year	Tournament	Opponent	Result
1	1992	NYNEX Commemorative	(United States) Dale Douglass	Lost to par on first extra hole
