= Ken Venturi =

American golfer and broadcaster (1931–2013)

Personal information
- Full name: Kenneth Paul Venturi
- Nationality: United States
- Born: May 15, 1931 San Francisco, California, U.S.
- Died: May 17, 2013 (aged 82) Rancho Mirage, California, U.S.
- Height: 6 ft 0 in (183 cm)
- Weight: 170 lb (77 kg; 12 st)
- Spouses: Kathleen Venturi (m. 2003–2013, his death); Beau Wheat Venturi (m. 1972–1997, her death); Conni Venturi (m. 1954–1970, divorced)
- Children: Matthew, Tim

Career
- Sport: Golf
- College: San Jose State
- Turned professional: 1956
- Former tour: PGA Tour
- Professional wins: 15

Number of wins by tour
- PGA Tour: 14
- Other: 1

Best results in major championships (wins: 1)
- Masters Tournament: 2nd: 1956, 1960
- PGA Championship: T5: 1959, 1964
- U.S. Open: Won: 1964
- The Open Championship: CUT: 1973

Achievements and awards
- World Golf Hall of Fame: 2013 (member page)
- PGA Player of the Year: 1964
- Sports Illustrated Sportsman of the Year: 1964

Kenneth Paul Venturi (May 15, 1931 – May 17, 2013) was an American professional golfer and golf broadcaster. In a career shortened by injuries, he won 14 events on the PGA Tour including a major, the U.S. Open in 1964. Shortly before his death in 2013, Venturi was inducted into the World Golf Hall of Fame.

== Early life and amateur career ==
Born in San Francisco, California, Venturi learned to play golf at an early age, and developed his game at Harding Park Golf Course and other public courses in the Bay Area. He attended Lincoln High School and was the San Francisco high school golf champion in 1948 and 1949. Venturi also attended San José State University, where he was a member of the Spartan men's golf team from 1951 through 1953.

In the early 1950s, he was a pupil of Byron Nelson, and was also influenced by playing partner Ben Hogan. Venturi won the California State Amateur Championship in 1951 and 1956, serving in the U.S. Army in Korea and Europe in the interim.

Venturi first gained national attention at age 24; while still an amateur, he finished second in the Masters in 1956, one shot behind Jack Burke Jr., Venturi led after each of the first three rounds in an attempt to become the first-ever amateur to win the Masters, but shot a final round 80 and relinquished a four-shot lead. Through 2025, no amateur has won the Masters.

== Professional career ==
Venturi turned pro at the end of 1956 and was a regular winner during his early years on the PGA Tour. He again came close to winning the Masters in 1958 and 1960, but was edged out both times by Arnold Palmer. On January 24, 1960, Venturi won the Bing Crosby National Pro-Am on the 1960 PGA Tour.

After suffering minor injuries in an automobile accident in 1961, Venturi's swing, and thus his career, began to slide. This slump lasted until 1964 when, for no reason even Venturi could fathom, he began playing well again. After a couple of high finishes, Venturi reached the pinnacle of his comeback by winning the U.S. Open in 1964 at Congressional Country Club, after nearly collapsing in the near-100 °F (38 °C) heat and humidity of the 36-hole final day. (The format was changed the next year in 1965.) Venturi was the first player to win the U.S. Open after conquering a sectional qualifier.

Venturi won again in July and August, tied for fifth in the PGA Championship, and received that year's Sports Illustrated magazine's "Sportsman of the Year" award and PGA Player of the Year award. He played on the Ryder Cup team in 1965.

After 1964, Venturi's career again took a blow when he was diagnosed with carpal tunnel syndrome in both wrists. After missing the cut at the Masters by nine strokes, he received treatment at the Mayo Clinic in May. Defending his title at the U.S. Open in June, Venturi continued to have difficulty with his hands and entered the championship with plans to have surgery the following week. He missed the cut by ten strokes, had the surgery on both wrists, and was sidelined until the Ryder Cup in October in England. Venturi's condition improved and he won a tour event in January 1966 at the very familiar Harding Park in his hometown, but he soon relapsed; after additional surgeries, he could not regain his form.

=== Broadcasting career ===
After retiring from the Tour in 1967 with a total of 14 career wins, Venturi spent the next 35 years working as a color commentator and lead analyst for CBS Sports – the longest lead analyst stint in sports broadcasting history, made remarkable by the fact that he had a stutter, which was less manageable early in life. He retired from broadcasting at age 71 in June 2002, succeeded as CBS' lead analyst by Lanny Wadkins, then Nick Faldo in 2007.

In 1990, Venturi redesigned and renovated the Eagle Creek Golf & Country Club course near Naples, Florida. He also lent his name to a series of instructional schools.

== Awards and honors ==
- In 1998, he received the Old Tom Morris Award from the Golf Course Superintendents Association of America, GCSAA's highest honor.
- In 2004, after some controversy, a Golden Palm Star on the Palm Springs, California, Walk of Stars was dedicated to Venturi.
- In 2013, he was inducted into the World Golf Hall of Fame in the lifetime achievement category.

== In popular culture ==
- Venturi appeared in the 1996 film Tin Cup, portraying himself as a commentator at the U.S. Open, held at a fictional course in North Carolina. In one scene, Venturi is shown voicing his opinion that the film's protagonist, Roy McAvoy (Kevin Costner), should lay up on a long par-5 rather than try to reach the green in two shots. McAvoy, who decided to go for it, is then shown saying, "This is for Venturi up in the booth thinking I should lay up." His caddy, played by Cheech Marin, sarcastically responds, "Yeah, what does he know? He only won this tournament before you were born."

== Personal life ==
Venturi had two sons, Matthew and Tim and four adult grandchildren Peter, Andrew, Sara and Gianna.

Venturi described the actor and singer Frank Sinatra as his best friend and former roommate.

== Death ==
Venturi died on May 17, 2013, in Rancho Mirage, California at the age of 82. He had been hospitalized for two months for a spinal infection, pneumonia, and an intestinal infection. Venturi is survived by his third wife Kathleen, two sons, Matthew and Tim and four adult grandchildren Peter, Andrew, Sara and Gianna. He was buried at the Forest Lawn Cemetery in Cathedral City, California.

== Amateur wins (5) ==
- 1950 San Francisco City Amateur Championship
- 1951 California State Amateur Championship
- 1953 San Francisco City Amateur Championship
- 1956 California State Amateur Championship, San Francisco City Amateur Championship

== Professional wins (15) ==
=== PGA Tour wins (14) ===
Legend
Major championships (1)
Other PGA Tour (13)

No.	Date	Tournament	Winning score	To par	Margin of victory	Runner(s)-up
1	Aug 18, 1957	St. Paul Open Invitational	66-67-65-68=266	−22	2 strokes	(United States) Bob Rosburg
2	Aug 25, 1957	Miller High Life Open	68-66-65-68=267	−13	5 strokes	(Canada) Al Balding, (United States) Sam Snead
3	Jan 26, 1958	Thunderbird Invitational	70-63-66-70=269	−15	4 strokes	(United States) Jimmy Demaret, (United States) Gene Littler
4	Feb 2, 1958	Phoenix Open Invitational	70-68-66-70=274	−10	1 stroke	(United States) Walter Burkemo, (United States) Jay Hebert
5	Mar 2, 1958	Baton Rouge Open Invitational	69-69-69-69=276	−12	4 strokes	(United States) Lionel Hebert, (United States) Arnold Palmer
6	Aug 4, 1958	Gleneagles-Chicago Open Invitational	65-67-68-72=272	−8	1 stroke	(United States) Julius Boros, (United States) Jack Burke Jr.
7	Jan 5, 1959	Los Angeles Open	72-71-72-63=278	−6	2 strokes	(United States) Art Wall Jr.
8	Jun 28, 1959	Gleneagles-Chicago Open Invitational (2)	64-75-68-66=273	−7	1 stroke	(United States) Johnny Pott
9	Jan 24, 1960	Bing Crosby National Pro-Am	70-71-68-77=286	−2	3 strokes	(United States) Julius Boros, (United States) Tommy Jacobs
10	Aug 28, 1960	Milwaukee Open Invitational (2)	65-69-68-69=271	−9	2 strokes	(United States) Billy Casper
11	Jun 20, 1964	U.S. Open	72-70-66-70=278	−2	4 strokes	(United States) Tommy Jacobs
12	Jul 26, 1964	Insurance City Open Invitational	70-63-69-71=273	−11	1 stroke	(United States) Al Besselink, (United States) Paul Bondeson (United States) Sam Carmichael, (United States) Jim Grant
13	Aug 23, 1964	American Golf Classic	71-66-69-69=275	−5	5 strokes	(United States) Mason Rudolph
14	Jan 31, 1966	Lucky International Open	68-68-71-66=273	−11	1 stroke	(United States) Frank Beard

PGA Tour playoff record (0–3)

No.	Year	Tournament	Opponent(s)	Result
1	1957	Thunderbird Invitational	(United States) Jimmy Demaret, (United States) Mike Souchak	Demaret won 18-hole playoff; Demaret: −4 (67), Souchak: +4 (75), Venturi: +5 (76)
2	1958	Greater New Orleans Open Invitational	(United States) Billy Casper	Lost to eagle on second extra hole
3	1961	Houston Classic	(United States) Jay Hebert	Lost to birdie on first extra hole after 18 hole playoff; Hebert: −1 (69), Venturi: −1 (69)

=== Other wins (1) ===
- 1959 Almaden Open

== Major championships ==
=== Wins (1) ===
Year	Championship	54 holes	Winning score	Margin	Runner-up
1964	U.S. Open	2 shot deficit	−2 (72-70-66-70=278)	4 strokes	(United States) Tommy Jacobs

=== Results timeline ===
Amateur

Tournament	1953	1954	1955	1956
Masters Tournament		T16		2 LA
U.S. Open	CUT			8 LA
The Open Championship				
The Amateur Championship			R64	

Professional

Tournament	1957	1958	1959
Masters Tournament	T13	T4	CUT
U.S. Open	T6	T35	T38
The Open Championship			
PGA Championship		T20	T5

Tournament	1960	1961	1962	1963	1964	1965	1966	1967	1968	1969
Masters Tournament	2	T11	T9	34		CUT	16	T21	T50	CUT
U.S. Open	T23				1	CUT	T17	T28	CUT	CUT
The Open Championship										
PGA Championship	9	T37	T51		T5		T15	T11	T48	

Tournament	1970	1971	1972	1973	1974
Masters Tournament					
U.S. Open					CUT
The Open Championship				CUT	
PGA Championship					

Win
Top 10
Did not play

LA = Low amateur
CUT = missed the half-way cut
WD = withdrew
R64, R32, R16, QF, SF = Round in which player lost in match play
"T" = tied

Sources: Masters, U.S. Open, Open Championship, PGA Championship, 1955 British Amateur

=== Summary ===
Tournament	Wins	2nd	3rd	Top-5	Top-10	Top-25	Events	Cuts made
Masters Tournament	0	2	0	3	4	9	14	11
U.S. Open	1	0	0	1	3	5	13	8
The Open Championship	0	0	0	0	0	0	1	0
PGA Championship	0	0	0	2	3	6	9	9
Totals	1	2	0	6	10	20	37	28

- Most consecutive cuts made – 12 (1959 U.S. Open – 1964 PGA)
- Longest streak of top-10s – 2 (four times)

== U.S. national team appearances ==
Amateur

- Walker Cup: 1953 (winners)
- Americas Cup: 1952 (winners), 1956 (winners)

Professional

- Ryder Cup: 1965 (winners)
- Presidents Cup: 2000 Presidents Cup (winners, non-playing captain)
