= Billy Casper =

American professional golfer (1931–2015)

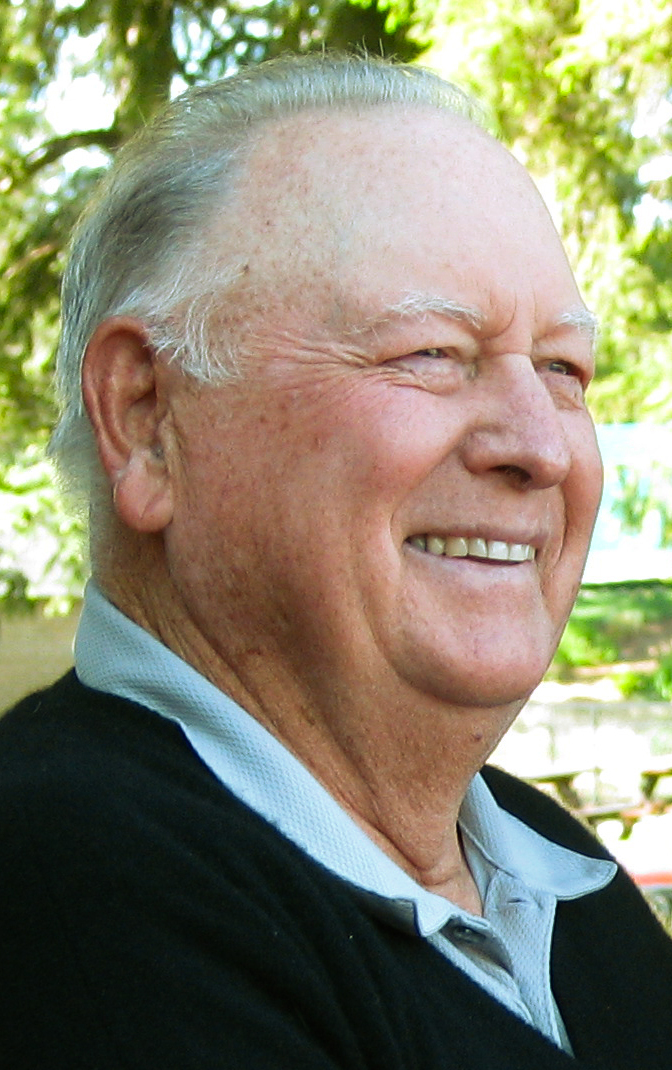
- Casper in 2008

Personal information
- Full name: William Earl Casper Jr.
- Nickname: Buffalo Bill
- Nationality: United States
- Born: June 24, 1931 San Diego, California, U.S.
- Died: February 7, 2015 (aged 83) Springville, Utah, U.S.
- Height: 5 ft 11 in (1.80 m)
- Weight: 195 lb (88 kg; 13.9 st)
- Spouse: Shirley Franklin (m. 1952)
- Children: 11

Career
- Sport: Golf
- College: University of Notre Dame
- Turned professional: 1954
- Former tours: PGA Tour; Champions Tour
- Professional wins: 72

Number of wins by tour
- PGA Tour: 51 (7th all time)
- European Tour: 1
- PGA Tour Champions: 9
- Other: 10 (regular); 1 (senior)

Best results in major championships (wins: 3)
- Masters Tournament: Won: 1970
- PGA Championship: 2nd/T2: 1958, 1965, 1971
- U.S. Open: Won: 1959, 1966
- The Open Championship: 4th: 1968

Achievements and awards
- World Golf Hall of Fame: 1978 (member page)
- Vardon Trophy: 1960, 1963, 1965, 1966, 1968
- PGA Tour money list winner: 1966, 1968
- PGA Player of the Year: 1966, 1970

William Earl Casper Jr. (June 24, 1931 – February 7, 2015) was an American professional golfer. He was one of the most prolific tournament winners on the PGA Tour from the mid-1950s to the mid-1970s.

In his youth, Casper started as a caddie and emerged from the junior golf hotbed of San Diego, where golf could be played year-round, to rank seventh all-time in career Tour wins with 51, across 20 years between 1956 and 1975. Fellow San Diegan great Gene Littler was a friend and rival from teenager to senior. Casper won three major championships, represented the United States on a then-record eight Ryder Cup teams, and holds the U.S. record for career Ryder Cup points won. After reaching age 50, Casper regularly played the Senior PGA Tour and was a winner there until 1989. In his later years, Casper successfully developed businesses in golf course design and management of golf facilities.

Casper served as Ryder Cup captain in 1979, was twice PGA Player of the Year (1966 and 1970), was twice the leading money winner, and won five Vardon Trophy awards for the lowest seasonal scoring average on the Tour.

Respected for his putting and short-game skill, Casper overcame his distance disadvantages against longer-hitting competitors such as Arnold Palmer and Jack Nicklaus with creative shot-making, and golf-course management abilities. Casper developed his style by relying on solid technique, determination, concentration, and perseverance.

He converted to the Church of Jesus Christ of Latter-day Saints in 1966. Casper was inducted into the World Golf Hall of Fame in 1978.

== Early life ==
Casper was born in San Diego, California. He grew up in Chula Vista, California. His father started him in golf at age five. Casper caddied during his youth at San Diego Country Club to earn money for golf.

== Amateur career ==
Casper spent one semester at the University of Notre Dame on a golf scholarship, after graduating from Chula Vista High School. He returned to San Diego to marry his wife Shirley in 1952. Casper competed frequently as an amateur against fellow San Diegan Gene Littler. After graduating from Notre Dame, he turned professional in 1954.

== Professional career ==
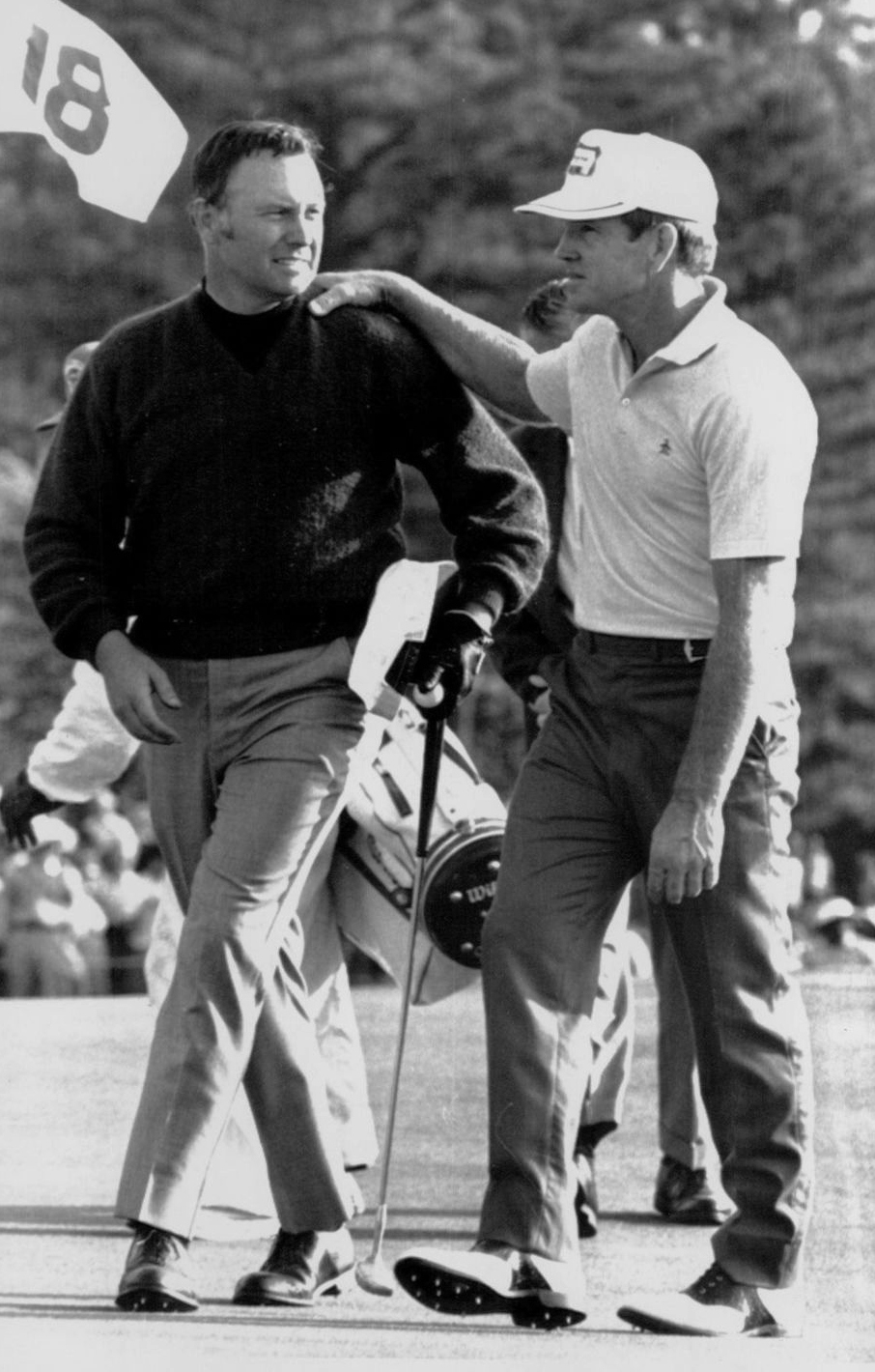
Gene Littler (right) congratulates Casper with winning the 1970 Masters Tournament

Casper had 51 PGA Tour wins in his career, with his first coming in 1956. This total places him seventh on the all-time list. His victories helped him finish third in McCormack's World Golf Rankings in 1968, 1969, and 1970, the first three years they were published. He won three major championships: the 1959 and 1966 U.S. Opens, and the 1970 Masters Tournament.

He was the PGA Tour Money Winner in 1966 and 1968. He was PGA Player of the Year in 1966 and 1970. Casper won the Vardon Trophy for lowest scoring average five times: 1960, 1963, 1965, 1966, and 1968.

Casper was a member of the United States team in the Ryder Cup eight times: 1961, 1963, 1965, 1967, 1969, 1971, 1973, 1975, and a non-playing captain in 1979. Casper has scored the most points in the Ryder Cup by an American player.

Casper won at least one PGA Tour event for 16 straight seasons, from 1956 to 1971, the third-longest streak, trailing only Arnold Palmer and Jack Nicklaus, who each won on Tour in 17 straight years.

On the senior circuit, Casper earned nine Senior PGA Tour (now the Champions Tour) wins from 1982 to 1989, including two senior majors.

== Legacy ==
Between 1964 and 1970, Casper won 27 tournaments on the PGA Tour, two more than Jack Nicklaus and six more than Arnold Palmer and Gary Player combined, during that period.

Casper’s PGA Tour victories spanned 20 years, from 1956 to 1975. His leading contemporaries included Arnold Palmer, Jack Nicklaus, Sam Snead, Cary Middlecoff, Gary Player and Lee Trevino.

Casper was inducted into the World Golf Hall of Fame in 1978. In 2000, he was ranked as the 15th greatest golfer of all time by Golf Digest magazine.

Casper's grandson, Mason Casper, played for the Utah Valley University golf team. Mason qualified for NCAA post-season play in 2012.

== Personal life ==
Casper was a member of the Church of Jesus Christ of Latter-day Saints, joining in early 1966 at age 34, at the height of his playing career.

Casper died at age 83 in 2015 of a heart attack at his home in Springville, Utah. He was survived by his wife of more than 60 years, Shirley Franklin Casper, 11 children, six of whom are adopted, 71 grandchildren and numerous great-grandchildren.

== Other ventures ==
=== Golf course design and management ===
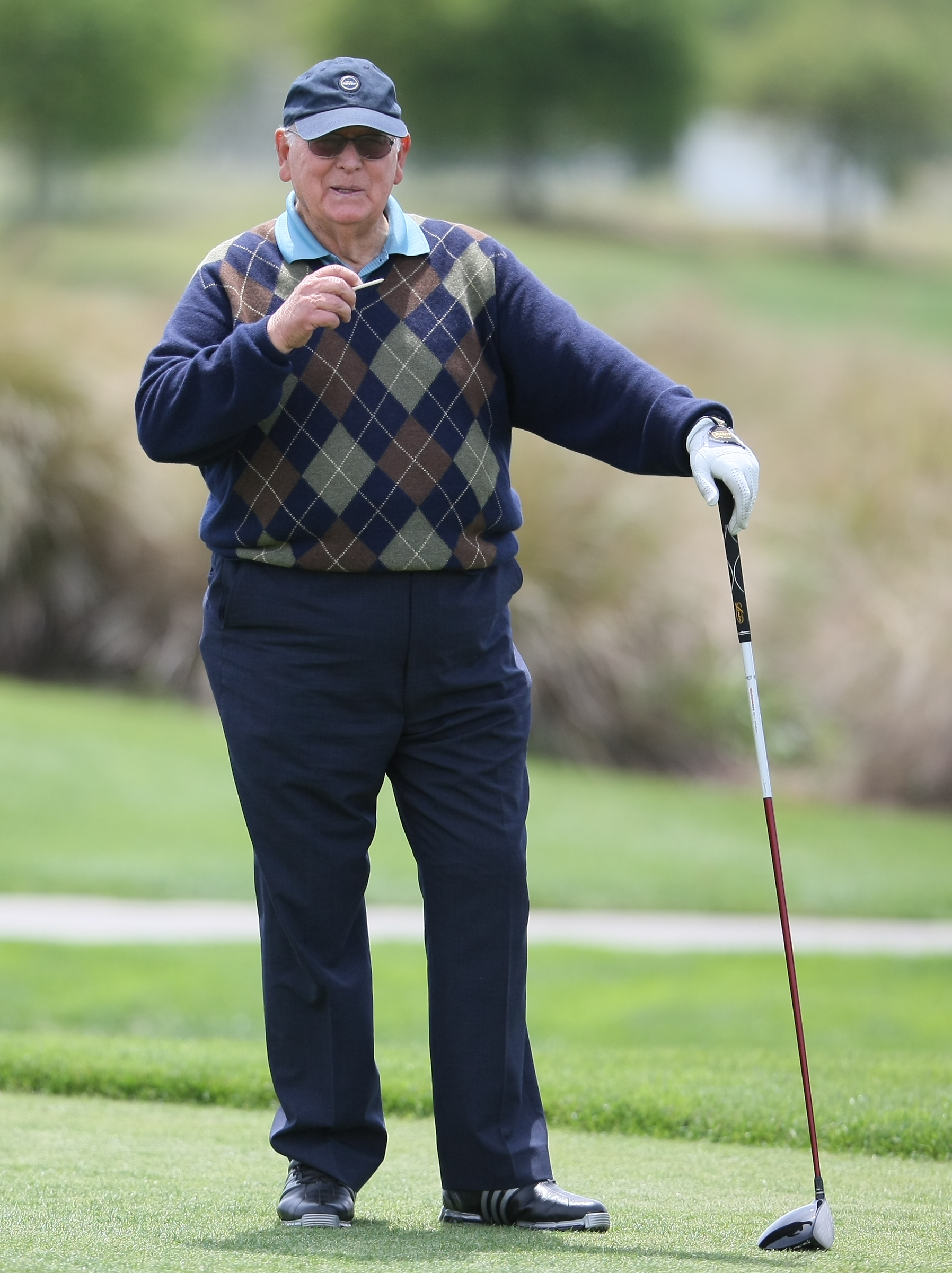
Casper in 2010

After his professional career, Casper was a designer for many golf courses, such as The Highlands, The Palm, and Eagle Crest in Sun City Summerlin, Nevada. He also designed the Hidden Oaks Golf Course, 9 holes of a beloved Par 3 in a residential neighborhood just north of Santa Barbara, CA. Chula Vista Golf Course, designed by Casper, is a par 73 with three par 5's on the front nine and two on the back. Billy Casper Golf (BCG) is one of the largest privately owned golf course management companies in the United States, with roughly 150 owned or managed courses in their portfolio. BCG annually hosts the "World's Largest Golf Outing" – a national golf outing fundraiser benefiting military charities.

=== Acting ===
Casper had a cameo appearance in the movie, Now You See Him, Now You Don't.

=== Billy's Kids ===
Casper was active in charitable work for children and hosted fundraisers, including an annual tournament at San Diego Country Club for "Billy's Kids".

== Awards and honors ==
- In 1978, Casper was inducted into the World Golf Hall of Fame
- In 2000, he was ranked as the 15th greatest golfer of all time by Golf Digest magazine

== Bibliography ==
- Casper, Billy; Toski, Bob (1966). Golf Shotmaking. Golf Digest/Doubleday. ASIN B0000CN8TV.
- Casper, Billy; Barkow, Al (1980). The Good Sense of Golf. Prentice-Hall. ISBN 978-0133605112.
- Casper, Billy; Parkinson, James; Benson, Lee (2012). The Big Three And Me. Genesis Press. ISBN 978-1-58571-628-9.

== Professional wins (72) ==
=== PGA Tour wins (51) ===
Legend
Major championships (3)
Other PGA Tour (48)

No.	Date	Tournament	Winning score	Margin of victory	Runner(s)-up
1	Jul 15, 1956	Labatt Open	−14 (68-68-67-71=274)	2 strokes	(United States) Jimmy Demaret
2	Feb 3, 1957	Phoenix Open Invitational	−9 (68-71-65-67=271)	3 strokes	(United States) Cary Middlecoff, (United States) Mike Souchak
3	Apr 28, 1957	Kentucky Derby Open Invitational	−7 (68-68-71-70=277)	1 stroke	(Australia) Peter Thomson
4	Jan 12, 1958	Bing Crosby National Pro-Am Golf Championship	−11 (71-66-69-71=277)	4 strokes	(United States) Dave Marr
5	Mar 12, 1958	Greater New Orleans Open Invitational	−10 (69-70-70-69=278)	Playoff	(United States) Ken Venturi
6	Jun 23, 1958	Buick Open Invitational	−3 (70-73-71-71=285)	1 stroke	(United States) Ted Kroll, (United States) Arnold Palmer
7	Jun 14, 1959	U.S. Open	+2 (71-68-69-74=282)	1 stroke	(United States) Bob Rosburg
8	Oct 4, 1959	Portland Centennial Open Invitational	−19 (69-64-67-69=269)	3 strokes	(United States) Bob Duden, (United States) Dave Ragan
9	Nov 15, 1959	Lafayette Open Invitational	−11 (69-64-71-69=273)	4 strokes	(United States) George Bayer
10	Nov 22, 1959	Mobile Sertoma Open Invitational	−8 (71-68-68-73=280)	2 strokes	(United States) Wes Ellis, (United States) Dave Ragan
11	Sep 25, 1960	Portland Open Invitational (2)	−22 (68-67-66-65=266)	2 strokes	(United States) Paul Harney
12	Oct 3, 1960	Hesperia Open Invitational	−13 (70-68-67-70=275)	5 strokes	(United States) Bob Rosburg
13	Oct 16, 1960	Orange County Open Invitational	−8 (70-68-69-69=276)	1 stroke	(United States) Charlie Sifford
14	Sep 24, 1961	Portland Open Invitational (3)	−15 (68-71-67-67=273)	1 stroke	(United States) Dave Hill
15	Mar 26, 1962	Doral C.C. Open Invitational	−5 (70-67-75-71=283)	1 stroke	(United States) Pete Bondeson
16	Apr 15, 1962	Greater Greensboro Open	−9 (69-70-68-68=275)	1 stroke	(United States) Mike Souchak
17	May 27, 1962	500 Festival Open Invitation	−20 (66-67-67-64=264)	1 stroke	(United States) George Bayer, (United States) Jerry Steelsmith
18	Oct 14, 1962	Bakersfield Open Invitational	−16 (69-71-65-67=272)	4 strokes	(United States) Tony Lema
19	Jan 20, 1963	Bing Crosby National Pro-Am (2)	−3 (73-65-73-74=285)	1 stroke	(United States) Dave Hill, (United States) Jack Nicklaus, (South Africa) Gary Player, (United States) Bob Rosburg, (United States) Art Wall Jr.
20	Aug 18, 1963	Insurance City Open Invitational	−13 (67-68-71-65=271)	1 stroke	(United States) George Bayer
21	Mar 22, 1964	Doral Open Invitational (2)	−11 (70-70-67-70=277)	1 stroke	(United States) Jack Nicklaus
22	May 10, 1964	Colonial National Invitation	−1 (72-67-70-70=279)	4 strokes	(United States) Tommy Jacobs
23	Sep 27, 1964	Greater Seattle Open Invitational	−15 (68-67-66-64=265)	2 strokes	(United States) Mason Rudolph
24	Nov 3, 1964	Almaden Open Invitational	−9 (68-70-73-68=279)	Playoff	(United States) Pete Brown, (United States) Jerry Steelsmith
25	Feb 7, 1965	Bob Hope Desert Classic	−12 (70-70-69-67-72=348)	1 stroke	(United States) Tommy Aaron, (United States) Arnold Palmer
26	Jul 4, 1965	Western Open	−14 (70-66-70-64=270)	2 strokes	(United States) Jack McGowan, (United States) Chi-Chi Rodríguez
27	Jul 25, 1965	Insurance City Open Invitational (2)	−10 (70-72-66-66=274)	Playoff	(United States) Johnny Pott
28	Oct 23, 1965	Sahara Invitational	−15 (66-66-68-69=269)	3 strokes	(United States) Billy Martindale
29	Jan 16, 1966	San Diego Open Invitational	−16 (70-66-68-64=268)	4 strokes	(United States) Tommy Aaron, (United States) Tom Weiskopf
30	Jun 20, 1966	U.S. Open (2)	−2 (69-68-73-68=278)	Playoff	(United States) Arnold Palmer
31	Jun 26, 1966	Western Open (2)	−1 (69-72-72-70=283)	3 strokes	(United States) Gay Brewer
32	Jul 31, 1966	500 Festival Open Invitation (2)	−11 (69-70-68-70=277)	3 strokes	(United States) R. H. Sikes
33	Jul 3, 1967	Canadian Open	−5 (69-70-71-69=279)	Playoff	(United States) Art Wall Jr.
34	Sep 4, 1967	Carling World Open	−3 (74-68-70-69=281)	Playoff	(United States) Al Geiberger
35	Jan 28, 1968	Los Angeles Open	−10 (70-67-68-69=274)	3 strokes	(United States) Arnold Palmer
36	Apr 8, 1968	Greater Greensboro Open (2)	−17 (65-67-69-66=267)	4 strokes	(United States) George Archer, (United States) Gene Littler, (United States) Bobby Nichols
37	May 19, 1968	Colonial National Invitation (2)	−5 (68-71-68-68=275)	5 strokes	(United States) Gene Littler
38	Jun 9, 1968	500 Festival Open Invitation (3)	−8 (70-71-69-70=280)	1 stroke	(United States) Frank Beard, (United States) Mike Hill
39	Sep 8, 1968	Greater Hartford Open Invitational (3)	−18 (68-65-67-66=266)	3 strokes	(Australia) Bruce Crampton
40	Nov 3, 1968	Lucky International Open	−15 (68-65-70-66=269)	4 strokes	(United States) Raymond Floyd, (United States) Don Massengale
41	Feb 9, 1969	Bob Hope Desert Classic (2)	−15 (71-68-71-69-66=345)	3 strokes	(United States) Dave Hill
42	Jun 8, 1969	Western Open (3)	−8 (72-69-68-67=276)	4 strokes	(United States) Rocky Thompson
43	Sep 28, 1969	Alcan Open	−14 (70-68-70-66=274)	1 stroke	(United States) Lee Trevino
44	Jan 11, 1970	Los Angeles Open (2)	−8 (68-68-68-72=276)	Playoff	(United States) Hale Irwin
45	Apr 13, 1970	Masters Tournament	−9 (72-68-68-71=279)	Playoff	(United States) Gene Littler
46	Jul 19, 1970	IVB-Philadelphia Golf Classic	−14 (68-67-71-68=274)	3 strokes	(United States) Terry Wilcox
47	Aug 24, 1970	AVCO Golf Classic	−11 (68-67-73-69=277)	1 stroke	(United States) Rod Funseth, (United States) Tom Weiskopf
48	Oct 24, 1971	Kaiser International Open Invitational	−19 (67-65-69-68=269)	4 strokes	(United States) Fred Marti
49	Jul 1, 1973	Western Open (4)	−12 (67-69-67-69=272)	1 stroke	(United States) Larry Hinson, (United States) Hale Irwin
50	Sep 3, 1973	Sammy Davis Jr.-Greater Hartford Open (4)	−20 (67-65-68-64=264)	1 stroke	(Australia) Bruce Devlin
51	May 18, 1975	First NBC New Orleans Open (2)	−17 (67-68-66-70=271)	2 strokes	(England) Peter Oosterhuis

PGA Tour playoff record (8–8)

No.	Year	Tournament	Opponent(s)	Result
1	1958	Greater New Orleans Open Invitational	(United States) Ken Venturi	Won with an eagle on the second extra hole
2	1961	Buick Open	(United States) Jack Burke Jr., (United States) Johnny Pott	Burke won 18-hole playoff; Burke: −1 (71), Casper: +2 (74), Pott: +2 (74)
3	1964	Almaden Open Invitational	(United States) Pete Brown, (United States) Jerry Steelsmith	Won with a birdie on the third extra hole after 18-hole playoff; Casper: −4 (68), Brown: −4 (68), Steelsmith: +1 (73)
4	1965	San Diego Open Invitational	(United States) Wes Ellis	Lost to a birdie on the first extra hole
5	1965	Insurance City Open Invitational	(United States) Johnny Pott	Won with a birdie on the first extra hole
6	1966	U.S. Open	(United States) Arnold Palmer	Won 18-hole playoff; Casper: −1 (69), Palmer: +3 (73)
7	1967	Canadian Open	(United States) Art Wall Jr.	Won 18-hole playoff; Casper: −6 (65), Wall: −2 (69)
8	1967	Carling World Open	(United States) Al Geiberger	Won with a par on the first extra hole
9	1967	Hawaiian Open	(United States) Dudley Wysong	Lost to par on the first extra hole
10	1968	Bing Crosby National Pro-Am	(Australia) Bruce Devlin, (United States) Johnny Pott	Pott won with a birdie on the first extra hole
11	1969	Kaiser International Open Invitational	(United States) George Archer, (United States) Don January, (United States) Jack Nicklaus	Nicklaus won with birdie on second extra hole January eliminated by birdie on first hole
12	1970	Los Angeles Open	(United States) Hale Irwin	Won with a birdie on the first extra hole
13	1970	Masters Tournament	(United States) Gene Littler	Won 18-hole playoff; Casper: −3 (69), Littler: +2 (74)
14	1971	Glen Campbell-Los Angeles Open	(United States) Bob Lunn	Lost to a birdie on the fourth extra hole
15	1972	Byron Nelson Golf Classic	(United States) Chi-Chi Rodríguez	Lost to a birdie on the first extra hole
16	1975	World Open Golf Championship	(United States) Jack Nicklaus	Lost to par on the first extra hole

=== European Tour wins (1) ===
No.	Date	Tournament	Winning score	Margin of victory	Runner-up
1	Oct 19, 1975	Italian Open	−2 (74-69-70-73=286)	1 stroke	(Scotland) Brian Barnes

=== Latin American wins (4) ===
No.	Date	Tournament	Winning score	Margin of victory	Runner-up
1	Sep 14, 1958	Brazil Open	−14 (67-66-67-70=270)	9 strokes	(Argentina) Leopoldo Ruiz
2	Nov 30, 1958	Havana Invitational	−10 (68-66-76-68=278)	2 strokes	(United States) Bo Wininger
3	Oct 25, 1958	Brazil Open (2)	−4 (67-67-66-68=268)	6 strokes	(Brazil) Mário Gonzalez
4	Nov 13, 1977	Mexican Open	−6 (68-67-68-71=274)	3 strokes	(United States) Gay Brewer

=== Other wins (6) ===
No.	Date	Tournament	Winning score	Margin of victory	Runner(s)-up
1	Nov 7, 1971	Miki Gold Cup	−8 (70-70-68=208)	Shared title with (Japan) Masashi Ozaki	
2	Dec 9, 1973	Hassan II Golf Trophy	−4 (69-70-73-76=288)	5 strokes	(United States) Rod Funseth
3	Oct 6, 1974	Trophée Lancôme	−5 (66-74-70-73=283)	3 strokes	(United States) Hale Irwin
4	Oct 13, 1974	Lancia d'Oro	−5 (68-69-72=209)	5 strokes	(South Africa) Bobby Cole
5	Dec 14, 1975	Hassan II Golf Trophy (2)	−8 (72-71-73-68=284)	11 strokes	(United States) Tommy Aaron, (United States) Ron Cerrudo
6	Mar 14, 1976	Gran Premio Is Molas	+4 (74-71-70-77=292)	Playoff	(United States) Lanny Wadkins

=== Senior PGA Tour wins (9) ===
Legend
Senior PGA Tour major championships (2)
Other Senior PGA Tour (7)

No.	Date	Tournament	Winning score	Margin of victory	Runner(s)-up
1	Aug 28, 1982	Shootout at Jeremy Ranch	−9 (74-71-69-65=279)	1 stroke	(United States) Miller Barber, (United States) Don January
2	Sep 19, 1982	Merrill Lynch/Golf Digest Commemorative Pro-Am	−10 (68-7-68=206)	Playoff	(United States) Bob Toski
3	Jul 25, 1983	U.S. Senior Open	+4 (73-73-69-73=288)	Playoff	(United States) Rod Funseth
4	Apr 22, 1984	Senior PGA Tour Roundup	−14 (68-69-65=202)	2 strokes	(United States) Bob Stone
5	Mar 15, 1987	Del E. Webb Arizona Classic	−15 (68-65-68=201)	5 strokes	(New Zealand) Bob Charles, (United States) Dale Douglass
6	Jun 28, 1987	Greater Grand Rapids Open	−13 (69-68-63=200)	3 strokes	(United States) Miller Barber
7	May 8, 1988	Vantage at The Dominion	−14 (70-68-67=205)	1 stroke	(United States) Chi-Chi Rodríguez
8	Jun 12, 1988	Mazda Senior Tournament Players Championship	−10 (69-68-74-67=278)	2 strokes	(United States) Al Geiberger
9	Oct 22, 1989	Transamerica Senior Golf Championship	−9 (69-70-68=207)	3 strokes	(United States) Al Geiberger

Senior PGA Tour playoff record (2–3)

No.	Year	Tournament	Opponent(s)	Result
1	1981	U.S. Senior Open	(United States) Arnold Palmer, (United States) Bob Stone	Palmer won 18-hole playoff; Palmer: E (70), Stone: +4 (74), Casper: +7 (77)
2	1982	Merrill Lynch/Golf Digest Commemorative Pro-Am	(United States) Bob Toski	Won with a birdie on the fourth extra hole
3	1983	Gatlin Brothers Seniors Golf Classic	(United States) Don January	Lost to par on the fifth extra hole
4	1983	U.S. Senior Open	(United States) Rod Funseth	Won with birdie on first extra hole after 18-hole playoff; Casper: +4 (75), Funseth: +4 (75)
5	1988	United Hospitals Classic	(Australia) Bruce Crampton	Lost to a birdie on the first extra hole

=== Other senior wins (1) ===
- 1984 Liberty Mutual Legends of Golf (with Gay Brewer)

== Major championships ==
=== Wins (3) ===
Year	Championship	54 holes	Winning score	Margin	Runner-up
1959	U.S. Open	3 shot lead	−2 (71-68-69-74=282)	1 stroke	Bob Rosburg
1966	U.S. Open (2)	3 shot deficit	−2 (69-68-73-68=278)	Playoff ^{1}	Arnold Palmer
1970	Masters Tournament	1 shot lead	−9 (72-68-68-71=279)	Playoff ^{2}	Gene Littler

^{1} Defeated Palmer in an 18-hole playoff: Casper 69 (−1), Palmer 73 (+3).
^{2} Defeated Littler in an 18-hole playoff: Casper 69 (−3), Littler 74 (+2).

=== Results timeline ===
Tournament	1956	1957	1958	1959
Masters Tournament		T16	T20	CUT
U.S. Open	T14	CUT	T13	1
The Open Championship				
PGA Championship			2	T17

Tournament	1960	1961	1962	1963	1964	1965	1966	1967	1968	1969
Masters Tournament	4	T7	T15	T11	T5	T35	T10	T24	T16	T2
U.S. Open	T12	T17	CUT		4	T17	1	4	T9	T40
The Open Championship									4	T25
PGA Championship	T24	T15	T51		T9	T2	T3	19	T6	T35

Tournament	1970	1971	1972	1973	1974	1975	1976	1977	1978	1979
Masters Tournament	1	T13	T17	T17	T37	6	8	T14	CUT	43
U.S. Open	T8	CUT	T11	CUT	CUT		CUT		T30	
The Open Championship	T17	T7	T40							
PGA Championship	T18	2	T4	T35	T63	T5	T51	T31	CUT	CUT

Tournament	1980	1981	1982	1983	1984	1985	1986	1987	1988	1989
Masters Tournament	CUT	CUT	CUT	CUT	CUT	T57	CUT	T50	CUT	CUT
U.S. Open										
The Open Championship										
PGA Championship	CUT		T67	CUT						

Tournament	1990	1991	1992	1993	1994	1995	1996	1997	1998	1999
Masters Tournament	CUT	CUT		CUT	CUT	CUT	CUT	CUT	CUT	WD
U.S. Open										
The Open Championship										
PGA Championship										

Tournament	2000	2001	2002	2003	2004	2005
Masters Tournament	WD	CUT				WD
U.S. Open						
The Open Championship						
PGA Championship						

Win
Top 10
Did not play

CUT = missed the half-way cut
WD = withdrew
"T" = tied

=== Summary ===
Tournament	Wins	2nd	3rd	Top-5	Top-10	Top-25	Events	Cuts made
Masters Tournament	1	1	0	4	8	18	45	23
U.S. Open	2	0	0	4	6	12	20	14
The Open Championship	0	0	0	1	2	4	5	5
PGA Championship	0	3	1	6	8	13	24	20
Totals	3	4	1	15	24	47	94	62

- Most consecutive cuts made – 27 (1962 PGA – 1971 Masters)
- Longest streak of top-10s – 4 (twice)

== Champions Tour major championships ==
=== Wins (2) ===
Year	Championship	Winning score	Margin	Runner-up
1983	United States Senior Open	+4 (73-69-73-73=288)	Playoff^{1}	Rod Funseth
1988	Mazda Senior Tournament Players Championship	−10 (69-68-74-67=278)	2 strokes	Al Geiberger

^{1} The 18-hole playoff finished in a tie, Casper (75) to Funseth (75), Casper won with a birdie on the first sudden-death hole.

== U.S. national team appearances ==
Professional

- Ryder Cup: 1961 (winners), 1963 (winners), 1965 (winners), 1967 (winners), 1969 (winners), 1971 (winners), 1973 (winners), 1975 (winners), 1979 (winners, non-playing captain)

== See also ==
- List of golfers with most PGA Tour wins
- List of men's major championships winning golfers
- List of longest PGA Tour win streaks
