= Tommy Jacobs =

American professional golfer (1935–2022)

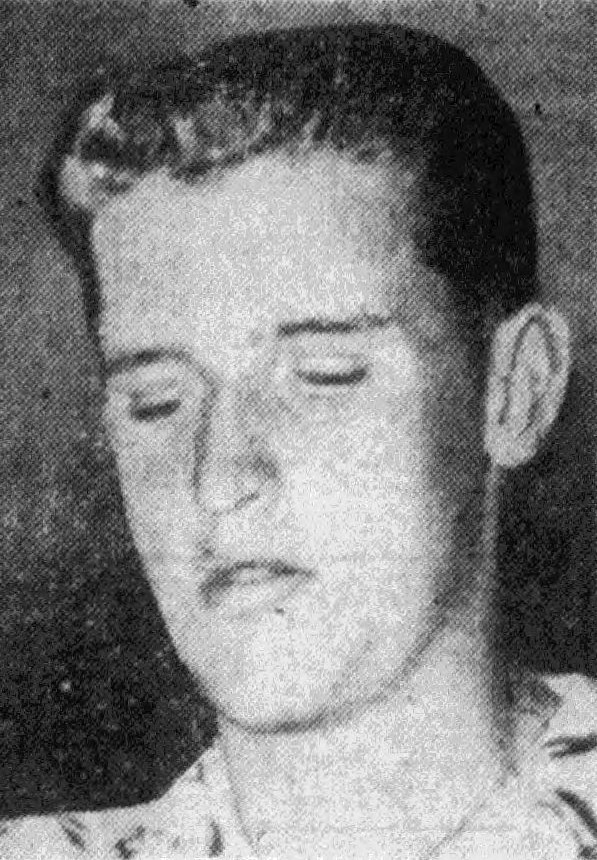
- Jacobs, circa 1951

Personal information
- Full name: Keith Thomas Jacobs Jr.
- Nationality: United States
- Born: February 13, 1935 Denver, Colorado, U.S.
- Died: July 9, 2022 (aged 87) Reno, Nevada, U.S.
- Height: 5 ft 10 in (1.78 m)
- Weight: 160 lb (73 kg; 11 st)

Career
- Sport: Golf
- Turned professional: 1956
- Former tours: PGA Tour; Champions Tour
- Professional wins: 7

Number of wins by tour
- PGA Tour: 4
- Other: 3

Best results in major championships
- Masters Tournament: 2nd: 1966
- PGA Championship: T8: 1963
- U.S. Open: 2nd: 1964
- The Open Championship: DNP
- British Amateur: R64: 1955

Keith Thomas Jacobs Jr. (February 13, 1935 – July 9, 2022) was an American professional golfer and golf course owner/operator who played on the PGA Tour and the Champions Tour. He was the older brother of professional golfer John Jacobs.

== Early life ==
In 1935, Jacobs was born in Denver, Colorado. He was raised in southern California where he started in junior golf. In 1951, Jacobs won the U.S. Junior Amateur. At sixteen, he advanced to the semifinals of the U.S. Amateur, which earned him an invitation to the Masters Tournament at age 17. For 58 years, Jacobs had the distinction of being the youngest golfer to ever play in the Masters (in 1952). The record was broken by Matteo Manassero in 2010.

== Professional career ==
In 1956, Jacobs turned professional. Jacobs won four PGA Tour events. His first win came in 1958 at the newly revamped Denver Open, and his last was at the 1964 Palm Springs Golf Classic. During his career, Jacobs had sole 2nd-place finishes in two major championships. He lost the 1964 U.S. Open to Ken Venturi by four strokes, and was runner-up in a playoff at the Masters Tournament in 1966 that he (72) and Gay Brewer (78) lost to Jack Nicklaus (70). Jacobs was a member of the 1965 Ryder Cup team, and finished with a record of 3–1–1.

Jacobs joined the Senior PGA Tour in 1985 and continued to play in selected events into the 2000s; his last appearance was at the 2003 Senior PGA Championship.

Jacobs and his brother John teamed up with Roger Fredericks, to form Champions Corporate Golf Outings, which provides custom tailored golf events for small to medium size groups and corporations.

== Personal life ==
Jacobs died on July 9, 2022, at the age of 87.

== Professional wins (7) ==
=== PGA Tour wins (4) ===
No.	Date	Tournament	Winning score	Margin of victory	Runner-up
1	Sep 14, 1958	Denver Open	−14 (65-67-67-67=266)	1 stroke	(United States) Ernie Vossler
2	Jan 14, 1962	San Diego Open Invitational	−7 (72-70-70-65=277)	Playoff	(United States) Johnny Pott
3	Sep 8, 1963	Utah Open	−12 (68-72-62-70=272)	1 stroke	(United States) Don January
4	Feb 2, 1964	Palm Springs Golf Classic	−7 (66-74-74-69-70=353)	Playoff	(United States) Jimmy Demaret

PGA Tour playoff record (2–2)

No.	Year	Tournament	Opponent(s)	Result
1	1962	San Diego Open Invitational	(United States) Johnny Pott	Won with birdie on first extra hole
2	1964	Palm Springs Golf Classic	(United States) Jimmy Demaret	Won with par on second extra hole
3	1966	Masters Tournament	(United States) Gay Brewer, (United States) Jack Nicklaus	Nicklaus won 18-hole playoff; Nicklaus: −2 (70), Jacobs: E (72), Brewer: +6 (78)
4	1969	IVB-Philadelphia Golf Classic	(United States) Gay Brewer, (United States) Dave Hill, (United States) R. H. Sikes	Hill won with birdie on first extra hole

=== Other wins (3) ===
- 1971 Southern California PGA Championship
- 1972 Southern California PGA Championship
- 1976 Southern California PGA Championship

== Results in major championships ==
Amateur

Tournament	1952	1953	1954	1955
Masters Tournament	60			
U.S. Open				
British Amateur				R64

Professional

Tournament	1956	1957	1958	1959
Masters Tournament				CUT
U.S. Open		CUT	T10	T59
PGA Championship				T14

Tournament	1960	1961	1962	1963	1964	1965	1966	1967	1968	1969
Masters Tournament				T28	CUT	T15	2	CUT	CUT	
U.S. Open		CUT	T6	T32	2	T28	CUT	CUT	CUT	
PGA Championship	CUT		T23	T8	CUT	CUT	CUT	T67		

Tournament	1970	1971	1972	1973	1974	1975	1976
Masters Tournament							
U.S. Open							
PGA Championship	T61		CUT	CUT			CUT

Top 10
Did not play

CUT = missed the half-way cut (3rd round cut in 1960 and 1964 PGA Championships)
R64 = Round in which player lost in match play
"T" indicates a tie for a place

Source for Masters, U.S. Open, Open Championship, British Amateur, PGA Championship

Note: Jacobs never played in The Open Championship

=== Summary ===
Tournament	Wins	2nd	3rd	Top-5	Top-10	Top-25	Events	Cuts made
Masters Tournament	0	1	0	1	1	2	8	4
U.S. Open	0	1	0	1	3	3	11	6
The Open Championship	0	0	0	0	0	0	0	0
PGA Championship	0	0	0	0	1	3	12	5
Totals	0	2	0	2	5	8	31	15

- Most consecutive cuts made – 5 (1962 U.S. Open – 1963 PGA)
- Longest streak of top-10s – 1 (five times)

== Team appearances ==
- Ryder Cup: 1965 (winners)
- Diamondhead Cup: 1974 (winners)
