= Johnny Pott =

American professional golfer (born 1935)

Personal information
- Full name: John Francis Pott
- Nationality: United States
- Born: November 6, 1935 (age 90) Cape Girardeau, Missouri, U.S.
- Height: 6 ft 1 in (1.85 m)
- Weight: 195 lb (88 kg; 13.9 st)

Career
- Sport: Golf
- College: LSU
- Turned professional: 1956
- Former tour: PGA Tour
- Professional wins: 5

Number of wins by tour
- PGA Tour: 5

Best results in major championships
- Masters Tournament: T13: 1964
- PGA Championship: T5: 1961
- U.S. Open: T9: 1964
- The Open Championship: DNP

John Francis Pott (born November 6, 1935) is an American professional golfer.

== Career ==
Pott was born in Cape Girardeau, Missouri and reared in southern Mississippi, where he learned to play golf on the course where his father was the club professional. He played collegiately at Louisiana State University, helping the Tigers win the NCAA Championship in 1955.

Pott turned pro in 1956. He won five times on the PGA Tour in the 1960s. He was a member of three Ryder Cup teams; 1963, 1965, and 1967 although he injured his back in 1965 and did not play. His best finish in a major was T-5 at the 1961 PGA Championship.

As his tour playing days were winding down, Pott became involved in the golf course design and golf services business with fellow former Tour pros Ernie Vossler and Joe Walser, Jr. He oversaw the Design and Construction Division of Landmark Golf and the Golf Operations Division of Landmark Golf Management.

In 2008, Langtry Farms announced its appointment of Pott as Langtry’s new Director of Golf Operations. Pott will be responsible for Langtry’s proposed private championship 18-hole golf course and clubhouse in Lake County, California.

== Professional wins (5) ==
=== PGA Tour wins (5) ===
No.	Date	Tournament	Winning score	Margin of victory	Runner(s)-up
1	Sep 5, 1960	Dallas Open Invitational	−5 (70-66-71-68=275)	Playoff	(United States) Ted Kroll, (United States) Bo Wininger
2	Dec 4, 1960	West Palm Beach Open Invitational	−10 (72-71-67-68=278)	3 strokes	(United States) Sam Snead
3	May 6, 1962	Waco Turner Open	−16 (68-71-69-68=276)	6 strokes	(United States) Mason Rudolph
4	Aug 25, 1963	American Golf Classic	−4 (67-68-71-70=276)	4 strokes	(United States) Arnold Palmer
5	Jan 14, 1968	Bing Crosby National Pro-Am	−3 (70-71-71-73=285)	Playoff	(United States) Billy Casper, (Australia) Bruce Devlin

PGA Tour playoff record (2–5)

No.	Year	Tournament	Opponent(s)	Result
1	1960	Dallas Open Invitational	(United States) Ted Kroll, (United States) Bo Wininger	Won with birdie on third extra hole Wininger eliminated by par on first hole
2	1961	Buick Open	(United States) Jack Burke Jr., (United States) Billy Casper	Burke won 18-hole playoff; Burke: −1 (71), Casper: +2 (74), Pott: +2 (74)
3	1962	San Diego Open Invitational	(United States) Tommy Jacobs	Lost to birdie on first extra hole
4	1962	Colonial National Invitation	(United States) Arnold Palmer	Lost 18-hole playoff; Palmer: −1 (69), Pott: +3 (73)
5	1965	Memphis Open Invitational	(United States) Jack Nicklaus	Lost to par on first extra hole
6	1965	Insurance City Open Invitational	(United States) Billy Casper	Lost to birdie on first extra hole
7	1968	Bing Crosby National Pro-Am	(United States) Billy Casper, (Australia) Bruce Devlin	Won with birdie on first extra hole

== Results in major championships ==
Tournament	1957	1958	1959	1960	1961	1962	1963	1964	1965	1966	1967	1968	1969	1970	1971	1972
Masters Tournament					T19	T20	T21	T13	T42	CUT	CUT	T43	28			
U.S. Open	41		T19	T15	CUT	T48	CUT	T9	CUT	CUT		62	CUT			CUT
PGA Championship				T15	T5	T27	CUT	CUT	T28	WD	CUT	T34	T19		CUT	

Note: Pott never played in The Open Championship.

Top 10
Did not play

CUT = missed the half-way cut
WD = withdrew
"T" indicates a tie for a place

== U.S. national team appearances ==
Professional

- Ryder Cup: 1963 (winners), 1965 (winners), 1967 (winners)
