= 1959 PGA Championship =

Coordinates: 44.964°N 93.395°W

Tournament information
- Dates: July 30 – August 2, 1959
- Location: St. Louis Park, Minnesota
- Course(s): Minneapolis Golf Club
- Organized by: PGA of America
- Tour(s): PGA Tour
- Format: Stroke play

Statistics
- Par: 70
- Length: 6,850 yards (6,264 m)
- Field: 174 players, 100 after 1st cut 64 after 2nd cut
- Cut: 150 (+10) (1st cut); 221 (+11) (2nd cut)
- Prize fund: $51,175
- Winner's share: $8,250

Champion
- (United States) Bob Rosburg
- 277 (−3)

The 1959 PGA Championship was the 41st PGA Championship played from July 30 to August 2 at Minneapolis Golf Club in St. Louis Park, Minnesota, a suburb west of Minneapolis.

Six strokes back at the start of the final round, Bob Rosburg shot a 66 (−4) to win his only major championship at 277 (−3), one stroke ahead of runners-up Jerry Barber and Doug Sanders. Rosburg had managed only five birdies in the first three rounds, but had five in the first nine on Sunday to go out in 30, then a record. Barber shot a 65 on Friday and was the 36-hole and 54-hole leader at 205 (−5), with Sanders a stroke back. Barber won the title two years later, in a Monday playoff in 1961. Tied for fourteenth at 286 (+6) was Arnold Palmer.

This was the second year of stroke play at the PGA Championship, a match play event through 1957. Daily admission was three dollars on Thursday and Friday, and five dollars per day on the weekend. The winner's share was increased fifty per cent to $8,250; two years earlier, it was $8,000 for the final match play competition.

The Open Championship was played several weeks earlier in Scotland at Muirfield; only four Americans (two amateurs) were in the field and none made the cut.

== Round summaries ==
=== First round ===
Thursday, July 30, 1959

Place	Player	Score	To par
T1	(United States) Jerry Barber	69	−1
T1	(United States) Jackson Bradley	69	−1
T1	(United States) Walter Burkemo	69	−1
T1	(United States) Billy Casper	69	−1
T1	(United States) Dick Hart	69	−1
T1	(United States) Chuck Klein	69	−1
T1	(United States) Mike Krak	69	−1
T1	(United States) Gene Littler	69	−1
T1	(United States) Mike Souchak	69	−1
T10	(United States) Jack Burke Jr.	70	E
T10	(United States) Buster Cupit	70	E
T10	(United States) Don Fairfield	70	E
T10	(United States) Al Feminelli	70	E
T10	(United States) Billy Maxwell	70	E
T10	(United States) Herman Scharlau	70	E
T10	(United States) Don Shock	70	E
T10	(United States) Ken Venturi	70	E
T10	(United States) Art Wall Jr.	70	E

=== Second round ===
Friday, July 31, 1959

Place	Player	Score	To par
1	(United States) Jerry Barber	69-65=134	−6
2	(United States) Mike Souchak	69-67=136	−4
3	(United States) Doug Sanders	72-66=138	−2
T4	(United States) Dow Finsterwald	71-68=139	−1
T4	(United States) Gene Littler	69-70=139	−1
T6	(United States) Billy Casper	69-71=140	E
T6	(United States) Lionel Hebert	71-69=140	E
T6	(United States) Cary Middlecoff	72-68=140	E
T9	(United States) Walter Burkemo	69-71=141	+1
T9	(United States) Fred Hawkins	72-69=141	+1
T9	(United States) Bob Goalby	72-69=141	+1

=== Third round ===
Saturday, August 1, 1959

Place	Player	Score	To par
1	(United States) Jerry Barber	69-65-71=205	−5
2	(United States) Doug Sanders	72-66-68=206	−4
3	(United States) Mike Souchak	69-67-71=207	−3
T4	(United States) Dow Finsterwald	71-68-71=210	E
T4	(United States) Cary Middlecoff	72-68-70=210	E
T6	(United States) Jay Hebert	72-70-69=211	+1
T6	(United States) Gene Littler	69-70-72=211	+1
T6	(United States) Bob Rosburg	71-72-68=211	+1
T9	(United States) Tommy Jacobs	73-71-68=212	+2
T9	(United States) Sam Snead	71-73-68=212	+2
T9	(United States) Ken Venturi	70-72-70=212	+2

=== Final round ===
Sunday, August 2, 1959

Place	Player	Score	To par	Money ($)
1	(United States) Bob Rosburg	71-72-68-66=277	−3	8,250
T2	(United States) Jerry Barber	69-65-71-73=278	−2	3,563
T2	(United States) Doug Sanders	72-66-68-72=278	−2	3,563
4	(United States) Dow Finsterwald	71-68-71-70=280	E	2,500
T5	(United States) Bob Goalby	72-69-72-68=281	+1	2,000
T5	(United States) Mike Souchak	69-67-71-74=281	+1	2,000
T5	(United States) Ken Venturi	70-72-70-69=281	+1	2,000
T8	(United States) Cary Middlecoff	72-68-70-72=282	+2	1,600
T8	(United States) Sam Snead	71-73-68-70=282	+2	1,600
10	(United States) Gene Littler	69-70-72-73=284	+4	1,450

=== Scorecard ===
Final round

Hole	1	2	3	4	5	6	7	8	9	10	11	12	13	14	15	16	17	18
Par	4	4	5	3	4	3	4	4	4	3	4	4	4	4	5	3	4	4
(United States) Rosburg	+1	E	−1	−1	−2	−2	−2	−3	−4	−4	−4	−3	−3	−3	−3	−3	−3	−3
(United States) Barber	−5	−5	−5	−5	−5	−5	−5	−4	−4	−4	−4	−3	−3	−3	−4	−4	−3	−2
(United States) Sanders	−4	−4	−4	−3	−2	−2	−2	−2	−3	−3	−3	−2	−2	−2	−2	−2	−1	−2

Cumulative tournament scores, relative to par

Birdie	Bogey	Double bogey
