= Colonial Country Club (Memphis) =

Private golf club in Memphis, Tennessee

Coordinates: 35.196817°N 89.778621°W

Colonial Country Club is a private golf club in Memphis, Tennessee, United States, in the Cordova neighborhood. For many years, it was host to an annual PGA Tour event.

== History ==
The club was founded in 1913 by some local businessmen in what was then called White Station, Tennessee.

The first 18-hole course was opened on August 7, 1914, and in 1915 the first clubhouse opened.

On December 16, 1919, the clubhouse was destroyed in a fire, blamed on defective wiring. In the summer of 1921, a new clubhouse opened.

Colonial Country Club remained in this location for over forty years. In 1968, the club announced plans to relocate in Cordova near Interstate 40, although this could be unknown. However (rather this was planned or not), the country club and its golf courses were relocated to Cordova in 1971 and possibly the clubhouse and the courses would open that next year. Colonial Country Club has been located there ever since. The new venue would offer two separate 18-hole championship golf courses, as well as a 300-yard (270 m) practice area, a 40,000 square feet (3,700 m^{2}) clubhouse, an Olympic sized swimming pool, 6 tennis courts, and snack-bar/dressing facility. Both courses were designed by Joe Finger.

== Courses ==
The two courses are known as the North Course and the South Course. The South Course is the course which hosted the professional tour events.

== Tournaments ==
Colonial has hosted many tournaments at both of its locations, including the Memphis Open, now known as the St. Jude Classic. This PGA Tour event began in 1958 and was played at Colonial through 1988. Many years, regional qualifying for the U.S. Open has taken place at Colonial.

== 1977 ==
1977 was the most memorable year for Colonial as two huge events occurred which made national news at the PGA Tour event (then known as the Danny Thomas Memphis Classic).

1. President Gerald Ford made a hole-in-one during Wednesday's Celebrity Pro-Am.

2. Two days later, Al Geiberger shot a record low round of 59 on Friday of the tournament. The 13-under-par round remains a record in relation to par on the PGA Tour. (Although Jim Furyk shot a 58 at the 2016 Travelers Championship, it was a Par 70 course, 12 under par).

== Champions ==
Champions of the PGA Tour events held at Colonial:

Federal Express St. Jude Classic

- 1988 Jodie Mudd
- 1987 Curtis Strange
- 1986 Mike Hulbert

St. Jude Memphis Classic

- 1985 Hal Sutton (playoff)

Danny Thomas Memphis Classic

- 1984 Bob Eastwood
- 1983 Larry Mize
- 1982 Raymond Floyd
- 1981 Jerry Pate
- 1980 Lee Trevino
- 1979 Gil Morgan (playoff)
- 1978 Andy Bean (playoff)
- 1977 Al Geiberger
- 1976 Gibby Gilbert
- 1975 Gene Littler
- 1974 Gary Player
- 1973 Dave Hill
- 1972 Lee Trevino
- 1971 Lee Trevino
- 1970 Dave Hill

Memphis Open Invitational

- 1969 Dave Hill
- 1968 Bob Lunn
- 1967 Dave Hill
- 1966 Bert Yancey
- 1965 Jack Nicklaus (playoff)
- 1964 Mike Souchak
- 1963 Tony Lema (playoff)
- 1962 Lionel Hebert (playoff)
- 1961 Cary Middlecoff
- 1960 Tommy Bolt (playoff)

Memphis Open

- 1959 Don Whitt (playoff)
- 1958 Billy Maxwell
