= Miami Valley Golf Club =

Golf club in Ohio, United States

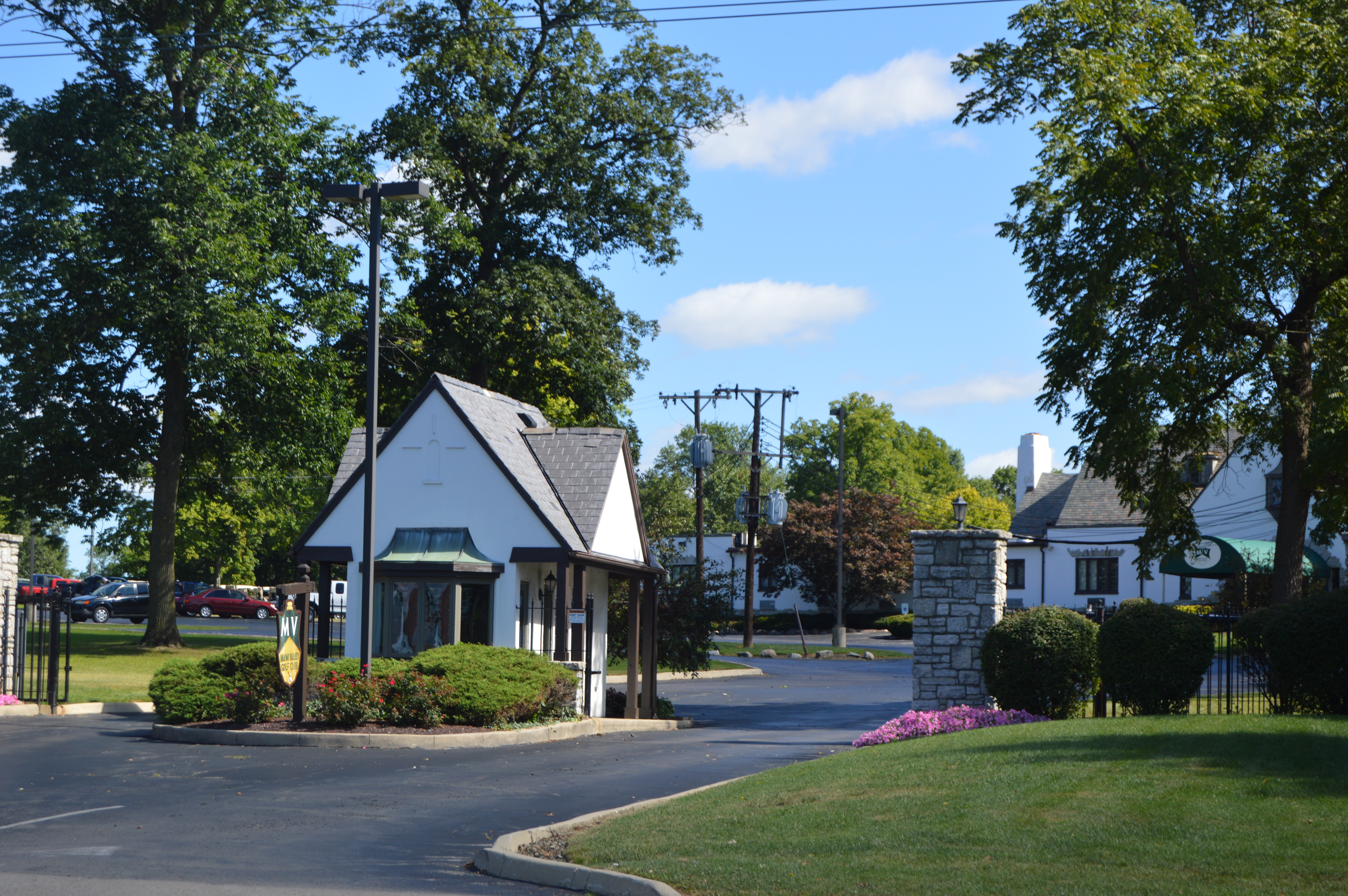
- Golf Club entrance
- Interactive map of Miami Valley Golf Club
- 39°17′30″N 84°14′30″W

Club information
- Location: Dayton, Ohio, U.S.
- Established: 1919
- Type: Private
- Total holes: 18
- Tournaments: 1931 Western Open; 1957 PGA Championship; 1996 Ohio Amateur
- Greens: Bent grass
- Fairways: Bent grass
- Website: MiamiValleyGolfClub.com
- Designed by: Donald Ross
- Par: 71
- Length: 6,795
- Course rating: 72.4
- Slope rating: 129

Miami Valley Golf Club is a golf club located on both sides of the border between Fort McKinley (in Harrison Township, Montgomery County) and Dayton, Ohio, USA. The golf course was designed by Donald Ross. The club was established on June 3, 1919. The club hosted the PGA Championship in 1957, which was the last time the competition was played under the matchplay format. Lionel Hebert won the competition beating Dow Finsterwald. The match ended on the par-3 17th, by a margin of 2 & 1.

The club was listed on the National Register of Historic Places in 2015.

== Score card ==
Miami Valley Golf Club
Tee	Rating/Slope	1	2	3	4	5	6	7	8	9	Out	10	11	12	13	14	15	16	17	18	In	Total
Black	72.1/125	500	399	580	343	223	413	419	198	418	3493	412	364	452	143	329	501	422	165	435	3223	6716
Blue	M:70.1/124 W:76.0/132	489	377	565	336	152	403	380	165	386	3253	401	357	380	136	319	491	412	150	423	3069	6322
White	M:68.2/120 W:73.5/126	462	356	479	328	130	389	341	154	370	3009	392	349	366	129	301	434	354	136	389	2850	5859
Green	M:65.7/115 W:70.1/116	457	320	474	321	111	306	336	142	343	2810	298	276	302	122	296	428	298	129	344	2493	5303
Par		5	4	5	4	3	4	4	3	4	36	4	4	4	3	4	5	4	3	4	35	71
SI	Men's	7	5	1	13	17	3	11	15	9		6	14	4	18	16	8	2	12	10
SI	Women's	1	9	3	7	15	11	13	17	5		8	16	14	12	6	2	4	18	10
