= Don Fairfield =

American golfer (born 1929)

Personal information
- Full name: Donald W. Fairfield
- Nationality: United States
- Born: October 13, 1929 (age 97) Wichita, Kansas, U.S.

Career
- Sport: Golf
- Status: Professional
- Former tours: PGA Tour; Champions Tour
- Professional wins: 3

Number of wins by tour
- PGA Tour: 3

Best results in major championships
- Masters Tournament: T37: 1964
- PGA Championship: T5: 1955
- U.S. Open: T17: 1957
- The Open Championship: CUT: 1953

Donald W. Fairfield (born October 18, 1929) is an American professional golfer who played on the PGA Tour and the Senior PGA Tour.

== Early life ==
In 1929, Fairfield was born in Kansas. However, he grew up in Jacksonville, Illinois.

Fairfield served in the U.S. Air Force.

== Professional career ==
Fairfield played full-time on the PGA Tour between 1956 and 1963, and won three times. He was head professional at Casey Country Club in Casey, Illinois from 1954 to 1955; and at Eldorado Country Club in Indian Wells, California from 1964 to 1997. His best finish in a major championship was a loss in the quarterfinals (T-5) at the 1955 PGA Championship.

Fairfield played sparingly on the Senior PGA Tour from 1980 to 1989. His best result was in his first event, a T-16 at the Atlantic City Senior International in 1980.

== Personal life ==
Fairfield and his wife, Iris, have two sons, Jim and Jeff; both are golf professionals.

== Professional wins (3) ==
=== PGA Tour wins (3) ===
| No. | Date | Tournament | Winning score | Margin of victory | Runner(s)-up |
|---|---|---|---|---|---|
| 1 | Mar 12, 1956 | Pensacola Open | −13 (72-69-65-69=275) | 2 strokes | (United States) Bo Wininger |
| 2 | Aug 21, 1960 | St. Paul Open Invitational | −22 (66-68-65-67=266) | 2 strokes | (United States) Billy Casper, (United States) Lionel Hebert |
| 3 | May 19, 1963 | Oklahoma City Open Invitational | −8 (72-71-68-69=280) | 1 stroke | (United States) Julius Boros |

PGA Tour playoff record (0–1)

| No. | Year | Tournament | Opponent | Result |
|---|---|---|---|---|
| 1 | 1959 | Kansas City Open Invitational | (United States) Dow Finsterwald | Lost to birdie on first extra hole |
