= Ron Prichard =

American golf course designer and restorer

- Occupation: Golf course architect

Ron Prichard (born 1945 or 1946) is an American golf course designer and restorer. His original designs include the TPC at Southwind, Memphis, Tennessee, now home of the FedEx St. Jude Classic. However, he is perhaps better known for masterminding the restoration of courses originally created by the Scottish-American designer Donald Ross (1872 – 1948), among them Aronimink Golf Club in Newtown Township, Pennsylvania.

== Career ==
Prichard decided on his career path while in college. "I'd ask myself back then what I wanted to be doing when I was 50," he recalled to one interviewer. "And the answer was a golf architect. I thought it would be nice to be known around the neighborhood." He started his business in the 1960s, and by May 2003 he had designed "nearly 20" courses and restored more than 30 others.

=== Original designs ===
Among his original projects, he was the lead architect for the Tournament Players Club golf course which opened in 1988 at Southwind, Memphis, with golfers Hubert Green and Fuzzy Zoeller as co-consultants. This course has been the home of the FedEx St. Jude Classic (formerly called the Memphis Open) since 1989.

=== Restorations ===
Because of his reputation as a restorer of the works of classic golf course designers such as Donald Ross, Prichard – then a resident of Montgomeryville – was appointed in the 1990s to restore Aronimink Golf Club in Newtown Township, Pennsylvania. This was originally designed by Ross but underwent numerous modifications in the 1980s under Robert Trent Jones, an influential architect but one whose approach to golf course design was later felt to be incompatible with Ross's. The restorations achieved a higher profile when the course was selected to host the Senior PGA Championship for 2003. Prichard's changes, only commenced after a year of planning during which he inspected the course and old photographs, included restoring Ross's original bunkering and expanding the fairways. Aronimink's rise on Golf Digest's list of the 100 greatest American courses rose from 98th position in 2001 to 52nd the following year was credited to Prichard's restoration work.

A similar challenge – recovering a Ross design from beneath numerous later modifications – was posed by Jeffersonville Golf Club in Pennsylvania, requiring Prichard to make use of historical sources including 1930s aerial photographs. The restoration project he headed at The Minikahda Club in Minneapolis, Minnesota, another Ross original, was praised by the Seattle Post-Intelligencer in 2007 as "a huge success, as the course now moves into the 21st century". One restoration project outside the United States was at Elmhurst Golf & Country Club at Winnipeg, Canada, which the club hoped would help to make it a venue for the Canadian Open.

Ron Whitten, writing in GolfWorld in 2007, was critical of the attempts of many planners to return Donald Ross's courses to original designs, calling such restoration "the narrow-minded substitute for imagination". However, he listed Prichard as among "[t]he best architects who specialize in Ross recoveries", understanding the need for course design to change with the times.
