= TPC Southwind =

Private golf club in Tennessee

- Location in the United States Location in Tennessee
- 35.057°N 89.779°W

Club information
- Location: Memphis, Tennessee U.S.
- Elevation: 350 feet (110 m)
- Established: 1988; 38 years ago
- Type: Private
- Operator: PGA Tour TPC Network
- Total holes: 18
- Tournaments: FedEx St. Jude Classic (1989–2018); WGC-FedEx St. Jude Invitational (2019–2021); FedEx St. Jude Championship (2022–present)
- Greens: Champion Bermuda
- Fairways: Meyer Zoysia
- Website: Official website
- Designed by: Ron Prichard
- Par: 70
- Length: 7,244 yards (6,624 m)
- Course rating: 75.6
- Slope rating: 149
- Course record: 61 – Jay Delsing (1993), Bob Estes (2001), Tom Lewis (2020), Justin Rose (2023), Scottie Scheffler (2026)

TPC Southwind is a private golf club in Shelby County, Tennessee, southern United States, located within the gated community of Southwind in southeast Memphis.

East-southeast of central Memphis, the 18-hole championship golf course was designed by Ron Prichard, in consultation with tour pros Hubert Green and Fuzzy Zoeller. TPC Southwind opened in 1988, and is a member of the Tournament Players Club network operated by the PGA Tour. It is near the world headquarters of FedEx, adjacent to the west.

== PGA Tour ==
TPC Southwind was the venue for the tour's annual FedEx St. Jude Classic, formerly the Memphis Open, for three decades (1989–2018). The event was previously played at Colonial Country Club in Cordova. TPC Southwind was renovated following the 2004 event.

In 2019, FedEx took over sponsorship of the WGC Invitational and relocated it to Memphis, played at TPC Southwind in late July. The WGC event continued the charitable relationship with St. Jude Children's Research Hospital, and was renamed WGC-FedEx St. Jude Invitational. For the 2022 season, the WGC Invitational was discontinued, and the first FedEx Cup playoff event was relocated to TPC Southwind with FedEx as the new title sponsor and became the FedEx St. Jude Championship, played in mid-August.

== Course ==
The course length for the first PGA Tour event was 7,006 yards (6,406 m) in 1989, and has played at 7,244 yards (6,624 m) since 2005, except in 2007 and 2008, when it was five yards shorter. With 94 bunkers and ten water hazards, TPC Southwind was ranked ninth in difficulty out of 51 courses on the PGA Tour in 2011. Hole #14 at 239 yards (219 m) consistently ranks as one of the toughest par 3's on the PGA Tour.

=== Grass Types ===
TPC Southwind has multiple varieties of grass to maintain playing conditions on the course.

- Tees and Fairways: Zoysia grass
- Greens: Champion Bermuda Grass
- Rough: Bermuda Grass

=== Course record ===
The course record is 61, achieved three times professionally in the St. Jude Classic. Jay Delsing carded his in the fourth round in 1993 and tied for eighth place. Bob Estes shot his 61 in the first round in 2001, and held on to win the event by a stroke., and Scottie Scheffler in the second round of 2026. Estes also has the only hole-in-one at the 14th hole in the tour event, aced in 2002. Amateur golfer Braden Thornberry also shot the score 61 in a local junior event in August 2012.

== Scorecard ==
TPC Southwind
Tee	Rating/Slope	1	2	3	4	5	6	7	8	9	Out	10	11	12	13	14	15	16	17	18	In	Total
PGA Tour	75.6 / 149 Par 70	434	401	554	196	485	445	482	178	457	3632	465	162	406	472	239	395	530	490	453	3612	7244
Tournament	73.3 / 146 Par 71	405	385	520	170	525	425	428	164	425	3447	441	141	370	425	195	350	496	450	438	3306	6753
Players	71.0 / 133 Par 71	375	351	495	158	475	393	400	159	408	3214	396	127	329	398	176	344	460	400	413	3043	6257
Blended	69.4 / 130 Par 71	337C	351P	495P	146C	475P	365C	360C	159P	373C	3061	382C	127P	329P	398P	142C	305C	460P	400P	378C	2921	5982
Club	M: 68.5 / 123 L: 74.6 / 132 Par 71	337	316	438	146	451	365	360	146	373	2932	382	117	290	337	142	305	445	372	378	2768	5700
Par		4	4	5	3	4/5	4	4	3	4	35/36	4/5	3	4	4	3	4	5	4	4	35/36
SI	Men's	3	15	5	11	13	9	7	17	1		6	16	10	18	8	12	14	2	4
SI	Ladies'	7	15	1	11	5	9	13	17	3		4	18	14	16	12	10	6	2	8
Forward	71.3 / 131 Par 72	299	292	416	103	433	336	340	131	329	2679	374	93	234	298	105	278	376	372	300	2430	5109
Family		167	180	242	90	230	131	122	118	155	1435	139	67	122	182	71	218	235	170	151	1355	2790

- The PGA Tour's FedEx St. Jude Classic used the Tournament tees in June 2012, with 3 yards added to hole #11.
