= Meadowbrook Country Club =

County club in Northville, Michigan

Coordinates: 42.437°N 83.447°W

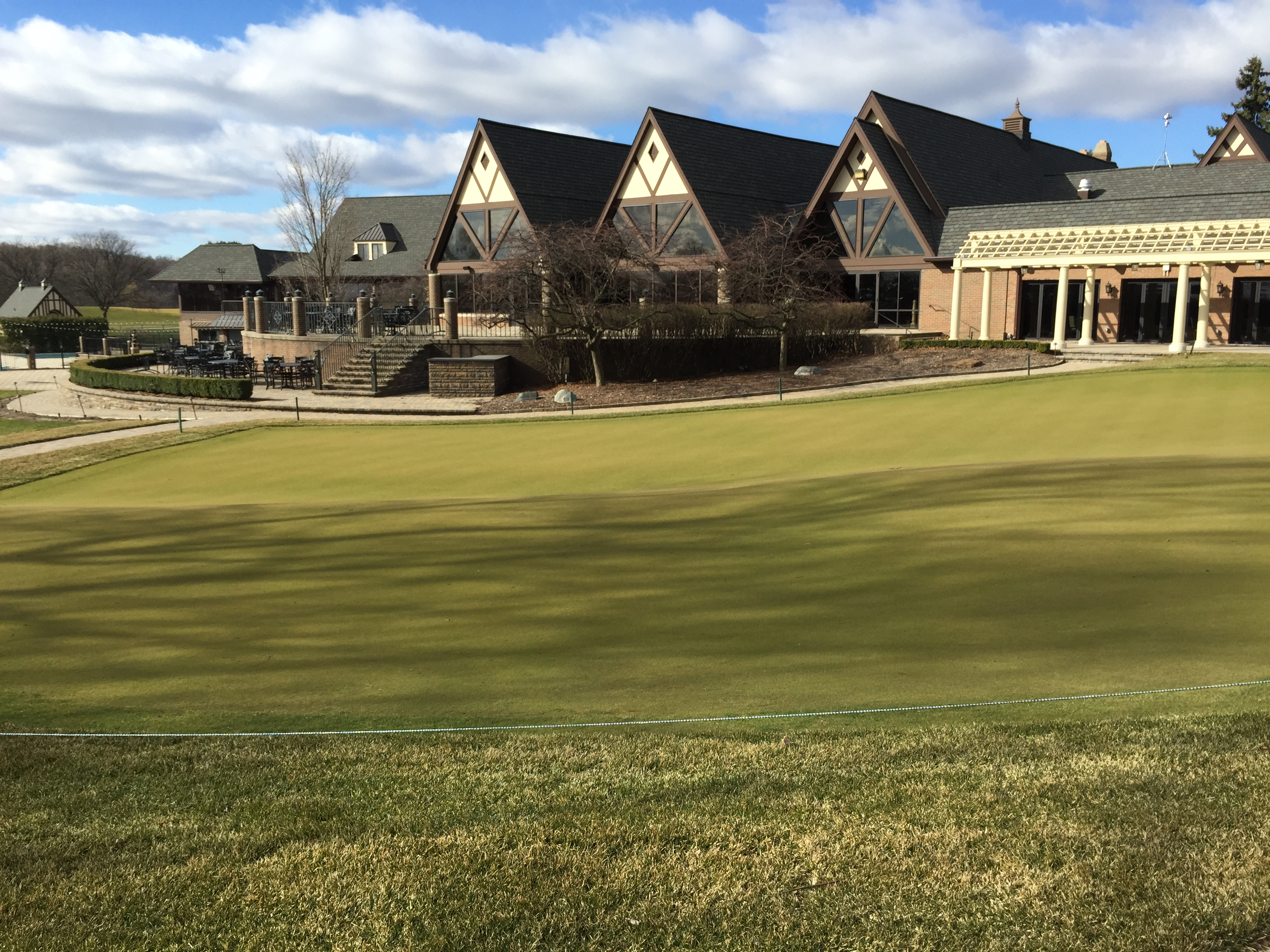
Meadowbrook Country Club

Meadowbrook Country Club is a country club in Northville Township, Wayne County, near Northville, Michigan. The idea for Meadowbrook Country Club, a private golf and social club, came about in 1916 when 23 Northville businessmen purchased 125 acres (0.51 km^{2}) of the Fred C. Cochran Farm. The club was named after a brook, which ran through the property. Its golf course hosted the PGA Championship in 1955, won by Doug Ford. Willie Park, Jr is credited with designing the original Meadowbrook 6-hole course which are present-day holes #10, #11, #7, #2, #3, and #18.

Meadowbrook has hosted The Motor City Open which was a PGA Tour event played at various clubs in and around Detroit from the late 1940s to the early 1960s. The PGA Tour record for the longest sudden-death playoff was established at the 1949 Motor City Open, played at Meadowbrook. Cary Middlecoff and Lloyd Mangrum played 11 holes at Meadowbrook Country Club and were still stalemated when darkness arrived. Tournament officials, with the players mutual consent, declared them co-winners.

Meadowbrook hosted the Motor City Open in 1948, 1949, 1954, and 1959. Winners in those years were:

- 1959 Mike Souchak
- 1954 Cary Middlecoff
- 1949 Cary Middlecoff, Lloyd Mangrum (co-winners)
- 1948 Ben Hogan

== Meadowbrook's early histories ==
An early history was written in 1954 by the club historian, William H. "Uncle Bill" Aston. Members of Meadowbrook's Historical Committee believe the original was published in the program for the 1955 US Open. Aston's history exists in several similar, but not identical, iterations. The best version hangs in a frame over the fireplace near the Centennial Dining Room at Meadowbrook Country Club.

Another history was written by Jim Frantz. He caddied at Meadowbrook Country Club from 1922 to 1931. He then moved away and did not return until about 1980. He played the course and then wrote to the club sharing his memory of the early days and compared the course as it existed then with what he found in 1980. His thoughts were published in the February 1981 edition of "Forward Press", the club's magazine for members. He also donated the water fountain next to the caddie door at the first tee. A plaque over the fountain memorializes his gift.
