= Shelley Mayfield =

American golf course architect and golfer

Personal information
- Nationality: United States
- Born: June 19, 1924 Liberty Hill, Texas, U.S.
- Died: March 22, 2010 (aged 85) San Antonio, Texas, U.S.
- Height: 6 ft 0 in (1.83 m)
- Weight: 175 lb (79 kg; 12.5 st)

Career
- Sport: Golf
- Turned professional: 1948
- Former tour: PGA Tour
- Professional wins: 5

Number of wins by tour
- PGA Tour: 3
- Other: 2

Best results in major championships
- Masters Tournament: T8: 1956
- PGA Championship: T3: 1955
- U.S. Open: T6: 1954
- The Open Championship: DNP

Shelley Mayfield (June 19, 1924 – March 22, 2010) was an American golf course architect and professional golfer who played on the PGA Tour in the 1950s.

== Early life ==
In 1924, Mayfield was born in Liberty Hill, Texas near Austin. He grew up in Seguin near San Antonio.

Mayfield was a star athlete in several sports at Seguin High School including golf, which he began playing at age 14. His team won several state championships under coach W.A. "Lefty" Stackhouse.

== Professional career ==
Mayfield became a golf professional at the age of 24. Like most professional golfers of his generation, he earned his living primarily as a club pro. His first job was as an assistant for Claude Harmon at Winged Foot Golf Club in Mamaroneck, New York, a position he held for two years. The two later worked together at Seminole Golf Club in Florida for one year. He served as the head professional at Rockaway Hunting Club in Cedarhurst, New York from 1950 to 1952. In 1955, Mayfield went to work at the exclusive Meadowbrook Golf and Polo Club on Long Island, where he stayed until 1963. He then became the head club pro at Brook Hollow Country Club in Dallas until 1982 when he retired.

Mayfield won three PGA Tour events during his career. He had two top-10 finishes in major championships, T-6 at the 1954 U.S.Open and T-8 at the 1956 Masters Tournament. He also reached the semi-final of the 1955 PGA Championship, having reached the quarter-final the previous year.

Courses that Mayfield helped design, most as a partner with famed course architect Dick Wilson, included the Doral Country Club and Pine Tree Golf Club in Florida and California's Bay Hill Golf Club and La Costa Country Club. Giving back to the town where he learned to play the game, he designed the back-nine added to the course at Max Starcke Park in Seguin, Texas.

== Personal life ==
Mayfield retired to his ranch in Carrizo Springs, Texas. He died in San Antonio, Texas at the age of 85.

== Awards and honors ==
In 1992, Mayfield was elected to the Texas Golf Hall of Fame.

== Professional wins (5) ==
=== PGA Tour wins (3) ===
No.	Date	Tournament	Winning score	Margin of victory	Runner(s)-up
1	Jul 19, 1953	St. Paul Open	−19 (69-67-68-65=269)	2 strokes	(United States) Dutch Harrison
2	Jan 31, 1955	Thunderbird Invitational	−18 (63-70-68-69=270)	Playoff	(United States) Fred Haas, (United States) Mike Souchak
3	Mar 4, 1956	Baton Rouge Open	−11 (67-71-70-69=277)	3 strokes	(United States) Walter Burkemo, (United States) Jimmy Demaret, (United States) Doug Ford, (United States) Fred Haas, (United States) Fred Hawkins

PGA Tour playoff record (1–1)

No.	Year	Tournament	Opponents	Result
1	1953	Houston Open	(Australia) Jim Ferrier, (United States) Cary Middlecoff, (United States) Bill Nary, (United States) Earl Stewart	Middlecoff won 18-hole playoff; Middlecoff: −3 (69), Ferrier: −1 (71), Mayfield: −1 (71), Stewart: E (72), Nary: +3 (75)
2	1955	Thunderbird Invitational	(United States) Fred Haas, (United States) Mike Souchak	Won with birdie on second extra hole after 18-hole playoff; Mayfield: −3 (69), Souchak: −3 (69), Haas: −2 (70)

=== Other wins (2) ===
this list is probably incomplete

- 1954 San Francisco Open
- 1957 Long Island Open

== Results in major championships ==
Tournament	1953	1954	1955	1956	1957	1958	1959	1960	1961	1962	1963	1964	1965
Masters Tournament			T36	T8	CUT								
U.S. Open	T33	T6	T12	T29	CUT		T35	CUT		CUT			WD
PGA Championship		QF	SF	R32	R64			T32	T22	T30	T53		

Note: Mayfield never played in The Open Championship.

Top 10
Did not play

WD = withdrew
CUT = missed the half-way cut
R64, R32, R16, QF, SF = round in which player lost in PGA Championship match play
"T" indicates a tie for a place
