= Thunderbird Invitational =

Golf tournament

Coordinates: 33.756°N 116.43°W

Tournament information
- Location: Rancho Mirage, California
- Established: 1953
- Course: Thunderbird Country Club
- Par: 71
- Length: 6,680 yards (6,110 m)
- Tour: PGA Tour
- Format: Stroke play
- Prize fund: US$15,000
- Month played: January
- Final year: 1959

Tournament record score
- Aggregate: 266 Arnold Palmer (1959)
- To par: −20 Fred Haas (1954)

Final champion
- (United States) Arnold Palmer
- Location in the United States Location in California

The Thunderbird Invitational was a professional golf tournament on the PGA Tour, played from 1952 to 1959 in Rancho Mirage, California. Held in late January at Thunderbird Country Club, the tournament's purse was a modest $15,000; it was the direct predecessor of the Desert Classic, which began in 1960. Thunderbird hosted the Ryder Cup in 1955.

Arnold Palmer, 29, was the event's final champion in 1959; he won the next year at the first edition of the "Palm Springs Desert Classic," which had a $100,000 purse and a winner's share of 12,000, his largest tour check to date.

Ken Venturi, 26, won the 1958 event and was awarded a $1,500 check and a $4,500 automobile. He backed it up with another win the following week at Phoenix.

Jimmy Demaret won the event three times; his first was a 54-hole midweek event in 1953, and the last was an 18-hole playoff on Monday in 1957 for consecutive titles.

The 1952 event was a 36 hole pro-am, played midweek. Dutch Harrison won the best-ball while Jim Ferrier and Cary Middlecoff had the best professional scores.

== Winners ==
Year	Winner	Score	To par	Margin of victory	Runner(s)-up	Winner's share ($)	Ref.
1959	(United States) Arnold Palmer	266	−18	3 strokes	(United States) Jimmy Demaret (United States) Ken Venturi	1,500	
1958	(United States) Ken Venturi	269	−15	4 strokes	(United States) Jimmy Demaret (United States) Gene Littler	1,500	
1957	(United States) Jimmy Demaret (3)	273	−11	Playoff	(United States) Mike Souchak (United States) Ken Venturi	2,000	
1956	(United States) Jimmy Demaret (2)	269	−15	1 stroke	(United States) Cary Middlecoff	2,000	
1955	(United States) Shelley Mayfield	270	−18	Playoff	(United States) Fred Haas (United States) Mike Souchak	2,000	
1954	(United States) Fred Haas	268	−20	2 strokes	(United States) Marty Furgol (United States) Chandler Harper (United States) Bo Wininger	2,000	
1953	(United States) Jimmy Demaret	201	−15	2 strokes	(United States) Ben Hogan (United States) Lloyd Mangrum (United States) Jim Turnesa	1,500	

== Playoffs ==
In 1953 it was over 54 holes, midweek. In 1955 Mayfield won with a birdie on second extra hole after 18-hole playoff. Mayfield and Souchak scored 69, Haas 70. In 1957 Demaret won after an 18-hole playoff, scoring 67, Souchak scored 75 and Venturi 76.
