= 1957 PGA Championship =

Coordinates: 39.792°N 84.242°W

Tournament information
- Dates: July 17–21, 1957
- Location: Dayton, Ohio
- Course: Miami Valley Golf Club
- Organized by: PGA of America
- Tour: PGA Tour
- Format: Match play - 7 rounds

Statistics
- Par: 71
- Length: 6,773 yards (6,193 m)
- Field: 128 players (all match play)
- Prize fund: $42,100
- Winner's share: $8,000

Champion
- (United States) Lionel Hebert
- def. Dow Finsterwald, 2 and 1

Location in the United States
Location in Ohio

The 1957 PGA Championship was the 39th PGA Championship, held July 17–21 at Miami Valley Golf Club in Dayton, Ohio. In the last PGA Championship played under the match play format, Lionel Hebert won 2 and 1 over Dow Finsterwald, who won the following year, the first as a 72-hole stroke play event.

Defending champion Jack Burke Jr. lost in the second round to Milon Marusic, 2 and 1.

At the time, it was not yet known that this was the last at match play, the decision to switch to stroke play was announced during the November meetings.

The Open Championship was held two weeks earlier in Scotland at St Andrews; neither Hebert nor Finsterwald played in 1957 (or ever).

== Format ==
The match play format at the PGA Championship in 1957 called for nine rounds (162 holes) in five days. As in 1956, the two-day stroke play qualifying segment (36 holes) was eliminated; 128 players were entered in the single-elimination bracket. The PGA Championship had concluded on Tuesday since 1947; this year's schedule was modified for a Sunday final, with match play beginning on Wednesday. The first five rounds were 18-hole matches contested over the first three days, which reduced the field to four players for the weekend. The semifinals and finals were 36-hole matches played on the final two days, Saturday and Sunday.

- Wednesday – first round, 18 holes
- Thursday – second and third rounds, 18 holes each
- Friday – fourth round and quarterfinals, 18 holes each
- Saturday – semifinals – 36 holes
- Sunday – final – 36 holes

Consolation matches at 18 holes were held on the weekend to determine third to eighth places.

== Final results ==
Sunday, July 21, 1957

Place	Player	Money ($)
1	(United States) Lionel Hebert	8,000
2	(United States) Dow Finsterwald	5,000
3	(United States) Walter Burkemo	3,500
4	(United States) Don Whitt	3,000
5	(United States) Dick Mayer	2,500
6	(United States) Claude Harmon	2,000
7	(United States) Jay Hebert	1,500
8	(United States) Charles Sheppard	1,000

== Final eight bracket ==
In the 18-hole quarterfinals Friday, a clash of the Hebert brothers was avoided when Walter Burkemo defeated Jay Hebert 2&1, while Lionel Hebert defeated Claude Harmon by the same score. On the other side of the bracket, Dow Finsterwald defeated Charles Sheppard, 2 up, and Don Whitt defeated Dick Mayer, 2&1. In the 36-hole semifinals on Saturday, Finsterwald defeated Whitt, 2 up, and Hebert prevailed over Burkemo, 3&1.

The final match on Sunday was all-square after the first 18 holes in the morning. Hebert won the first three holes in the afternoon with birdies, but the match was back to all square after thirty holes. Hebert birdied the next three and Finsterwald matched two of them, but then bogeyed the 34th and was two down with two to play; the par-3 35th was halved with pars to end the match. Hebert earned $8,000 for the victory and Finsterwald received $5,000 as runner-up. Burkemo, the 1953 champion, defeated Whitt 3&1 to claim third place and $3,500. Finsterwald captured the title the following year in the new stroke play format; Hebert's older brother Jay won in 1960.

Quarter-finals; July 19
Lionel Hebert	2&1
Claude Harmon
Walter Burkemo	2&1
Jay Hebert
Dow Finsterwald	2up
Charles Sheppard
Don Whitt	2&1
Dick Mayer

Semi-finals; July 20
Lionel Hebert	3&1
Walter Burkemo
Dow Finsterwald	2up
Don Whitt

Finals; July 21
Lionel Hebert	2&1
Dow Finsterwald
Third place
Walter Burkemo	3&1
Don Whitt

=== Consolation brackets ===
Consolation match July 20
Claude Harmon	20h
Jay Hebert
Charles Sheppard
Dick Mayer	2&1

Fifth place July 21
Claude Harmon
Dick Mayer	w/o
Seventh place
Jay Hebert	5&3
Charles Sheppard

== Final match scorecards ==
Morning

Hole	1	2	3	4	5	6	7	8	9	10	11	12	13	14	15	16	17	18
Par	5	4	5	4	3	4	4	3	4	4	4	4	3	4	5	4	3	4
(United States) Hebert	4	4	6	4	3	4	4	3	3	3	4	4	3	4	5	4	3	4
(United States) Finsterwald	4	4	4	4	3	4	4	4	4	3	4	3	3	4	5	3	3	4
Leader	–	–	F1	F1	F1	F1	F1	–	H1	H1	H1	H1	H1	H1	H1	–	–	–

Afternoon

Hole	1	2	3	4	5	6	7	8	9	10	11	12	13	14	15	16	17	18
Par	5	4	5	4	3	4	4	3	4	4	4	4	3	4	5	4	3	4
(United States) Hebert	4	3	4	4	4	4	4	3	4	4	4	5	2	3	4	4	3	
(United States) Finsterwald	5	4	5	3	3	4	4	3	4	4	4	4	3	3	4	5	3	
Leader	H1	H2	H3	H2	H1	H1	H1	H1	H1	H1	H1	–	H1	H1	H1	H2	H2	

Birdie	Bogey
