= Minneapolis Golf Club =

Golf club in St. Louis Park, Minnesota

Coordinates: 44°57′51″N 93°23′43″W

Minneapolis Golf Club is a golf club located in St. Louis Park, Minnesota, a suburb of Minneapolis, Minnesota. Designed by Willie Park, Jr. and Donald Ross, the Minneapolis golf course opened in 1916. The club hosted the U.S. Amateur in 1950 as well as the PGA Championship in 1959, which Bob Rosburg won.

== Club history ==
In 1916, there were only two golf clubs in Minneapolis, The Minikahda Club and Interlachen Country Club. In early 1916, five members of the Minneapolis Athletic Club set plans to establish another golf club to meet the growing popularity of the game. By July, the Minneapolis Golf Club ("MGC") was incorporated. Land was acquired and nine holes were built on the site of present-day Golden Valley Country Club The opening of play at MGC commenced on the first Saturday of August 1916. Later that year, the club was approached by Hyland Homes Company to consider the purchase of a larger piece of intact farmland in St. Louis Park. The Scottish architect Willie Park Jr. had been retained to lay out the golf course. On December 9, 1916, the MGC membership voted to relocate to the present location. By June 19, 1917, MGC had become one of the earliest member clubs of the Minnesota Golf Association.

By 1918, MGC had 400 members and there was a regular shuttle service to and from the Minneapolis Athletic Club operating during the golf season. In September 1919, plans were initiated to build a new clubhouse to accommodate the now larger membership. The original clubhouse was a converted four-room farmhouse located near the present third tee. The new clubhouse was to be built on the northern section of the property. It opened on May 12, 1923. The rolling farmland our course was built on was virtually void of trees except for a stand of oaks in the northern section by today's 10th and 11th holes. The trees that line the fairways today were planted during a tree-planting program in 1930.

== Course architects ==
Two Scots, Willie Park, Jr. (1864–1925) of Musselburgh and Donald J. Ross (1872–1948) of Dornoch, at different times designed and routed the golf course. On November 26, 1916, The Minneapolis Tribune wrote, "Willie Park, well known golf course architect, arrived yesterday to lay out the course of the Minneapolis Golf Club". Discovered field notes of the original land survey firm show that Park routed the course in early December 1916. Ross' involvement is demonstrated thorough a routing plan of the course executed by Donald J. Ross Associates, Inc. in 1920 that was found by the Chair of the History Committee of the Donald Ross Society in 2011. The two routings are framed and displayed within the clubhouse. In 2019, golf architect Jeff Mingay led a restoration of the golf course design in conjunction with construction specialist Duininck Golf.

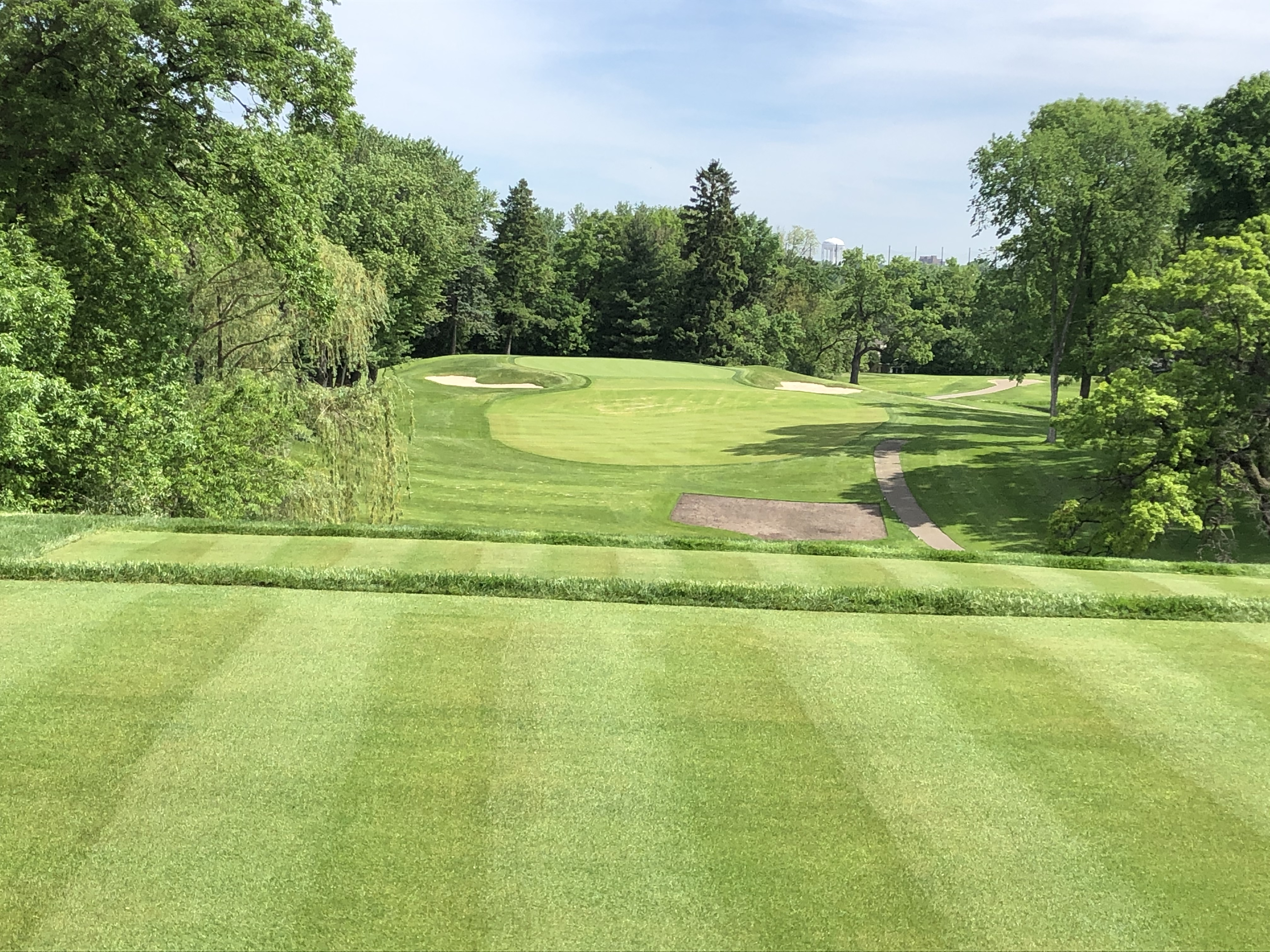
Minneapolis Golf Club, 2020 post restoration

== Golf events ==
In 1940, after Sam Snead played an exhibition match at MGC, he said that he "hoped that (MGC) would some day host a U.S. Open". The most prestigious amateur event was the Golden Anniversary (50th) U.S. Amateur in 1950. As result of holding the 1959 PGA Championship at MGC, the club is in elite company as one of only 120 golf clubs in the world to have hosted a Grand Slam event (Masters, U.S. Open, British Open, and PGA) since 1860.

== Championships ==
National professional events:

- PGA Championship (1) 1959
- Dayton's Challenge (6) 1995, 1996, 1997, 1998, 1999, 2000

National amateur events:

- U.S. Amateur (1) 1950
- Western Amateur (1) 1940

Minnesota amateur events:

- MGA Junior Championship (1) 1924
- MGA Senior Championship (2) 1962, 1975
- MGA 4-Ball Championship (1) 1976
- MGA Amateur Championship (6) 1925, 1936, 1953, 1988, 2007, 2023
- MGA Senior 4-Ball Championship (3) 1971, 1982, 1990
- MWGA Match Play Championships (7) 1924, 1931, 1951, 1958, 1968, 1978, 1990

Minnesota professional events:

- Minnesota State Open (6) 1924, 1927, 1932, 1944, 1957, 1975
- Minnesota Section PGA (1) 1971
- Minnesota Golf Champions (26) 1975–2000

== Pool drain accident ==
On June 29, 2007, a six-year-old child, Abigail Taylor, was seriously injured when she sat on an uncovered drain within the wading pool. The drain cover had fallen off because it had been attached with improper fasteners in a worn mounting ring. The powerful suction from the recirculation pump ruptured and removed a large portion of Taylor's digestive tract. She was given a new small bowel, liver, and pancreas in an organ transplant operation at the University of Nebraska Medical Center in late 2007. Despite the transplant, she died on March 20, 2008, just two months short of her seventh birthday. The club eventually reached an $8 million settlement with the family.
