= Buick Open =

Golf tournament formerly on the PGA Tour

Tournament information
- Location: Grand Blanc, Michigan
- Established: 1958
- Course: Warwick Hills Golf and Country Club
- Par: 72
- Length: 7,085 yards (6,479 m)
- Tour: PGA Tour
- Format: Stroke play
- Prize fund: US$5,100,000
- Month played: July/August
- Final year: 2009

Tournament record score
- Aggregate: 262 Robert Wrenn (1987)
- To par: −26 as above

Final champion
- (United States) Tiger Woods
- Location in the United States Location in Michigan

The Buick Open was a PGA Tour golf tournament from 1958 to 2009. In 2007, the tournament was held at the end of June, a change from its traditional spot between The Open Championship and the PGA Championship. Regardless, many prominent players used it as a "tune-up" for the subsequent major.

For the event's first decade, the Buick Open Invitational was played at Warwick Hills Golf and Country Club in Grand Blanc, Michigan. After 1969, professional golf events in the area fell off the PGA Tour schedule and a series of pro-ams and other similarly unofficial events took place, mostly at Flint Golf Club in Flint, Michigan.

Flint native, and PGA touring professional Larry Mancour had returned to Michigan to play in the Buick Open and stayed to build the Grand Blanc Golf Club. He then added nine holes at the Flint Elks Golf Club where he remained the professional for 20 years. He rescued the Buick Open when General Motors dropped sponsorship of the tournament. With local Buick dealers Mancour started the Little Buick Open in 1969. It drew players and fans and led to the rebirth of the Buick Open in 1977.

The Buick Open officially made its return to the PGA Tour in 1977 at the Flint Elks Club, and in 1978 the event returned to Warwick Hills G&CC, where it remained until its demise.

The Associated Press reported July 28, 2009, that General Motors would end its sponsorship of the Buick Open after the 2009 tournament, in order to devote its marketing resources to cars and trucks. The PGA Tour replaced the tournament with the Greenbrier Classic at The Greenbrier in White Sulphur Springs, West Virginia.

As in the 1970s, a series of pro-ams and other unofficial events now take place in Grand Blanc, with the AJGA's Randy Wise Open taking place at Warwick Hills and most pro-ams and a golf festival at the Jewel of Grand Blanc (the former Grand Blanc Golf Club).

In 2014, an unrelated tournament with the same name was started in China. The event is played on PGA Tour China.

In 2018, the former General Motors financing arm, now Ally Bank, returned to Warwick Hills to sponsor a PGA Tour Champions event, The Ally Challenge. Jim Furyk (2003, 2020) and Vijay Singh (2004, 2005, 2023) have won both events.

In 2019, the PGA Tour returned to Michigan with what is now the Rocket Classic, which is played at the Detroit Golf Club.

== Long hitters ==
In its final years, the tournament was dominated by long hitters. Tiger Woods, Vijay Singh, Brian Bateman, and Kenny Perry combined for eight wins in its final nine years. Several other players ranked highly in driving distance finished second during that span, including Woods, Jason Gore, Geoff Ogilvy, Bubba Watson, and John Daly.

== Winners ==
Year	Tour (Note: PGAT − PGA Tour.)	Winner	Score	To par	Margin of victory	Runner(s)-up	Winner's share ($)
Buick Open
2009	PGAT	(United States) Tiger Woods (3)	268	−20	3 strokes	(Australia) Greg Chalmers (Australia) John Senden (United States) Roland Thatcher	918,000
2008	PGAT	(United States) Kenny Perry (2)	269	−19	1 stroke	(United States) Woody Austin (United States) Bubba Watson	900,000
2007	PGAT	(United States) Brian Bateman	273	−15	1 stroke	(United States) Woody Austin (United States) Jason Gore (United States) Justin Leonard	882,000
2006	PGAT	(United States) Tiger Woods (2)	264	−24	3 strokes	(United States) Jim Furyk	864,000
2005	PGAT	(Fiji) Vijay Singh (3)	264	−24	4 strokes	(United States) Zach Johnson (United States) Tiger Woods	828,000
2004	PGAT	(Fiji) Vijay Singh (2)	265	−23	1 stroke	(United States) John Daly	810,000
2003	PGAT	(United States) Jim Furyk	267	−21	2 strokes	(United States) Briny Baird (United States) Chris DiMarco (Australia) Geoff Ogilvy (United States) Tiger Woods	720,000
2002	PGAT	(United States) Tiger Woods	271	−17	4 strokes	(United States) Fred Funk (United States) Brian Gay (United States) Mark O'Meara (Mexico) Esteban Toledo	594,000
2001	PGAT	(United States) Kenny Perry	263	−25	2 strokes	(United States) Chris DiMarco (United States) Jim Furyk	558,000
2000	PGAT	(United States) Rocco Mediate	268	−20	1 stroke	(United States) Chris Perry	486,000
1999	PGAT	(United States) Tom Pernice Jr.	270	−18	1 stroke	(United States) Tom Lehman (United States) Ted Tryba (United States) Bob Tway	432,000
1998	PGAT	(United States) Billy Mayfair	271	−17	2 strokes	(United States) Scott Verplank	324,000
1997	PGAT	(Fiji) Vijay Singh	273	−15	4 strokes	(United States) Tom Byrum (United States) Russ Cochran (South Africa) Ernie Els (United States) Brad Fabel (Japan) Naomichi Ozaki (United States) Curtis Strange	270,000
1996	PGAT	(United States) Justin Leonard	266	−22	5 strokes	(United States) Chip Beck	216,000
1995	PGAT	(United States) Woody Austin	270	−18	Playoff	(United States) Mike Brisky	216,000
1994	PGAT	(United States) Fred Couples	270	−18	2 strokes	(United States) Corey Pavin	198,000
1993	PGAT	(United States) Larry Mize	272	−16	1 stroke	(United States) Fuzzy Zoeller	180,000
1992	PGAT	(United States) Dan Forsman	276	−12	Playoff	(Australia) Steve Elkington (United States) Brad Faxon	180,000
1991	PGAT	(United States) Brad Faxon	271	−17	Playoff	(United States) Chip Beck	180,000
1990	PGAT	(United States) Chip Beck	272	−16	1 stroke	(United States) Mike Donald (United States) Hale Irwin (United States) Fuzzy Zoeller	180,000
1989	PGAT	(United States) Leonard Thompson	273	−15	1 stroke	(United States) Billy Andrade (United States) Payne Stewart (United States) Doug Tewell	180,000
1988	PGAT	(United States) Scott Verplank	268	−20	2 strokes	(United States) Doug Tewell	126,000
1987	PGAT	(United States) Robert Wrenn	262	−26	7 strokes	(United States) Dan Pohl	108,000
1986	PGAT	(United States) Ben Crenshaw	270	−18	1 stroke	(United States) J. C. Snead (United States) Doug Tewell	90,000
1985	PGAT	(United States) Ken Green	268	−20	4 strokes	(Australia) Wayne Grady	81,000
1984	PGAT	(Zimbabwe) Denis Watson	271	−17	1 stroke	(United States) Payne Stewart	72,000
1983	PGAT	(United States) Wayne Levi	272	−16	1 stroke	(Japan) Isao Aoki (United States) Calvin Peete	63,000
1982	PGAT	(United States) Lanny Wadkins	273	−15	1 stroke	(United States) Tom Kite	63,000
1981	PGAT	(United States) Hale Irwin	277	−11	Playoff	(United States) Bobby Clampett (United States) Peter Jacobsen (United States) Gil Morgan	63,000
Buick-Goodwrench Open
1980	PGAT	(United States) Peter Jacobsen	276	−12	1 stroke	(United States) Billy Kratzert (United States) Mark Lye	45,000
1979	PGAT	(United States) John Fought	280	−8	Playoff	(United States) Jim Simons	27,000
1978	PGAT	(Australia) Jack Newton	280	−8	Playoff	(United States) Mike Sullivan	20,000
Buick Open
1977	PGAT	(South Africa) Bobby Cole	271	−17	1 stroke	(United States) Fred Marti	20,000
1976		(United States) Ed Sabo	279	−9	Playoff	(United States) Randy Erskine	12,000
1975		(United States) Spike Kelley	208	−8	1 stroke	(United States) Randy Erskine (United States) Jim Marshall (United States) Mike McCullough	4,200
Flint Elks Open
1974		(United States) Bryan Abbott	136	−8	Playoff	(United States) Joe Porter	2,000
Lake Michigan Classic
1973		(Canada) Wilf Homenuik	215	−1	Playoff	(United States) Jim Ferriell	3,200
Vern Parsell Buick Open
1972		(United States) Gary Groh	273	−15	2 strokes	(United States) John Mahaffey	4,000
Buick Open Invitational
1970–1971: No tournament
1969	PGAT	(United States) Dave Hill	277	−11	2 strokes	(United States) Frank Beard	25,000
1968	PGAT	(United States) Tom Weiskopf	280	−8	1 stroke	(United States) Mike Hill	25,000
1967	PGAT	(United States) Julius Boros (2)	283	−5	3 strokes	(United States) Bob Goalby (United States) R. H. Sikes (United States) Bert Yancey	20,000
1966	PGAT	(United States) Phil Rodgers	284	−4	2 strokes	(United States) Johnny Pott (United States) Kermit Zarley	20,000
1965	PGAT	(United States) Tony Lema (2)	280	−8	2 strokes	(United States) Johnny Pott	20,000
1964	PGAT	(United States) Tony Lema	277	−11	1 stroke	(United States) Dow Finsterwald	8,000
1963	PGAT	(United States) Julius Boros	274	−14	5 strokes	(United States) Dow Finsterwald	9,000
1962	PGAT	(United States) Bill Collins	284	−4	1 stroke	(United States) Dave Ragan	9,000
1961	PGAT	(United States) Jack Burke Jr.	284	−4	Playoff	(United States) Billy Casper (United States) Johnny Pott	9,000
1960	PGAT	(United States) Mike Souchak	282	−6	1 stroke	(United States) Gay Brewer (United States) Art Wall Jr.	9,000
1959	PGAT	(United States) Art Wall Jr.	282	−6	Playoff	(United States) Dow Finsterwald	9,000
1958	PGAT	(United States) Billy Casper	285	−3	1 stroke	(United States) Ted Kroll (United States) Arnold Palmer	9,000
