= Fred Haas =

American golfer (1916–2004)

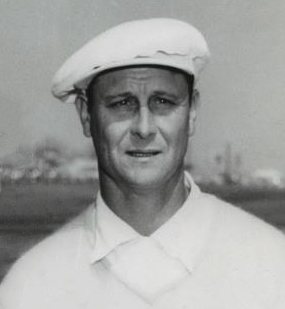
- Haas, c. 1950

Personal information
- Full name: Frederick Theodore Haas Jr.
- Nationality: United States
- Born: January 3, 1916 Portland, Arkansas, U.S.
- Died: January 26, 2004 (aged 88) Metairie, Louisiana, U.S.

Career
- Sport: Golf
- College: Louisiana State University
- Turned professional: 1946
- Former tours: PGA Tour; Champions Tour
- Professional wins: 7

Number of wins by tour
- PGA Tour: 5
- Other: 2

Best results in major championships
- Masters Tournament: T10: 1950
- PGA Championship: T5: 1952
- U.S. Open: T6: 1954
- The Open Championship: CUT: 1966

Frederick Theodore Haas Jr. (January 3, 1916 – January 26, 2004) was an American professional golfer.

== Amateur career ==
Haas was born in Portland, Arkansas. After graduating from Dermott High School, he graduated from Louisiana State University in 1937, winning the NCAA individual championship in his senior year.

== Professional career ==
Haas's first PGA Tour win, at the Memphis Invitational as an amateur, broke Byron Nelson's record streak of 11 straight victories (Nelson finished 4th). He turned pro in early 1946. He played on the 1953 Ryder Cup team.

== Personal life ==
Haas died in Metairie, Louisiana at age 88.

== Amateur wins ==
this list may be incomplete

- 1934 Southern Amateur, Western Junior
- 1935 Western Junior, Chicago District Amateur
- 1936 Canadian Amateur Championship
- 1937 Southern Amateur, NCAA championship

== Professional wins (7) ==
=== PGA Tour wins (5) ===
No.	Date	Tournament	Winning score	Margin of victory	Runner(s)-up
1	Aug 19, 1945	Memphis Invitational (as an amateur)	−18 (69-69-64-68=270)	5 strokes	(United States) Bob Cochran (a), (United States) George Low Jr.
2	Oct 4, 1948	Portland Open Invitational	−18 (67-67-71-65=270)	Playoff	(United States) Ben Hogan (2nd), (United States) Johnny Palmer (3rd)
3	Dec 12, 1949	Miami Open	−16 (65-67-67-65=264)	Playoff	(United States) Bob Hamilton
4	Jan 23, 1950	Long Beach Open	−16 (70-66-67-65=268)	5 strokes	(Canada) Stan Leonard
5	Jan 31, 1954	Thunderbird Invitational	−20 (65-68-66-69=268)	2 strokes	(United States) Marty Furgol, (United States) Chandler Harper, (United States) Bo Wininger

PGA Tour playoff record (2–3)

No.	Year	Tournament	Opponent(s)	Result
1	1947	St. Paul Open	(Australia) Jim Ferrier	Lost 18-hole playoff; Ferrier: −4 (68), Haas: −1 (71)
2	1948	Tacoma Open Invitational	(United States) Chuck Congdon, (United States) Vic Ghezzi, (United States) Cary Middlecoff, (United States) Ed Oliver	Oliver won with eagle on first extra hole after 18-hole playoff; Oliver: −2 (69), Middlecoff: −2 (69), Haas: +1 (72), Congdon: +2 (73), Ghezzi: +4 (75)
3	1948	Portland Open Invitational	(United States) Ben Hogan (2nd), (United States) Johnny Palmer (3rd)	Won 18-hole playoff; Haas: −2 (70), Hogan: −1 (71), Palmer: +2 (75)
4	1949	Miami Open	(United States) Bob Hamilton	Won 18-hole playoff; Haas: −1 (69), Hamilton: +1 (71)
5	1955	Thunderbird Invitational	(United States) Shelley Mayfield, (United States) Mike Souchak	Mayfield won with birdie on second extra hole after 18-hole playoff; Mayfield: −3 (69), Souchak: −3 (69), Haas: −2 (70)

=== Other regular wins (1) ===
- 1959 Louisiana State Open

=== Senior wins (2) ===
No.	Date	Tournament	Winning score	Margin of victory	Runner(s)-up
1	Feb 28, 1966	PGA Seniors' Championship	−2 (72-71-71-72=286)	2 strokes	(United States) John Barnum, (United States) Dutch Harrison
2	Jul 3, 1966	World Senior Championship	3 & 2		(Wales) Dai Rees

== Results in major championships ==
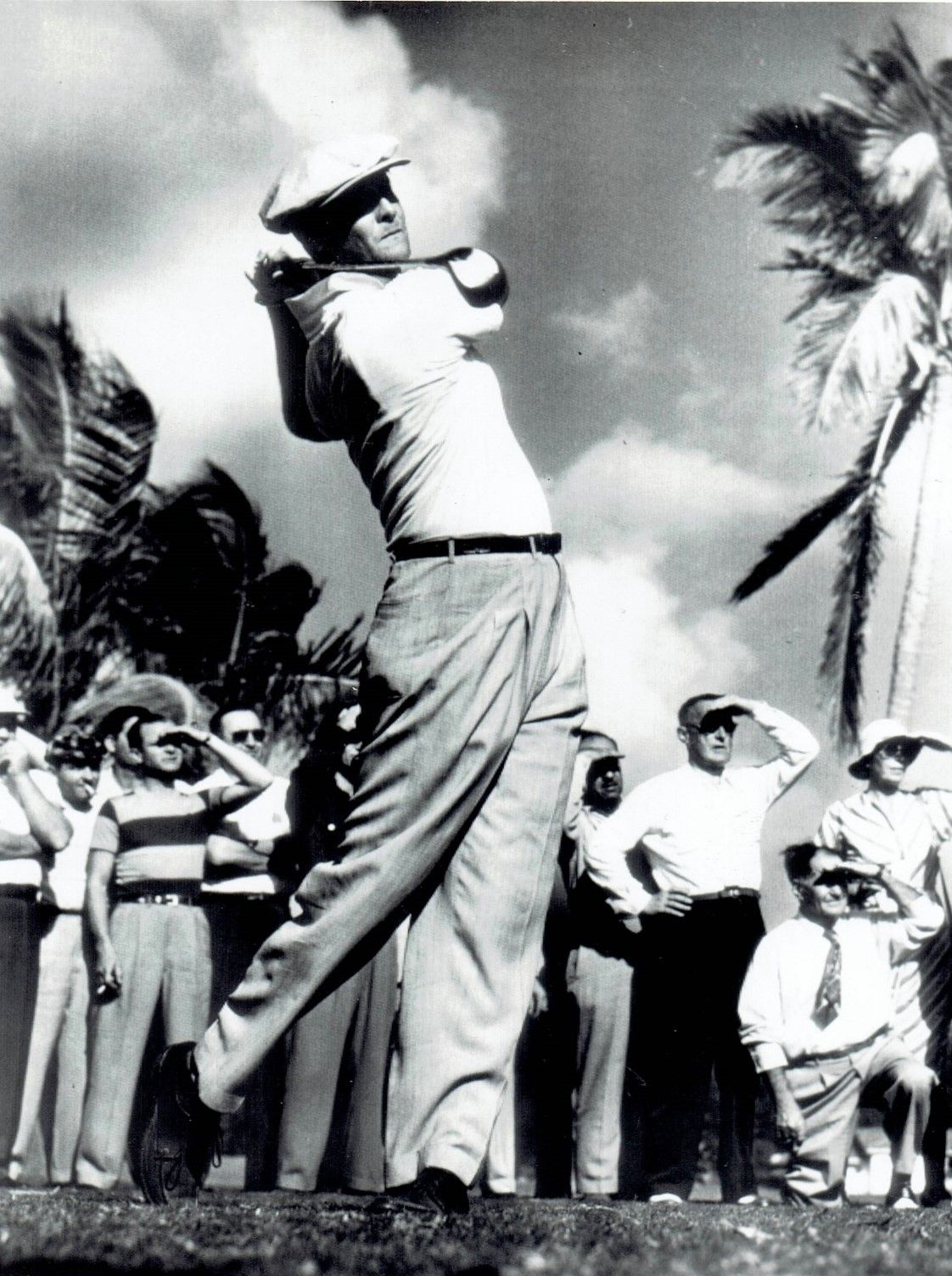
Haas at the 1949 Miami Open, which he won

Amateur

Tournament	1934	1935	1936	1937	1938	1939	1940	1941
U.S. Amateur	R16	QF	R256	R16	R32	R32	R32	R32
The Amateur Championship					R32			

Professional

Tournament	1935	1936	1937	1938	1939
Masters Tournament	T37	WD	WD		
U.S. Open					
The Open Championship					
PGA Championship					

Tournament	1940	1941	1942	1943	1944	1945	1946	1947	1948	1949
Masters Tournament				NT	NT	NT	15	T17	T18	29
U.S. Open		WD	NT	NT	NT	NT	T43	T31		T19
The Open Championship	NT	NT	NT	NT	NT	NT				
PGA Championship				NT						

Tournament	1950	1951	1952	1953	1954	1955	1956	1957	1958	1959
Masters Tournament	T10	T39		26	T33	WD	T29	CUT		
U.S. Open	T18	T29	WD	T12	T6	T34	T14	T35	CUT	
The Open Championship										
PGA Championship		R64	QF	R32	R32	R32	R32			

Tournament	1960	1961	1962	1963	1964	1965	1966	1967	1968	1969
Masters Tournament										
U.S. Open					CUT					
The Open Championship							CUT			
PGA Championship	WD	T50	T23	T27			T37	T51	WD	

Tournament	1970	1971	1972	1973
Masters Tournament				
U.S. Open				
The Open Championship				
PGA Championship			T51	CUT

Top 10
Did not play

NT = no tournament
WD = withdrew
CUT = missed the half-way cut
"T" indicates a tie for a place
R256, R128, R64, R32, R16, QF, SF = round in which player lost in match play

Sources: U.S. Open and U.S. Amateur, 1938 British Amateur

=== Summary ===
Tournament	Wins	2nd	3rd	Top-5	Top-10	Top-25	Events	Cuts made
Masters Tournament	0	0	0	0	1	4	14	10
U.S. Open	0	0	0	0	1	5	14	10
The Open Championship	0	0	0	0	0	0	1	0
PGA Championship	0	0	0	1	1	6	15	12
Totals	0	0	0	1	3	15	44	32

- Most consecutive cuts made – 12 (1946 Masters – 1951 PGA)
- Longest streak of top-10s – 1 (three times)

== U.S. national team appearances ==
Amateur

- Walker Cup: 1938

Professional

- Ryder Cup: 1953 (winners)
