= Kentucky Derby Open =

Golf tournament formerly on the PGA Tour

Coordinates: 38.23°N 85.673°W

Tournament information
- Location: Louisville, Kentucky
- Established: 1957
- Course: Seneca Golf Course
- Par: 71
- Length: 6,542 yards (5,982 m)
- Tour: PGA Tour
- Format: Stroke play
- Prize fund: US$20,000
- Month played: May
- Final year: 1959

Tournament record score
- Aggregate: 274 Gary Player (1958); 274 Don Whitt (1959)
- To par: −14 Gary Player (1958)

Final champion
- (United States) Don Whitt
- Location in the United States Location in Kentucky

The Kentucky Derby Open was a PGA Tour event in Kentucky that was played at Seneca Golf Course in Louisville in the late 1950s. Gary Player won his first PGA Tour event at this tournament in April 1958. Seneca is a municipal course, located just northwest of Bowman Field.

== Winners ==
Year	Winner	Score	To par	Margin of victory	Runner(s)-up	Purse (US$)	Winner's share ($)	Ref.
1959	(United States) Don Whitt	274	−10	1 stroke	(United States) Jim Ferree	20,000	2,800	
1958	(South Africa) Gary Player	274	−14	3 strokes	(United States) Chick Harbert (United States) Ernie Vossler	20,000	2,800	
1957	(United States) Billy Casper	277	−7	1 stroke	(Australia) Peter Thomson	30,000	4,300	
