= Tucson Open =

Golf tournament formerly on the PGA Tour

Coordinates: 32.358°N 111.023°W

Chrysler Classic of Tucson

Tournament information
- Location: Tucson, Arizona
- Established: 1945
- Courses: Omni Tucson National Golf Resort (Catalina Course)
- Par: 72
- Length: 7,193 yards (6,577 m)
- Tour: PGA Tour
- Format: Stroke play
- Prize fund: US$3,000,000
- Month played: February
- Final year: 2006

Tournament record score
- Aggregate: 263 Lloyd Mangrum (1949); 263 Phil Rodgers (1962); 263 Johnny Miller (1975)
- To par: −25 Johnny Miller (1975)

Final champion
- (United States) Kirk Triplett

Location map
- Location in the United States Location in Arizona

The Tucson Open was a golf tournament in Arizona on the PGA Tour from 1945 to 2006, played annually in the winter in Tucson. It was last held at the Omni Tucson National Golf Resort in late February, with a $3 million purse and a $540,000 winner's share.

== History ==
Since the event's inception in 1945, it had been played at a series of courses in Tucson. The first eighteen editions were at El Rio Golf & Country Club, which was purchased by the city in 1968 and is now El Rio Golf Course. In 1963, the event moved to Forty Niner Country Club in 1963 for two years, then began its lengthy relationship with its last location, known at the time as Tucson National Golf Club, which hosted through 1978. It moved to Randolph Park Golf Course in 1979, returned to Tucson National in 1980, then back to Randolph Park for the next six.

From 1984 to 1986, the Tucson Open was contested at match play and was held concurrently with a Senior PGA Tour match play event, the Seiko-Tucson Senior Match Play Championship The 1986 event was played using a Medal match play format.

In 1987 and 1988 the event was played at the TPC at Starr Pass but was not held in 1989. When the event resumed in 1990, it was played at two courses each year from that year's event until 1996. One used every year was the TPC at Starr Pass (renamed Starr Pass Golf Club before the 1993 event). The TPC at Starr Pass shared time with Randolph Park in 1990; from 1991–96 the Tucson National GC was the other course used.

In 1997, the event changed to the more traditional format of 72 holes played at only one course, and has been played since that year at the renamed Omni Tucson National Golf Resort & Spa.

In later years, it was an alternate event, opposite the WGC Match Play championship, then held at La Costa in Carlsbad, California. Because the top 64 ranked players in the world are invited to the WGC event, it weakened the field considerably for Tucson. The match play tournament moved to Tucson in 2007 as a "merging" of sorts between the two tournaments, and stayed through 2014.

On the PGA Tour Champions, the Tucson Conquistadores Classic made its debut in 2015, and is held at the Omni Tucson National Resort in mid-March.

== Tournament highlights ==
- 1945: Ray Mangrum shoots a final round 64 to win the inaugural version of the tournament.
- 1947: Jimmy Demaret becomes the first Tucson champion to successfully defend a title. A final round 65 allows him to finish three shots ahead of Ben Hogan.
- 1949: Lloyd Mangrum shoots a tournament record 263. He wins by five shots over Al Smith.
- 1955: Tommy Bolt eagles the 72nd hole to successfully defend his Tucson Open title.
- 1959: Gene Littler wins for the second consecutive week on the PGA Tour. He finishes one shot ahead of Joe Campbell and Art Wall Jr.
- 1961: Controversial pro golfer Dave Hill wins for the first time on the PGA Tour. He defeats Tommy Bolt and Bud Sullivan on the third hole of a sudden death playoff.
- 1962: Phil Rodgers holes a wedge shot from 65-feet for eagle on the 72nd hole to edge Bud Sullivan by one shot.
- 1965: Only after deciding to play the tournament five minutes before its deadline for entries, New Zealand born Bob Charles makes Tucson his second win in the United States. He beats Al Geiberger by four shots.
- 1968: George Knudson wins for the second consecutive week on the PGA Tour. He finishes one shot ahead of Frank Beard and Frank Boynton.
- 1970: Lee Trevino successfully defends his Tucson Open title. He birdies the first hole of a sudden death playoff to defeat Bob Murphy.
- 1974: Johnny Miller becomes the first golfer in PGA Tour history to win three consecutive tournaments to start the season. He shoots a first round 62 on his way to a three shot triumph over Ben Crenshaw.
- 1975: Tom Weiskopf misses the 36 hole cut with scores of 70 and 78. Afterwards tournament director Biff Baker made a telephone complaint to PGA Tour Commissioner Deane Beman accusing Weiskopf of backhanding putts and not playing in a professional manner. Weiskopf denied the allegations by saying "All they have to do is ask my playing partners."
- 1976: Johnny Miller wins at Tucson for the third consecutive year. He finishes three shots ahead of Howard Twitty.
- 1977: Bruce Lietzke earns the first of his thirteen career PGA Tour wins by defeating Gene Littler on the fourth hole of a sudden death playoff.
- 1980: Poor weather causes the tournament to finish on a Tuesday. Jim Colbert is the winner by four shots over Dan Halldorson.
- 1981: Johnny Miller wins Tucson for the fourth time. He shoots a final round 65 to finish two shots ahead of Lon Hinkle.
- 1984: For the first of three consecutive years, Tucson is conducted as a match play event. Tom Watson wins by defeating defending champion Gil Morgan in the finals by the score of 2 and 1.
- 1986: Defending champion Jim Thorpe wins the last match play edition of Tucson. He defeats Scott Simpson 67 to 71 in the finals.
- 1990: Robert Gamez wins on the PGA Tour in his first event. He finishes four shots ahead of Mark Calcavecchia and Jay Haas. During the tournament's second round, 1988 Tucson champion David Frost, becomes the first PGA Tour player in 33 years to shoot a 60.
- 1991: Twenty-year-old amateur Phil Mickelson birdies the 72nd hole to win by one shot over Bob Tway and Tom Purtzer. Purtzer made double bogey on the tournament's final hole. Hal Sutton hits a six-iron for his second shot on the 9th hole directly at the green. The ball slammed into the cup without touching the green and embedded itself in the lip of the hole. Since part of the ball remained above the level of the hole, it was ruled that Sutton had not holed out. He had to replace the ball and putt it in for a birdie.
- 1992: Future two-time U.S. Open champion Lee Janzen collects his first PGA Tour title. He edges Bill Britton by one shot.
- 1995: Phil Mickelson wins his second Tucson title by one shot over Jim Gallagher Jr. and Scott Simpson after Gallagher three putts the 72nd hole.
- 1997: Jeff Sluman earns his first PGA Tour title since the 1988 PGA Championship. He wins by one shot over Steve Jones.
- 2000: After playing in 292 PGA Tour events, Jim Carter finally reaches the winner's circle. He finishes two shots ahead of Jean van de Velde, Chris DiMarco, and Tom Scherrer.
- 2001: Like Robert Gamez did at the 1990 Tucson, Garrett Willis wins on the PGA Tour in his first event. He wins by one shot over Kevin Sutherland.
- 2005: Future U.S. Open winner Geoff Ogilvy notches his first PGA Tour win. He defeats Mark Calcavecchia and Kevin Na in a sudden death playoff.

== Winners ==
Year	Winner	Score	To par	Margin of victory	Runner(s)-up	Winner's share ($)
Chrysler Classic of Tucson
2006	(United States) Kirk Triplett	266	−22	1 stroke	(United States) Jerry Kelly	540,000
2005	(Australia) Geoff Ogilvy	269	−19	Playoff	(United States) Mark Calcavecchia (United States) Kevin Na	540,000
2004	(United States) Heath Slocum	266	−22	1 stroke	(Australia) Aaron Baddeley	540,000
2003	(United States) Frank Lickliter	269	−19	2 strokes	(United States) Chad Campbell	540,000
Touchstone Energy Tucson Open
2002	(Canada) Ian Leggatt	268	−20	2 strokes	(United States) David Peoples (United States) Loren Roberts	540,000
2001	(United States) Garrett Willis	273	−15	1 stroke	(United States) Kevin Sutherland	540,000
2000	(United States) Jim Carter	269	−19	2 strokes	(United States) Chris DiMarco (United States) Tom Scherrer (France) Jean van de Velde	540,000
1999	(Sweden) Gabriel Hjertstedt	276	−12	Playoff	(United States) Tommy Armour III	495,000
Tucson Chrysler Classic
1998	(United States) David Duval	269	−19	4 strokes	(United States) Justin Leonard (United States) David Toms	360,000
1997	(United States) Jeff Sluman	275	−13	1 stroke	(United States) Steve Jones	234,000
Nortel Open
1996	(United States) Phil Mickelson (3)	273	−14	2 strokes	(United States) Bob Tway	225,000
Northern Telecom Open
1995	(United States) Phil Mickelson (2)	269	−19	1 stroke	(United States) Jim Gallagher Jr. (United States) Scott Simpson	225,000
1994	(United States) Andrew Magee	270	−18	2 strokes	(United States) Jay Don Blake (United States) Loren Roberts (Fiji) Vijay Singh (United States) Steve Stricker	198,000
1993	(United States) Larry Mize	271	−17	2 strokes	(United States) Jeff Maggert	198,000
1992	(United States) Lee Janzen	270	−18	1 stroke	(United States) Bill Britton	198,000
1991	(United States) Phil Mickelson (a)	272	−16	1 stroke	(United States) Tom Purtzer (United States) Bob Tway	180,000
Northern Telecom Tucson Open
1990	(United States) Robert Gamez	270	−18	4 strokes	(United States) Mark Calcavecchia (United States) Jay Haas	162,000
1989: No tournament
1988	(South Africa) David Frost	266	−22	5 strokes	(United States) Mark Calcavecchia (United States) Mark O'Meara	108,000
Seiko Tucson Open
1987	(United States) Mike Reid	268	−20	4 strokes	(United States) Chip Beck (United States) Mark Calcavecchia (United States) Hal Sutton (United States) Fuzzy Zoeller	108,000
Seiko-Tucson Match Play Championship
1986	(United States) Jim Thorpe (2)	67	−5	4 strokes	(United States) Scott Simpson	150,000
1985	(United States) Jim Thorpe	4 and 3			(United States) Jack Renner	150,000
1984	(United States) Tom Watson (2)	2 and 1			(United States) Gil Morgan	100,000
Joe Garagiola-Tucson Open
1983	(United States) Gil Morgan	271	−9	Playoff	(United States) Curtis Strange (United States) Lanny Wadkins	54,000
1982	(United States) Craig Stadler	266	−14	3 strokes	(United States) Vance Heafner (United States) John Mahaffey	54,000
1981	(United States) Johnny Miller (4)	265	−15	2 strokes	(United States) Lon Hinkle	54,000
1980	(United States) Jim Colbert	270	−22	4 strokes	(Canada) Dan Halldorson	54,000
1979	(United States) Bruce Lietzke (2)	265	−15	2 strokes	(United States) Buddy Gardner (United States) Jim Thorpe (United States) Tom Watson	45,000
1978	(United States) Tom Watson	274	−14	3 strokes	(United States) Bobby Wadkins	40,000
1977	(United States) Bruce Lietzke	275	−13	Playoff	(United States) Gene Littler	40,000
NBC Tucson Open
1976	(United States) Johnny Miller (3)	274	−14	3 strokes	(United States) Howard Twitty	40,000
Dean Martin Tucson Open
1975	(United States) Johnny Miller (2)	263	−25	9 strokes	(United States) John Mahaffey	40,000
1974	(United States) Johnny Miller	272	−16	3 strokes	(United States) Ben Crenshaw	30,000
1973	(Australia) Bruce Crampton	277	−11	5 strokes	(United States) George Archer (United States) Gay Brewer (United States) Labron Harris Jr. (United States) Bobby Nichols	30,000
1972	(United States) Miller Barber	273	−15	Playoff	(United States) George Archer	30,000
Tucson Open Invitational
1971	(United States) J. C. Snead	273	−15	1 stroke	(United States) Dale Douglass	22,000
1970	(United States) Lee Trevino (2)	275	−13	Playoff	(United States) Bob Murphy	20,000
1969	(United States) Lee Trevino	271	−17	7 strokes	(United States) Miller Barber	20,000
1968	(Canada) George Knudson	273	−15	1 stroke	(United States) Frank Beard (United States) Frank Boynton	20,000
1967	(United States) Arnold Palmer	273	−15	1 stroke	(United States) Chuck Courtney	12,000
1966	(United States) Joe Campbell	278	−10	Playoff	(United States) Gene Littler	9,000
1965	(New Zealand) Bob Charles	271	−17	4 strokes	(United States) Al Geiberger	6,800
1964	(United States) Jacky Cupit	274	−14	2 strokes	(United States) Rex Baxter	4,000
1963	(United States) Don January	266	−22	11 strokes	(United States) Gene Littler (United States) Phil Rodgers	3,500
1962	(United States) Phil Rodgers	263	−17	3 strokes	(Australia) Jim Ferrier	2,800
Home of the Sun Open
1961	(United States) Dave Hill	269	−11	Playoff	(United States) Tommy Bolt (United States) Bud Sullivan	2,800
Tucson Open Invitational
1960	(United States) Don January	271	−9	3 strokes	(United States) Bob Harris	2,800
1959	(United States) Gene Littler	266	−14	1 stroke	(United States) Joe Campbell (United States) Art Wall Jr.	
1958	(United States) Lionel Hebert	265	−15	2 strokes	(United States) Don January	
1957	(United States) Dow Finsterwald	269	−11	Playoff	(United States) Don Whitt	
1956	(United States) Ted Kroll	264	−16	3 strokes	(United States) Dow Finsterwald	
Tucson Open
1955	(United States) Tommy Bolt (2)	266	−14	3 strokes	(United States) Bud Holscher (United States) Art Wall Jr.	
1954: No tournament
1953	(United States) Tommy Bolt	265	−15	1 stroke	(United States) Chandler Harper	
1952	(United States) Henry Williams, Jr.	274	−6	2 strokes	(United States) Cary Middlecoff	
1951	(United States) Lloyd Mangrum (2)	269	−11	2 strokes	(United States) Jack Burke Jr. (United States) Jim Turnesa (United States) Lew Worsham	
1950	(United States) Chandler Harper	267	−13	2 strokes	(United States) Sam Snead	
1949	(United States) Lloyd Mangrum	263	−17	5 strokes	(United States) Al Smith	
1948	(United States) Skip Alexander	264	−16	1 stroke	(United States) Johnny Palmer	
1947	(United States) Jimmy Demaret (2)	264	−16	3 strokes	(United States) Ben Hogan	
1946	(United States) Jimmy Demaret	268	−12	4 strokes	(United States) Herman Barron	
1945	(United States) Ray Mangrum	268	−12	1 stroke	(United States) Byron Nelson	

== Multiple winners ==
Ten men won this tournament more than once.

- 4 wins
  - Johnny Miller: 1974, 1975, 1976, 1981
- 3 wins
  - Phil Mickelson: 1991(a), 1995, 1996
- 2 wins
  - Jim Thorpe: 1985, 1986
  - Tom Watson: 1978, 1984
  - Bruce Lietzke: 1977, 1979
  - Lee Trevino: 1969, 1970
  - Don January: 1960, 1963
  - Tommy Bolt: 1953, 1955
  - Lloyd Mangrum: 1949, 1951
  - Jimmy Demaret, 1946, 1947
