= 1959 PGA Tour =

Golf tour season

1959 PGA Tour season
- Duration: January 2, 1959 – December 6, 1959
- Number of official events: 46
- Most wins: (United States) Gene Littler (5)
- Money list: (United States) Art Wall Jr.
- PGA Player of the Year: (United States) Art Wall Jr.

The 1959 PGA Tour was the 44th season of the PGA Tour, the main professional golf tour in the United States.

== Schedule ==
The following table lists official events during the 1959 season.

| Date | Tournament | Location | Purse (US$) | Winner (Note: The number in parentheses after each winner's name is the number of PGA Tour events they had won up to and including that tournament. This information is only shown for PGA Tour members.) | Notes |
|---|---|---|---|---|---|
| Jan 5 | Los Angeles Open | California | 35,000 | (United States) Ken Venturi (7) | |
| Jan 12 | Tijuana Open Invitational | Mexico | 20,000 | (United States) Ernie Vossler (2) | |
| Jan 18 | Bing Crosby National Pro-Am | California | 50,000 | (United States) Art Wall Jr. (7) | Pro-Am |
| Jan 25 | Thunderbird Invitational | California | 15,000 | (United States) Arnold Palmer (11) | |
| Feb 1 | San Diego Open Invitational | California | 20,000 | (United States) Marty Furgol (4) | |
| Feb 8 | Phoenix Open Invitational | Arizona | 20,000 | (United States) Gene Littler (10) | |
| Feb 15 | Tucson Open Invitational | Arizona | 15,000 | (United States) Gene Littler (11) | |
| Feb 22 | Texas Open Invitational | Texas | 20,000 | (United States) Wes Ellis (2) | |
| Mar 1 | Baton Rouge Open Invitational | Louisiana | 15,000 | (United States) Howie Johnson (2) | |
| Mar 9 | Greater New Orleans Open Invitational | Louisiana | 20,000 | (United States) Bill Collins (1) | |
| Mar 15 | Pensacola Open Invitational | Florida | 15,000 | (United States) Paul Harney (3) | |
| Mar 23 | St. Petersburg Open Invitational | Florida | 15,000 | (United States) Cary Middlecoff (38) | |
| Mar 30 | Azalea Open Invitational | North Carolina | 15,000 | (United States) Art Wall Jr. (8) | |
| Apr 5 | Masters Tournament | Georgia | 75,000 | (United States) Art Wall Jr. (9) | Major championship |
| Apr 12 | Greater Greensboro Open | North Carolina | 20,000 | (United States) Dow Finsterwald (6) | |
| Apr 19 | Houston Classic | Texas | 30,000 | (United States) Jack Burke Jr. (14) | |
| Apr 26 | Tournament of Champions | Nevada | 20,000 | (United States) Mike Souchak (8) | Winners-only event |
| May 3 | Colonial National Invitation | Texas | 27,300 | (United States) Ben Hogan (64) | Invitational |
| May 11 | Oklahoma City Open Invitational | Oklahoma | 25,000 | (United States) Arnold Palmer (12) | |
| May 17 | Arlington Hotel Open | Arkansas | 20,000 | (United States) Gene Littler (12) | |
| May 25 | Memphis Open Invitational | Tennessee | 25,000 | (United States) Don Whitt (1) | |
| May 31 | Kentucky Derby Open | Kentucky | 20,000 | (United States) Don Whitt (2) | |
| Jun 7 | Eastern Open Invitational | Maryland | 20,000 | (United States) Dave Ragan (1) | |
| Jun 13 | U.S. Open | New York | 50,000 | (United States) Billy Casper (7) | Major championship |
| Jun 20 | Canadian Open | Canada | 25,000 | (United States) Doug Ford (14) | |
| Jun 27 | Gleneagles-Chicago Open Invitational | Illinois | 57,000 | (United States) Ken Venturi (8) | |
| Jul 3 | The Open Championship | Scotland | £5,000 | (South Africa) Gary Player (2) | Major championship (Note: Unofficial money event at the time, but retrospectively counted as an official win.) |
| Jul 5 | Buick Open Invitational | Michigan | 57,000 | (United States) Art Wall Jr. (10) | |
| Jul 12 | Western Open | Pennsylvania | 30,000 | (United States) Mike Souchak (9) | |
| Jul 19 | Insurance City Open Invitational | Connecticut | 25,000 | (United States) Gene Littler (12) | |
| Aug 2 | PGA Championship | Minnesota | 50,000 | (United States) Bob Rosburg (4) | Major championship |
| Aug 9 | Carling Open Invitational | Washington | 25,000 | (United States) Dow Finsterwald (7) | |
| Aug 16 | Motor City Open | Michigan | 25,000 | (United States) Mike Souchak (10) | |
| Aug 23 | Rubber City Open Invitational | Ohio | 20,000 | (United States) Tom Nieporte (1) | |
| Aug 30 | Miller Open Invitational | Wisconsin | 35,000 | (United States) Gene Littler (13) | |
| Sep 7 | Kansas City Open Invitational | Missouri | 20,000 | (United States) Dow Finsterwald (8) | |
| Sep 14 | Dallas Open Invitational | Texas | 25,000 | (United States) Julius Boros (8) | |
| Sep 20 | El Paso Open | Texas | 20,000 | (United States) Marty Furgol (5) | |
| Sep 27 | Golden Gate Championship | California | 45,000 | (United States) Mason Rudolph (1) | New tournament |
| Oct 4 | Portland Centennial Open Invitational | Oregon | 20,000 | (United States) Billy Casper (8) | |
| Oct 11 | Hesperia Open Invitational | California | 15,000 | (United States) Eric Monti (2) | |
| Oct 18 | Orange County Open Invitational | California | 15,000 | (United States) Jay Hebert (4) | New tournament |
| Nov 15 | Lafayette Open Invitational | Louisiana | 15,000 | (United States) Billy Casper (9) | |
| Nov 22 | Mobile Sertoma Open Invitational | Alabama | 15,000 | (United States) Billy Casper (10) | New tournament |
| Nov 29 | West Palm Beach Open Invitational | Florida | 15,000 | (United States) Arnold Palmer (13) | |
| Dec 6 | Coral Gables Open Invitational | Florida | 20,000 | (United States) Doug Sanders (3) | |

=== Unofficial events ===
The following events were sanctioned by the PGA Tour, but did not carry official money, nor were wins official.

| Date | Tournament | Location | Purse ($) | Winner(s) | Notes |
|---|---|---|---|---|---|
| Nov 7 | Ryder Cup | California | n/a | Team USA | Team event |
| Nov 21 | Canada Cup | Australia | n/a | (Australia) Kel Nagle and (Australia) Peter Thomson | Team event |
| Nov 21 | Canada Cup Individual Trophy | Australia | n/a | (Belgium) Flory Van Donck | |

== Money list ==
The money list was based on prize money won during the season, calculated in U.S. dollars.

| Position | Player | Prize money ($) |
|---|---|---|
| 1 | (United States) Art Wall Jr. | 53,168 |
| 2 | (United States) Gene Littler | 38,296 |
| 3 | (United States) Dow Finsterwald | 33,906 |
| 4 | (United States) Billy Casper | 33,899 |
| 5 | (United States) Arnold Palmer | 32,462 |
| 6 | (United States) Mike Souchak | 31,807 |
| 7 | (United States) Bob Rosburg | 31,676 |
| 8 | (United States) Doug Ford | 31,009 |
| 9 | (United States) Jay Hebert | 26,034 |
| 10 | (United States) Ken Venturi | 25,886 |

== Awards ==
| Award | Winner | Ref. |
|---|---|---|
| PGA Player of the Year | (United States) Art Wall Jr. | |
| Scoring leader (Vardon Trophy) | (United States) Art Wall Jr. | |
