= St. Jude Classic =

Defunct golf tournament held in Memphis, Tennessee, US

FedEx St. Jude Classic

Tournament information
- Location: Memphis, Tennessee
- Established: 1958
- Course: TPC Southwind
- Par: 70
- Length: 7,244 yards (6,624 m)
- Tour: PGA Tour
- Format: Stroke play
- Prize fund: US$6,600,000
- Month played: June
- Final year: 2018

Tournament record score
- Aggregate: 258 John Cook (1996)
- To par: −26 as above

Final champion
- (United States) Dustin Johnson
- Location in the United States Location in Tennessee

The FedEx St. Jude Classic was a professional golf tournament held in Memphis, Tennessee, as a regular event on the PGA Tour. The tournament was held annually from 1958 through 2018, and was played in June at TPC Southwind (since 1989).

In 2019, FedEx took over sponsorship of the WGC Invitational and relocated it to Memphis in late July. The WGC event continued the charitable relationship with St. Jude Children's Research Hospital, and was renamed WGC-FedEx St. Jude Invitational For the 2022 season, the WGC Invitational was discontinued, and the first FedEx Cup playoff event was relocated to TPC Southwind with FedEx as the new title sponsor and became the FedEx St. Jude Championship.

== History ==
The tournament debuted 68 years ago in May 1958 as the Memphis Open and was played annually at Colonial Country Club in Memphis through 1971, then at the club's new home in Cordova through 1988. The late Vernon Bell, a Memphis restaurateur, co-founded the tournament and served as its general chairman for 22 years. He is also the father of the late Chris Bell.

=== St. Jude ===
In 1969, entertainer Danny Thomas (1912–1991) agreed to lend his name to the tournament in exchange for his St. Jude Children's Research Hospital becoming the tournament's charity. Accordingly, the tournament changed its name the following year to the Danny Thomas Memphis Classic.

In 1977, President Gerald Ford, who had left office in January, made a hole-in-one during the tournament's celebrity pro-am while playing with Thomas and Ben Crenshaw. Two days later, Al Geiberger shot a PGA Tour record 59 (−13) in the second round with eleven birdies and an eagle. He needed a rally on Sunday to win by three strokes at 273 (–15).

Since partnering with the tournament, more than $66 million has been raised for St. Jude Children’s Research Hospital.

=== Federal Express ===
In 1986, Memphis-based courier Federal Express became the title sponsor. For the first three years of their sponsorship, FedEx increased the purse one dollar for each package they shipped on the Friday of the tournament. The purses went from $500,000 to $605,912 in 1986, from $600,000 to $724,043 in 1987, and from $750,000 to $953,842 in 1988.

The Stanford Financial Group took over as the tournament's title sponsor in 2007, and it was renamed Stanford St. Jude Championship. In 2009, the tournament changed its name to St. Jude Classic, following accusations that the Stanford Financial Group was a Ponzi scheme. FedEx returned as title sponsor in 2011, and has remained though the standard tournament era, the WGC version (2019–2021), and Playoffs era (since 2022).

=== TPC Southwind ===
The event's final edition at Colonial Country Club in Cordova was 38 years ago in 1988. It moved to its present location at TPC Southwind in Memphis in 1989.

The purse in 2018 was $6.6 million, with a winner's share of $1.188 million.

== Tournament highlights ==
- 1958: Billy Maxwell wins the first Memphis Open. He beats Cary Middlecoff by one shot.
- 1961: Local favorite Cary Middlecoff beats Gardner Dickinson and Mike Souchak by five shots.
- 1965: Jack Nicklaus, who played in Memphis very infrequently, beats Johnny Pott on the first hole of a sudden death playoff.
- 1966: Bert Yancey wins by five shots over Gene Littler but only after nearly missing his Sunday tee time. A last moment phone call from his caddy kept Yancey from being disqualified.
- 1967: Dave Hill goes wire-to-wire for his first Memphis win. He defeats Johnny Pott by two shots.
- 1970: Dave Hill becomes the first Memphis winner to successfully defend his title. He defeats Homero Blancas, Frank Beard, and Bob Charles by one shot.
- 1971: Lee Trevino wins in Memphis for the first time. He defeats Jerry Heard, Hale Irwin, Lee Elder and Randy Wolff by four shots.
- 1973: Dave Hill earns his 4th and final Memphis win. He beats Allen Miller and Lee Trevino by one shot.
- 1977: Al Geiberger shoots a second round 59 (the first 59 in a PGA Tour event), then holds on to win the tournament by three shots over Gary Player and Jerry McGee.
- 1980: Lee Trevino triumphs in Memphis for the third and final time. He beats Tom Purtzer by one shot.
- 1981: After making a birdie on the 72nd hole to win by two shots over Tom Kite and Bruce Lietzke, Jerry Pate leaps into the lake adjoining the 18th green.
- 1986: Mike Hulbert birdies the 72nd hole for his first ever PGA Tour win. He wins by one shot over his roommate for the week, Joey Sindelar.
- 1987: Mike McGee becomes one of just eight PGA Tour players with an 18-putt round. Despite the feat, McGee missed the cut.
- 1992: Jay Haas shoots 64–64 over the last 36 holes to win by three shots over Dan Forsman and Robert Gamez.
- 1994: PGA Tour rookie Dicky Pride beats Gene Sauers and Hal Sutton in a playoff with a birdie on the first hole.
- 1996: John Cook shoots a PGA Tour record 189 for 54 holes on his way to a seven shot win over John Adams.
- 1997: Greg Norman birdies the final three holes to beat Dudley Hart by one shot.
- 2000: Notah Begay III beats Bob May and Chris DiMarco by one shot. It is his first win after being convicted of drunken driving in March of the same year and having to spend seven days in jail.
- 2003: David Toms shoots a final round 64 to get his first of back-to-back Memphis titles. He beats Nick Price by three shots.
- 2005: Justin Leonard ties the record for the highest final round score by a Memphis winner, a 73, on his way to a one-shot victory over David Toms.
- 2010: Lee Westwood defeats Robert Karlsson and Robert Garrigus in a sudden-death playoff after Garrigus comes to the 72nd hole with a three-shot lead before finishing with a triple bogey.
- 2011: After 13 years and 355 starts, Harrison Frazar won his first PGA Tour event after beating Robert Karlsson in a playoff. Frazar was playing on a medical extension after hip surgery and was actually considering retirement before his win. Karlsson lost in a playoff for the second consecutive season.
- 2017: Daniel Berger becomes the first golfer since David Toms to win back-to-back.

== Course ==
TPC Southwind in 2013

Hole	1	2	3	4	5	6	7	8	9	Out	10	11	12	13	14	15	16	17	18	In	Total
Yards	434	401	554	196	485	445	482	178	457	3,632	465	162	406	472	239	395	530	490	453	3,612	7,244
Par	4	4	5	3	4	4	4	3	4	35	4	3	4	4	3	4	5	4	4	35	70

== Winners ==
Year	Winner	Score	To par	Margin of victory	Runner(s)-up	Purse ($)	Winner's share ($)
FedEx St. Jude Classic
2018	(United States) Dustin Johnson (2)	261	−19	6 strokes	(United States) Andrew Putnam	6,600,000	1,188,000
2017	(United States) Daniel Berger (2)	270	−10	1 stroke	(South Korea) Kim Meen-whee (South Africa) Charl Schwartzel	6,400,000	1,152,000
2016	(United States) Daniel Berger	267	−13	3 strokes	(United States) Brooks Koepka (United States) Phil Mickelson (United States) Steve Stricker	6,200,000	1,116,000
2015	(Argentina) Fabián Gómez	267	−13	4 strokes	(England) Greg Owen	6,000,000	1,080,000
2014	(United States) Ben Crane	270	–10	1 stroke	(United States) Troy Merritt	5,800,000	1,044,000
2013	(United States) Harris English	268	−12	2 strokes	(United States) Phil Mickelson (United States) Scott Stallings	5,700,000	1,026,000
2012	(United States) Dustin Johnson	271	−9	1 stroke	(United States) John Merrick	5,600,000	1,008,000
2011	(United States) Harrison Frazar	267	−13	Playoff	(Sweden) Robert Karlsson	5,600,000	1,008,000
St. Jude Classic
2010	(England) Lee Westwood	270	−10	Playoff	(United States) Robert Garrigus (Sweden) Robert Karlsson	5,600,000	1,008,000
2009	(United States) Brian Gay	262	−18	5 strokes	(United States) Bryce Molder (United States) David Toms	5,600,000	1,008,000
Stanford St. Jude Championship
2008	(United States) Justin Leonard (2)	276	−4	Playoff	(Australia) Robert Allenby (South Africa) Trevor Immelman	6,000,000	1,080,000
2007	(United States) Woody Austin	267	−13	5 strokes	(England) Brian Davis	6,000,000	1,080,000
FedEx St. Jude Classic
2006	(United States) Jeff Maggert	271	−9	3 strokes	(United States) Tom Pernice Jr.	5,200,000	936,000
2005	(United States) Justin Leonard	266	−14	1 stroke	(United States) David Toms	4,900,000	882,000
2004	(United States) David Toms (2)	268	−16	6 strokes	(United States) Bob Estes	4,700,000	846,000
2003	(United States) David Toms	264	−20	3 strokes	(Zimbabwe) Nick Price	4,500,000	810,000
2002	(United States) Len Mattiace	266	−18	1 stroke	(United States) Tim Petrovic	3,800,000	684,000
2001	(United States) Bob Estes	267	−17	1 stroke	(Germany) Bernhard Langer	3,500,000	630,000
2000	(United States) Notah Begay III	271	−13	1 stroke	(United States) Chris DiMarco (United States) Bob May	3,000,000	540,000
1999	(United States) Ted Tryba	265	−19	2 strokes	(United States) Tim Herron (United States) Tom Lehman	2,500,000	450,000
1998	(Zimbabwe) Nick Price (2)	268	−16	Playoff	(United States) Jeff Sluman	1,800,000	324,000
1997	(Australia) Greg Norman	268	−16	1 stroke	(United States) Dudley Hart	1,500,000	270,000
1996	(United States) John Cook	258	−26	7 strokes	(United States) John Adams	1,350,000	243,000
1995	(United States) Jim Gallagher Jr.	267	−17	1 stroke	(United States) Jay Delsing (United States) Ken Green	1,250,000	225,000
Federal Express St. Jude Classic
1994	(United States) Dicky Pride	267	−17	Playoff	(United States) Gene Sauers (United States) Hal Sutton	1,250,000	225,000
1993	(Zimbabwe) Nick Price	266	−18	3 strokes	(United States) Rick Fehr (United States) Jeff Maggert	1,100,000	198,000
1992	(United States) Jay Haas	263	−21	3 strokes	(United States) Dan Forsman (United States) Robert Gamez	1,100,000	198,000
1991	(United States) Fred Couples	269	−15	3 strokes	(United States) Rick Fehr	1,000,000	180,000
1990	(United States) Tom Kite	269	−15	Playoff	(United States) John Cook	1,000,000	180,000
1989	(United States) John Mahaffey	272	−12	3 strokes	(United States) Bob Gilder (United States) Hubert Green (West Germany) Bernhard Langer (United States) Bob Tway	1,000,000	180,000
1988	(United States) Jodie Mudd	273	−15	1 stroke	(United States) Peter Jacobsen (Zimbabwe) Nick Price	953,842	171,692
1987	(United States) Curtis Strange	275	−13	1 stroke	(United States) Russ Cochran (United States) Mike Donald (United States) Tom Kite (Zimbabwe) Denis Watson	724,043	130,328
1986	(United States) Mike Hulbert	280	−8	1 stroke	(United States) Joey Sindelar	605,912	109,064
St. Jude Memphis Classic
1985	(United States) Hal Sutton	279	−9	Playoff	(United States) David Ogrin	500,000	90,000
Danny Thomas Memphis Classic
1984	(United States) Bob Eastwood	280	−8	2 strokes	(United States) Ralph Landrum (United States) Mark O'Meara (United States) Tim Simpson	500,000	90,000
1983	(United States) Larry Mize	274	−14	1 stroke	(United States) Chip Beck (United States) Sammy Rachels (United States) Fuzzy Zoeller	400,000	72,000
1982	(United States) Raymond Floyd	271	−17	6 strokes	(United States) Mike Holland	400,000	72,000
1981	(United States) Jerry Pate	274	−14	2 strokes	(United States) Tom Kite (United States) Bruce Lietzke	300,000	54,000
1980	(United States) Lee Trevino (3)	272	−16	1 stroke	(United States) Tom Purtzer	300,000	54,000
1979	(United States) Gil Morgan	278	−10	Playoff	(United States) Larry Nelson	300,000	54,000
1978	(United States) Andy Bean	277	−11	Playoff	(United States) Lee Trevino	250,000	50,000
1977	(United States) Al Geiberger	273	−15	3 strokes	(United States) Jerry McGee (South Africa) Gary Player	200,000	40,000
1976	(United States) Gibby Gilbert	273	−15	4 strokes	(United States) Forrest Fezler (New Zealand) John Lister (United States) Gil Morgan	200,000	40,000
1975	(United States) Gene Littler	270	−18	5 strokes	(United States) John Mahaffey	175,000	35,000
1974	(South Africa) Gary Player	273	−15	2 strokes	(United States) Lou Graham (United States) Hubert Green	175,000	35,000
1973	(United States) Dave Hill (4)	283	−5	1 stroke	(United States) Allen Miller (United States) Lee Trevino	175,000	35,000
1972	(United States) Lee Trevino (2)	281	−7	4 strokes	(United States) John Mahaffey	175,000	35,000
1971	(United States) Lee Trevino	268	−12	4 strokes	(United States) Lee Elder (United States) Jerry Heard (United States) Hale Irwin (United States) Randy Wolff	175,000	35,000
1970	(United States) Dave Hill (3)	267	−13	1 stroke	(United States) Frank Beard (United States) Homero Blancas (New Zealand) Bob Charles	150,000	30,000
Memphis Open Invitational
1969	(United States) Dave Hill (2)	265	−15	2 strokes	(United States) Lee Elder	150,000	30,000
1968	(United States) Bob Lunn	268	−12	1 stroke	(United States) Monty Kaser	100,000	20,000
1967	(United States) Dave Hill	272	−8	2 strokes	(United States) Johnny Pott	100,000	20,000
1966	(United States) Bert Yancey	265	−15	5 strokes	(United States) Gene Littler	100,000	20,000
1965	(United States) Jack Nicklaus	271	−9	Playoff	(United States) Johnny Pott	60,000	9,000
1964	(United States) Mike Souchak	270	−10	1 stroke	(United States) Billy Casper (United States) Tommy Jacobs	50,000	7,500
1963	(United States) Tony Lema	270	−10	Playoff	(United States) Tommy Aaron	50,000	9,000
1962	(United States) Lionel Hebert	267	−13	Playoff	(United States) Gene Littler (South Africa) Gary Player	40,000	6,400
1961	(United States) Cary Middlecoff	266	−14	5 strokes	(United States) Gardner Dickinson (United States) Mike Souchak	30,000	4,300
1960	(United States) Tommy Bolt	273	−7	Playoff	(United States) Ben Hogan (United States) Gene Littler	30,000	4,300
Memphis Open
1959	(United States) Don Whitt	272	−8	Playoff	(Canada) Al Balding (South Africa) Gary Player	25,000	3,500
1958	(United States) Billy Maxwell	267	−13	1 stroke	(United States) Cary Middlecoff	20,000	2,800

Note: Green highlight indicates scoring records.
