= Larry Mize =

American professional golfer (born 1958)

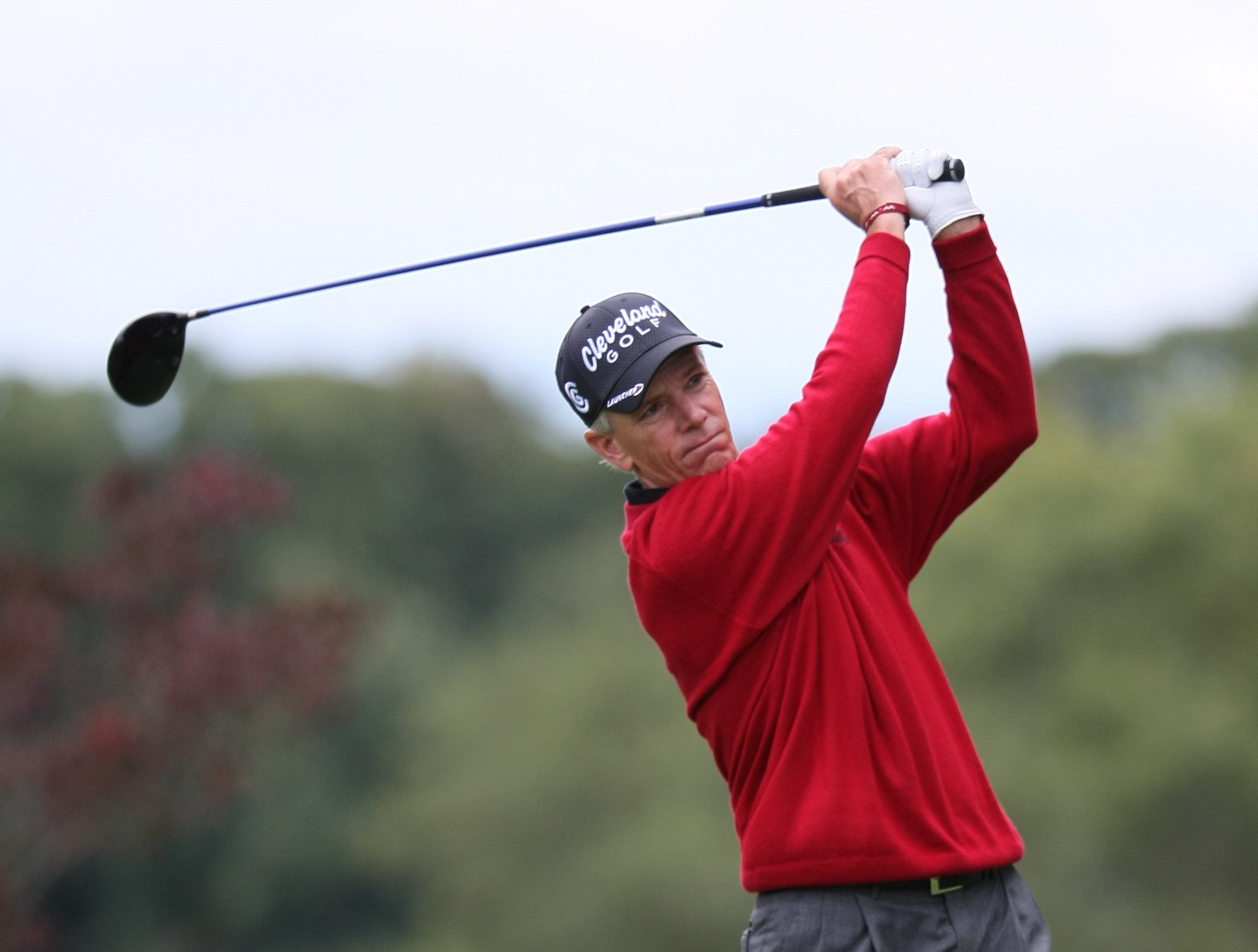
- Mize in 2009

Personal information
- Full name: Lawrence Hogan Mize
- Nationality: United States
- Born: September 23, 1958 (age 68) Augusta, Georgia, U.S.
- Height: 6 ft 0 in (1.83 m)
- Weight: 165 lb (75 kg; 11.8 st)

Career
- Sport: Golf
- College: Georgia Tech
- Turned professional: 1980
- Current tour: Champions Tour
- Former tour: PGA Tour
- Professional wins: 10
- Highest ranking: 10 (June 21, 1987)

Number of wins by tour
- PGA Tour: 4
- European Tour: 1
- Japan Golf Tour: 3
- PGA Tour Champions: 1

Best results in major championships (wins: 1)
- Masters Tournament: Won: 1987
- PGA Championship: T6: 1984
- U.S. Open: T4: 1987
- The Open Championship: T11: 1994

Lawrence Hogan Mize (born September 23, 1958) is an American professional golfer who played on the PGA Tour and currently plays on the Champions Tour. He is well known for one career-defining shot – a chip from off the green at the 11th hole at Augusta to win the playoff for the 1987 Masters Tournament, which is his only major title to date. He is also the only winner of that tournament to come from Augusta.

== Early life and amateur career ==
In 1958, Mize was born in Augusta, Georgia. He worked during his teenage years at the Masters Tournament as a scoreboard operator on the 3rd hole. Mize attended Georgia Tech.

== Professional career ==
In 1980, Mize turned professional. He finished in the top 125 on the money list (the level needed to retain membership of the tour) for 20 seasons from 1982 to 2001. His first PGA Tour win was the 1983 Danny Thomas Memphis Classic. In 1986, at the Kemper Open, Mize lost a six-hole playoff to Greg Norman.

At the 1987 Masters Tournament, Mize was tied with Seve Ballesteros and Norman after four rounds. Ballesteros was eliminated in the first hole of the playoff after missing a 5-footer for par. On the second playoff hole, Augusta's par-4 11th, Mize's second shot landed well to the right of the green. It appeared a birdie would be impossible and even a par would be a challenge. Meanwhile, Norman's second shot landed on the edge of the green leaving him a lengthy birdie putt. On his third shot, Mize holed a memorable chip shot with a sand wedge from around 140 feet, giving him the birdie. Norman now had an opportunity to tie, but he failed to sink the putt. His Masters win and a tie for fourth at the U.S. Open in June briefly put him in the top-10 of the Official World Golf Ranking.

Mize won twice more on the PGA Tour, at tournaments in Tucson, Arizona, in 1993, at the Northern Telecom Open, and at the Buick Open in Flint, Michigan, also in 1993. He also won on the Champions Tour victory in 2010, in Montreal.

Mize also won four international events and played for the U.S. teams in the Ryder Cup in 1987 and the Dunhill Cup in 2000.

For many years Mize and Coca-Cola sponsored a successful charity golf tournament to benefit cystic fibrosis held at the Atlanta Athletic Club. He played in 40 consecutive Masters Tournaments, 36 of which were after earning a lifetime invitation because of his 1987 win.

== Personal life ==
Mize currently resides in Columbus, Georgia with his wife and three sons. His hobbies are fishing, basketball, and playing the piano.

== Professional wins (10) ==
=== PGA Tour wins (4) ===
Legend
Major championships (1)
Other PGA Tour (3)

No.	Date	Tournament	Winning score	To par	Margin of victory	Runner(s)-up
1	Jun 26, 1983	Danny Thomas Memphis Classic	70-65-69-70=274	−14	1 stroke	(United States) Chip Beck, (United States) Sammy Rachels, (United States) Fuzzy Zoeller
2	Apr 12, 1987	Masters Tournament	70-72-72-71=285	−3	Playoff	(Spain) Seve Ballesteros, (Australia) Greg Norman
3	Jan 24, 1993	Northern Telecom Open	68-66-70-67=271	−17	2 strokes	(United States) Jeff Maggert
4	Aug 8, 1993	Buick Open	64-69-71-68=272	−16	1 stroke	(United States) Fuzzy Zoeller

PGA Tour playoff record (1–3)

No.	Year	Tournament	Opponent(s)	Result
1	1986	Kemper Open	(Australia) Greg Norman	Lost to par on sixth extra hole
2	1987	Masters Tournament	(Spain) Seve Ballesteros, (Australia) Greg Norman	Won with birdie on second extra hole Ballesteros eliminated by par on first hole
3	1990	MCI Heritage Golf Classic	(United States) Steve Jones, (United States) Payne Stewart	Stewart won with birdie on second extra hole Jones eliminated by par on first hole
4	1998	Canon Greater Hartford Open	(United States) Olin Browne, (United States) Stewart Cink	Browne won with birdie on first extra hole

=== PGA of Japan Tour wins (3) ===
No.	Date	Tournament	Winning score	To par	Margin of victory	Runner-up
1	Nov 27, 1988	Casio World Open	72-71-68-73=284	−4	1 stroke	(Japan) Masashi Ozaki
2	Nov 19, 1989	Dunlop Phoenix Tournament	69-64-71-68=272	−16	4 strokes	(Japan) Naomichi Ozaki
3	Nov 18, 1990	Dunlop Phoenix Tournament (2)	69-65-69-71=274	−14	3 strokes	(Japan) Naomichi Ozaki

=== Other wins (2) ===
- 1993 Johnnie Walker World Golf Championship (unofficial event)
- 2000 Straight Down Fall Classic (with Jim Lehman)

=== Champions Tour wins (1) ===
No.	Date	Tournament	Winning score	To par	Margin of victory	Runner-up
1	Jul 4, 2010	Montreal Championship	67-68-64=199	−17	1 stroke	(United States) John Cook

== Major championships ==
=== Wins (1) ===
Year	Championship	54 holes	Winning score	To par	Margin	Runners-up
1987	Masters Tournament	2 shot deficit	70-72-72-71=285	−3	Playoff^{1}	(Australia) Greg Norman, (Spain) Seve Ballesteros

^{1}Defeated Norman and Ballesteros in a sudden-death playoff: Mize (4-3), Norman (4-x) and Ballesteros (5).

=== Results timeline ===
Results not in chronological order in 2020.

Tournament	1980	1981	1982	1983	1984	1985	1986	1987	1988	1989
Masters Tournament					T11	T47	T16	1	T45	T26
U.S. Open		CUT	CUT			T39	T24	T4	T12	T33
The Open Championship					CUT		T46	T26	CUT	T19
PGA Championship				T47	T6	T23	T53	CUT	CUT	T17

Tournament	1990	1991	1992	1993	1994	1995	1996	1997	1998	1999
Masters Tournament	T14	T17	T6	T21	3	CUT	T23	T30	CUT	23
U.S. Open	T14	T55	CUT	CUT	CUT	CUT	CUT	T58		64
The Open Championship	T31	CUT	CUT	T27	T11	CUT			T52	
PGA Championship	T12	CUT	T40	CUT	T15	CUT	T8	T58	CUT	

Tournament	2000	2001	2002	2003	2004	2005	2006	2007	2008	2009
Masters Tournament	T25	CUT	CUT	CUT	CUT	CUT	T42	CUT	CUT	T30
U.S. Open	T37			CUT						
The Open Championship										
PGA Championship										

Tournament	2010	2011	2012	2013	2014	2015	2016	2017	2018
Masters Tournament	CUT	CUT	CUT	CUT	51	CUT	T52	52	CUT
U.S. Open									
The Open Championship									
PGA Championship									

Tournament	2019	2020	2021	2022	2023
Masters Tournament	CUT	CUT	CUT	CUT	CUT
PGA Championship					
U.S. Open					
The Open Championship		NT			

Win
Top 10
Did not play

CUT = missed the half-way cut (3rd round cut in 1984 Open Championship)
"T" indicates a tie for a place
NT = No tournament due to COVID-19 pandemic

=== Summary ===
Tournament	Wins	2nd	3rd	Top-5	Top-10	Top-25	Events	Cuts made
Masters Tournament	1	0	1	2	3	11	40	20
PGA Championship	0	0	0	0	2	6	16	10
U.S. Open	0	0	0	1	1	4	18	10
The Open Championship	0	0	0	0	0	2	12	7
Totals	1	0	1	3	6	23	86	47

- Most consecutive cuts made – 11 (1984 PGA – 1987 Open Championship)
- Longest streak of top-10s – 2 (1987 Masters – 1987 U.S. Open)

== Results in The Players Championship ==
Tournament	1983	1984	1985	1986	1987	1988	1989	1990	1991	1992	1993	1994	1995	1996	1997	1998	1999	2000	2001	2002
The Players Championship	T13	T15	CUT	2	T12	CUT	T70	CUT	CUT	T54	CUT	CUT	T8	T13	T14	T31	T23	CUT	CUT	CUT

Top 10

CUT = missed the halfway cut
"T" indicates a tie for a place

== Results in senior major championships ==
Results not in chronological order before 2022.

Tournament	2008	2009	2010	2011	2012	2013	2014	2015	2016	2017	2018	2019	2020	2021	2022	2023
The Tradition		4	T25		T25	T31	T46	T24	T9	T42	T34		NT	T29	74	T69
Senior PGA Championship		2	T6	CUT	T38	CUT	CUT	WD	T16	T11	T38	T68	NT	T23		
U.S. Senior Open		T16	T8	T29	63	T30			T43		T38		NT			
Senior Players Championship	T27	T47	T33		T30	T24	T28	T59	T20	T35	T17	T52	T48	WD		
Senior British Open Championship		T6	T14	T21	T47	T21		CUT		T38	CUT	CUT	NT			

Top 10
Did not play

CUT = missed the half-way cut
WD = withdrew
"T" indicates a tie for a place
NT = No tournament due to COVID-19 pandemic

== U.S. national team appearances ==
Professional

- Ryder Cup: 1987
- Alfred Dunhill Cup: 2000

== See also ==
- Fall 1981 PGA Tour Qualifying School graduates
