= Don Whitt =

American professional golfer (1930–2013)

Personal information
- Full name: Donald Everett Whitt
- Nationality: United States
- Born: November 15, 1930 San Francisco, California, U.S.
- Died: September 25, 2013 (aged 82) San Diego, California, U.S.

Career
- Sport: Golf
- Status: Professional
- Professional wins: 6

Number of wins by tour
- PGA Tour: 2
- Other: 4

Best results in major championships
- Masters Tournament: CUT: 1958
- PGA Championship: 4th: 1957
- U.S. Open: T17: 1960, 1962
- The Open Championship: DNP

Donald Everett Whitt (November 15, 1930 – September 25, 2013) was an American professional golfer who played on the PGA Tour in the 1950s and 1960s.

== Early life ==
Whitt was a student of accomplished black golf instructor Lucius Bateman, teacher of such other multiple-tournament-winning PGA Touring pros as Tony Lema, John McMullin, and Dick Lotz. Developing his swing at Oakland's Airway Fairways driving range under Bateman's tutelage, Whitt captured the 1948 Alameda Commuters tournament as a teenager and that summer came within one hole of winning the Northern California Junior Golf Championship.

== Professional career ==
After serving in the U.S. Navy, Whitt decided to turn professional, accepting a job as a club pro at Sequoyah Country Club in Oakland, California. There, in 1956, on his way to a world record golf score of 58, he three-putted the final two greens, but managed to establish a course record 60 - a score that still stands after more than a half-century of play by noted professionals and amateurs alike. After leaving Sequoyah, he joined the PGA Tour for several years.

In 1957, Whitt finished the Tucson Open Invitational in a tie for first (269), but lost in an 18-hole playoff to Dow Finsterwald. That same year, in an article heralding professional golf's "Young Timers" Time magazine wrote of Whitt's "tremendous rally...that included a startling hole-in-one on the 145-yd 13th" before bowing - again to Finsterwald - in the semi-finals of the 1957 PGA Championship. The following year Whitt won his first professional golf tournament, the 1958 Montebello Open. His career year was 1959 when he won Golf Digest's Most Improved Player award. He won the Memphis Open in a playoff on May 25 of that year, and just six days later won the Kentucky Derby Open. In January 1960, Sports Illustrated acknowledged Whitt as "a plugger...who can on occasion beat anybody." Aside from Whitt's semi-final loss in the 1957 PGA Championship, his best finish in a major was a T-15 in the 1961 PGA Championship, the same year he captured the Venezuela and Maracaibo Opens, and finished runner-up to Gary Player in the Lucky International tournament in San Francisco. Whitt was a good friend of fellow Bateman-protégé Tony Lema, winner of the 1964 British Open, and is prominently featured in Lema's 1964 memoir "Golfer's Gold", that related their antics on the Caribbean Tour in 1961.

After retiring from full-time play on the Tour, Whitt worked as a teaching pro at the San Diego Golf Academy.

== Awards and honors ==
- In 1959, he earned Golf Digest's Most Improved Player award

== Professional wins (6) ==
=== PGA Tour wins (2) ===
No.	Date	Tournament	Winning score	Margin of victory	Runner(s)-up
1	May 25, 1959	Memphis Open	−8 (67-70-64-71=272)	Playoff	(Canada) Al Balding, (South Africa) Gary Player
2	May 31, 1959	Kentucky Derby Open	−10 (70-64-73-67=274)	1 stroke	(United States) Jim Ferree

PGA Tour playoff record (1–1)

No.	Year	Tournament	Opponent(s)	Result
1	1957	Tucson Open Invitational	(United States) Dow Finsterwald	Lost 18-hole playoff; Finsterwald: −5 (65), Whitt: −1 (69)
2	1959	Memphis Open	(Canada) Al Balding, (South Africa) Gary Player	Won with par on second extra hole Balding eliminated by birdie on first hole

=== Other wins (4) ===
This list may be incomplete

- 1958 Montebello Open
- 1959 Port Arthur Pro Am
- 1961 Caracas Open, Maracaibo Open Invitational
