= Lionel Hebert =

American professional golfer (1928–2000)

Personal information
- Full name: Lionel Paul Hebert
- Nationality: United States
- Born: January 20, 1928 Lafayette, Louisiana, U.S.
- Died: December 30, 2000 (aged 72) Lafayette, Louisiana, U.S.
- Height: 5 ft 8.5 in (1.74 m)
- Weight: 200 lb (91 kg; 14 st)
- Spouse: Clara Belle Hebert
- Children: 3

Career
- Sport: Golf
- College: Southwestern Louisiana; Louisiana State
- Turned professional: 1950
- Former tour: PGA Tour
- Professional wins: 5

Number of wins by tour
- PGA Tour: 5

Best results in major championships (wins: 1)
- Masters Tournament: T7: 1968
- PGA Championship: Won: 1957
- U.S. Open: T14: 1963
- The Open Championship: DNP

Lionel Paul Hebert (January 20, 1928 – December 30, 2000) was an American professional golfer.

== Career ==
Hebert won five times on the PGA Tour, including the PGA Championship in 1957, the last edition held at match play. His older brother Jay won the same event at stroke play in 1960. Lionel also played on the Ryder Cup team in 1957. An ethnic Cajun from Louisiana, he was born and died in Lafayette.

== Professional wins (5) ==
=== PGA Tour wins (5) ===
Legend
Major championships (1)
Other PGA Tour (4)

No.	Date	Tournament	Winning score	To par	Margin of victory	Runner(s)-up
1	Jul 21, 1957	PGA Championship	2 and 1			(United States) Dow Finsterwald
2	Feb 9, 1958	Tucson Open Invitational	66-67-66-66=265	−15	2 strokes	(United States) Don January
3	Nov 20, 1960	Cajun Classic Open Invitational	68-69-66-69=272	−12	2 strokes	(United States) Jon Gustin, (United States) Johnny Pott
4	Jun 3, 1962	Memphis Open Invitational	67-69-64-67=267	−13	Playoff	(United States) Gene Littler, (South Africa) Gary Player
5	Mar 20, 1966	Florida Citrus Open Invitational	71-70-69-69=279	−5	2 strokes	(United States) Charles Coody, (United States) Dick Lytle, (United States) Jack Nicklaus

PGA Tour playoff record (1–1)

No.	Year	Tournament	Opponent(s)	Result
1	1956	St. Petersburg Open	(United States) Mike Fetchick	Lost to par on first extra hole
2	1962	Memphis Open Invitational	(United States) Gene Littler, (South Africa) Gary Player	Won with birdie on first extra hole

== Major championships ==
=== Wins (1) ===
Year	Championship	Winning score	Runner-up
1957	PGA Championship	2 & 1	(United States) Dow Finsterwald

Note: The PGA Championship was match play until 1958

=== Results timeline ===
Tournament	1952	1953	1954	1955	1956	1957	1958	1959
Masters Tournament					T61		T32	39
U.S. Open	CUT	T33	39		CUT		CUT	T28
The Open Championship								
PGA Championship				R32	R16	1	T16	T31

Tournament	1960	1961	1962	1963	1964	1965	1966	1967	1968	1969
Masters Tournament	T9	T30	T20	T39	T32	CUT	WD	T8	T7	T8
U.S. Open	T27	CUT	T23	T14	T21	CUT	CUT			T52
The Open Championship										
PGA Championship	T18	CUT	CUT	CUT	CUT	T49	T64	T14	T30	CUT

Tournament	1970	1971	1972	1973	1974	1975	1976	1977	1978	1979
Masters Tournament	CUT									
U.S. Open	CUT			CUT	CUT					
The Open Championship										
PGA Championship	CUT	WD	T74	CUT	CUT	CUT	CUT	CUT		

Tournament	1980	1981
Masters Tournament		
U.S. Open		
The Open Championship		
PGA Championship		CUT

Win
Top 10
Did not play

CUT = missed the half-way cut
WD = withdrew
R64, R32, R16, QF, SF = Round in which player lost in PGA Championship match play
"T" = tied

=== Summary ===
Tournament	Wins	2nd	3rd	Top-5	Top-10	Top-25	Events	Cuts made
Masters Tournament	0	0	0	0	4	5	14	11
U.S. Open	0	0	0	0	0	3	17	8
The Open Championship	0	0	0	0	0	0	0	0
PGA Championship	1	0	0	1	2	6	24	11
Totals	1	0	0	1	6	14	55	30

- Most consecutive cuts made – 8 ('58 PGA – '61 Masters)
- Longest streak of top-10s – 2 ('56 PGA & '57 PGA)

== U.S. national team appearances ==
- Ryder Cup: 1957

== See also ==
- List of golfers with most PGA Tour wins
- List of men's major championships winning golfers
