= Mike Souchak =

American professional golfer (1927–2008)

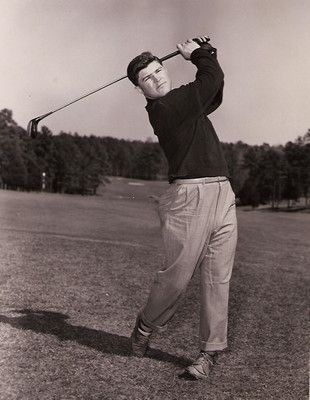

Personal information
- Full name: Michael Souchak
- Nationality: United States
- Born: May 10, 1927 Berwick, Pennsylvania, U.S.
- Died: July 10, 2008 (aged 81) Belleair, Florida, U.S.
- Height: 5 ft 11 in (1.80 m)
- Weight: 215 lb (98 kg; 15.4 st)
- Spouse: Nancy Souchak
- Children: 3 sons, 1 daughter

Career
- Sport: Golf
- College: Duke University
- Turned professional: 1952
- Former tours: PGA Tour; Champions Tour
- Professional wins: At least 19

Number of wins by tour
- PGA Tour: 15

Best results in major championships
- Masters Tournament: T4: 1955
- PGA Championship: T5: 1959
- U.S. Open: T3: 1959, 1960
- The Open Championship: T8: 1956

Achievements and awards
- Duke Sports Hall of Fame: 1976

Michael Souchak (May 10, 1927 – July 10, 2008) was an American professional golfer. He won fifteen events on the PGA Tour in the 1950s and 1960s and represented the United States for the Ryder Cup in 1959 and 1961.

== Early life ==
Born and raised in Berwick, Pennsylvania, Souchak served two years as a gunner in the U.S. Navy. He then attended Duke University in Durham, North Carolina, and played both golf and football for the Blue Devils, as an end and placekicker.

== Professional career ==
In his first win at the 1955 Texas Open, Souchak set and tied several records. In the first round, he tied the tour's 18-hole record with a 60. This record was finally broken in 1977 by Al Geiberger's 59. This first round also included a record-breaking 27 on the back nine holes. This record was not broken until 2006 by Corey Pavin. He then finished with a 72-hole record of 257 (27-under-par). This aggregate total record also stood until the 21st century until Mark Calcavecchia shot 256 at the 2001 Phoenix Open.

Souchak's fifteen PGA Tour wins came between 1955 and 1964, with his best year in 1956 (four victories). He won three tour titles in 1959, and was on an early cover of Sports Illustrated in January 1956, for its preview of the Bing Crosby Pro-Am.

Souchak had eleven top-10 finishes at major championships, including third-place finishes at the U.S. Open in 1959 and 1960. Souchak led after 36 holes in 1960 with a new record score of 135, which was 7-under-par. But he struggled on the final hole of the third round (which was played on the same day as the fourth round,) making a triple bogey, and couldn't regain his composure. Arnold Palmer, who had been seven strokes behind entering the final round, shot 65 to win the championship.

In 1970, Souchak moved from North Carolina to Florida and became the first head pro at the Innisbrook Resort and Golf Club in Palm Harbor, Florida, and resided in Belleair.

Souchak played on the Senior PGA Tour from its inception in 1980 until 1990. His best finish was second place in his very first tournament, the Atlantic City Senior International in 1980.

== Personal life ==
Souchak was married to the former Nancy Tilley (1928–2012). He had four children: sons Mike, Frank, and Chris Souchak and daughter Patti Taylor, as well as five grandchildren. He ran Golf Car Systems, a preventive maintenance firm, with his business partner Bill Dodd until his death from complications of a heart attack in 2008.

== Awards and honors ==
Souchak was inducted into the Duke Sports Hall of Fame in 1976.

== Professional wins (19) ==
=== PGA Tour wins (15) ===
No.	Date	Tournament	Winning score	To par	Margin of victory	Runner(s)-up
1	Feb 20, 1955	Texas Open	60-68-64-65=257	−27	7 strokes	(United States) Fred Haas
2	Feb 27, 1955	Houston Open	70-71-67-65=273	−15	2 strokes	(United States) Jerry Barber
3	Jan 22, 1956	Agua Caliente Open	65-71-74-71=281	−7	2 strokes	(United States) Tommy Bolt
4	Apr 1, 1956	Azalea Open Invitational	70-70-65-68=273	−15	1 stroke	(United States) Dick Mayer
5	May 6, 1956	Colonial National Invitation	74-72-65-69=280	E	1 stroke	(United States) Tommy Bolt
6	Aug 26, 1956	St. Paul Open	70-69-70-62=271	−17	1 stroke	(United States) Sam Snead
7	Aug 17, 1958	St. Paul Open Invitational (2)	66-64-68-65=263	−25	4 strokes	(United States) Julius Boros, (United States) Sam Snead
8	Apr 26, 1959	Tournament of Champions	66-70-68-77=281	−7	2 strokes	(United States) Art Wall Jr.
9	Jul 12, 1959	Western Open	67-67-73-65=272	−8	1 stroke	(United States) Arnold Palmer
10	Aug 16, 1959	Motor City Open	69-63-67-69=268	−16	9 strokes	(United States) Billy Casper, (United States) Doug Ford
11	Jan 31, 1960	San Diego Open Invitational	67-68-67-67=269	−19	1 stroke	(United States) Johnny Pott
12	Jul 4, 1960	Buick Open Invitational	71-68-74-69=282	−6	1 stroke	(United States) Gay Brewer, (United States) Art Wall Jr.
13	Apr 16, 1961	Greater Greensboro Open	70-68-69-69=276	−8	7 strokes	(United States) Sam Snead
14	Apr 19, 1964	Houston Classic (2)	71-69-68-70=278	−6	1 stroke	(United States) Jack Nicklaus
15	May 24, 1964	Memphis Open Invitational	69-65-67-69=270	−10	1 stroke	(United States) Billy Casper, (United States) Tommy Jacobs

PGA Tour playoff record (0–3)

No.	Year	Tournament	Opponent(s)	Result
1	1955	Thunderbird Invitational	(United States) Fred Haas, (United States) Shelley Mayfield	Mayfield won with birdie on second extra hole after 18-hole playoff; Mayfield: −3 (69), Souchak: −3 (69), Haas: −2 (70)
2	1957	Thunderbird Invitational	(United States) Jimmy Demaret, (United States) Ken Venturi	Demaret won 18-hole playoff; Demaret: −4 (67), Souchak: + 4 (75), Venturi: +5 (76)
3	1963	Hot Springs Open Invitational	(United States) Dave Hill	Lost to par on second extra hole

=== Other wins (4) ===
This list is probably incomplete

- 1955 Havana Invitational
- 1959 Carolinas PGA Championship
- 1967 Michigan Open
- 1968 Michigan PGA Championship

== Results in major championships ==
Tournament	1953	1954	1955	1956	1957	1958	1959
Masters Tournament			T4	T17	CUT	T14	T25
U.S. Open	CUT	CUT	T10	T29	CUT	CUT	T3
The Open Championship				T8			
PGA Championship					R16	T8	T5

Tournament	1960	1961	1962	1963	1964	1965	1966	1967	1968	1969
Masters Tournament	T16	T28	T5	T11	T9	T35	T33			
U.S. Open	T3	T4	T14	T32		CUT	CUT			T42
The Open Championship										
PGA Championship	T12	T45	T39	T23	T13	T15	CUT	T20	CUT	T59

Tournament	1970	1971	1972	1973	1974	1975	1976
Masters Tournament							
U.S. Open		CUT					CUT
The Open Championship							CUT
PGA Championship			T29				

Top 10
Did not play

CUT = missed the half-way cut
"T" indicates a tie for a place
R16, QF, SF = Round in which player lost in PGA Championship match play

=== Summary ===
Tournament	Wins	2nd	3rd	Top-5	Top-10	Top-25	Events	Cuts made
Masters Tournament	0	0	0	2	3	8	12	11
U.S. Open	0	0	2	3	4	5	16	8
The Open Championship	0	0	0	0	1	1	2	1
PGA Championship	0	0	0	1	3	8	14	12
Totals	0	0	2	6	11	22	44	32

- Most consecutive cuts made – 19 (1958 PGA – 1965 Masters)
- Longest streak of top-10s – 2 (twice)

== U.S. national team appearances ==
- Ryder Cup: 1959 (winners), 1961 (winners)
- Hopkins Trophy: 1956 (winners)
