= Dow Finsterwald =

American professional golfer (1929–2022)

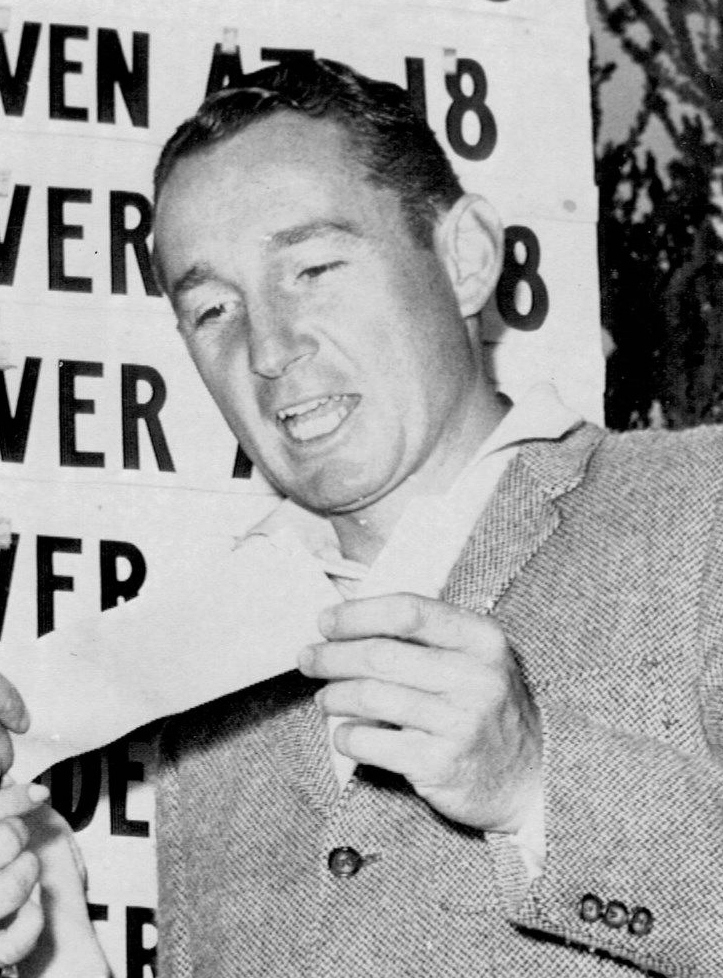
- Finsterwald in 1960

Personal information
- Full name: Dow Henry Finsterwald
- Nationality: United States
- Born: September 6, 1929 Athens, Ohio, U.S.
- Died: November 4, 2022 (aged 93) Colorado Springs, Colorado, U.S.
- Height: 5 ft 11 in (1.80 m)
- Weight: 160 lb (73 kg; 11 st)

Career
- Sport: Golf
- College: Ohio University
- Turned professional: 1951
- Former tours: PGA Tour; Senior PGA Tour
- Professional wins: 13

Number of wins by tour
- PGA Tour: 12
- Other: 1

Best results in major championships (wins: 1)
- Masters Tournament: 3rd: 1960, 1962
- PGA Championship: Won: 1958
- U.S. Open: T3: 1960
- The Open Championship: DNP

Achievements and awards
- Vardon Trophy: 1957
- PGA Player of the Year: 1958

Dow Henry Finsterwald, Sr. (September 6, 1929 – November 4, 2022) was an American professional golfer. He won twelve PGA Tour titles between 1955 and 1963 including the 1958 PGA Championship. He also played on four Ryder Cup teams and served as non-playing captain for the 1977 U.S. Ryder Cup team.

== Early life and amateur career ==
Finsterwald was born and raised in Athens, Ohio. He attended Ohio University in his hometown, where he played on the golf team and graduated in the Class of 1952. He was a member of Beta Theta Pi Fraternity while at OU.

== Professional career ==
Finsterwald turned professional in 1951 and won 11 times on the PGA Tour during his career. He finished fifth or better more than 50 times in his career. He played on four Ryder Cup Teams (1957, 1959, 1961, 1963) and was the non-playing captain of the 1977 team. He won the Vardon Trophy in 1957, which is awarded to the tour professional with the lowest scoring average. In 1958, he was honored as PGA Player of the Year. Finsterwald finished in the money in 72 consecutive tournaments – second only to Byron Nelson's 113 consecutive cuts. This record stood for many years until eclipsed by Jack Nicklaus, Hale Irwin and Tiger Woods; however, he is still fifth on the list as of 2019.

The 1958 PGA Championship was held at Llanerch Country Club in Havertown, Pennsylvania. This was the first PGA Championship held after the format was switched from match play to stroke play. Finsterwald finished the tournament with a two-stroke victory over Billy Casper. Four years later, Finsterwald and Gary Player lost the 1962 Masters in a playoff to Arnold Palmer.

Finsterwald was once involved in litigation in which a plaintiff claimed she lost the sight in her right eye as a result of an errant tee shot he hit at the 18th hole at the 1973 Western Open. A jury found Finsterwald not liable; however, Midlothian (Illinois) Country Club's insurers had to pay the woman about $450,000.

Finsterwald served as director of golf at The Broadmoor in Colorado Springs, Colorado for 28 years. He simultaneously served as PGA of America vice-president from 1976–1978; and on the USGA Rules of Golf committee from 1979-1981. He was also the Pro Emeritus of the Pikewood National Golf Club, based in Morgantown, West Virginia.

== Personal life ==
Finsterwald lived in Orlando, Florida during the winter and Colorado Springs during the summer.

== Awards and honors ==
- In 1969, he was inducted into the Ohio University Athletics Hall of Fame.
- At the 2007 Memorial Tournament in Dublin, Ohio, Finsterwald was honored by fellow Ohio native Jack Nicklaus.
- In 2008, he was inducted into the Colorado Sports Hall of Fame.

== Professional wins (13) ==
=== PGA Tour wins (12) ===
Legend
Major championships (1)
Other PGA Tour (10)

No.	Date	Tournament	Winning score	Margin of victory	Runner(s)-up
1	May 29, 1955	Fort Wayne Invitational	−19 (65-66-71-67=269)	3 strokes	(United States) Doug Ford
2	Jul 3, 1955	British Columbia Open	−18 (67-68-65-70270)	1 stroke	(United States) Bud Holscher
3	May 13, 1956	Carling Open Invitational	−14 (65-71-69-69=274)	3 strokes	(United States) Jack Burke Jr., (United States) Billy Casper, (United States) Billy Maxwell
4	Feb 11, 1957	Tucson Open Invitational	−11 (68-67-66-68=269)	Playoff	(United States) Don Whitt
5	Jul 20, 1958	PGA Championship	−4 (67-72-70-67=276)	2 strokes	(United States) Billy Casper
6	Sep 8, 1958	Utah Open	−17 (69-65-67-66=267)	1 stroke	(United States) Fred Hawkins, (United States) Arnold Palmer
7	Apr 12, 1959	Greater Greensboro Open	−6 (68-68-65-77=278)	2 strokes	(United States) Art Wall Jr.
8	Aug 9, 1959	Carling Open Invitational (2)	−8 (74-68-66-68=276)	1 stroke	(United States) Gene Littler, (United States) Mike Souchak
9	Sep 7, 1959	Kansas City Open Invitational	−13 (68-69-69-69=275)	Playoff	(United States) Don Fairfield
10	Jan 11, 1960	Los Angeles Open	−4 (70-68-71-71=280)	3 strokes	(United States) Bill Collins, (United States) Jay Hebert, (United States) Dave Ragan
11	Apr 24, 1960	Greater New Orleans Open Invitational	−18 (69-66-66-69=270)	6 strokes	(United States) Al Besselink
12	Jun 3, 1963	500 Festival Open Invitation	−16 (68-68-64-68=268)	2 strokes	(United States) Tommy Aaron, (United States) Julius Boros, (United States) Tony Lema, (United States) Bobby Nichols

PGA Tour playoff record (2–4)

No.	Year	Tournament	Opponent(s)	Result
1	1956	Canadian Open	(United States) Doug Sanders	Lost to par on first extra hole
2	1957	Tucson Open Invitational	(United States) Don Whitt	Won 18-hole playoff; Finsterwald: −5 (65), Whitt: −1 (69)
3	1958	Rubber City Open Invitational	(United States) Art Wall Jr.	Lost to birdie on second extra hole
4	1959	Buick Open Invitational	(United States) Art Wall Jr.	Lost 18-hole playoff; Wall: −1 (71), Finsterwald: +1 (73)
5	1959	Kansas City Open Invitational	(United States) Don Fairfield	Won with birdie on first extra hole
6	1962	Masters Tournament	(United States) Arnold Palmer, (South Africa) Gary Player	Palmer won 18-hole playoff; Palmer: −4 (68), Player: −1 (71), Finsterwald: +5 (77)

=== Other wins (1) ===
This list may be incomplete

- 1954 Carolinas Open

== Major championships ==
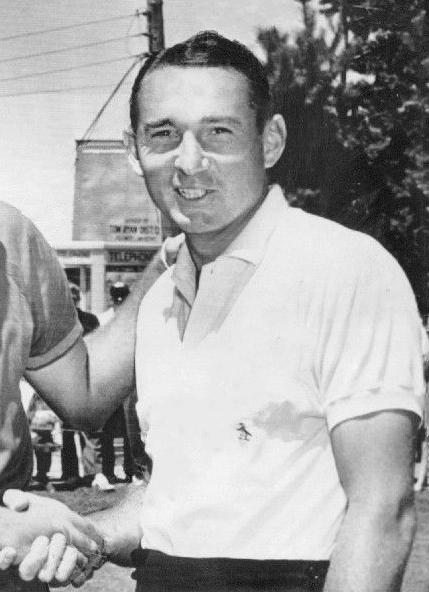
Finsterwald at the 1959 Buick Open

=== Wins (1) ===
Year	Championship	54 holes	Winning score	Margin	Runner-up
1958	PGA Championship	2 shot deficit	−4 (67-72-70-67=276)	2 strokes	(United States) Billy Casper

=== Results timeline ===
Tournament	1950	1951	1952	1953	1954	1955	1956	1957	1958	1959
Masters Tournament		T50	T46				T24	T7	T17	T18
U.S. Open	CUT		CUT			T28		T13		T11
PGA Championship								2	1	4

Tournament	1960	1961	1962	1963	1964	1965	1966	1967	1968	1969
Masters Tournament	3	CUT	3	T5	T9	T21	T57	CUT		
U.S. Open	T3	T6		T12	8	CUT			CUT	T65
PGA Championship	T15	T41	T11	T3	CUT	T63	T12	T60	T48	T76

Tournament	1970	1971	1972	1973	1974	1975	1976	1977	1978	1979
Masters Tournament										
U.S. Open	CUT			CUT						
PGA Championship	CUT	CUT	T58	CUT	CUT	T70		70	CUT	CUT

Tournament	1980	1981	1982	1983	1984
Masters Tournament					
U.S. Open	CUT				
PGA Championship	CUT				CUT

Note: Finsterwald never played in The Open Championship.

Win
Top 10
Did not play

CUT = missed the halfway cut
"T" indicates a tie for a place.

=== Summary ===
Tournament	Wins	2nd	3rd	Top-5	Top-10	Top-25	Events	Cuts made
Masters Tournament	0	0	2	3	5	9	14	12
U.S. Open	0	0	1	1	3	6	15	8
The Open Championship	0	0	0	0	0	0	0	0
PGA Championship	1	1	1	4	4	7	24	15
Totals	1	1	4	8	12	22	53	35

- Most consecutive cuts made – 13 (1955 U.S. Open – 1960 PGA)
- Longest streak of top-10s – 3 (twice)

== U.S. national team appearances ==
Professional

- Ryder Cup: 1957, 1959 (winners), 1961 (winners), 1963 (winners), 1977 (non-playing captain, winners)

== See also ==
- List of men's major championships winning golfers
