= 1965 PGA Championship =

Coordinates: 40.229°N 79.236°W

Tournament information
- Dates: August 12–15, 1965
- Location: Ligonier, Pennsylvania
- Course: Laurel Valley Golf Club
- Organized by: PGA of America
- Tour: PGA Tour

Statistics
- Par: 71
- Length: 7,090 yards (6,483 m)
- Field: 165 players, 77 after cut
- Cut: 151 (+9)
- Prize fund: $149,700
- Winner's share: $25,000

Champion
- (United States) Dave Marr
- 280 (−4)

Location in United States
Location in Pennsylvania

The 1965 PGA Championship was the 47th PGA Championship, played August 12–15 at Laurel Valley Golf Club in Ligonier, Pennsylvania, a suburb southeast of Pittsburgh. Dave Marr won his only major championship, two strokes ahead of runners-up Billy Casper and Jack Nicklaus.

Marr was the co-leader after 54 holes with Tommy Aaron, a stroke ahead of Gardner Dickinson and two shots ahead of major champions Nicklaus and Casper. Aaron shot 78 and Dickinson 74 on Sunday, while Marr matched an even-par 71 with Nicklaus and Casper.

Not far from his hometown of Latrobe, Laurel Valley was co-founded by Arnold Palmer in 1959, who had another disappointing major in his home state and finished 14 strokes back, tied for 33rd. Three years earlier, he lost an 18-hole playoff to Nicklaus in the U.S. Open at Oakmont near Pittsburgh, then finished tied for 17th five weeks later at the PGA Championship at Aronimink, outside Philadelphia. (Palmer won the other two majors of 1962, the Masters and the Open Championship, but never won the PGA Championship for a career grand slam.)

After the practice rounds, a 60-foot (18 m) fir tree was installed on the par-5 third hole to prevent corner-cutting from the tee to an adjacent fairway, over the objections of the club professional.

This was the final PGA Championship appearance for two-time champion Ben Hogan, age 53, who tied for 15th place. After his near-fatal auto accident in early 1949, Hogan's legs could not withstand the grueling match play schedule and he did not play again in the championship until it became a stroke play event. He missed the 54-hole cut by a stroke in 1960 and tied for ninth place in 1964. Hogan won the title as a match play event in 1946 and 1948. Twenty former champions were in the field and twelve made the cut. Palmer was assessed a two-stroke penalty in both of the first two rounds and was at 147 (+5), ten shots back.

A decade later, Laurel Valley hosted the Ryder Cup in 1975, the last Ryder Cup held in the U.S. without players from continental Europe.

== Course layout ==
Hole	1	2	3	4	5	6	7	8	9	Out	10	11	12	13	14	15	16	17	18	In	Total
Yards	440	400	540	431	216	505	375	238	455	3,600	412	535	433	397	190	375	448	230	470	3,490	7,090
Par	4	4	5	4	3	5	4	3	4	36	4	5	4	4	3	4	4	3	4	35	71

== Round summaries ==
=== First round ===
Thursday, August 12, 1965

Place	Player	Score	To par
1	(United States) Tommy Aaron	66	−5
T2	(United States) Gardner Dickinson	67	−4
T2	(United States) Mason Rudolph	67	−4
T4	(Australia) Bruce Devlin	68	−3
T4	(United States) Raymond Floyd	68	−3
T4	(United States) Sam Snead	68	−3
7	(United States) Jack Nicklaus	69	−2
T8	(United States) Billy Casper	70	−1
T8	(United States) Dave Marr	70	−1
T8	(United States) Mike Souchak	70	−1
T8	(United States) Wynsol Spencer	70	−1

=== Second round ===
Friday, August 13, 1965

Place	Player	Score	To par
1	(United States) Tommy Aaron	66-71=137	−5
T2	(United States) Dave Marr	70-69=139	−3
T2	(United States) Jack Nicklaus	69-70=139	−3
4	(United States) Billy Casper	70-70=140	−2
T5	(United States) Gardner Dickinson	67-74=141	−1
T5	(United States) Raymond Floyd	68-73=141	−1
T7	(United States) Don Bies	71-71=142	E
T7	(United States) R. H. Sikes	71-71=142	E
T7	(United States) Mike Souchak	70-72=142	E
T10	(Australia) Bruce Devlin	68-75=143	+1
T10	(United States) Doug Ford	73-70=143	+1
T10	(United States) Mason Rudolph	67-76=143	+1
T10	(United States) Sam Snead	68-75=143	+1

=== Third round ===
Saturday, August 14, 1965

Place	Player	Score	To par
T1	(United States) Tommy Aaron	66-71-72=209	−4
T1	(United States) Dave Marr	70-69-70=209	−4
3	(United States) Gardner Dickinson	67-74-69=210	−3
T4	(United States) Billy Casper	70-70-71=211	−2
T4	(United States) Jack Nicklaus	69-70-72=211	−2
T6	(United States) Raymond Floyd	68-73-72=213	E
T6	(United States) R. H. Sikes	71-71-71=213	E
T6	(United States) Sam Snead	68-75-70=213	E
9	(United States) Bob McCallister	76-68-70=214	+1
10	(Australia) Bruce Devlin	68-75-72=215	+2

=== Final round ===
Sunday, August 15, 1965

Place	Player	Score	To par	Money ($)
1	(United States) Dave Marr	70-69-70-71=280	−4	25,000
T2	(United States) Billy Casper	70-70-71-71=282	−2	12,500
T2	(United States) Jack Nicklaus	69-70-72-71=282	−2	12,500
4	(United States) Bo Wininger	73-72-72-66=283	−1	8,000
5	(United States) Gardner Dickinson	67-74-69-74=284	E	7,000
T6	(Australia) Bruce Devlin	68-75-72-70=285	+1	5,750
T6	(United States) Sam Snead	68-75-70-72=285	+1	5,750
T8	(United States) Tommy Aaron	66-71-72-78=287	+3	4,040
T8	(United States) Jack Burke Jr.	75-71-72-69=287	+3	4,040
T8	(United States) Jacky Cupit	72-76-70-69=287	+3	4,040
T8	(United States) Rod Funseth	75-72-69-71=287	+3	4,040
T8	(United States) Bob McCallister	76-68-70-73=287	+3	4,040

== Television ==
This was the first PGA Championship televised by the ABC network, which retained the broadcast rights through 1990, when it was succeeded by CBS.
