= Dave Marr =

American professional golfer (1933–1997)

Personal information
- Full name: David Francis Marr Jr.
- Nationality: United States
- Born: December 27, 1933 Houston, Texas, U.S.
- Died: October 5, 1997 (aged 63) Houston, Texas, U.S.
- Height: 5 ft 9 in (1.75 m)
- Weight: 160 lb (73 kg; 11 st)

Career
- Sport: Golf
- College: Rice University; University of Houston
- Turned professional: 1953
- Former tour: PGA Tour
- Professional wins: 5

Number of wins by tour
- PGA Tour: 3

Best results in major championships (wins: 1)
- Masters Tournament: T2: 1964
- PGA Championship: Won: 1965
- U.S. Open: T4: 1966
- The Open Championship: T8: 1966

Achievements and awards
- PGA Player of the Year: 1965

David Francis Marr Jr. (December 27, 1933 – October 5, 1997) was an American professional golfer and sportscaster, best known for winning the 1965 PGA Championship.

== Early life and amateur career ==
Marr was born and raised in Houston, Texas, the son of a professional golfer. He attended St. Thomas High School, and while there was on the honor roll, captain of the golf team and member of the Letterman's Club.

Following graduation, he attended Rice Institute and the University of Houston.

== Professional career ==
In 1953, at age 19, Marr left college and turned professional. He began his professional golfing career by accepting a position at Westwood Country Club in Westwood, New Jersey, in 1953. A short time later, Marr took a job as an assistant club pro to Claude Harmon at Winged Foot Golf Club in Mamaroneck, New York, where he began to blossom. He began playing regularly on the PGA tour in 1960, and in that year earned his first professional win at the Sam Snead Festival. A year later, he won the Greater Seattle Open Invitational and then the Azalea Open in 1962. Marr joined the elite in golf world in 1965 when he captured the coveted PGA Championship, was named to the Ryder Cup team and elected PGA Player of the Year.

The 1965 PGA Championship was played at the Laurel Valley Golf Club in Ligonier, Pennsylvania. He defeated golf legends Jack Nicklaus and Billy Casper by two strokes with a four-day total score of 280. Incredibly, this wasn't the biggest news story of the day in the Marr family – a few hours after his victory, his third child, son Tony, was born.

Marr played in the 1965 Ryder Cup, finishing his six matches with a 4-2 record. He was the appointed non-playing captain of the U.S. Ryder Cup team in 1981.

=== Broadcasting career ===
Marr served as a golf analyst for ABC from 1972 until 1991, and was usually teamed with host Jim McKay and fellow one-time PGA Championship winner, Bob Rosburg. He later worked for the BBC in Britain and NBC in the U.S.

Marr and long-time golfing partner Jay Riviere established a golf course architectural and design firm in 1981, and designed many Texas courses and one each in Louisiana and Arizona.

== Death and legacy ==
After a battle with stomach cancer, Marr died at age 63 at the M.D. Anderson Cancer Center in Houston on October 5, 1997.

Marr's children scattered his ashes around the various courses that meant so much to him during his playing days – Royal Birkdale, in England, where he played on the 1965 Ryder Cup team; Walton Heath, also in England, where he captained the 1981 Ryder Cup team; at the 18th hole at Laurel Valley, the site of his 1965 PGA Championship, along with Memorial Park Golf Course in Houston.

Golf executive Bryan Naugle created the Dave Marr Award the year after his death. It is awarded annually in conjunction with the Insperity Invitational. From 1995 through 1997 Marr was a member of the NBC Sports Golf broadcast team covering the US Open, US Amateur and Ryder Cup. Past winners of the Dave Marr Award include Gene Sarazen, Byron Nelson, Jack Nicklaus, Judy Rankin, Gary Player, Former President George H. W. Bush, and Arnold Palmer.

== Personal life ==
Marr was married to Tally. They had five children: sons Dave III, Anthony, Wayne Bunch, Tucker Bunch, and daughter Elizabeth Hallas. Marr's oldest son, Dave III, worked for Golf Channel covering the Champions Tour.

Marr was a close friend of Arnold Palmer. Marr and Palmer were both sons of PGA pros and developed a close bond. Palmer called Marr's 1965 PGA victory "one of the happiest moments of my life," won at Palmer's home course. The two of them used to joke that between them they won a career grand slam. (Palmer won seven majors in his career, but never the PGA Championship, where he was a runner-up three times.)

== Awards and honors ==
- In 1977, Marr was elected to the National Collegiate Hall of Fame.
- In 1978, Marr was inducted into the Texas Golf Hall of Fame.
- In 1980, Marr was selected for the Gold Tee Award presented by the Met (N.Y.) Golf Writers.

== Professional wins (5) ==
=== PGA Tour wins (3) ===
Legend
Major championships (1)
Other PGA Tour (2)

No.	Date	Tournament	Winning score	Margin of victory	Runner(s)-up
1	Sep 17, 1961	Greater Seattle Open Invitational	−15 (67-69-66-63=265)	Playoff	(United States) Jacky Cupit, (United States) Bob Rosburg
2	Apr 1, 1962	Azalea Open	−7 (73-66-71-71=281)	Playoff	(United States) Jerry Steelsmith
3	Aug 15, 1965	PGA Championship	−4 (70-69-70-71=280)	2 strokes	(United States) Billy Casper, (United States) Jack Nicklaus

PGA Tour playoff record (2–0)

No.	Year	Tournament	Opponent(s)	Result
1	1961	Greater Seattle Open Invitational	(United States) Jacky Cupit, (United States) Bob Rosburg	Won with birdie on first extra hole
2	1962	Azalea Open	(United States) Jerry Steelsmith	Won with birdie on first extra hole

=== Other wins (2) ===
- 1960 Sam Snead Festival
- 1962 Metropolitan PGA Championship

== Major championships ==
=== Wins (1) ===
Year	Championship	54 holes	Winning score	Margin	Runners-up
1965	PGA Championship	Tied for lead	−4 (70-69-70-71=280)	2 strokes	(United States) Billy Casper, (United States) Jack Nicklaus

=== Results timeline ===
Tournament	1952	1953	1954	1955	1956	1957	1958	1959
Masters Tournament								
U.S. Open	CUT				CUT	CUT		T15
The Open Championship								
PGA Championship							T44	

Tournament	1960	1961	1962	1963	1964	1965	1966	1967	1968	1969
Masters Tournament	T34		CUT		T2	CUT	CUT	T16	T20	CUT
U.S. Open	T17	CUT		T21		CUT	T4	T9	T32	T10
The Open Championship							T8			
PGA Championship	T10	T22	T51	CUT	65	1	T18	T33	CUT	T48

Tournament	1970	1971	1972	1973
Masters Tournament	CUT			
U.S. Open	T30	CUT	CUT	
The Open Championship	T41		T11	CUT
PGA Championship	T35		CUT	T46

Win
Top 10
Did not play

CUT = missed the half-way cut
"T" = tied

=== Summary ===
Tournament	Wins	2nd	3rd	Top-5	Top-10	Top-25	Events	Cuts made
Masters Tournament	0	1	0	1	1	3	9	4
U.S. Open	0	0	0	1	3	6	15	8
The Open Championship	0	0	0	0	1	2	4	3
PGA Championship	1	0	0	1	1	4	14	11
Totals	1	1	0	3	6	15	42	26

- Most consecutive cuts made – 8 (1966 U.S. Open – 1968 U.S. Open)
- Longest streak of top-10s – 2 (1966 U.S. Open – 1966 Open Championship)

== See also ==
- List of men's major championships winning golfers
