= Mountain View Open =

Golf tournament formerly on the PGA Tour

Tournament information
- Location: Corona, California
- Established: 1964
- Course: Mountain View Country Club
- Par: 71
- Tour: PGA Tour
- Format: Stroke play
- Prize fund: US$40,000
- Month played: October
- Final year: 1964

Tournament record score
- Aggregate: 273 Jack McGowan (1964)
- To par: −11 as above

Final champion
- (United States) Jack McGowan
- Location in the United States Location in California

The Mountain View Open was a golf tournament on the PGA Tour. It was played only one year, 1964, at the Mountain View Country Club in Corona, California. The tournament was won by Jack McGowan, his only PGA Tour win, by four strokes over R. H. Sikes.

== Winners ==
Year	Winner	Score	To par	Margin of victory	Runner-up
1964	(United States) Jack McGowan	273	−11	4 strokes	(United States) R. H. Sikes
