= Al Balding =

Canadian professional golfer (1924–2006)

Personal information
- Full name: Allan George Balding
- Nationality: Canada
- Born: April 29, 1924 Toronto, Ontario, Canada
- Died: July 30, 2006 (aged 82) Mississauga, Ontario, Canada
- Height: 6 ft 2 in (188 cm)
- Weight: 185 lb (84 kg)

Career
- Sport: Golf
- Turned professional: 1950
- Former tours: PGA Tour; Canadian Tour; Champions Tour
- Professional wins: 19

Number of wins by tour
- PGA Tour: 1
- Other: 18

Best results in major championships
- Masters Tournament: T16: 1957
- PGA Championship: DNP
- U.S. Open: T12: 1967
- The Open Championship: T8: 1967

Allan George Balding (April 29, 1924 – July 30, 2006) was a Canadian professional golfer, who won four events on the PGA Tour. In 1955, he became the first Canadian to win a PGA Tour event in the United States; Canadians Ken Black (1936 Vancouver Jubilee Open), Jules Huot (1937 General Brock Open) and Pat Fletcher (1954 Canadian Open) had won PGA Tour events in Canada.

== Early life and amateur career ==
Balding was born in Toronto, Ontario on April 29, 1924. Growing up during the Great Depression, Balding quit school in the 7th grade and began caddying at the nearby Islington golf course, despite not previously golfing before. Balding enlisted in the Canadian Army at 19 during World War II, and saw duty in France and Germany. Balding enlisted thinking that his small stature would land him in the Service Corps, however he was assigned to the 13th Field Battery of the 2nd Artillery division as a driver-mechanic. He was discharged before the end of the war due to a shoulder injury sustained while "fooling around" on a motorcycle. After the war in the late 1940s, Balding worked at a Toronto tire manufacturing company, and later at a golf club in Burlington. He had played golf only occasionally as a youth, but began playing more after the War ended, improving his game rapidly under the instruction of pro Les Franks.

== Professional career ==
In 1950, Balding became a professional golfer working as a club professional in Toronto. He won his first minor tournament at the age of 26, the Ontario assistant pro championship.

Balding began on the Canadian Professional Golf Tour, winning his first two tournaments in 1952. In 1955, Balding became the first Canadian to win a PGA Tour event in the United States, when he won the Mayfair Open. In 1957, Balding decided to play full time on the U.S. tour, winning three events on the tour and finished 6th on the money list with $28,000, the highest of any Canadian at that point, and would not be eclipsed until Mike Weir finished 6th on the money list in 2003.

Balding would go on to win an impressive number of tournaments in many different venues over a long period of time during his career. He won ten significant events in Canada from 1952 through 1973. He won four tournaments on the PGA Tour, the most of any Canadian to that point. In 1968, in Italy, he won the World Cup team title for Canada (with George Knudson), as well as the individual title.

Balding's career was slowed by several health issues, requiring shoulder surgery in 1965, and being diagnosed with blood cancer in the 1970s. Balding was also very critical of the Canadian golf establishment in the 1970s, noting that there were fewer Canadians on the U.S. tour in the 1970s then when he was active in the 1950s and 1960s.

He was one of the 40 original seniors on the U.S. Senior PGA Tour in 1980.

Perhaps the most remarkable win of Balding's career came at the age of 76, when he captured the 2000 Canadian PGA Senior Championship, giving him professional victories in six different decades; this was attained against players as young as age 50.

== Personal life ==
Balding was the uncle of Canadian auto racing driver Kat Teasdale.

In 2006, Balding died in Mississauga, Ontario from cancer.

== Awards and honors ==
- In 1955 and 1957, Balding was named Ontario Athlete of the Year.
- In 1968, Balding was elected to Canada's Sports Hall of Fame.
- In 1984, Balding was inducted into the Canadian Golf Hall of Fame.
- In 1997, Balding was inducted into the Ontario Sports Hall of Fame.
- Balding Court, a street on the former St. Andrew's Golf Club in Toronto is named in his honour (it is north of York Mills Road, between Yonge Street and Bayview Avenue).

== Professional wins (19) ==
=== PGA Tour wins (1) ===
No.	Date	Tournament	Winning score	Margin of victory	Runner(s)-up
1	Dec 18, 1955	Mayfair Inn Open	−11 (69-66-64-70=269)	1 stroke	(United States) Ed Oliver, (United States) Mike Souchak

PGA Tour playoff record (0–3)

No.	Year	Tournament	Opponent(s)	Result
1	1959	Memphis Open	(South Africa) Gary Player, (United States) Don Whitt	Whitt won with par on second extra hole Balding eliminated by birdie on first hole
2	1961	San Diego Open Invitational	(United States) Arnold Palmer	Lost to birdie on first extra hole
3	1964	Fresno Open Invitational	(Canada) George Knudson	Lost to birdie on second extra hole

=== Canadian wins (11) ===
- 1952 (2) Quebec Open, Canadian Match Play
- 1954 (1) Canadian Match Play
- 1955 (1) Canadian PGA Championship
- 1956 (1) Canadian PGA Championship
- 1958 (1) Canadian Match Play
- 1961 (1) Canadian Match Play
- 1963 (1) Canadian PGA Championship
- 1970 (1) Canadian PGA Championship
- 1973 (1) Alberta Open
- 2000 (1) Canadian PGA Seniors' Championship

=== Other wins (7) ===
- 1957 Miami Beach Open, West Palm Beach Open Invitational, Havana Invitational
- 1963 Mexican Open
- 1968 World Cup (team event with George Knudson and individual event)
- 1994 Liberty Mutual Legends of Golf - Demaret Division (with Jay Hebert)

== Results in major championships ==
Tournament	1956	1957	1958	1959	1960	1961	1962	1963	1964	1965	1966	1967	1968	1969	1970
Masters Tournament	T29	T16	T26			27	24	CUT	CUT				CUT		
U.S. Open				T32			T43	T32				T12	T43	T42	T18
The Open Championship	T17											T8	9		

Note: Balding never played in the PGA Championship.

Top 10
Did not play

CUT = missed the half-way cut
"T" indicates a tie for a place

=== Summary ===
Tournament	Wins	2nd	3rd	Top-5	Top-10	Top-25	Events	Cuts made
Masters Tournament	0	0	0	0	0	2	8	5
U.S. Open	0	0	0	0	0	2	7	7
The Open Championship	0	0	0	0	2	3	3	3
PGA Championship	0	0	0	0	0	0	0	0
Totals	0	0	0	0	2	7	18	15

- Most consecutive cuts made – 8 (1956 Masters – 1962 U.S. Open)
- Longest streak of top-10s – 1 (twice)

== Team appearances ==
- World Cup (representing Canada): 1956, 1957, 1958, 1959, 1960, 1961, 1963, 1964, 1967, 1968 (winners, individual winner), 1969, 1970
- Hopkins Trophy (representing Canada): 1955, 1956
