= Holy Sepulchre Cemetery (Hayward, California) =

Catholic cemetery in Alameda County, California

Coordinates: 37°38′56″N 122°3′50″W

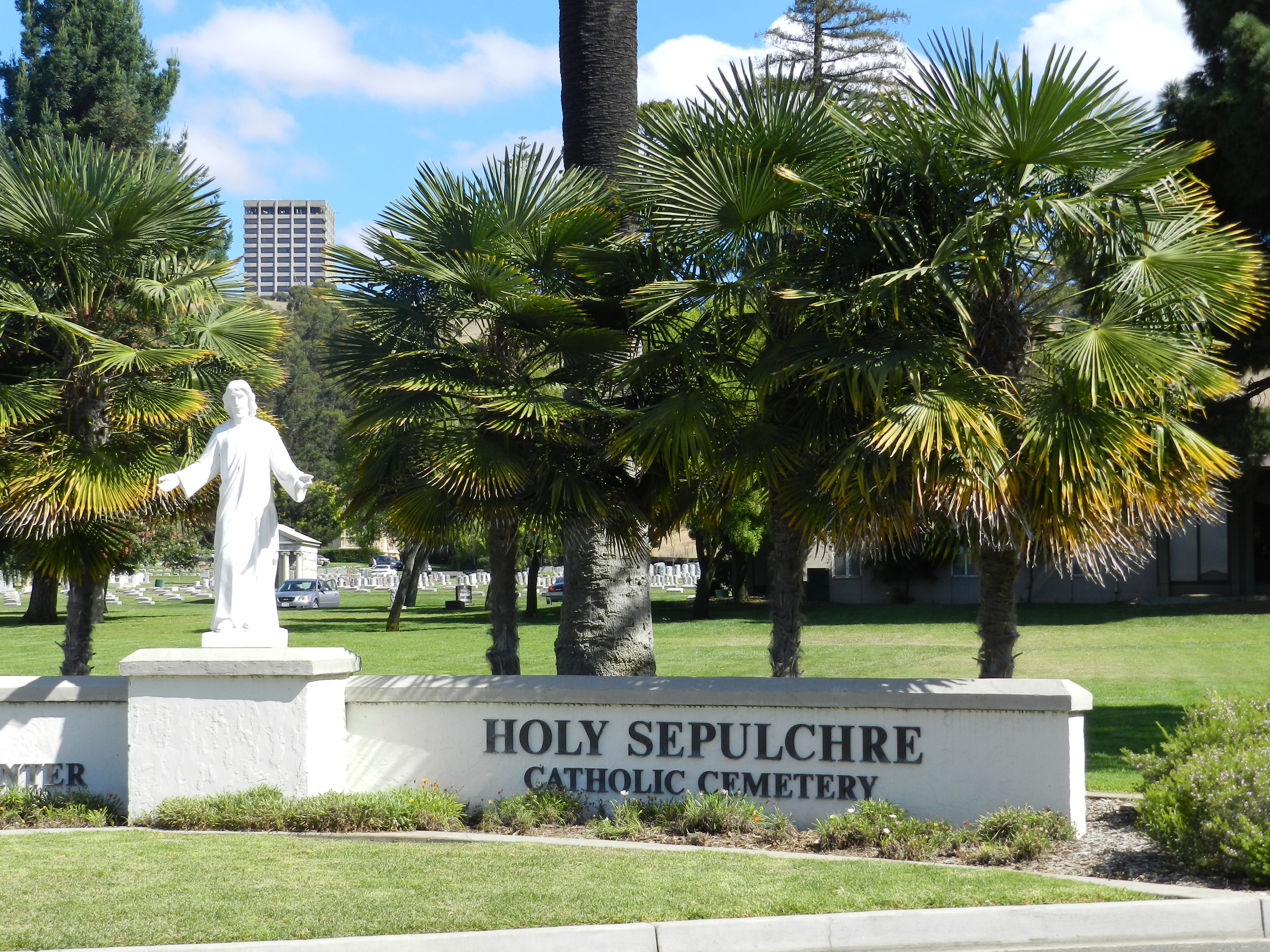
Holy Sepulchre Cemetery, with Warren Hall, California State University, East Bay in background

Holy Sepulchre Cemetery is a cemetery in Hayward, California. It is a Catholic cemetery run by the Roman Catholic Diocese of Oakland, which also operates the Holy Angels Funeral and Cremation Center at the same location. It was the first Catholic Church-owned funeral home in the U.S.

The cemetery planted 3 acres of vineyards to provide grapes for sacramental wine used by the Oakland Diocese. The wine is bottled at Rockwall Winery in Alameda, which also sources grapes from Holy Cross Cemetery in Antioch, and St. Joseph's Cemetery in San Pablo. The cemetery vineyards are believed to be the only such vineyards in the United States.

== Notable burials ==
- Chauncey Bailey, murdered Oakland-based journalist
- Del Courtney, big band leader and local TV personality
- Eddie Lake, Major League Baseball shortstop
- Tony Lema, golfer, winner of the 1964 British Open
- Fran Ryan, character actress
- Jackie Tobin (1921–1982), Major League Baseball infielder
- John H. Tolan, U.S. Representative from California
- There is one British Commonwealth war grave in this cemetery: Captain John Joseph Kerwin, Royal Air Force Ferry Command (died 1941).

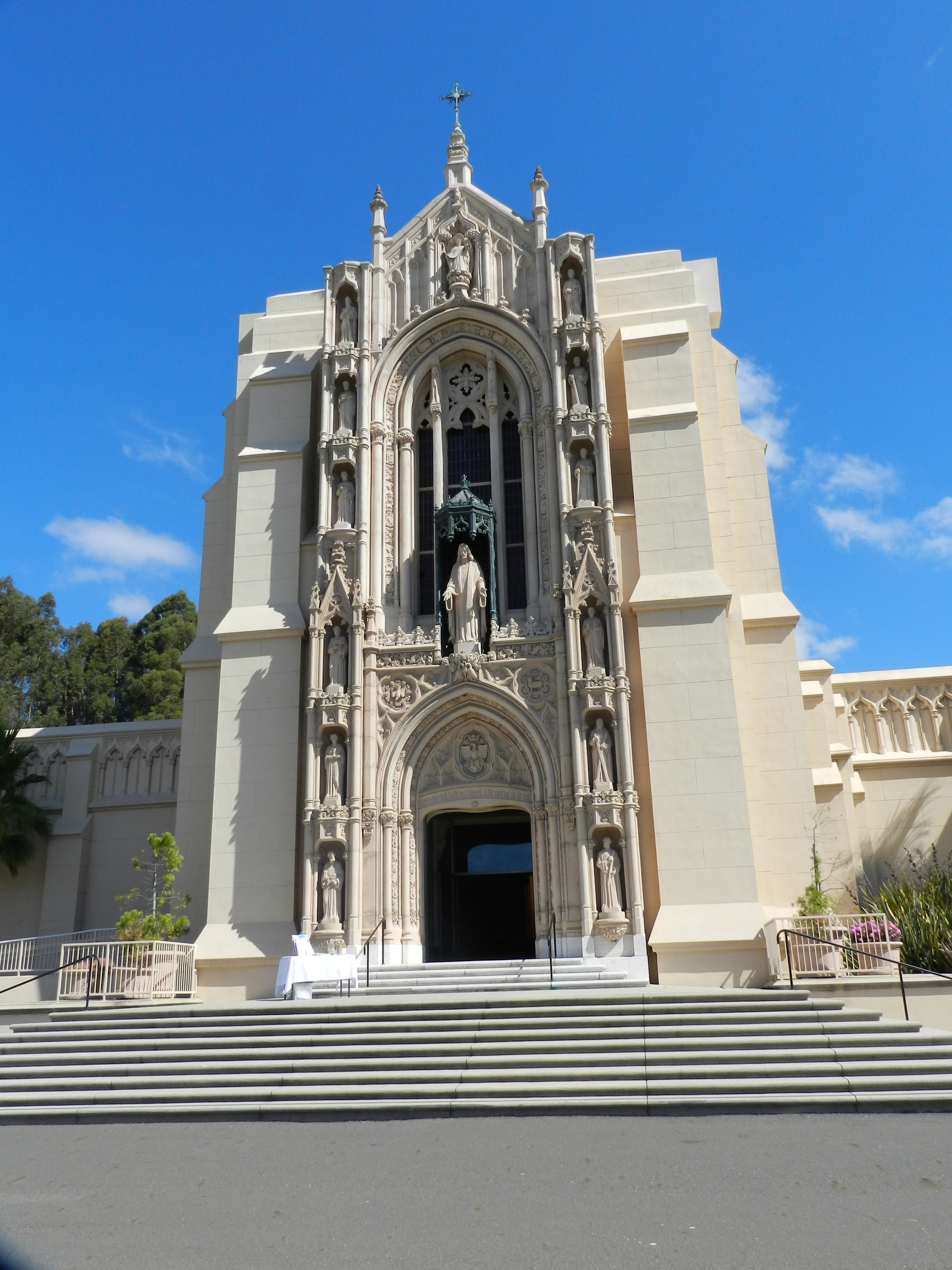
Main mausoleum at the cemetery
