= George Knudson =

Canadian professional golfer

Personal information
- Full name: George Alfred Christian Knudson
- Nickname: The Mantis
- Nationality: Canada
- Born: June 28, 1937 Winnipeg, Manitoba, Canada
- Died: January 24, 1989 (aged 51) Toronto, Ontario, Canada
- Height: 5 ft 10 in (178 cm)
- Weight: 160 lb (73 kg; 11 st)

Career
- Sport: Golf
- Turned professional: 1958
- Former tours: Canadian Tour; PGA Tour
- Professional wins: 30

Number of wins by tour
- PGA Tour: 8
- Other: 22

Best results in major championships
- Masters Tournament: T2: 1969
- PGA Championship: T20: 1965
- U.S. Open: T17: 1965
- The Open Championship: DNP

George Alfred Christian Knudson, CM (June 28, 1937 – January 24, 1989) was a Canadian professional golfer, who along with Mike Weir holds the record for the Canadian with the most wins on the PGA Tour, with eight career victories.

== Early life and amateur career ==
Knudson was born and raised in Winnipeg, Manitoba. He learned to play golf at the St. Charles Country Club. He won the 1954 and 1955 Manitoba Junior Championships. In addition, he won the 1955 Canadian Junior Championship.

== Professional career ==
In 1958, Knudson moved to Toronto and worked at the Oakdale Golf & Country Club where he received instruction and encouragement from the Club, to improve his game; the club has named one of its three nines after him. He was then able to secure some financial backing to try the PGA Tour. He won the Manitoba Open in 1958, 1959, and 1960, and the Ontario Open in 1960, 1961, 1971, 1976 and 1978.

Between 1961 and 1972, he won eight tournaments on the PGA Tour. He won the Canadian PGA Championship five times, and won the World Cup with Al Balding in 1968.

Knudson's last official PGA TOUR victory was the Kaiser Invitational in October 1972. However, Knudson nearly won again the next week at the Sahara Invitational. He carried the lead going into the final round at 15-under par after shooting 65-70-66, but a final round 76 dropped him into a T-7th at 11-under.

In seven Masters appearances, Knudson posted three top-10s, including 10th in his 1965 debut and sixth a year later. Knudson's best finish in a major championship was a tie for second in the 1969 Masters Tournament, one shot behind champion George Archer. Knudson's birdie putt on the 72nd hole to tie Archer came up 3 inches short.

Knudson left tournament golf in the late 1970s, and started teaching golf, with success, at a facility in the Toronto area. His teaching methods have since been adopted by the Canadian PGA.

== Death ==
Knudson had long been a heavy smoker and was diagnosed with lung cancer in 1987. He recovered well enough to compete at the 1988 Liberty Mutual Legends of Golf senior tournament. Shortly thereafter, it was discovered the cancer had spread to his brain. George Knudson died in January 1989 at age 51 and was buried at Mount Pleasant Cemetery in Toronto.

== Awards and honors ==
- In 1969, Knudson was inducted into Canada's Sports Hall of Fame.
- In 1988, Knudson was inducted into both Royal Canadian Golf Association Hall of Fame and the Manitoba Sports Hall of Fame and Museum
- In 1988, he was also made a member of the Order of Canada.
- In 1996, he was inducted into the Ontario Sports Hall of Fame.

== Amateur wins ==
- 1954 Manitoba Junior Championship
- 1955 Manitoba Junior Championship, Canadian Junior Championship

== Professional wins (30) ==
=== PGA Tour wins (8) ===
No.	Date	Tournament	Winning score	To par	Margin of victory	Runner(s)-up
1	Dec 10, 1961	Coral Gables Open Invitational	65-71-71-66=273	−11	1 stroke	(United States) Gay Brewer
2	Sep 22, 1963	Portland Open Invitational	69-67-68-67=271	−17	Playoff	(United States) Mason Rudolph
3	Oct 4, 1964	Fresno Open Invitational	73-69-71-67=280	−8	Playoff	(Canada) Al Balding
4	May 14, 1967	Greater New Orleans Open Invitational	71-66-70-70=277	−11	1 stroke	(United States) Jack Nicklaus
5	Feb 18, 1968	Phoenix Open Invitational	67-64-70-71=272	−12	3 strokes	(United States) Julius Boros, (United States) Sam Carmichael, (United States) Jack Montgomery
6	Feb 25, 1968	Tucson Open Invitational	70-67-71-65=273	−15	1 stroke	(United States) Frank Beard, (United States) Frank Boynton
7	Sep 20, 1970	Robinson Open Golf Classic	67-69-69-63=268	−16	Playoff	(United States) George Archer
8	Oct 22, 1972	Kaiser International Open Invitational	66-69-66-70=271	−17	3 strokes	(United States) Hale Irwin, (United States) Bobby Nichols

PGA Tour playoff record (3–0)

No.	Year	Tournament	Opponent	Result
1	1963	Portland Open Invitational	(United States) Mason Rudolph	Won with eagle on first extra hole
2	1964	Fresno Open Invitational	(Canada) Al Balding	Won with birdie on second extra hole
3	1970	Robinson Open Golf Classic	(United States) George Archer	Won with par on fourth extra hole

=== Canadian wins (16) ===
This list may be incomplete

- 1958 Manitoba Open
- 1959 Manitoba Open
- 1960 Manitoba Open, Ontario Open
- 1961 Ontario Open
- 1964 Canadian PGA Championship
- 1966 Millar Trophy
- 1967 Canadian PGA Championship
- 1968 Canadian PGA Championship
- 1971 Ontario Open
- 1976 Canadian PGA Championship
- 1976 Ontario Open
- 1977 Canadian PGA Championship, Shrine Pro-Am (shared with Dan Halldorson and Gar Hamilton)
- 1978 Ontario Open, Shrine Pro-Am

=== Latin American wins (4) ===
- 1962 Maracaibo Open Invitational, Puerto Rico Open
- 1963 Panama Open
- 1964 Caracas Open

=== Other wins (3) ===
- 1966 Canada Cup (individual trophy)
- 1968 World Cup (team event with Al Balding)
- 1969 Wills Masters (Australia)

== Results in major championships ==
Tournament	1962	1963	1964	1965	1966	1967	1968	1969	1970	1971	1972	1973	1974
Masters Tournament				10	T6	T31	T28	T2	T45			CUT	
U.S. Open				T17	T44			T36	T61				T51
PGA Championship	T51		T28	T20	T43			T25	T55	CUT	CUT	T56	

Note: Knudson never played in The Open Championship.

Top 10
Did not play

CUT = missed the half-way cut
"T" indicates a tie for a place

=== Summary ===
Tournament	Wins	2nd	3rd	Top-5	Top-10	Top-25	Events	Cuts made
Masters Tournament	0	1	0	1	3	3	7	6
U.S. Open	0	0	0	0	0	1	5	5
The Open Championship	0	0	0	0	0	0	0	0
PGA Championship	0	0	0	0	0	2	9	7
Totals	0	1	0	1	3	6	21	18

- Most consecutive cuts made – 16 (1962 PGA – 1970 PGA)
- Longest streak of top-10s – 1 (three times)

== Team appearances ==
Amateur

- Americas Cup (representing Canada): 1956

Professional

- World Cup (representing Canada): 1962, 1964, 1965, 1966 (individual winner), 1967, 1968 (winners), 1969, 1976, 1977

== Bibliography ==
- The Natural Golf Swing (ISBN 0-7710-4534-4), with Lorne Rubenstein.
