= Ligonier Historic District (Ligonier, Pennsylvania) =

Historic district in Pennsylvania, United States

- U.S. National Register of Historic Places
- U.S. Historic district
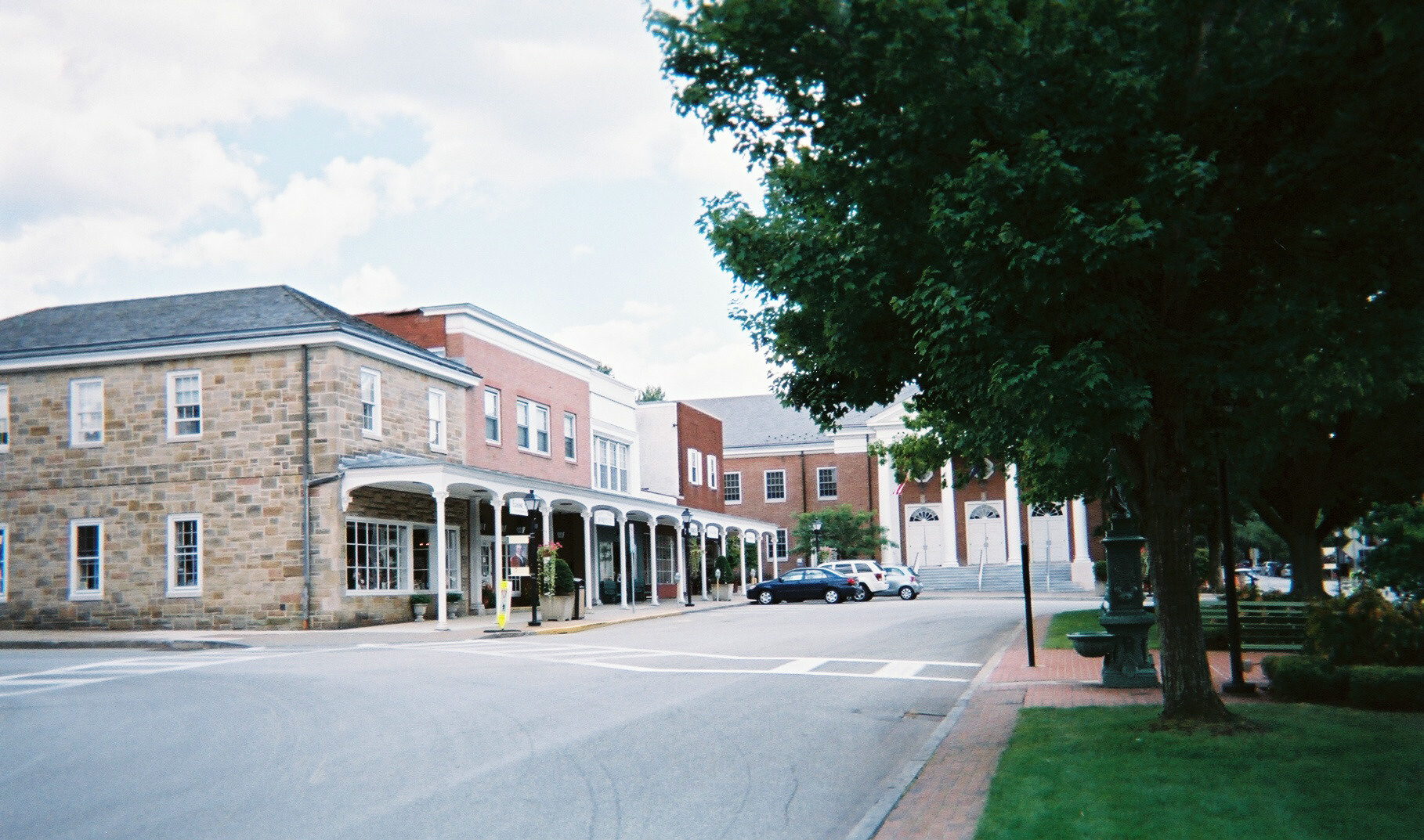
- Downtown Ligonier, August 2008

- Location within Pennsylvania Location within the United States
- Location: Jct. of Main and Market Sts., Ligonier, Pennsylvania
- Coordinates: 40°14′35″N 79°14′16″W
- Area: 166 acres (67 ha)
- Architect: McWilliams, J. F.
- Architectural style: Federal, Late Victorian, Late 19th And Early 20th Century American Movements
- NRHP reference No.: 94001054
- Added to NRHP: August 30, 1994

The Ligonier Historic District is a national historic district that is located in Ligonier, Westmoreland County, Pennsylvania.

It was added to the National Register of Historic Places in 1994.

== History and architectural features ==
This district encompasses 419 contributing buildings, two contributing sites, one contributing structure, and one contributing object that are located in the central business district and surrounding residential areas of Ligonier. They were built roughly between 1790 and 1944, and include a mix of residential, commercial, institutional, and industrial properties. Designed in a variety of popular architectural styles, including Federal and Late Victorian, notable buildings include the E.T. Weller House (1907), Ligonier Valley Railroad Station (1909), United Presbyterian (Pioneer) Church (1876), Covenant Presbyterian Church (1902), Heritage United Methodist Church (1903), and the former Municipal Building (1937). The district also includes the separately listed Fort Ligonier Site and demolished Ligonier Armory.

== Gallery ==
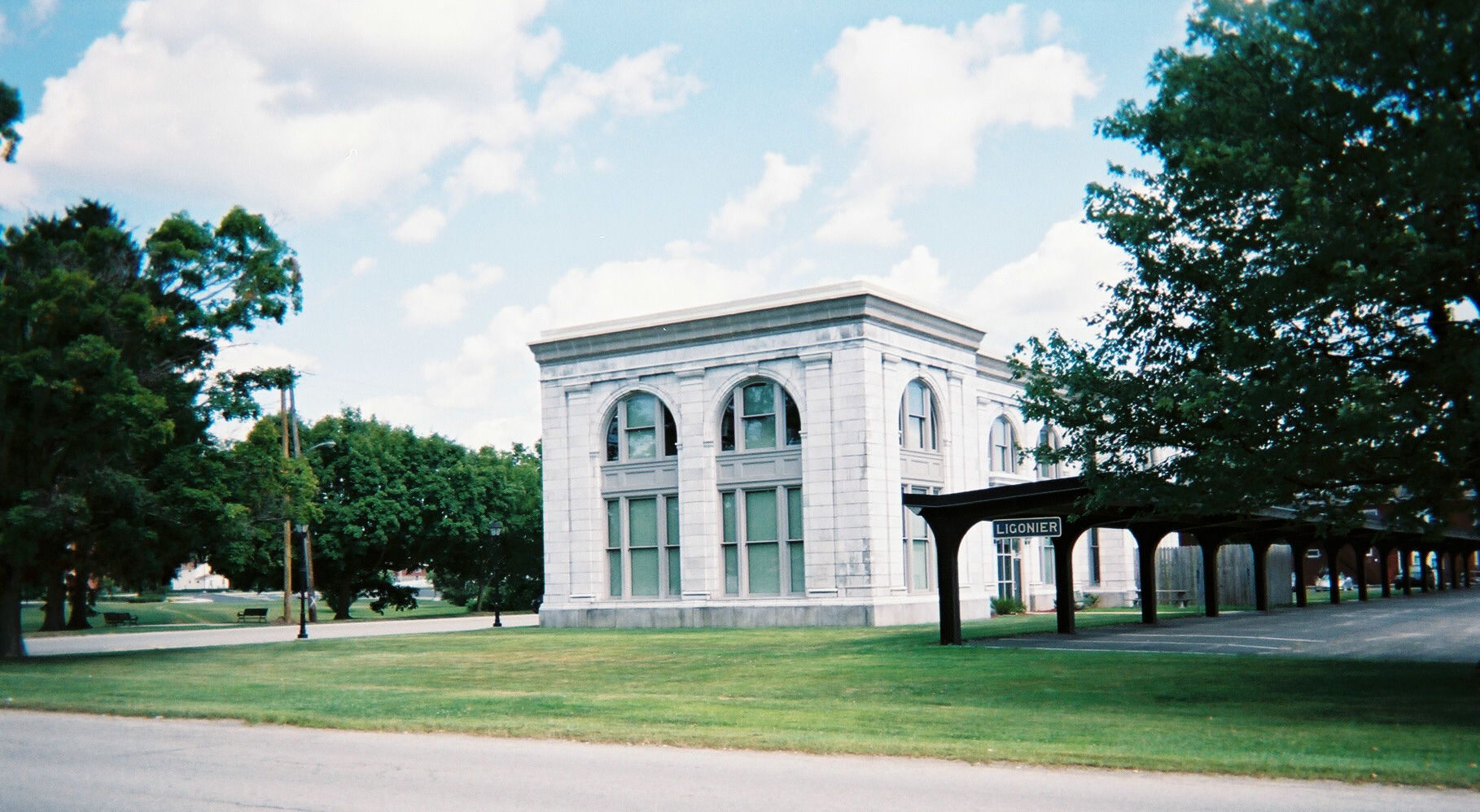
former Ligonier Valley Railroad Station, August 2008
