= Jack McGowan (golfer) =

American golfer (1930–2001)

Personal information
- Full name: John W. McGowan
- Nationality: United States
- Born: December 18, 1930 Concord, New Hampshire
- Died: February 15, 2001 (aged 70)
- Height: 5 ft 9.5 in (1.77 m)
- Weight: 140 lb (64 kg; 10 st)

Career
- Sport: Golf
- Turned professional: 1954
- Former tour: PGA Tour
- Professional wins: 1

Number of wins by tour
- PGA Tour: 1

Best results in major championships
- Masters Tournament: T42: 1965
- PGA Championship: T43: 1961
- The Open Championship: DNP

John W. "Jack" McGowan (December 18, 1930 – February 15, 2001) was an American professional golfer.

== Career ==
McGowan was born in Concord, New Hampshire. He turned professional in 1954 and joined the PGA Tour in 1961.

He played on the PGA Tour through 1970, winning one event, the 1964 Mountain View Open among 32 top-10 finishes. He had four runner-up finishes: 1964 St. Paul Open Invitational to Chuck Courtney, 1964 Sahara Invitational to R. H. Sikes, 1965 Western Open to Billy Casper, and 1969 Texas Open Invitational to Deane Beman.

== Professional wins (1) ==
=== PGA Tour wins (1) ===
No.	Date	Tournament	Winning score	Margin of victory	Runner-up
1	Oct 25, 1964	Mountain View Open	−11 (66-68-65-74=273)	4 strokes	(United States) R. H. Sikes

PGA Tour playoff record (0–1)

No.	Year	Tournament	Opponent	Result
1	1969	Texas Open Invitational	(United States) Deane Beman	Lost to birdie on first extra hole
