= Bob McCallister =

American professional golfer (1934–2021)

Personal information
- Full name: Donald Robert McCallister
- Nationality: United States
- Born: May 3, 1934 Toledo, Ohio, U.S.
- Died: January 26, 2021 (aged 86) Molalla, Oregon, U.S.
- Height: 6 ft 0 in (1.83 m)
- Weight: 180 lb (82 kg; 13 st)
- Spouse: Carol
- Children: 8

Career
- Sport: Golf
- College: University of Southern California
- Turned professional: 1959
- Former tours: PGA Tour; Senior PGA Tour
- Professional wins: 5

Number of wins by tour
- PGA Tour: 2
- Other: 3

Best results in major championships
- Masters Tournament: CUT: 1966
- PGA Championship: T8: 1965
- U.S. Open: T21: 1963
- The Open Championship: DNP

Donald Robert McCallister (May 3, 1934 – January 26, 2021) was an American professional golfer. He won two events on the PGA Tour and three other tournaments in the 1960s. He later worked as the head pro at golf clubs in California and Oregon, and competed on the Senior PGA Tour. McCallister played for the University of Southern California golf team as an amateur, receiving All-American honors from 1956 to 1958, and becoming the first player to win the Pac-8 Conference and Southern California Intercollegiate Athletic Conference titles in consecutive years. He turned professional in 1959 and played full-time on the tour after serving in the U.S. Army. He retired from the tour in 1969 after being affected by early onset arthritis.

== Early life and amateur career ==
McCallister was born in Toledo, Ohio, on May 3, 1934. The McCallister family moved to Corona, California, and joined the San Gabriel Country Club. He started playing golf when he was 14 years old, after his father Don urged him to try the sport.

McCallister was awarded a scholarship to attend the University of Southern California. There he earned All-American honors three times as a member of the golf team – first-team in 1956 and 1957, third-team in 1958. He was the first (and, at the time of his death, the only) player to win both the Pac-8 Conference and Southern California Intercollegiate Athletic Conference titles in back-to-back seasons.

After college he served in the U.S. Army and being stationed at Fort Ord in Monterey Bay. He established a record of shooting a score of 62 at the base golf course which has stood for over sixty years. During this period, McCallister entered several PGA Tour events as an amateur.

== Professional career ==
In 1959, McCallister turned professional. During his time on the tour, McCallister was sponsored by Lawrence Welk. He won the first title of his professional career at the 1960 Paul Bunyan Open, held at the Penobscot Valley Golf Club in Orono, Maine. He finished ahead of Tony Lema and won $2,000 in prize money.

McCallister won two PGA Tour events during his career, both of which played in California in October. His first title came at the 1961 Orange County Open Invitational. He came from behind by five strokes on the final day to defeat Al Geiberger, his friend and former college teammate. On the final hole, he hit a 35-foot (11 m) birdie to finish ahead by two shots.

McCallister did not win any events during the 1962 PGA Tour. He was runner-up at that year's Phoenix Open, finishing 12 shots behind winner Arnold Palmer. He subsequently tied for third in attempting to defend his Orange County Open title, coming two shots short of a playoff between Bob Rosburg and Lema (the eventual winner) after three-putting on the last hole. That same year, he partnered with Major League Baseball player Albie Pearson to win the Bing Crosby Pro-Am. He finished the season 44th on the money list.

McCallister's second win came at the only incarnation of the Sunset-Camellia Open Invitational in 1964. He finished ahead of both Pete Brown and Stan Leonard by a single stroke to win $3,300. His best finish in a major came at the 1965 PGA Championship, when he finished tied for eighth place.

McCallister was afflicted by an early onset of arthritis around 1964, which seriously restricted his physical ability. He managed to play five more seasons before retiring in 1969. During this time, he won three tournaments outside of the PGA Tour. He triumphed at the Mexican Open and Southern California PGA Championship in 1966. In the former, he defeated Dudley Wysong by one shot, hitting a 21-foot (6.4 m) birdie on the last hole. In the latter, he beat Bud Holscher to the $15,000 first prize, which was the richest sectional event by the Professional Golfers' Association of America at the time. McCallister won the 1967 Maracaibo Open Invitational by defeating Wes Ellis in a playoff, after the latter tied the score on the final hole of normal play.

McCallister played on the Senior PGA Tour after reaching the age of 50. He played a total of 16 events on that tour from 1984 to 1987 and made his last appearance at the GTE Northwest Classic in 1995. He also teamed up with Lon Hinkle for the Shootout at Jeremy Ranch. McCallister established the Redding (California) Area Junior Golf Association, and held the position of head pro at Charbonneau Golf Club in Wilsonville, Oregon, as well as at the Butte Creek Country Club in Chico and Gold Hills Country Club in Redding.

== Personal life ==
McCallister was married to Carol until his death. He had eight children: Kim, Bill, Michael, Tracy, Bobby, Brent, Heather, and Missy. He died on January 26, 2021, in Molalla, Oregon. He was 86, and suffered from Parkinson's disease in the twelve years leading up to his death.

== Professional wins (5) ==
=== PGA Tour wins (2) ===
No.	Date	Tournament	Winning score	Margin of victory	Runners-up
1	October 22, 1961	Orange County Open Invitational	−6 (69-70-73-66=278)	2 strokes	(United States) Jacky Cupit, (United States) Don Fairfield, (United States) Marty Furgol, (United States) Al Geiberger, (United States) Phil Rodgers
2	October 11, 1964	Sunset-Camellia Open Invitational	−3 (69-71-71-70=281)	1 stroke	(United States) Pete Brown, (Canada) Stan Leonard

=== Other wins (3) ===
- 1966 Mexican Open, Southern California PGA Championship
- 1967 Maracaibo Open Invitational

== Results in major championships ==
Tournament	1951	1952	1953	1954	1955	1956	1957	1958	1959
Masters Tournament									
U.S. Open	CUT								
PGA Championship									

Tournament	1960	1961	1962	1963	1964	1965	1966	1967	1968
Masters Tournament							CUT		
U.S. Open			T38	T21	CUT		CUT	T42	CUT
PGA Championship			T11	T49		T8	T58		

Top 10
Did not play

CUT = missed the half-way cut
"T" = tied
Note: McCallister never played in The Open Championship.

== Results in senior major championships ==
Tournament	1984	1985	1986	1987
Senior PGA Championship				T47
Senior Players Championship	51			
U.S. Senior Open		T52		

"T" = tied
Note: McCallister never played in The Tradition or The Senior Open Championship.
