= 1963 PGA Tour =

Golf tour season

1963 PGA Tour season
- Duration: January 4, 1963 – November 24, 1963
- Number of official events: 44
- Most wins: (United States) Arnold Palmer (7)
- Money list: (United States) Arnold Palmer
- PGA Player of the Year: (United States) Julius Boros

The 1963 PGA Tour was the 48th season of the PGA Tour, the main professional golf tour in the United States.

== Schedule ==
The following table lists official events during the 1963 season.

Date	Tournament	Location	Purse (US$)	Winner (Note: The number in parentheses after each winner's name is the number of PGA Tour events they had won up to and including that tournament. This information is only shown for PGA Tour members.)	Notes
Jan 7	Los Angeles Open	California	50,000	(United States) Arnold Palmer (36)	
Jan 13	San Diego Open Invitational	California	25,000	(South Africa) Gary Player (7)	
Jan 20	Bing Crosby National Pro-Am	California	50,000	(United States) Billy Casper (19)	Pro-Am
Jan 27	Lucky International Open	California	50,000	(United States) Jack Burke Jr. (16)	
Feb 4	Palm Springs Golf Classic	California	50,000	(United States) Jack Nicklaus (4)	Pro-Am
Feb 12	Phoenix Open Invitational	Arizona	35,000	(United States) Arnold Palmer (37)	
Feb 17	Tucson Open Invitational	Arizona	25,000	(United States) Don January (4)	
Mar 4	Greater New Orleans Open Invitational	Louisiana	40,000	(United States) Bo Wininger (6)	
Mar 10	Pensacola Open Invitational	Florida	25,000	(United States) Arnold Palmer (38)	
Mar 17	St. Petersburg Open Invitational	Florida	25,000	(United States) Raymond Floyd (1)	
Mar 24	Doral C.C. Open Invitational	Florida	50,000	(United States) Dan Sikes (1)	
Mar 31	Azalea Open	North Carolina	20,000	(United States) Jerry Barber (7)	
Apr 7	Masters Tournament	Georgia	112,500	(United States) Jack Nicklaus (5)	Major championship
Apr 14	Greater Greensboro Open	North Carolina	35,000	(United States) Doug Sanders (12)	
Apr 21	Houston Classic	Texas	50,000	(New Zealand) Bob Charles (1)	
Apr 28	Texas Open Invitational	Texas	30,000	(United States) Phil Rodgers (3)	
May 5	Tournament of Champions	Nevada	60,000	(United States) Jack Nicklaus (6)	Winners-only event
May 5	Waco Turner Open	Oklahoma	20,000	(United States) Gay Brewer (4)	Alternate event
May 12	Colonial National Invitation	Texas	60,000	(United States) Julius Boros (10)	Invitational
May 19	Oklahoma City Open Invitational	Oklahoma	35,000	(United States) Don Fairfield (3)	
May 27	Memphis Open Invitational	Tennessee	50,000	(United States) Tony Lema (4)	
Jun 3	500 Festival Open Invitation	Indiana	55,000	(United States) Dow Finsterwald (11)	
Jun 9	Buick Open Invitational	Michigan	50,000	(United States) Julius Boros (11)	
Jun 16	Thunderbird Classic Invitational	New York	100,000	(United States) Arnold Palmer (39)	
Jun 23	U.S. Open	Massachusetts	90,000	(United States) Julius Boros (12)	Major championship
Jul 1	Cleveland Open Invitational	Ohio	110,000	(United States) Arnold Palmer (40)	New tournament
Jul 6	Canadian Open	Canada	50,000	(United States) Doug Ford (19)	
Jul 13	The Open Championship	England	£8,500	(New Zealand) Bob Charles (2)	Major championship (Note: Unofficial money event at the time, but retrospectively counted as an official win.)
Jul 14	Hot Springs Open Invitational	Arkansas	25,000	(United States) Dave Hill (3)	Alternate event
Jul 21	PGA Championship	Texas	80,000	(United States) Jack Nicklaus (7)	Major championship
Jul 29	Western Open	Illinois	55,000	(United States) Arnold Palmer (41)	
Aug 4	St. Paul Open Invitational	Minnesota	35,000	(United States) Jack Rule Jr. (1)	
Aug 18	Insurance City Open Invitational	Connecticut	40,000	(United States) Billy Casper (20)	
Aug 25	American Golf Classic	Ohio	50,000	(United States) Johnny Pott (4)	
Sep 1	Denver Open Invitational	Colorado	35,000	(United States) Chi-Chi Rodríguez (1)	
Sep 8	Utah Open	Utah	40,000	(United States) Tommy Jacobs (3)	
Sep 15	Seattle Open Invitational	Washington	35,000	(United States) Bobby Nichols (3)	
Sep 22	Portland Open Invitational	Oregon	30,000	(Canada) George Knudson (2)	
Oct 6	Whitemarsh Open Invitational	Pennsylvania	125,000	(United States) Arnold Palmer (42)	New tournament
Oct 20	Sahara Invitational	Nevada	70,000	(United States) Jack Nicklaus (8)	
Oct 27	Fig Garden Village Open Invitational	California	25,000	(United States) Mason Rudolph (2)	New tournament
Nov 3	Almaden Open Invitational	California	25,000	(United States) Al Geiberger (2)	
Nov 10	Frank Sinatra Open Invitational	California	50,000	(United States) Frank Beard (1)	New tournament
Nov 24	Cajun Classic Open Invitational	Louisiana	20,000	(United States) Rex Baxter (1)	

=== Unofficial events ===
The following events were sanctioned by the PGA Tour, but did not carry official money, nor were wins official.

Date	Tournament	Location	Purse ($)	Winner(s)	Notes
Oct 13	Ryder Cup	Georgia	n/a	Team USA	Team event
Oct 28	Canada Cup	France	n/a	(United States) Jack Nicklaus and (United States) Arnold Palmer	Team event
Oct 28	Canada Cup Individual Trophy	France	n/a	(United States) Jack Nicklaus	

== Money list ==
The money list was based on prize money won during the season, calculated in U.S. dollars.

Position	Player	Prize money ($)
1	(United States) Arnold Palmer	128,230
2	(United States) Jack Nicklaus	100,050
3	(United States) Julius Boros	77,357
4	(United States) Tony Lema	67,113
5	(South Africa) Gary Player	55,455
6	(United States) Dow Finsterwald	49,863
7	(United States) Mason Rudolph	39,120
8	(United States) Al Geiberger	34,126
9	(United States) Don January	33,755
10	(United States) Bobby Nichols	33,605

== Awards ==
Award	Winner	Ref.
PGA Player of the Year	(United States) Julius Boros	
Scoring leader (Vardon Trophy)	(United States) Billy Casper	
