= Chuck Courtney (golfer) =

American professional golfer (born 1940)

Personal information
- Full name: Charles Courtney
- Nationality: United States
- Born: October 11, 1940 (age 86) Minneapolis, Minnesota, U.S.
- Height: 5 ft 10 in (1.78 m)
- Weight: 160 lb (73 kg; 11 st)

Career
- Sport: Golf
- College: San Diego State University
- Turned professional: 1963
- Former tour: PGA Tour
- Professional wins: 4

Number of wins by tour
- PGA Tour: 2
- Other: 2

Best results in major championships
- Masters Tournament: DNP
- PGA Championship: T22: 1971
- U.S. Open: T46: 1971
- The Open Championship: DNP

Charles Courtney (born October 11, 1940) is an American professional golfer who played on the PGA Tour in the 1960s and 1970s.

== Early life ==
Courtney was born in Minneapolis, Minnesota. He was raised in San Diego, California. He attended San Diego State University, where he was a three-time All-American as a member of the golf team: second team in 1960 and 1961, first team in 1962.

== Professional career ==
In 1963, Courtney turned professional. For more than a decade, he played on the PGA Tour, where he had two wins and more than two dozen top-10 finishes. He was the head professional at Rancho Santa Fe Golf Club in Rancho Santa Fe, California for two decades starting in 1983. He is now golf professional emeritus.

== Awards and honors ==
- From 1960 to 1962, Courtney earned All-American honors at San Diego State University
- Courtney was inducted into the San Diego State University Athletics Hall of Fame in 1991

== Amateur wins ==
- 1958 San Diego City Amateur
- 1960 San Diego City Amateur
- 1960 San Diego County Open

== Professional wins (4) ==
=== PGA Tour wins (2) ===
| No. | Date | Tournament | Winning score | Margin of victory | Runners-up |
|---|---|---|---|---|---|
| 1 | Aug 16, 1964 | St. Paul Open Invitational | −12 (68-72-66-66=272) | 3 strokes | (United States) Rod Funseth, (United States) Jack McGowan, (United States) Charlie Sifford |
| 2 | Apr 20, 1969 | Tallahassee Open Invitational | −6 (72-69-71-70=282) | 1 stroke | (United States) Jacky Cupit, (United States) Bert Greene, (Australia) Bob Shaw |

PGA Tour playoff record (0–1)

| No. | Year | Tournament | Opponent | Result |
|---|---|---|---|---|
| 1 | 1972 | Southern Open | (United States) DeWitt Weaver | Lost to par on first extra hole |

=== Other wins (2) ===
- 1965 Montebello Open
- 1967 Puerto Rico Open
