= Jackie Tobin =

American baseball player (1921–1982)

- Third baseman
- Born: January 8, 1921; Oakland, California, U.S.
- Died: January 18, 1982 (aged 61); Oakland, California, U.S.
- Batted: Left Threw: Right

MLB debut
- April 20, 1945, for the Boston Red Sox

Last MLB appearance
- September 30, 1945, for the Boston Red Sox

MLB statistics
- Batting average: .252
- Home runs: 0
- Runs batted in: 21
- Stats at Baseball Reference

Teams
- Boston Red Sox (1945)

John Patrick Tobin (January 8, 1921 – January 18, 1982) was an American professional baseball player who appeared in 84 games, primarily as a third baseman, during his one season in Major League Baseball for the 1945 Boston Red Sox. Born in Oakland, California, he batted left-handed, threw right-handed, and was listed as 6 feet (1.8 m) tall and 165 pounds (75 kg). His brother Jim was a major league pitcher from 1937 to 1945.

Tobin attended Saint Mary's College of California. His pro career began in 1942 in the Red Sox' organization, then he was called to World War II military service and joined the United States Navy, missing the 1943 and 1944 seasons. In 1945, the last wartime season, he debuted with the American League Red Sox on April 19 as a pinch hitter; his brother, meanwhile, was entering his sixth and final year as member of Boston's National League team, the Braves. Jackie Tobin went on to start 70 games at third base for the Red Sox and collected 70 hits; but only eight were for extra bases — six doubles and two triples. He batted .252 with 21 runs batted in.

The Red Sox sent Tobin to the minor leagues in 1946, where from 1948 through 1957 he carved out a successful career in the Pacific Coast League, mostly as an outfielder. In 1953, he had 210 hits (184 of them singles) in 178 games for the Seattle Rainiers. He retired after the 1957 campaign and 14 professional seasons.

Tobin died in Oakland at age 61 on January 18, 1982. He is interred at Holy Sepulchre Cemetery, Hayward.
