= Orange County Open Invitational =

Golf tournament formerly on the PGA Tour

Tournament information
- Location: Costa Mesa, California
- Established: 1959
- Course: Mesa Verde Country Club
- Par: 71
- Tour: PGA Tour
- Format: Stroke play
- Prize fund: US$20,000
- Month played: October
- Final year: 1962

Tournament record score
- Aggregate: 267 Bob Rosburg (1962); 267 Tony Lema (1962)
- To par: −17 as above

Final champion
- (United States) Tony Lema
- Location in the United States Location in California

The Orange County Open Invitational was a PGA Tour event that was played for four years at Mesa Verde Country Club in Costa Mesa, California during the late 1950s and early 1960s.

Construction began on the championship course at Mesa Verde Country Club in 1958 under the supervision of golf course designer William Francis Bell, and was officially opened in January 1959. Later that same year, the inaugural Orange County Open took place, which was won by Jay Hebert. The first permanent clubhouse was in place for the second event by the time Billy Casper took the trophy. The fourth and final tournament was held in 1962, and was won by Tony Lema after a grueling three-hole sudden death playoff with Bob Rosburg. Lema celebrated his victory by providing free champagne to members of the press in the clubhouse, a promise he had made the day before contingent upon winning. As a result of this and Lema's dashing good looks, the press dubbed him Champagne Tony from that day forth.

== Winners ==
Year	Winner	Score	To par	Margin of victory	Runner(s)-up
1962	(United States) Tony Lema	267	−17	Playoff	(United States) Bob Rosburg
1961	(United States) Bob McCallister	278	−6	2 strokes	(United States) Jacky Cupit (United States) Don Fairfield (United States) Marty Furgol (United States) Al Geiberger (United States) Phil Rodgers
1960	(United States) Billy Casper	276	−8	1 stroke	(United States) Charlie Sifford
1959	(United States) Jay Hebert	273	−11	2 strokes	(United States) Jack Fleck (Canada) Jerry Magee
