= McGinnis Hospital =

Coordinates: 40.24401°N 79.24003°W

Geography
- Location: 221 W. Main St. Ligonier, Pennsylvania, USA, 15212

Organisation
- Type: Former
- Affiliated university: Excela Health

History
- Opened: 1944
- Closed: 2011

McGinnis Hospital is a former hospital in Ligonier, Pennsylvania. Founded by the Sisters of Mercy of Allegheny County, Pennsylvania in 1944 when they purchased the 1918 family mansion, the structure served as a hospital for the next 67 years and even included a pool. It was the smallest hospital in Pennsylvania. It was closed in 2011, with plans to open an 8-room hotel in the building in July 2013.

As of 2021, McGinnis Hospital has been reformed into a company named Myriam's Table Café & Catering.
