= Golden Gate Championship =

Golf tournament formerly on the PGA Tour

Tournament information
- Location: San Francisco, California
- Established: 1959
- Course: Harding Park Golf Club
- Par: 71
- Tour: PGA Tour
- Format: Stroke play
- Prize fund: US$45,000
- Month played: September
- Final year: 1959

Tournament record score
- Aggregate: 275 Mason Rudolph (1959)
- To par: –9 as above

Final champion
- (United States) Mason Rudolph
- Location in the United States Location in California

The Golden Gate Championship was a golf tournament on the PGA Tour that was played in September 1959 at San Francisco's storied Harding Park Golf Club.

The event was won by Mason Rudolph, a 25-year-old Tennessean by two strokes over Dow Finsterwald and Bob Goalby. It was his first victory on the PGA Tour.

== Winners ==
Year	Winner	Score	To par	Margin of victory	Runners-up
1959	(United States) Mason Rudolph	275	−9	2 strokes	(United States) Dow Finsterwald (United States) Bob Goalby
