= 1964 PGA Tour =

Golf tour season

1964 PGA Tour season
- Duration: January 3, 1964 – November 22, 1964
- Number of official events: 44
- Most wins: (United States) Tony Lema (5)
- Money list: (United States) Jack Nicklaus
- PGA Player of the Year: (United States) Ken Venturi

The 1964 PGA Tour was the 49th season of the PGA Tour, the main professional golf tour in the United States.

== Schedule ==
The following table lists official events during the 1964 season.

Date	Tournament	Location	Purse (US$)	Winner (Note: The number in parentheses after each winner's name is the number of PGA Tour events they had won up to and including that tournament. This information is only shown for PGA Tour members.)	Notes
Jan 6	Los Angeles Open	California	50,000	(United States) Paul Harney (4)	
Jan 12	San Diego Open Invitational	California	30,000	(United States) Art Wall Jr. (12)	
Jan 19	Bing Crosby National Pro-Am	California	60,000	(United States) Tony Lema (5)	Pro-Am
Jan 27	Lucky International Open	California	50,000	(United States) Chi-Chi Rodríguez (2)	
Feb 2	Palm Springs Golf Classic	California	50,000	(United States) Tommy Jacobs (4)	Pro-Am
Feb 9	Phoenix Open Invitational	Arizona	50,000	(United States) Jack Nicklaus (9)	
Feb 16	Tucson Open Invitational	Arizona	30,000	(United States) Jacky Cupit (3)	
Mar 2	Greater New Orleans Open Invitational	Louisiana	50,000	(United States) Mason Rudolph (3)	
Mar 9	Pensacola Open Invitational	Florida	30,000	(South Africa) Gary Player (8)	
Mar 15	St. Petersburg Open Invitational	Florida	25,000	(Australia) Bruce Devlin (1)	
Mar 22	Doral Open Invitational	Florida	50,000	(United States) Billy Casper (21)	
Mar 30	Azalea Open	North Carolina	20,000	(United States) Al Besselink (4)	
Apr 5	Greater Greensboro Open	North Carolina	45,000	(United States) Julius Boros (13)	
Apr 12	Masters Tournament	Georgia	130,000	(United States) Arnold Palmer (43)	Major championship
Apr 19	Houston Classic	Texas	50,000	(United States) Mike Souchak (14)	
Apr 26	Texas Open Invitational	Texas	40,000	(Australia) Bruce Crampton (3)	
May 3	Tournament of Champions	Nevada	65,000	(United States) Jack Nicklaus (10)	Winners-only event
May 3	Waco Turner Open	Oklahoma	20,000	(United States) Pete Brown (1)	Alternate event
May 10	Colonial National Invitation	Texas	75,000	(United States) Billy Casper (22)	Invitational
May 18	Oklahoma City Open Invitational	Oklahoma	40,000	(United States) Arnold Palmer (44)	
May 24	Memphis Open Invitational	Tennessee	50,000	(United States) Mike Souchak (15)	
May 31	500 Festival Open Invitation	Indiana	70,000	(South Africa) Gary Player (9)	
Jun 7	Thunderbird Classic	New York	100,000	(United States) Tony Lema (6)	
Jun 14	Buick Open Invitational	Michigan	60,000	(United States) Tony Lema (7)	
Jun 20	U.S. Open	Maryland	88,000	(United States) Ken Venturi (11)	Major championship
Jun 28	Cleveland Open Invitational	Ohio	100,000	(United States) Tony Lema (8)	
Jul 5	Whitemarsh Open Invitational	Pennsylvania	25,000	(United States) Jack Nicklaus (11)	
Jul 10	The Open Championship	Scotland	£8,500	(United States) Tony Lema (9)	Major championship (Note: Unofficial money event at the time, but retrospectively counted as an official win.)
Jul 19	PGA Championship	Ohio	100,000	(United States) Bobby Nichols (4)	Major championship
Jul 26	Insurance City Open Invitational	Connecticut	50,000	(United States) Ken Venturi (12)	
Aug 2	Canadian Open	Canada	50,000	(Australia) Kel Nagle (2)	
Aug 9	Western Open	Illinois	65,000	(United States) Chi-Chi Rodríguez (3)	
Aug 16	St. Paul Open Invitational	Minnesota	65,000	(United States) Chuck Courtney (1)	
Aug 23	American Golf Classic	Ohio	50,000	(United States) Ken Venturi (13)	
Aug 30	Carling World Open	Michigan	200,000	(United States) Bobby Nichols (5)	
Sep 7	Dallas Open Invitational	Texas	40,000	(United States) Charles Coody (1)	
Sep 20	Portland Open Invitational	Oregon	40,000	(United States) Jack Nicklaus (12)	
Sep 27	Greater Seattle Open Invitational	Washington	40,000	(United States) Billy Casper (23)	
Oct 4	Fresno Open Invitational	California	35,000	(Canada) George Knudson (3)	
Oct 11	Sunset-Camellia Open Invitational	California	25,000	(United States) Bob McCallister (2)	New tournament
Oct 18	Sahara Invitational	Nevada	70,000	(United States) R. H. Sikes (1)	
Oct 25	Mountain View Open	California	40,000	(United States) Jack McGowan (1)	New tournament
Nov 3	Almaden Open Invitational	California	25,000	(United States) Billy Casper (24)	
Nov 22	Cajun Classic Open Invitational	Louisiana	25,000	(United States) Miller Barber (1)	

=== Unofficial events ===
The following events were sanctioned by the PGA Tour, but did not carry official money, nor were wins official.

Date	Tournament	Location	Purse ($)	Winner(s)	Notes
Dec 6	Canada Cup	Hawaii	n/a	(United States) Jack Nicklaus and (United States) Arnold Palmer	Team event
Dec 6	Canada Cup Individual Trophy	Hawaii	n/a	(United States) Jack Nicklaus	

== Money list ==
The money list was based on prize money won during the season, calculated in U.S. dollars.

Position	Player	Prize money ($)
1	(United States) Jack Nicklaus	113,285
2	(United States) Arnold Palmer	113,203
3	(United States) Billy Casper	90,130
4	(United States) Tony Lema	74,130
5	(United States) Bobby Nichols	74,013
6	(United States) Ken Venturi	62,466
7	(South Africa) Gary Player	61,450
8	(United States) Mason Rudolph	52,569
9	(United States) Chi-Chi Rodríguez	49,339
10	(United States) Mike Souchak	39,559

== Awards ==
Award	Winner	Ref.
PGA Player of the Year	(United States) Ken Venturi	
Scoring leader (Vardon Trophy)	(United States) Arnold Palmer	
