= Laurel Valley Golf Club =

Golf club in Ligonier, Pennsylvania

Coordinates: 40.229°N 79.236°W

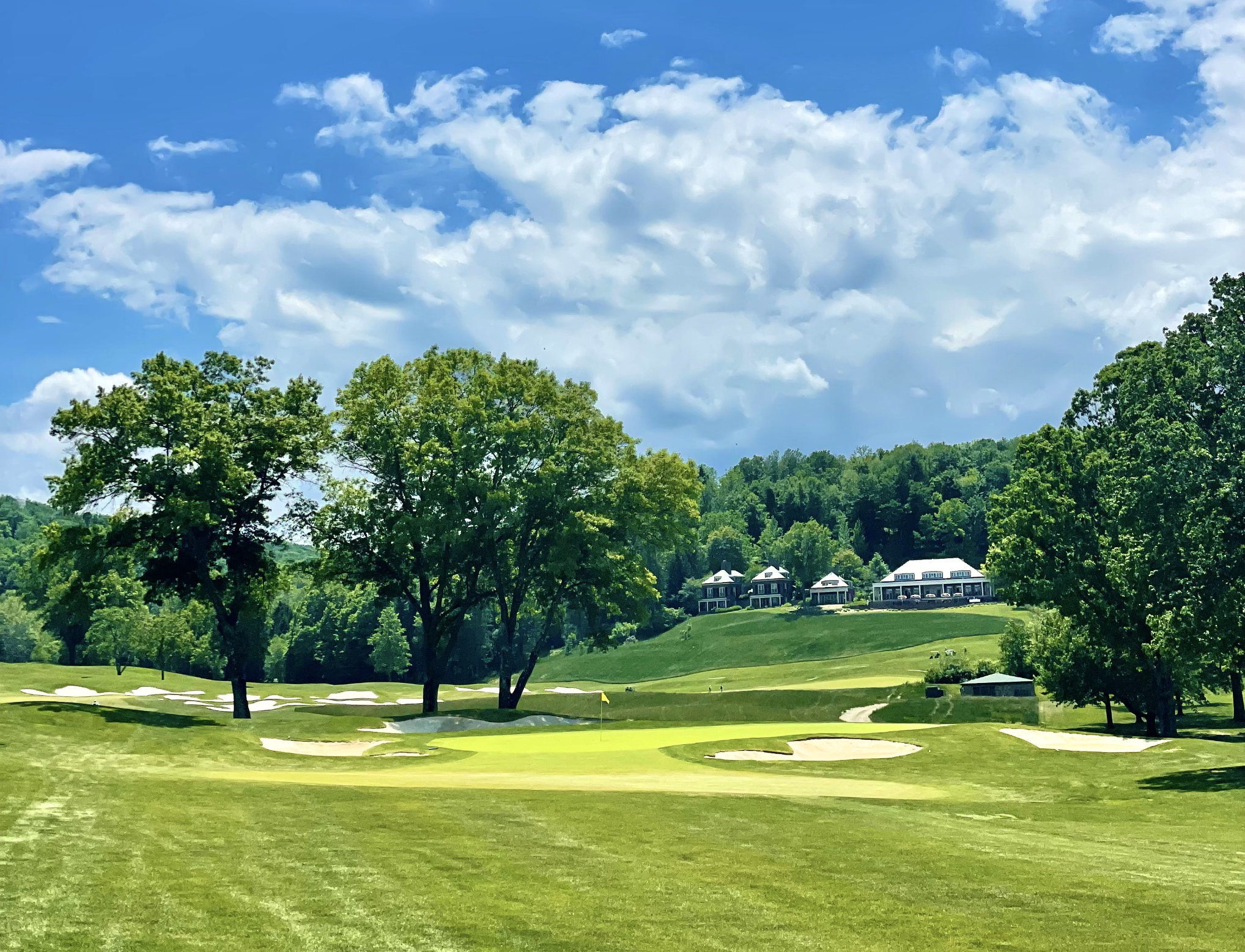
- Interactive map of Laurel Valley Golf Club

Club information
- Location: Ligonier Township, Westmoreland County, near Ligonier, Pennsylvania
- Established: 1959
- Type: Private
- Tota holes: 18
- Tournaments: PGA Championship (1965)

Laurel Valley
- Designed by: Dick Wilson Arnold Palmer
- Par: 71
- Length: 7,154
- Course rating: 75.9

The Laurel Valley Golf Club is an American golf club that is located just south of the Pittsburgh suburb of Ligonier, Pennsylvania.

== History and notable features ==
Designed by Dick Wilson and renovated by Arnold Palmer, the Laurel Valley golf course opened in 1959. Since that time, the club has hosted two notable tournaments: the 1965 PGA Championship and the 1975 Ryder Cup.

Other tournaments played here include the 1989 U.S. Senior Open, the 2001 Marconi Pennsylvania Classic and the 2005 Senior PGA Championship. The 2023 Arnold Palmer Cup was also held at Laurel Valley.

== Honors and other awards ==
Laurel Valley was ranked the 4th best golf course in Pennsylvania by Golf Digest.

== Gallery ==
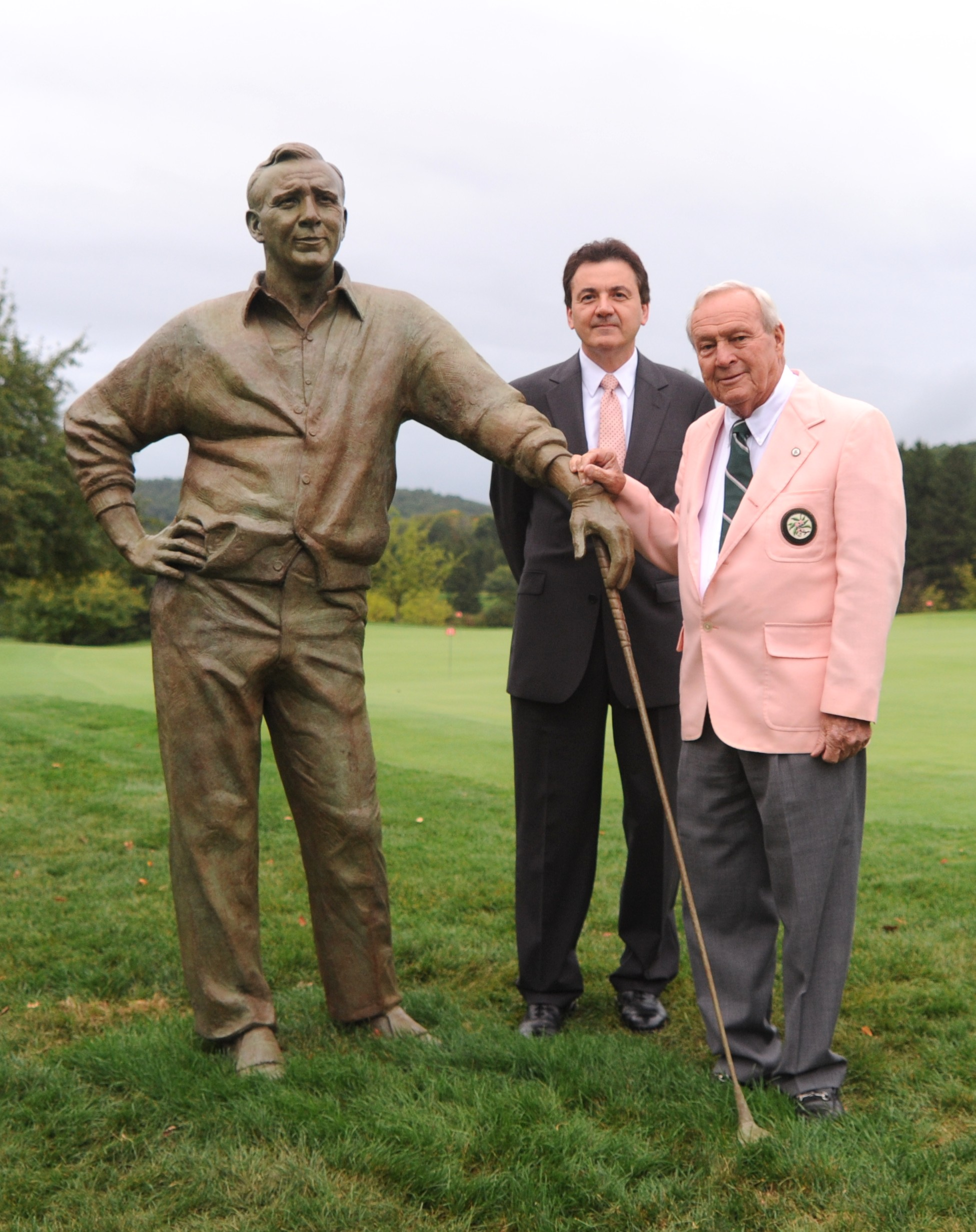
Sculptor Zenos Frudakis with his Arnold Palmer sculpture, Laurel Valley Golf Course
