= Fig Garden Village Open Invitational =

Golf tournament formerly on the PGA Tour

Fresno Open Invitational
Tournament information
- Location: Fresno, California
- Established: 1963
- Course: San Joaquin Country Club
- Par: 72
- Tour: PGA Tour
- Format: Stroke play
- Prize fund: US$35,000
- Month played: October
- Final year: 1964

Tournament record score
- Aggregate: 275 Mason Rudolph (1963)
- To par: −13 as above

Final champion
- (Canada) George Knudson

Location map
- Location in the United States Location in California

The Fig Garden Village Open Invitational was a golf tournament on the PGA Tour that was played at the San Joaquin Country Club in Fresno, California. It was first held in October 1963, and was won by Mason Rudolph, a 29-year-old native of Tennessee by three strokes over Tommy Aaron and Al Geiberger. In 1964, it was called the Fresno Open Invitational and was again played at San Joaquin CC with Canadian George Knudson the winner in a playoff with fellow Canadian Al Balding.

== Winner ==
Year	Winner	Score	To par	Margin of victory	Runner(s)-up
Fresno Open Invitational
1964	(Canada) George Knudson	280	−8	Playoff	(Canada) Al Balding
Fig Garden Village Open Invitational
1963	(United States) Mason Rudolph	275	−13	3 strokes	(United States) Tommy Aaron (United States) Al Geiberger
