= Braemar Golf Course =

Public golf course in Edina, Minnesota

- Interactive map of Braemar Golf Course
- 44°52′N 93°23′W

Club information
- Location: Edina, Minnesota, United States
- Established: 1964
- Type: Public
- Owner: City of Edina
- Tota holes: 27
- Tournaments: Minnesota Golf Classic (1969); U.S. Women's Amateur Public Links (1979)
- Website: braemargolf.com

Championship
- Designed by: Richard Mandell
- Par: 72
- Length: 6,916 yards (6,324 m)
- Course rating: 72.7
- Slope rating: 129

Academy
- Par: 27
- Length: 1,544 yards (1,412 m)
- Course rating: 28.7
- Slope rating: 85

Braemar Golf Course is an 18-hole public golf course in Edina, Minnesota. The facility also has a driving range and a 9-hole par-3 course. The course is owned by the City of Edina, a first-ring suburban community of Minneapolis.

Braemar was listed by Golf Digest as the number one public course in Minnesota in 1984, and has been ranked as one of the best public courses in the United States.

In 1969, Braemar hosted the final edition of the Minnesota Golf Classic on the PGA Tour. In 1979, it hosted the U.S. Women's Amateur Public Links.

== History ==
The original Braemar course opened in 1964. On April 1, 1990, the City of Edina set the name of the roadway connecting Braemar Boulevard to the golf course clubhouse to John Harris Drive.

In 2014, Braemar began work on an extensive redevelopment scheme. Construction of a new Richard Mandell designed championship course began in late 2016; the course opened in May 2019.

== Sister Kenny Rehabilitation Institute ==
Braemar has been a partner with the Sister Kenny Rehabilitation Institute since the 1980s. The partnership has helped develop a golf program that is nationally recognized for meeting the needs of people with disabilities. Sister Kenny golfers have had spinal cord injuries, amputations, strokes, polio, arthritis and other physical disabilities.
