= Richard Mandell =

Richard Mandell (born November 7, 1968) is a noted golf course architect living in Pinehurst northwest of Fayetteville, North Carolina. He was born in Rye near White Plains, New York by some of the most historic golf courses in the country like Bethpage State Park (his all-time favorite is the Black Course there), Westchester Country Club, and Winged Foot. Sneaking onto some of the most renowned courses in the United States, Mandell fell in love with the golden age architects and the impressions they left on the land. Architects including A. W. Tillinghast, Donald Ross, Charles Blair Macdonald, and Seth Raynor inspired him through books, drawings and the courses they designed (which he was fortunate enough to play on occasion).

== Writings ==
Richard Mandell is also a noted golf historian and author. He recently published the book, Pinehurst ~ Home of American Golf (The Evolution of a Legend), a work which recounts the history and development of one of the most celebrated golf areas in the United States. He has contributed chapters to Golf Architecture: A Worldwide Perspective (both volumes 1 and 2) as well as Favourite Holes By Design (where he describes the fourth at Bethpage Black). He has penned numerous articles for magazines like Links Magazine, Golf Illustrated, and Golf Course Architecture. Since 1997, Mandell has taught a class on golf course architecture at North Carolina State University in Raleigh. He writes a golf blog for The Washington Times called Golf Today: Players, Events and Fields, where he discusses everything from PGA Tournament venues to golfing in China.

== Courses ==
- Army Navy Country Club - Arlington, Virginia
- Blue Heron Golf Club - Stevensville, Maryland
- Bobby Jones Golf Course - Florida
- Braemar Golf Course - Edina, Minnesota
- Country Club of North Carolina (Practice Facility) - Pinehurst, North Carolina
- Creekside Golf & Country Club - Atlanta, Georgia
- The Easton Club - Easton, Maryland
- Erie Golf Course - Erie, Pennsylvania
- Highland Country Club (Donald Ross Original) - Fayetteville, North Carolina
- Jamestown Park Golf Club - Jamestown Park, North Carolina
- Monroe Country Club (Donald Ross Original) - Monroe, South Carolina
- Orangeburg Country Club (Ellis Maples Original) - Orangeburg, South Carolina
- Raleigh Country Club (Donald Ross Original) - Raleigh, North Carolina
- Seaford Golf & Country Club (now Hooper's Landing Golf Course) - Seaford, Delaware
- Skydoor Golf Club - Zhangjiajie, Hunan Province, China
- The Reserve Golf Club - Pawleys Island, South Carolina
- The Water's Edge Country Club - Penhook, Virginia

== Awards and recognition ==
- 1996 DuPont North American Safety, Health & Environment Excellence Award given to Seaford Golf & Country Club, Seaford, Maryland.
- Golf Digest - Voted Creekside Golf & Country Club, Atlanta Georgia - "Best New Course Nominee 2000".
- Golf Range Magazine - Voted Blue Heron Golf Course in Stevensville, Maryland - "One of the Top 10 Short Courses in America 2006".
- International Network of Golf - Awarded Pinehurst ~ Home of American Golf (The Evolution of a Legend) Book of the Year 2007. Pinehurst Book
- 2009 Builders Excellence Legacy Award: Renovation of the Year
- 2009 GolfInc. Private Course Renovation of the Year Runner-up
