= Sunset-Camellia Open Invitational =

Golf tournament formerly on the PGA Tour

Tournament information
- Location: Rocklin, California
- Established: 1964
- Course: Sunset Oaks Country Club
- Par: 71
- Tour: PGA Tour
- Format: Stroke play
- Prize fund: US$25,000
- Month played: October
- Final year: 1964

Tournament record score
- Aggregate: 281 Bob McCallister (1964)
- To par: −3 as above

Final champion
- (United States) Bob McCallister
- Location in the United States Location in California

The Sunset-Camellia Open Invitational was a PGA Tour event that was played at Sunset Oaks Country Club in Rocklin, California in October 1964. It was played for only a single year, although at the time it was hoped that it would become a regular stop on the Tour. Big name professional golfers like Arnold Palmer, Gary Player and Jack Nicklaus elected not to play, and despite intensive local media coverage, galleries were small.

The tournament was won by Californian Bob McCallister, his second victory in a PGA event. The failure of the tournament and the demise of Sunset City, a real estate project associated with the country club, led to a series of name changes and changes in ownership.

== Winners ==
Year	Winner	Score	To par	Margin of victory	Runners-up
1964	(United States) Bob McCallister	281	−3	1 stroke	(United States) Pete Brown (Canada) Stan Leonard
