= St. Paul Open Invitational =

Golf tournament

Minnesota Golf Classic
Tournament information
- Location: Edina, Minnesota
- Established: 1930
- Course: Braemar Golf Course
- Par: 71
- Tour: PGA Tour
- Format: Stroke play
- Prize fund: US$100,000
- Month played: July
- Final year: 1969

Tournament record score
- Aggregate: 266 Lloyd Mangrum (1951); 266 Cary Middlecoff (1952); 266 Ken Venturi (1957); 266 Don Fairfield (1960); 266 Jack Rule Jr. (1963)
- To par: −25 Mike Souchak (1958)

Final champion
- (United States) Frank Beard
- Location in the United States Location in Minnesota

The Saint Paul Open Invitational, which played as the Saint Paul Open from 1930 to 1956, and as the Minnesota Golf Classic from 1966 to 1969, was a PGA Tour event played at Keller Golf Course in St. Paul, Minnesota from 1930–1966 and 1968, at Hazeltine National Golf Club in Chaska, Minnesota in 1967, and at Braemar Golf Course in Edina, Minnesota in 1969.

== Winners ==
Year	Winner	Score	To par	Margin of victory	Runner(s)-up
Minnesota Golf Classic
1969	(United States) Frank Beard	269	−15	7 strokes	(United States) Tommy Aaron (South Africa) Hugh Inggs
1968	(United States) Dan Sikes	272	−12	1 stroke	(United States) Ken Still
1967	(United States) Lou Graham	286	−2	1 stroke	(South Africa) Bobby Verwey
1966	(United States) Bobby Nichols	270	−14	1 stroke	(United States) John Schlee
St. Paul Open Invitational
1965	(United States) Raymond Floyd	270	−14	4 strokes	(United States) Tommy Aaron (United States) Gene Littler
1964	(United States) Chuck Courtney	272	−12	3 strokes	(United States) Rod Funseth (United States) Jack McGowan (United States) Charlie Sifford
1963	(United States) Jack Rule Jr.	266	−22	5 strokes	(United States) Fred Hawkins
1962	(United States) Doug Sanders	269	−19	3 strokes	(United States) Dave Hill
1961	(United States) Don January	269	−19	1 stroke	(United States) Buster Cupit
1960	(United States) Don Fairfield	266	−22	2 strokes	(United States) Billy Casper (United States) Lionel Hebert
1959: No tournament
1958	(United States) Mike Souchak (2)	263	−25	4 strokes	(United States) Julius Boros (United States) Sam Snead
1957	(United States) Ken Venturi	266	−22	2 strokes	(United States) Bob Rosburg
St. Paul Open
1956	(United States) Mike Souchak	271	−17	1 stroke	(United States) Sam Snead
1955	(United States) Tommy Bolt	269	−19	2 strokes	(United States) Jerry Barber
1954: No tournament
1953	(United States) Tommy Bolt	269	−19	2 strokes	(United States) Dutch Harrison
1952	(United States) Cary Middlecoff	266	−22	5 strokes	(United States) Sam Snead
1951	(United States) Lloyd Mangrum	266	−22	1 stroke	(United States) Fred Hawkins
1950	(Australia) Jim Ferrier (2)	276	−12	Playoff	(United States) Sam Snead
1949: No tournament
1948	(United States) Jimmy Demaret	273	−15	Playoff	(United States) Otto Greiner
1947	(Australia) Jim Ferrier	276	−12	Playoff	(United States) Fred Haas
1946	(United States) Henry Ransom				
1945	(United States) Dutch Harrison				
1943–44: No tournament
1942	(United States) Chick Harbert				
1941	(United States) Horton Smith				
1940	(United States) Ed Oliver				
1939	(United States) Dick Metz				
1938	(United States) Johnny Revolta				
1937	(United States) Sam Snead				
1936	(England) Harry Cooper (3)				
1935	(England) Harry Cooper (2)				
1934	(United States) Johnny Revolta				
1933	(United States) Jim Foulis				
1932: No tournament
1931	(United States) Horton Smith				
1930	(England) Harry Cooper				
