= Tony Lema =

American professional golfer (1934–1966)

- Lema holding the Claret Jug after his 1964 Open Championship

Personal information
- Full name: Anthony David Lema
- Nickname: Champagne Tony
- Nationality: United States
- Born: February 25, 1934 Oakland, California, U.S.
- Died: July 24, 1966 (aged 32) Lansing, Illinois, U.S.
- Spouse: Elizabeth R. "Betty" Cline

Career
- Sport: Golf
- College: None
- Turned professional: 1955
- Former tour: PGA Tour
- Professional wins: 22

Number of wins by tour
- PGA Tour: 11
- Other: 11

Best results in major championships (wins: 1)
- Masters Tournament: 2nd: 1963
- PGA Championship: T9: 1964
- U.S. Open: T4: 1966
- The Open Championship: Won: 1964

Anthony David Lema (February 25, 1934 – July 24, 1966) was an American professional golfer who rose to fame in the mid-1960s and won a major title, the 1964 Open Championship at the Old Course at St Andrews in Scotland. He died two years later at age 32 in an aircraft accident near Chicago.

== Early life ==
Lema was born in Oakland, California, to Anthony H. Lema (1899–1937) and Clotilda M. Lema, née Silva (1910–2000), both of Portuguese ancestry. His father died of pneumonia when Tony was three years old, and his widowed mother struggled to raise the family of four children on welfare. He began playing golf as a boy at Lake Chabot municipal golf course and learned different aspects of the game from a variety of people. Noted African-American golf coach Lucius Bateman helped develop his swing and Oakland policeman Ralph Hall taught him course strategy. The golf pros at Lake Chabot, Dick Fry and Bill Burch, trained him on basic golf fundamentals, including the use of a square stance.

At age 17, Lema enlisted in the U.S. Marine Corps and served in Korea.

== Professional career ==
Lema was discharged from the military in 1955. He obtained work as an assistant to the club professional at a San Francisco golf club.

Eddie Lowery, a wealthy San Francisco businessman, who invested in talented amateur players in the area, helped to sponsor and encourage Lema. Lowery is best known as the 10-year-old caddy of champion Francis Ouimet at the 1913 U.S. Open. In return for loaning Lema $200 a week in expense money, Lowery received one-third of all Lema's winnings.

In the late 1950s, Lema started playing on the PGA Tour. In 1957, he won the Imperial Valley Open in memorable fashion: assuming he was out of contention, Lema headed to the clubhouse bar, where he drank three highballs. Told that he would face Paul Harney in a sudden-death playoff, a relaxed Lema won the tournament on the second extra hole. The following year, he began developing friendships with a trio of fellow golfers, Johnny Pott, Tommy Jacobs, and Jim Ferree. During 11 tournaments in 1958, Lema finished in the top 15, winning $10,282 for the year.

The following year, Lema's winnings dropped to $5,900, followed by an even worse year in 1960, when he collected a mere $3,060. A raucous off-the-course lifestyle was taking its toll until he began talking with television producer Danny Arnold, who helped him improve his composure and bolster his confidence.

While Lema's struggles continued in 1962, along with his debt to Lowery reaching over $11,000, his luck changed that autumn. His first tour win came in late September at Las Vegas, three strokes ahead runner-up Don January. Four weeks later, on the eve of his playoff victory at the Orange County Open Invitational in Costa Mesa, California, Lema joked he would serve champagne to the press if he won the next day. From then on he was known as Champagne Tony, and his handsome looks and vivacious personality added to his appeal. Golfer Johnny Miller has stated that at the time of his death in 1966, Lema was second only to Arnold Palmer in fan popularity.

"There's nothing like ending a nice day on a good game of golf with a little taste of the bubbly".

— Lema on golf and champagne

That win sparked an impressive performance over the next four years that saw Lema win twelve official tour events, finish second on eleven occasions, and third four times. From 1963 until his death in July 1966, he finished in the top ten over half of the time and made the cut in every major, finishing in the top ten in eight of the fifteen in which he played. Lema was a member of Ryder Cup teams in 1963 and 1965 with a record of 9–1–1 (.864), which remains the best for any player who has played in two or more.

Friend and tour colleague Jack Nicklaus wrote that Lema's play also stabilized and improved greatly after he married Betty Cline, a former airline stewardess, in 1963. One additional reason for Lema's more relaxed play that year was the end of his agreement with Lowery.

In 1963, Lema finished second by one stroke to Nicklaus at the Masters, and missed the playoff for the U.S. Open by two shots, bogeying the last two holes, believing he needed birdies. He won the Memphis Open Invitational later that summer.

Lema won two other tournaments that fall and was named 1963 Most Improved Player by Golf Digest. That winter, he wrote, with Gwylim S. Brown, "Golfers' Gold", an autobiographical account of his eight-year apprenticeship in the competitive cauldron of the PGA Tour.

=== Major champion ===
In 1964, Lema won the Bing Crosby National Pro-Am at Pebble Beach, then three tournaments in four weeks: the Thunderbird Classic at Westchester in Rye, New York, the Buick Open Invitational at Warwick Hills in Grand Blanc, Michigan, and the Cleveland Open at Highland Park (in a playoff with Palmer).

Two weeks later at St Andrews, Scotland, Lema captured his only major title at the Open Championship, five shots ahead of runner-up Nicklaus. Before teeing up in the first round, he had only played nine practice holes. Lema had hired Arnold Palmer's regular British caddy, Tip Anderson, since Palmer was not competing that year. Anderson, a descendant of a past Open champion, Jamie Anderson, had grown up on the course.

At the September matchup of the four major champions of 1964, in the 36-hole exhibition World Series of Golf, Lema won $50,000 (then the largest payoff in golf) at Firestone Country Club in Akron, Ohio, over Palmer (Masters), Ken Venturi (U.S. Open) and Bobby Nichols (PGA Championship).

Due to his good looks and recent success, Lema was tapped for a guest appearance in an episode of the TV series Hazel that aired January 7, 1965, in which Hazel misplaces his prized golf clubs. Later that year, he was on The Lawrence Welk Show, where Welk passed the baton to Lema to direct the Champagne Music Makers.

In 1965, Lema won the Buick Open for the second consecutive year, and the Carling World Open, finishing second in prize money to Nicklaus. In fall 1965, he and Nicklaus formed the U.S. team to the World Cup of Golf. Lema's last victory came in 1966 in late May, in his wife's hometown at the Oklahoma City Open, winning by six strokes at Quail Creek. Two weeks later, he recovered from an opening round 78 to nearly capture a third consecutive Buick Open, finishing three shots behind Phil Rodgers, in fourth place.

== Death ==
Following the PGA Championship at Firestone in Akron in late July 1966, Lema and his wife chartered an airplane to fly them to an exhibition tournament south of Chicago: the Little Buick Open at Lincolnshire Country Club in Crete, Illinois. The twin-engine Beechcraft Bonanza, piloted by Doris Mullen, ran out of fuel and crashed into a water hazard short of the seventh green of the nine-hole golf course at Lansing Sportsman's Club in Lansing (41.5545°N 87.5242°W), about a half mile (0.8 km) northwest of their destination, Lansing Municipal Airport. During the fatal plunge, Mullen swerved left to avoid a group of people standing near the clubhouse. In addition to the Lemas and Mullen, who was a mother of four teenaged children, Dr. George Bard, the copilot and a surgeon, was killed. Bard and Mullen's husband, Wylie, were colleagues as well as owners of the ill-fated plane.

Lema and his wife, Betty, age 30, were buried in California at Holy Sepulchre Cemetery in Hayward after funeral services on July 28 at St. Elizabeth's Church in his hometown of Oakland.

In 1983, a San Leandro public golf course bordering San Francisco Bay was named in his memory as the Tony Lema Golf Course, now part of the Monarch Bay Golf Club complex, just southeast of the Oakland airport. In Ludlow, Massachusetts, the road accessing the local country club is named Tony Lema Drive, and there is a collection of photographs and other items in the clubhouse of Ludlow Country Club featuring Lema.

== Professional wins (22) ==
=== PGA Tour wins (11) ===
Legend
Major championships (1)
Other PGA Tour (11)

No.	Date	Tournament	Winning score	To par	Margin of victory	Runner(s)-up
1	Oct 28, 1962	Orange County Open Invitational	68-66-64-69=267	−17	Playoff	(United States) Bob Rosburg
2	Nov 18, 1962	Mobile Sertoma Open Invitational	67-68-68-70=273	−15	7 strokes	(United States) Doug Sanders
3	May 27, 1963	Memphis Open Invitational	67-67-68-68=270	−10	Playoff	(United States) Tommy Aaron
4	Jan 19, 1964	Bing Crosby National Pro-Am	70-68-70-76=284	−4	3 strokes	(United States) Gay Brewer, (United States) Bo Wininger
5	Jun 7, 1964	Thunderbird Classic	68-67-70-71=276	−12	1 stroke	(United States) Mike Souchak
6	Jun 14, 1964	Buick Open Invitational	69-66-72-70=277	−11	3 strokes	(United States) Dow Finsterwald
7	Jun 28, 1964	Cleveland Open Invitational	65-70-70-65=270	−14	Playoff	(United States) Arnold Palmer
8	Jul 10, 1964	The Open Championship	73-68-68-70=279	−9	5 strokes	(United States) Jack Nicklaus
9	Jun 6, 1965	Buick Open Invitational (2)	71-70-69-70=280	−8	2 strokes	(United States) Johnny Pott
10	Aug 23, 1965	Carling World Open	71-71-67-70=279	−5	2 strokes	(United States) Arnold Palmer
11	May 29, 1966	Oklahoma City Open Invitational	69-68-69-65=271	−17	6 strokes	(United States) Tom Weiskopf

PGA Tour playoff record (3–1)

No.	Year	Tournament	Opponent(s)	Result
1	1962	Orange County Open Invitational	(United States) Bob Rosburg	Won with birdie on third extra hole
2	1963	Memphis Open Invitational	(United States) Tommy Aaron	Won with par on first extra hole
3	1963	Cleveland Open Invitational	(United States) Tommy Aaron, (United States) Arnold Palmer	Palmer won 18-hole playoff; Palmer: −4 (67), Aaron: −1 (70), Lema: −1 (70)
4	1964	Cleveland Open Invitational	(United States) Arnold Palmer	Won with birdie on first extra hole

=== Other wins (11) ===
Note: This list is probably incomplete.

- 1957 Imperial Valley Open
- 1958 Idaho Open
- 1961 Hesperia Invitational Open, Mexican Open
- 1962 Mexican Open, Northern California Open, Northern California PGA Championship, Sahara Invitational
- 1963 Northern California PGA Championship
- 1964 World Series of Golf, Northern California PGA Championship

== Major championships ==
=== Wins (1) ===
Year	Championship	54 holes	Winning score	Margin	Runner-up
1964	The Open Championship	7 shot lead	−9 (73-68-68-70=279)	5 strokes	(United States) Jack Nicklaus

=== Results timeline ===
Tournament	1956	1957	1958	1959	1960	1961	1962	1963	1964	1965	1966
Masters Tournament								2	T9	T21	T22
U.S. Open	50						CUT	T5	20	T8	T4
The Open Championship									1	T5	T30
PGA Championship							WD	T13	T9	T61	T34

Win
Top 10
Did not play

CUT = missed the half-way cut
WD = withdrew
"T" = tied

=== Summary ===
Tournament	Wins	2nd	3rd	Top-5	Top-10	Top-25	Events	Cuts made
Masters Tournament	0	1	0	1	2	4	4	4
U.S. Open	0	0	0	2	3	4	6	5
The Open Championship	1	0	0	2	2	2	3	3
PGA Championship	0	0	0	0	1	2	5	4
Totals	1	1	0	5	8	12	18	16

- Most consecutive cuts made – 15 (1963 Masters – 1966 PGA)
- Longest streak of top-10s – 2 (three times)

== U.S. national team appearances ==
Professional

- Ryder Cup: 1963 (winners), 1965 (winners)
- Canada Cup: 1965
