= Sahara Invitational =

Golf tournament formerly on the PGA Tour

Tournament information
- Location: Las Vegas, Nevada
- Established: 1958
- Course: Sahara Nevada Country Club
- Par: 71
- Length: 6,800 yards (6,200 m)
- Tour: PGA Tour
- Format: Stroke play
- Prize fund: US$135,000
- Month played: September/October
- Final year: 1976

Tournament record score
- Aggregate: 269 Billy Casper (1965)
- To par: −15 as above

Final champion
- (United States) George Archer
- Location in the United States Location in Nevada

The Sahara Invitational was a PGA Tour event in Nevada from 1958 through 1976, played in Las Vegas and sponsored by the Sahara Hotel. In the first four years, it was the Sahara Pro-Am and an unofficial tour event. Paradise Valley Country Club hosted in 1970 and 1971, and Sahara Nevada Country Club from 1972–1976.

Jack Nicklaus won Sahara four times in a seven-year span in the 1960s, and three future major champions (Tony Lema, Lanny Wadkins, and John Mahaffey) made Sahara their first tour victory.

A month after the 1976 event, it was announced in early November that the Sahara Invitational was being discontinued. Edward M. Nigro, vice president and general manager of Hotel Sahara, cited rising costs, scheduling conflicts, and a decline in the national promotion benefit as the reasons for the tournament's cancellation.

The Las Vegas Founders returned the PGA Tour to Las Vegas in 1983 with the Panasonic Las Vegas Pro Celebrity Classic; since 2007, it has been organized by the Shriners Hospitals for Children.

== Tournament highlights ==
- 1962: Tony Lema wins the inaugural Sahara Invitational, three shots ahead of Don January.
- 1964: R. H. Sikes shoots a first round 62 on his way to a two shot triumph over defending champion Jack Nicklaus, Phil Rodgers, and Jack McGowan.
- 1967: Jack Nicklaus becomes the only Sahara champion to successfully defend his title. He wins by one shot over Steve Spray.
- 1968: Chi-Chi Rodríguez shoots a final round 64 to come from six shots back and force a sudden death playoff. He then birdies the first playoff hole to defeat Dale Douglass.
- 1969: Nicklaus shoots a final round 65 for his 29th PGA Tour title and fourth Sahara victory. He finishes four shots ahead of Frank Beard.
- 1971: Lee Trevino wins his sixth PGA Tour event of the year, one shot ahead of George Archer.
- 1974: Al Geiberger wins for the first time on tour since his PGA Championship triumph in 1966; he finishes three shots ahead of Jerry Heard, Wally Armstrong, Mike Hill, and Dave Hill.
- 1976: Runner-up five years earlier, Archer wins the last Sahara, two strokes ahead of defending champion Dave Hill and third round leader Don January.

== Winners ==
Year	Tour (Note: PGAT − PGA Tour.)	Winner	Score	To par	Margin of victory	Runner(s)-up	Winner's share ($)
Sahara Invitational
1976	PGAT	(United States) George Archer	271	−13	2 strokes	(United States) Dave Hill (United States) Don January	27,000
1975	PGAT	(United States) Dave Hill	270	−14	Playoff	(United States) Rik Massengale	27,000
1974	PGAT	(United States) Al Geiberger	273	−11	3 strokes	(United States) Wally Armstrong (United States) Jerry Heard (United States) Dave Hill (United States) Mike Hill	27,000
1973	PGAT	(United States) John Mahaffey	271	−13	3 strokes	(United States) Dave Eichelberger	27,000
1972	PGAT	(United States) Lanny Wadkins	273	−11	1 stroke	(United States) Arnold Palmer	27,000
1971	PGAT	(United States) Lee Trevino	280	−8	1 stroke	(United States) George Archer	27,000
1970	PGAT	(United States) Babe Hiskey	276	−12	1 stroke	(United States) Miller Barber (United States) Terry Dill (United States) Bob Goalby	20,000
1969	PGAT	(United States) Jack Nicklaus (4)	272	−12	4 strokes	(United States) Frank Beard	20,000
1968	PGAT	(United States) Chi-Chi Rodríguez	274	−10	Playoff	(United States) Dale Douglass	20,000
1967	PGAT	(United States) Jack Nicklaus (3)	270	−14	1 stroke	(United States) Steve Spray	20,000
1966	PGAT	(United States) Jack Nicklaus (2)	282	−2	3 strokes	(United States) Miller Barber (United States) Arnold Palmer	20,000
1965	PGAT	(United States) Billy Casper	269	−15	3 strokes	(United States) Billy Martindale	20,000
1964	PGAT	(United States) R. H. Sikes	275	−9	3 strokes	(United States) Jack McGowan (United States) Jack Nicklaus (United States) Phil Rodgers	12,000
1963	PGAT	(United States) Jack Nicklaus	276	−8	1 stroke	(United States) Gay Brewer (United States) Al Geiberger	13,000
1962		(United States) Tony Lema	270	−14	3 strokes	(United States) Don January	2,800
Sahara Pro-Am
1961		(United States) Phil Rodgers					
1960		(United States) Bob Duden					
1959		(United States) Doug Sanders					
1958		(United States) Bill Johnston					
