= 1964 Open Championship =

Coordinates: 56.343°N 2.803°W

Tournament information
- Dates: 8–10 July 1964
- Location: St Andrews, Scotland
- Course: Old Course at St Andrews

Statistics
- Par: 72
- Length: 6,926 yards (6,333 m)
- Field: 120 players, 45 after cut
- Cut: 153 (+9)
- Prize fund: £8,500 $23,800
- Winner's share: £1,500 $4,200

Champion
- (United States) Tony Lema
- 279 (−9)

Location in Scotland
Location in Fife, Scotland

The 1964 Open Championship was the 93rd Open Championship, played 8–10 July at the Old Course in St Andrews, Scotland. Tony Lema won his only major championship, five strokes ahead of runner-up Jack Nicklaus. He led by seven strokes after 54 holes and shot a final round 70. Neither had played the Old Course before and Lema had never played in Britain; he gave much of the credit for his victory to his caddy, Tip Anderson. It was Lema's fourth victory in six weeks; he won three events on the PGA Tour in June. Nicklaus equaled the course record with a 66 in the third round.

The PGA Championship was played the next week in Columbus, Ohio, one of five times in the 1960s that these two majors were played in consecutive weeks in July.

Lema played in two more Opens; two weeks after competing in 1966 at Muirfield, he and his pregnant wife were killed in a plane crash near Chicago.

== Course ==
Hole	Name	Yards	Par	Hole	Name	Yards	Par
1	Burn	374	4	10	Tenth ^	338	4
2	Dyke	411	4	11	High (In)	170	3
3	Cartgate (Out)	370	4	12	Heathery (In)	312	4
4	Ginger Beer	470	4	13	Hole O'Cross (In)	427	4
5	Hole O'Cross (Out)	567	5	14	Long	560	5
6	Heathery (Out)	414	4	15	Cartgate (In)	413	4
7	High (Out)	364	4	16	Corner of the Dyke	380	4
8	Short	163	3	17	Road	453	4
9	End	359	4	18	Tom Morris	381	4
Out		3,492	36	In		3,434	36
Source:				Total		6,926	72

^ The 10th hole was posthumously named for Bobby Jones in 1972

Previous lengths of the course for The Open Championship (since 1950):

- 6,936 yards (6,342 m) - 1960, 1955

== Field ==
The exemption categories were:

1. The first 20 and those tying for 20th place in the 1963 Open
Brian Allen, Peter Alliss, Bob Charles (3), Neil Coles, Max Faulkner, Jean Garaïalde, Harold Henning, Brian Huggett, Bernard Hunt, Alex King, Malcolm Leeder, Hugh Lewis, Ian MacDonald, John MacDonald, Sebastian Miguel, Kel Nagle (3), Jack Nicklaus (5), Christy O'Connor Snr, Frank Phillips, Gary Player (3), Phil Rodgers, Sewsunker Sewgolum, Ramón Sota, Peter Thomson (3), Brian Wilkes

2. The first 30 and those tying for 30th place in the P.G.A. Order of Merit for 1963

3. The last 10 Open champions (1954–63)
Bobby Locke

- Entered but later withdrew: Arnold Palmer (5)

4. The last 5 Amateur champions (1959–63)
Deane Beman (6) (a), Michael Bonallack (a), Joe Carr (a)

- Eligible but did not enter: Richard Davies, Michael Lunt

5. The last 10 U.S. Open champions (1954–63)

- Eligible but did not enter: Tommy Bolt, Julius Boros, Billy Casper, Jack Fleck, Ed Furgol, Gene Littler, Dick Mayer, Cary Middlecoff

6. The last 5 U.S. Amateur champions (1959–63)

- Eligible but did not enter: Labron Harris Jr.

Jack Nicklaus had turned professional but was exempt under other categories

7. The first 30 money winners and those tying for 30th place in the U.S.P.G.A. official list for one year ending with the P.G.A. tournament immediately before the closing date of the U.S. Open entries

Exemptions for amateur champions were only granted if the player was still an amateur.

Qualification took place on 3–4 July (Friday and Saturday) at the New and Eden courses. They were run as two separate events with 35 players to qualify from the New Course and 34 from the Eden course, together with 51 exemptions to make a total field of 120. The number of alternates was reduced from three to two.

== Round summaries ==
=== First round ===
Wednesday, 8 July 1964

Place	Player	Score	To par
T1	(France) Jean Garaïalde	71	−1
T1	(Republic of Ireland) Christy O'Connor Snr	71	−1
T3	(Australia) Bruce Devlin	72	E
T3	(England) Harry Weetman	72	E
T5	(Republic of Ireland) Hugh Boyle	73	+1
T5	(England) Max Faulkner	73	+1
T5	(England) Bernard Hunt	73	+1
T5	(United States) Tony Lema	73	+1
T5	(Spain) Ángel Miguel	73	+1
T10	(South Africa) Stuart Davies	74	+2
T10	(Republic of Ireland) Christy Greene	74	+2
T10	(Republic of Ireland) Jimmy Martin	74	+2
T10	(United States) Phil Rodgers	74	+2
T10	(Scotland) George Will	74	+2

=== Second round ===
Thursday, 9 July 1964

Place	Player	Score	To par
1	(United States) Tony Lema	73-68=141	−3
2	(England) Harry Weetman	72-71=143	−1
T3	(Australia) Bruce Devlin	72-72=144	E
T3	(Republic of Ireland) Christy O'Connor Snr	71-73=144	E
5	(France) Jean Garaïalde	71-74=145	+1
T6	(England) Max Faulkner	73-73=146	+2
T6	(Republic of Ireland) Jimmy Martin	74-72=146	+2
T8	(England) Tony Coop	75-72=147	+3
T8	(England) Bernard Hunt	73-74=147	+3
T8	(Taiwan) Lu Liang-Huan	76-71=147	+3

Amateurs: Beman (+13), Bonallack (+13), Carr (+13), Clark (+16), Rutherford (+17), Saddler (+17), Shade (+21).

=== Third round ===
Friday, 10 July 1964 (morning)

Place	Player	Score	To par
1	(United States) Tony Lema	73-68-68=209	−7
2	(United States) Jack Nicklaus	76-74-66=216	E
T3	(Australia) Bruce Devlin	72-72-73=217	+1
T3	(England) Bernard Hunt	73-74-70=217	+1
T5	(Argentina) Roberto De Vicenzo	76-72-70=218	+2
T5	(Republic of Ireland) Christy O'Connor Snr	71-73-74=218	+2
T5	(England) Harry Weetman	72-71-75=218	+2
8	(New Zealand) Bob Charles	79-71-69=219	+3
9	(Spain) Ángel Miguel	73-76-72=221	+5
T10	(England) Alex Caygill	77-74-71=222	+6
T10	(South Africa) Stuart Davies	74-77-71=222	+6
T10	(England) Malcolm Gregson	78-70-74=222	+6
T10	(South Africa) Harold Henning	78-73-71=222	+6
T10	(England) Ralph Moffitt	76-72-74=222	+6
T10	(South Africa) Gary Player	78-71-73=222	+6
T10	(England) Syd Scott	75-74-73=222	+6

=== Final round ===
Friday, 10 July 1964 (afternoon)

Place	Player	Score	To par	Money (£)
1	(United States) Tony Lema	73-68-68-70=279	−9	1,500
2	(United States) Jack Nicklaus	76-74-66-68=284	−4	1,000
3	(Argentina) Roberto De Vicenzo	76-72-70-67=285	−3	800
4	(England) Bernard Hunt	73-74-70-70=287	−1	650
5	(Australia) Bruce Devlin	72-72-73-73=290	+2	500
T6	(Republic of Ireland) Christy O'Connor Snr	71-73-74-73=291	+3	313
T6	(England) Harry Weetman	72-71-75-73=291	+3	313
T8	(South Africa) Harold Henning	78-73-71-70=292	+4	183
T8	(Spain) Ángel Miguel	73-76-72-71=292	+4	183
T8	(South Africa) Gary Player	78-71-73-70=292	+4	183
