= Ligonier Armory =

- U.S. National Register of Historic Places
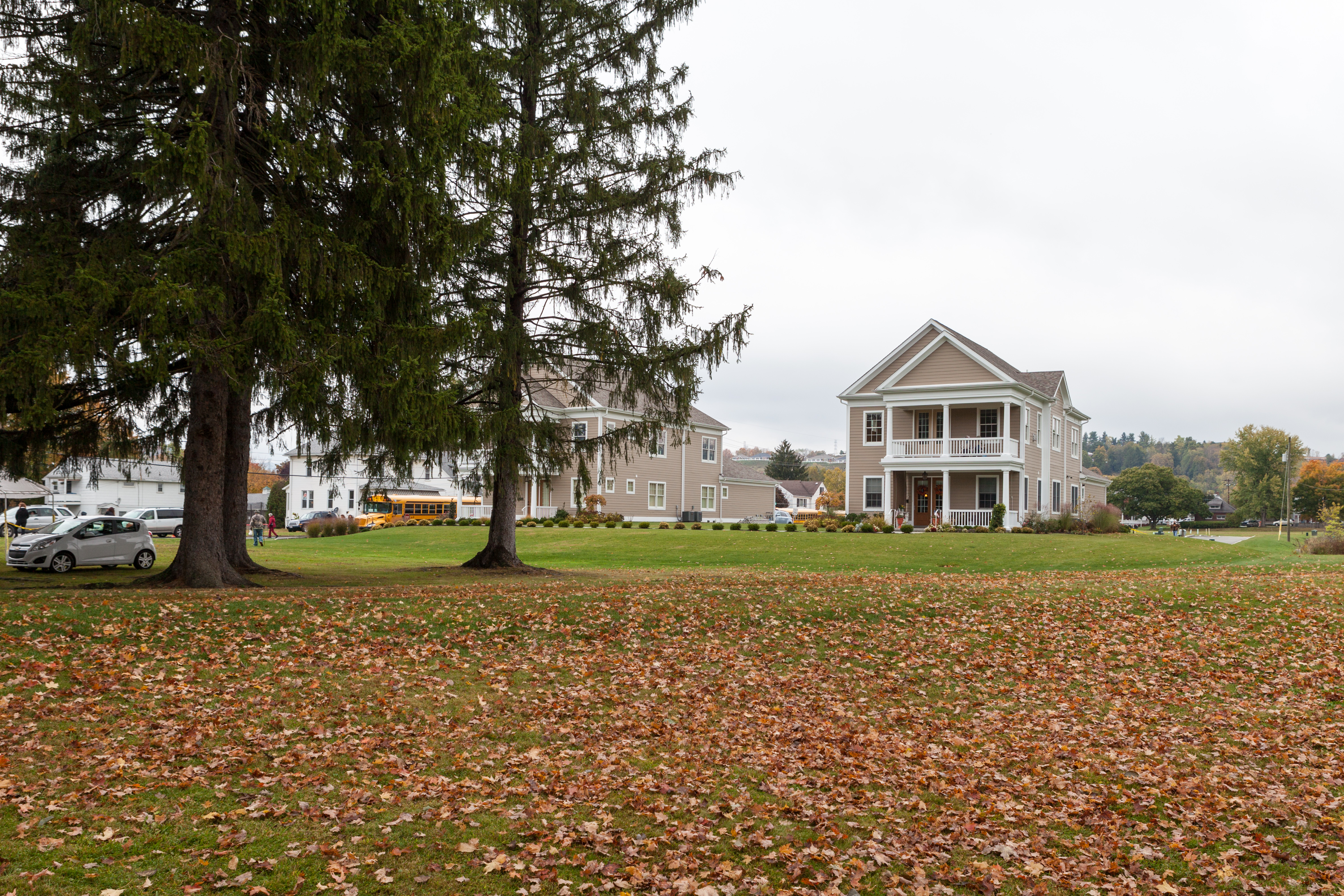
- Former location, seen from West Main Street, looking north

- Location within Pennsylvania Location within the United States
- Location: 358 W. Main St., Ligonier, Pennsylvania
- Coordinates: 40°14′49″N 79°14′33″W
- Area: 2.6 acres (1.1 ha)
- Built: 1938
- Architect: Brocker, Robert T.; Kuhn, Newcomer, and Valentour
- Architectural style: Art Deco
- MPS: Pennsylvania National Guard Armories MPS
- NRHP reference No.: 91000514
- Added to NRHP: May 9, 1991

Ligonier Armory was an historic National Guard armory that was located in Ligonier, Westmoreland County, Pennsylvania.

It was added to the National Register of Historic Places in 1991, but was demolished during the late 2000s to facilitate residential redevelopment of the site.

== History and architectural features ==
Built between 1937 and 1938 as a Public Works Administration sponsored project, this historic structure was a T-shaped brick building that was designed in the Art Deco style. The two-story front section housed a drill hall, with a one-story administrative section in the rear. Additions were completed in 1962 and 1972.
