= Mason Rudolph (golfer) =

American professional golfer (1934–2011)

Personal information
- Full name: Edgar Mason Rudolph
- Nationality: United States
- Born: May 23, 1934 Clarksville, Tennessee, U.S.
- Died: April 18, 2011 (aged 76) Tuscaloosa, Alabama, U.S.
- Height: 5 ft 11 in (1.80 m)
- Weight: 180 lb (82 kg; 13 st)

Career
- Sport: Golf
- Turned professional: 1958
- Former tours: PGA Tour; Champions Tour
- Professional wins: 13

Number of wins by tour
- PGA Tour: 5
- Other: 8

Best results in major championships
- Masters Tournament: 4th: 1965
- PGA Championship: T3: 1973
- U.S. Open: T8: 1966
- The Open Championship: DNP

Edgar Mason Rudolph (May 23, 1934 – April 18, 2011) was an American professional golfer who won five times on the PGA Tour.

== Early life and amateur career ==
In 1934, Rudolph was born in Clarksville, Tennessee. He won the U.S. Junior Amateur in 1950. In 1956, he won the Western Amateur and the Tennessee Open (as an amateur). He played on the 1957 Walker Cup team.

== Professional career ==
In 1958, Rudolph turned professional. The following year he joined the PGA Tour and was Rookie of the Year. He won five official PGA Tour events during his career. Rudolph also won the Tennessee Open five times as a pro. He played on the 1971 Ryder Cup team.

In December 1959, Rudolph took part in a match against Sam Snead on NBC's World Championship Golf. After Snead found a 15th club in his bag on the 12th hole of the match, Snead decided to stage the conclusion of the televised match to show the official result, a Rudolph win, during its final holes after the 11 hole penalty on Snead led to an 11 and 7 win for Rudolph. After the match was over, Snead said he staged the result once the match officially concluded at the point of infraction by missing putts in order to not spoil the show. The controversy erupted as the broadcast aired in April 1960, months after hearings into the quiz show rigging scandals, and the sponsor cancelled its participation once Snead admitted he staged the match to show the legal result after he officially lost the match at the 12th hole with the discovery of the violation. Legally, Snead did not fix the match, since the outcome was officially decided on the 12th hole as a Rudolph win. Modern broadcasts would disclose that portions of the match not affecting the outcome of the game were edited or recreated. The rule was changed in 1964 to a cap of two holes, meaning Rudolph would be leading by two holes once the penalty was given, and the match continued.

== Awards and honors ==
- In 1959, Rudolph earned the PGA Tour's Rookie of the Year award
- In 1990, Rudolph was inducted as a charter member of the Tennessee Golf Hall of Fame in 1990.
- A 9-hole, regulation-length golf course in his hometown is named for him. A men's and a women's collegiate golf tournament also bears his name.

== Professional wins (13) ==
=== PGA Tour wins (5) ===
No.	Date	Tournament	Winning score	Margin of victory	Runner(s)-up
1	Sep 27, 1959	Golden Gate Championship	−9 (67-72-67-69=275)	2 strokes	(United States) Dow Finsterwald, (United States) Bob Goalby
2	Oct 27, 1963	Fig Garden Village Open Invitational	−13 (66-67-71-71=275)	3 strokes	(United States) Tommy Aaron, (United States) Al Geiberger
3	Mar 2, 1964	Greater New Orleans Open Invitational	−5 (68-70-70-75=283)	1 stroke	(United States) Jack Nicklaus, (United States) Chi-Chi Rodríguez, (United States) Glenn Stuart
4	Aug 14, 1966	Thunderbird Classic	−10 (69-70-70-69=278)	1 stroke	(United States) Jack Nicklaus
5	Sep 27, 1970	Green Island Open Invitational	−6 (75-68-67-64=274)	2 strokes	(United States) Chris Blocker

PGA Tour playoff record (0–1)

No.	Year	Tournament	Opponent	Result
1	1963	Portland Open Invitational	(Canada) George Knudson	Lost to eagle on first extra hole

=== Other wins (8) ===
- 1956 Tennessee Open (as an amateur)
- 1959 Tennessee Open
- 1962 Haig & Haig Scotch Foursome (with Kathy Whitworth)
- 1963 Tennessee Open
- 1964 Tennessee Open
- 1966 Tennessee Open
- 1969 Tennessee PGA Championship
- 1972 Tennessee Open

== Results in major championships ==
Tournament	1950	1951	1952	1953	1954	1955	1956	1957	1958	1959
Masters Tournament									CUT	
U.S. Open	CUT	CUT								
PGA Championship										

Tournament	1960	1961	1962	1963	1964	1965	1966	1967	1968	1969
Masters Tournament	CUT	T28		T15	T18	4	CUT	T10	T14	11
U.S. Open	CUT	T45	T28	T27	T34	T11	T8	T38	CUT	CUT
PGA Championship	T22	T37		T23	4	T20	T22	T28	T17	CUT

Tournament	1970	1971	1972	1973	1974
Masters Tournament	CUT		CUT	T14	CUT
U.S. Open	T27	T42	T40	CUT	CUT
PGA Championship	T10	T57	T36	T3	T51

Note: Rudolph never played in The Open Championship.

Top 10
Did not play

CUT = missed the half-way cut
"T" indicates a tie for a place

=== Summary ===
Tournament	Wins	2nd	3rd	Top-5	Top-10	Top-25	Events	Cuts made
Masters Tournament	0	0	0	1	2	7	14	8
U.S. Open	0	0	0	0	1	2	17	10
The Open Championship	0	0	0	0	0	0	0	0
PGA Championship	0	0	1	2	3	8	14	13
Totals	0	0	1	3	6	17	45	31

- Most consecutive cuts made – 14 (1960 PGA – 1965 PGA)
- Longest streak of top-10s – 2 (1964 PGA – 1965 Masters)

== U.S. national team appearances ==
Amateur

- Walker Cup: 1957 (winners)

Professional

- Ryder Cup: 1971 (winners)
