= R. H. Sikes =

American professional golfer (1940–2023)

Personal information
- Full name: Richard Horace Sikes
- Nickname: R.H. or Dick
- Nationality: United States
- Born: March 6, 1940 Paris, Arkansas, U.S.
- Died: November 2, 2023 (aged 83)
- Height: 6 ft 1 in (1.85 m)
- Weight: 160 lb (73 kg; 11 st)
- Children: 1

Career
- Sport: Golf
- College: University of Arkansas
- Turned professional: 1964
- Former tours: PGA Tour; Champions Tour
- Professional wins: 4

Number of wins by tour
- PGA Tour: 2
- Other: 2

Best results in major championships
- Masters Tournament: T39: 1966
- PGA Championship: T13: 1965
- U.S. Open: T46: 1967
- The Open Championship: 12th: 1966

Richard Horace Sikes (March 6, 1940 – November 2, 2023) was an American professional golfer who played on the PGA Tour in the 1960s and 1970s.

== Early life and amateur career ==
Sikes was born in Paris, Arkansas. He had a stellar amateur and college career as a member of the golf team at the University of Arkansas. He won the U.S. Amateur Public Links in 1961 and 1962. In 1963, he won the NCAA Championship, was runner-up at the U.S. Amateur, and played on the victorious Walker Cup team. Sikes' victory at the NCAA Championship was the only Razorbacks national championship recognized by the NCAA until John McDonnell's track and field teams of the mid-1980s to mid-1990s started winning them, and Nolan Richardson's basketball program won the 1994 men's basketball crown.

== Professional career ==
In 1964, Sikes turned pro. He was victorious at the 1964 Sahara Invitational during his rookie season on the PGA Tour, and earned Golf Digest's Rookie of the Year Award.

Sikes played briefly on the Senior PGA Tour from 1990 to 1992. His best finish was a T-36 at the 1992 Raley's Senior Gold Rush.

== Death ==
Sikes died November 2, 2023. He was 83. His obituary stated he was a resident of Springdale, but did not specify he died there.

== Awards and honors ==
- In 1964, Sikes earned Golf Digest's Rookie of the Year Award
- In 2002, Sikes was inducted into the Arkansas Golf Hall of Fame

== Amateur wins ==
- 1961 U.S. Amateur Public Links
- 1962 U.S. Amateur Public Links
- 1963 NCAA Championship (individual)

== Professional wins (4) ==
=== PGA Tour wins (2) ===
No.	Date	Tournament	Winning score	Margin of victory	Runner(s)-up
1	Oct 18, 1964	Sahara Invitational	−9 (62-71-70-72=275)	2 strokes	(United States) Jack McGowan, (United States) Jack Nicklaus, (United States) Phil Rodgers
2	Aug 7, 1966	Cleveland Open Invitational	−16 (69-68-63-68=268)	3 strokes	(United States) Bob Goalby

PGA Tour playoff record (0–1)

No.	Year	Tournament	Opponents	Result
1	1969	IVB-Philadelphia Golf Classic	(United States) Gay Brewer, (United States) Dave Hill, (United States) Tommy Jacobs	Hill won with birdie on first extra hole

=== Other wins (2) ===
- 1962 Arizona Open (as an amateur)
- 1981 Southern California PGA Championship

== U.S. national team appearances ==
Amateur

- Walker Cup: 1963 (winners)
- Eisenhower Trophy: 1962 (winners)
- Americas Cup: 1963 (winners)
