= Ligonier, Pennsylvania =

Borough in Pennsylvania, US

- Borough
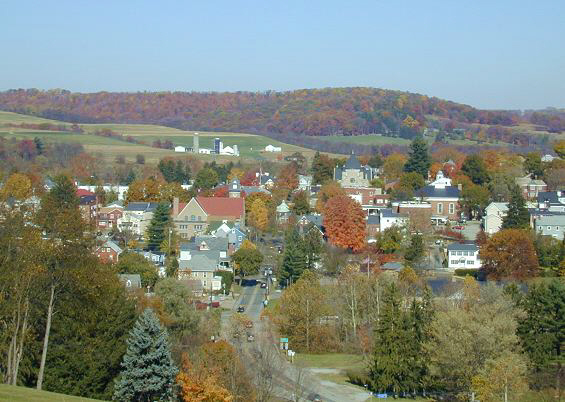
- View of Ligonier

- Flag Logo
- Interactive map of Ligonier, Pennsylvania
- Location within Pennsylvania Location within the United States
- Coordinates: 40°14′40″N 79°14′13″W
- Country: United States
- State: Pennsylvania
- County: Westmoreland
- Fort established: 1758
- Settled: 1817
- Incorporated: April 10, 1834
- Founder: Colonel John Ramsey
- Named for: John Ligonier, 1st Earl Ligonier

Government
  - Mayor: Earle Franklin

Area
  - Total: 0.51 sq mi (1.31 km^{2})
  - Land: 0.51 sq mi (1.31 km^{2})
  - Water: 0 sq mi (0.00 km^{2})
- Elevation: 1,197 ft (365 m)

Population (2020)
  - Total: 1,513
  - Density: 3,001.8/sq mi (1,159.02/km^{2})
- Time zone: UTC-5 (EST)
  - Summer (DST): UTC-4 (EDT)
- ZIP code: 15658
- Area codes: 724, 878
- FIPS code: 42-43232
- School District: Ligonier Valley School District
- Website: ligonierborough.com

Ligonier is a borough in Westmoreland County, Pennsylvania, United States. The population was 1,513 at the 2020 census. It is part of the Pittsburgh metropolitan area.

Ligonier was settled in the 1760s. Ligonier is the site of a reconstruction of Fort Ligonier, a frontier fort of the French and Indian War.

== History ==
In 1758, when British forces launched a major campaign to remove French forces from the forks of the Ohio, now Pittsburgh, this spot on Loyalhanna Creek was the site of their westernmost camp before reaching the Ohio. The British maintained a large army, a virtual moving city of 6,000 people, that temporarily made Ligonier the second-most populated spot in Pennsylvania, second only to Philadelphia. Fort Ligonier was named after John Ligonier, a British noble of French origin who held the rank of Field Marshal in the British Army. Eventually, the name of the settlement that grew up around the fort was shortened to Ligonier.

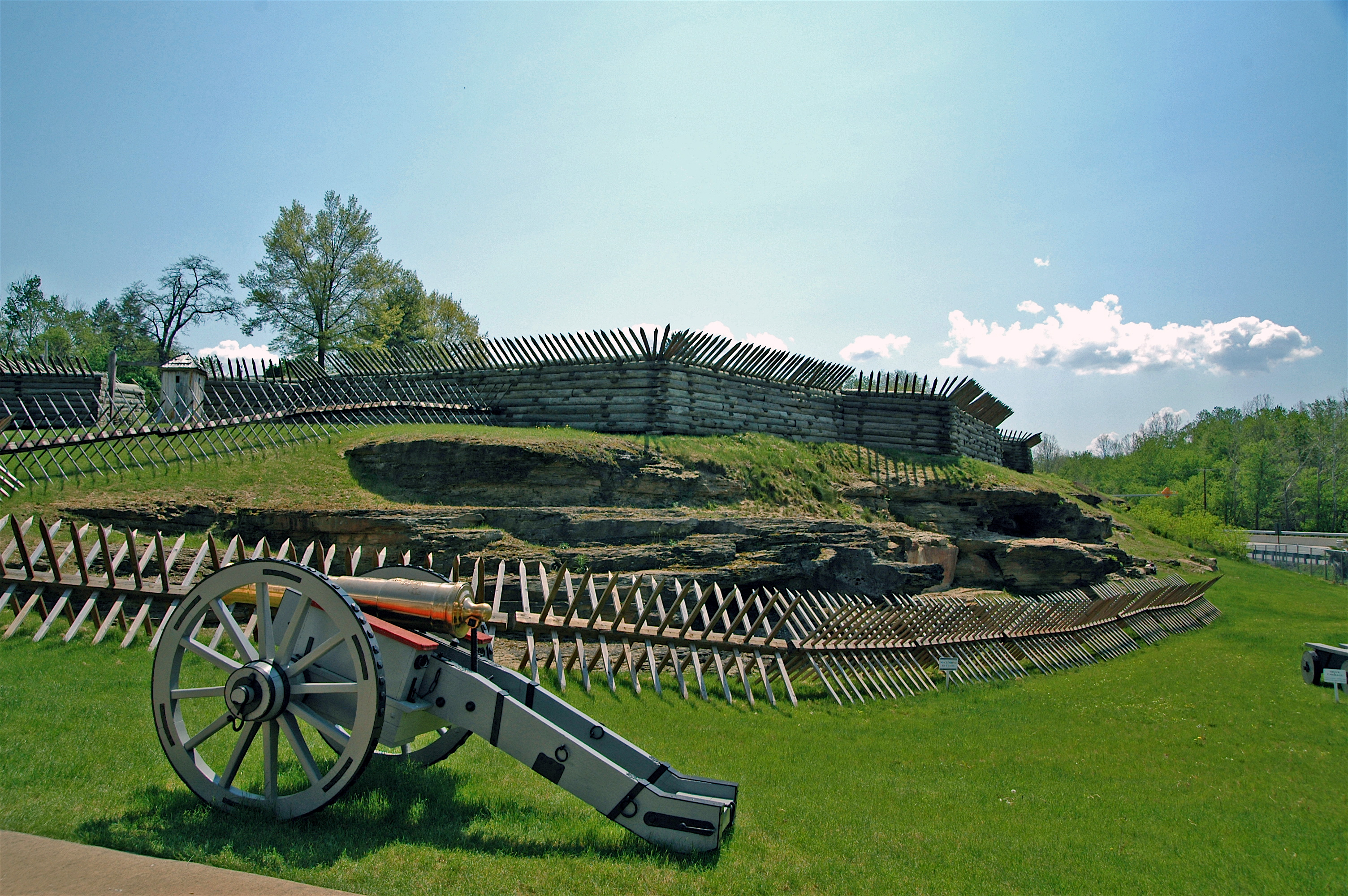
Image of Fort Ligonier

In 1817, the Philadelphia-Pittsburgh Turnpike was completed, a gravel road that was the precursor to today's US Route 30. Fort Ligonier was a logical place for travelers to break their journey, and with such commercial opportunities in mind, a local resident named John Ramsay (sometimes spelled Ramsey) laid out the street plan, including the space now known as the Diamond. He initially called the town Ramseytown, later changed to Wellington (after the Duke of Wellington), and finally the name was changed to Ligonier. Several decades of prosperity followed. On April 10, 1834, Ligonier was incorporated as a borough.

However, in 1852 the Pennsylvania Railroad was completed, which bypassed Ligonier and passed through the towns of Bolivar and Latrobe instead. Traffic shifted from horse-drawn vehicles to the railroad, causing the community's population to drop to 350 according to the 1860 census.

Ligonier benefited when the Ligonier Valley Railroad was completed in 1877, linking the community to Latrobe where connections to the Pennsylvania Railroad were possible. The Ligonier Valley Railroad enabled lumber, coal, and quarried stone to be transported out of the Ligonier Valley, which spurred development of the town. Additionally, the railroad made it easier for Pittsburgh residents to visit Ligonier, causing the town to develop as a summer resort. Some major physical changes to Ligonier occurred during this period. In 1894, the Diamond, which had been used as a corral for horses and wagons, was transformed into a park with a bandstand. A large hotel, the Hotel Breniser, was built in 1900 where the town hall currently sits. In 1909–1910, the Ligonier Valley Railroad built an ornate station and headquarters building, which still stands at 339 West Main Street.

In 1952, the Ligonier Valley Railroad ceased operation, due to a combination of overlogging, decline of the coal industry, and the loss of passenger traffic to motor vehicles. The Pittsburgh, Westmoreland and Somerset Railroad also served Ligonier from 1899 to 1916, although it did not enjoy the success of the Ligonier Valley Railroad.

Ligonier has three listings on the National Register of Historic Places: the Fort Ligonier site at 216 South Market Street; the Ligonier Historic District, which encompasses the Diamond and the oldest parts of the borough; and the demolished Ligonier Armory.

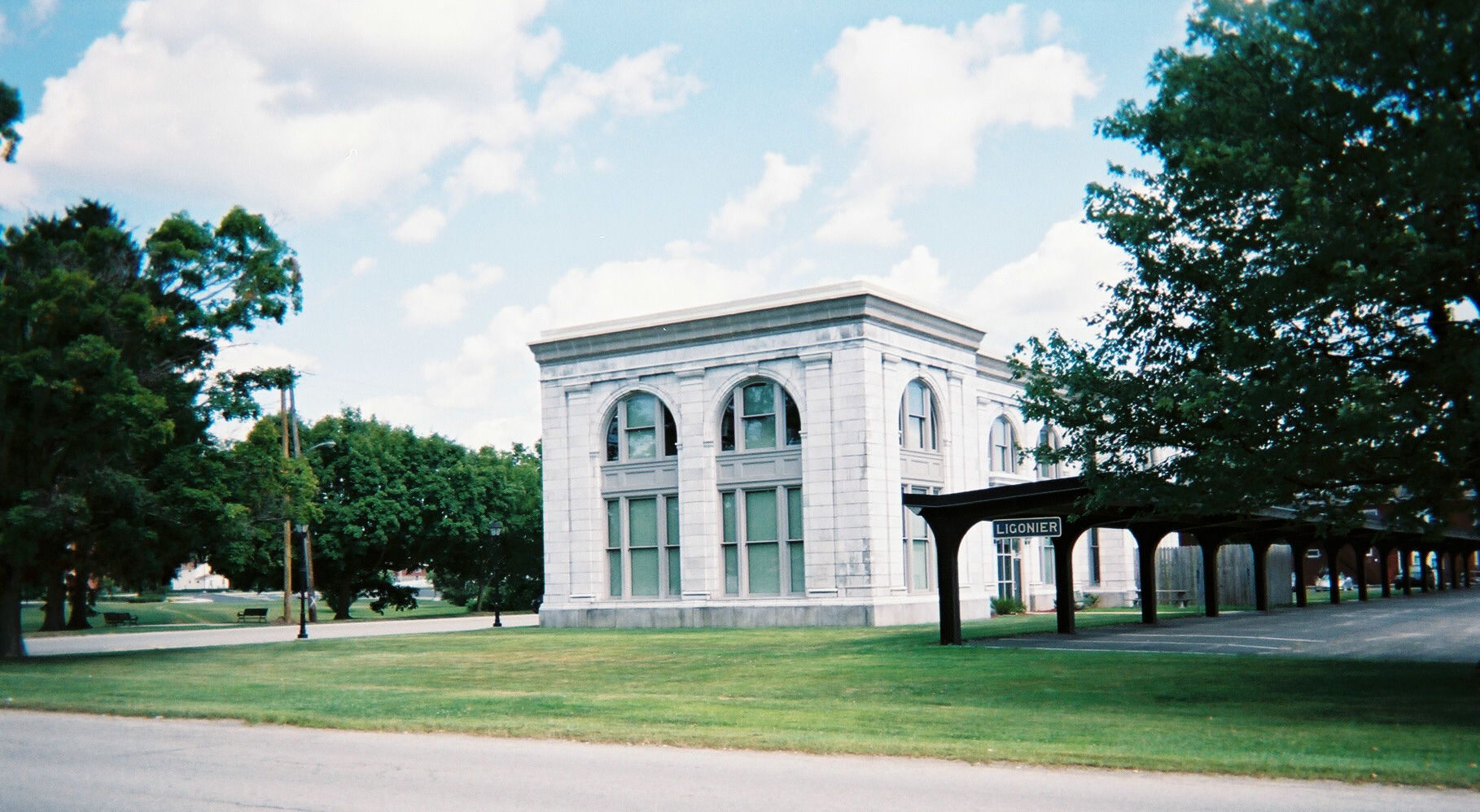
Former train station, now school district offices

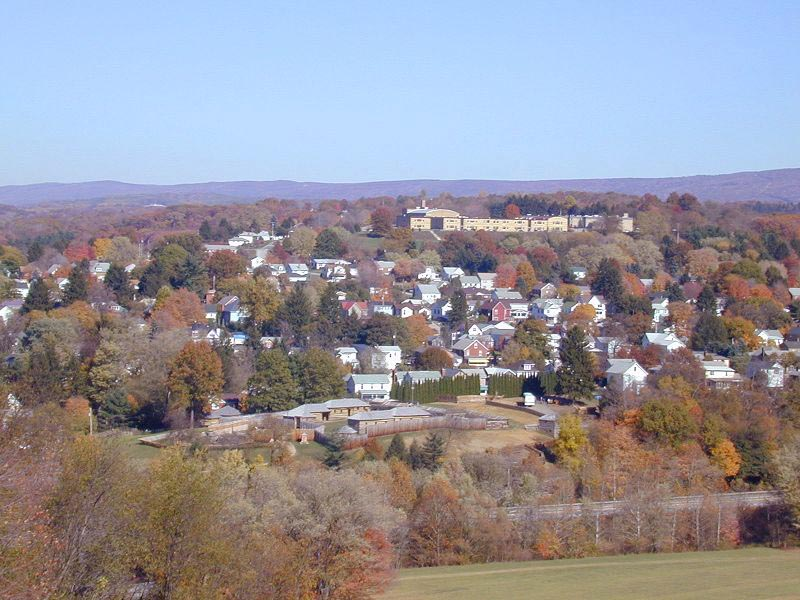
Fort Ligonier

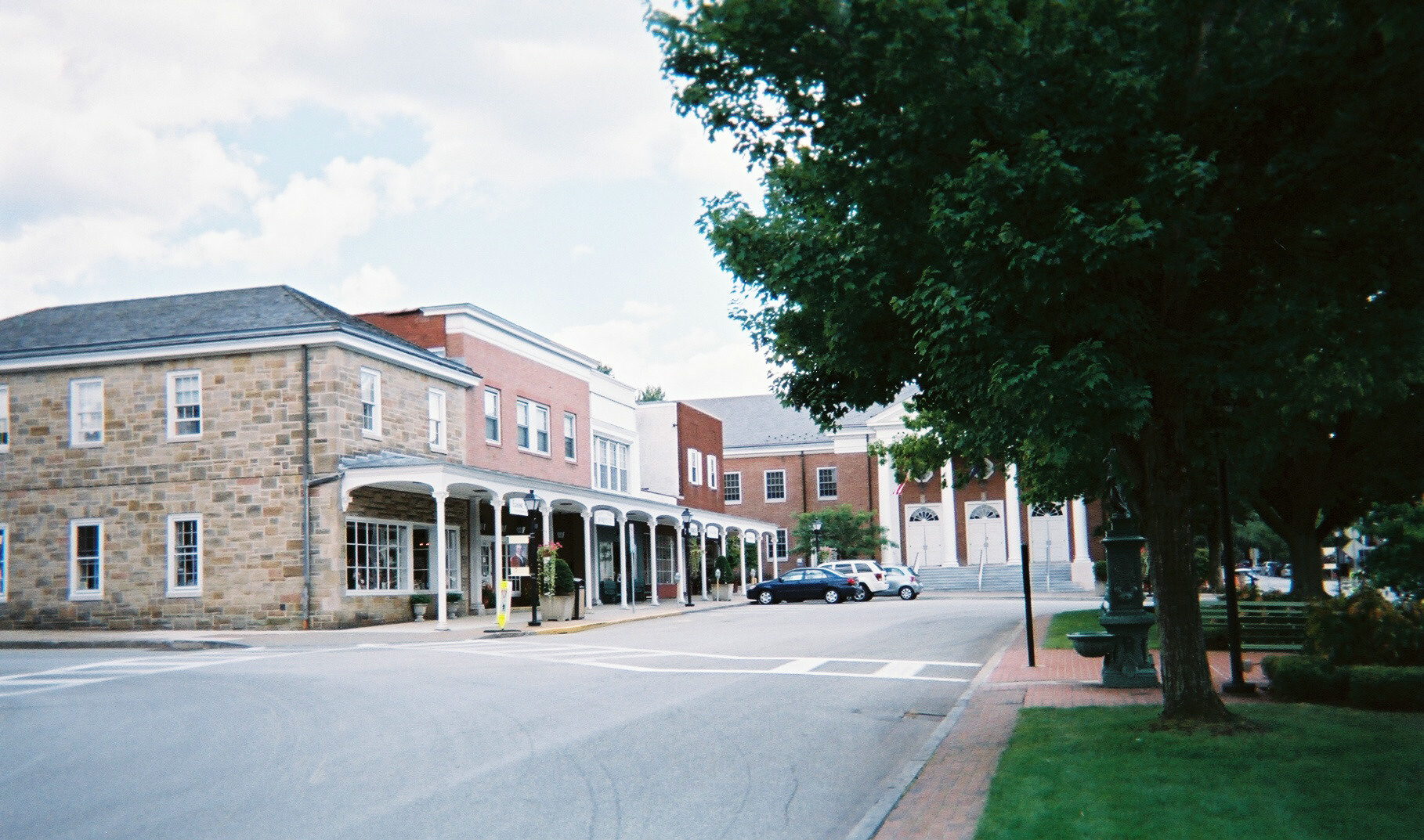
Ligonier's downtown with the Town Hall in the background.

== Geography ==
The Borough of Ligonier is entirely surrounded by Ligonier Township, which is a separate municipality. According to the United States Census Bureau, the borough has a total area of 0.5 square miles (1.3 km^{2}), all land. Ligonier is located at 40°14′40″N 79°14′13″W (40.244518, -79.237067).

== Demographics ==
Historical population
Census	Pop.	Note	%±
1840	294		—
1850	378		28.6%
1860	351		−7.1%
1870	317		−9.7%
1880	634		100.0%
1890	782		23.3%
1900	1,259		61.0%
1910	1,575		25.1%
1920	1,807		14.7%
1930	1,978		9.5%
1940	2,111		6.7%
1950	2,160		2.3%
1960	2,276		5.4%
1970	2,258		−0.8%
1980	1,917		−15.1%
1990	1,638		−14.6%
2000	1,695		3.5%
2010	1,573		−7.2%
2020	1,513		−3.8%

As of the census of 2000, there were 1,695 people, 827 households, and 459 families residing in the borough. The population density was 3,482.5 inhabitants per square mile (1,344.6/km^{2}). There were 907 housing units at an average density of 1,863.5 per square mile (719.5/km^{2}). The racial makeup of the borough was 99.76% White, 0.06% Asian, and 0.18% from two or more races. Of the population, 0.35% were Hispanic or Latino of any race.

== Notable people ==
- Richard King Mellon, financier, general, and philanthropist
- Arthur St. Clair, military officer and politician
- Garrett Smithley, professional stock car racing driver
- R. C. Sproul, Reformed theologian, Christian apologist, and Presbyterian pastor

== See also ==
- Highland games
- Linn Run State Park
- McGinnis Hospital
- Mòd
