= List of sports venues in Portland, Oregon =

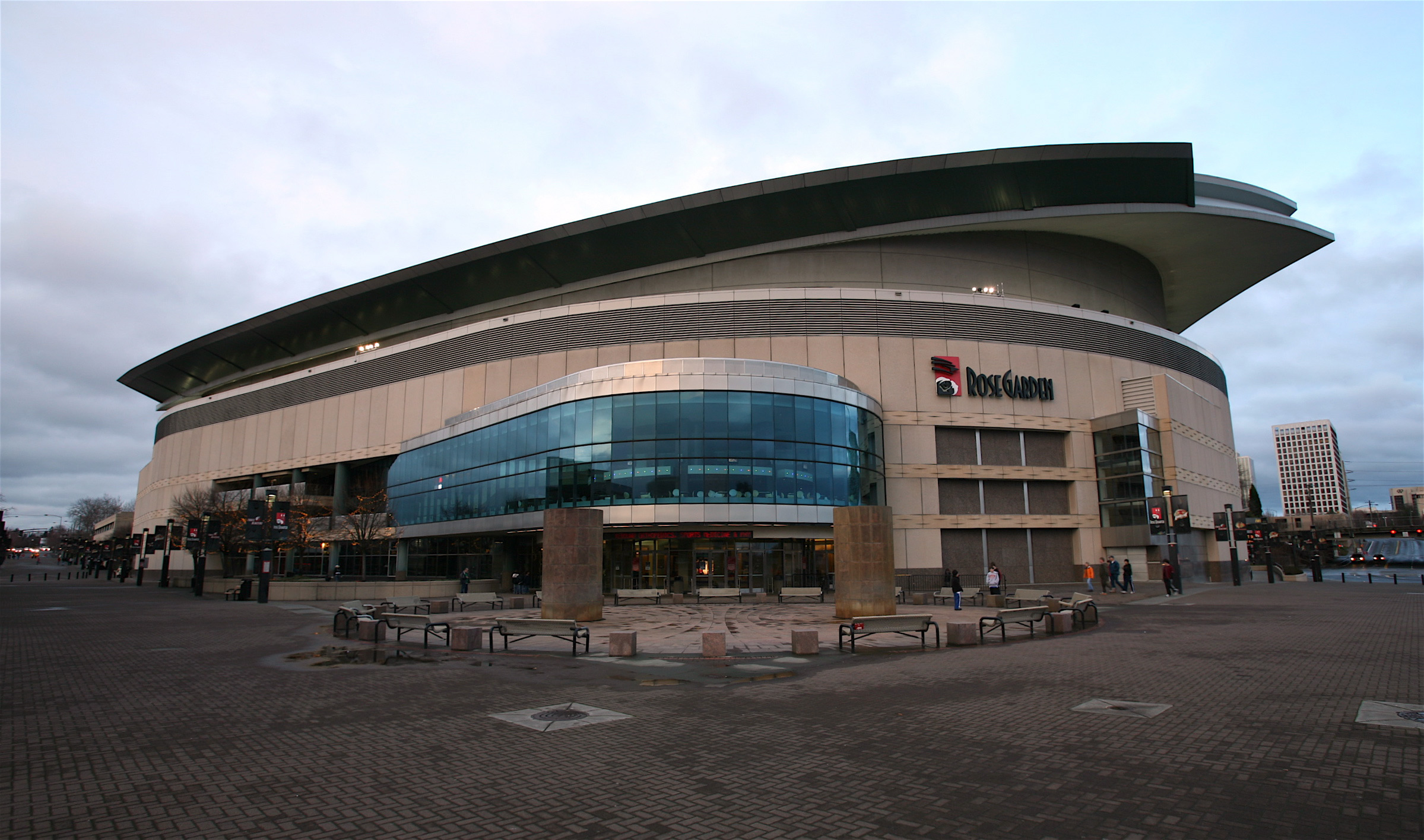
The Moda Center, formerly known as the Rose Garden, is home to several professional sports teams including the Portland Trail Blazers of the NBA.

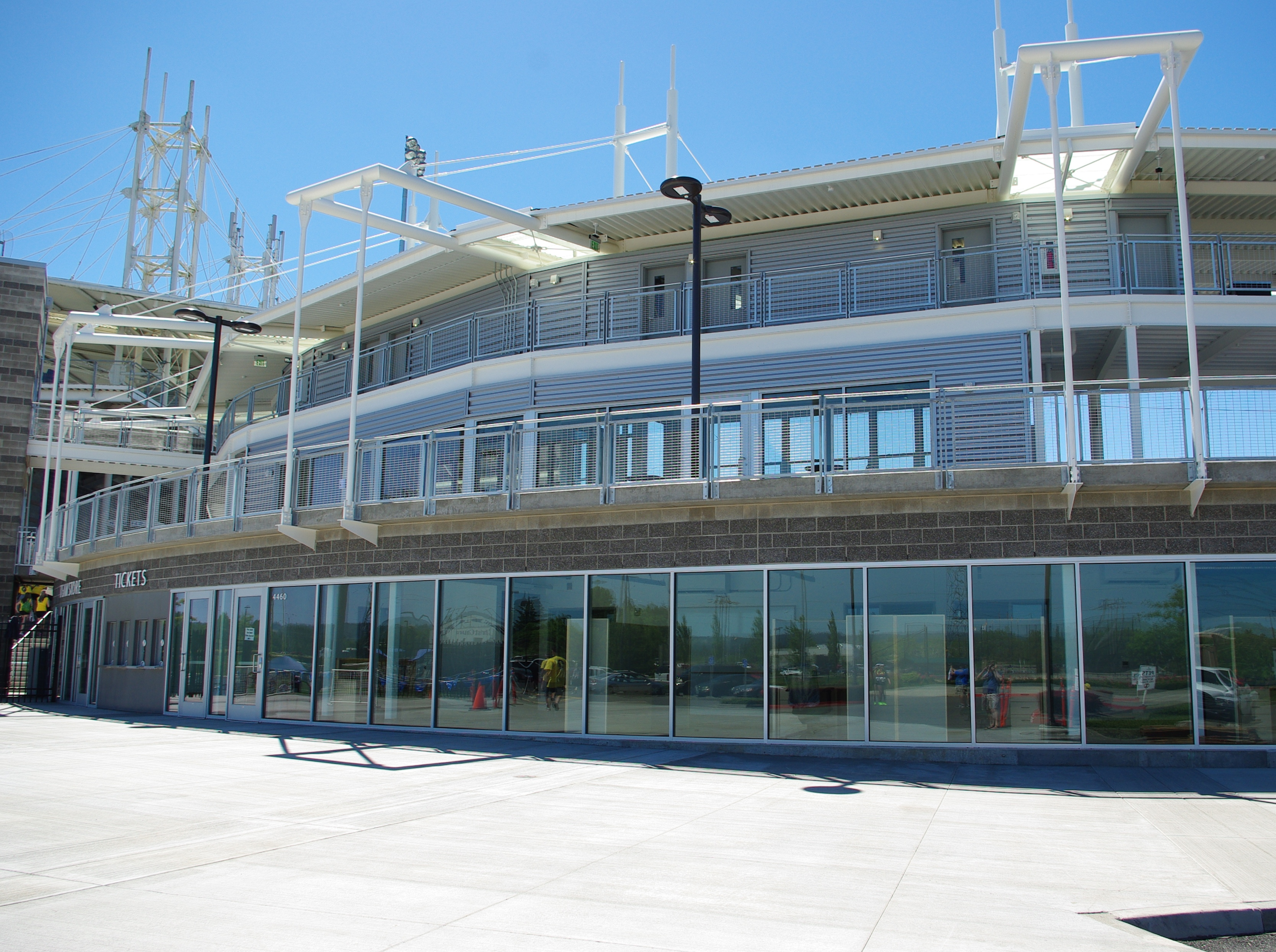
Hillsboro Ballpark, constructed in 2013, is where the minor league Hillsboro Hops baseball team played until 2025.

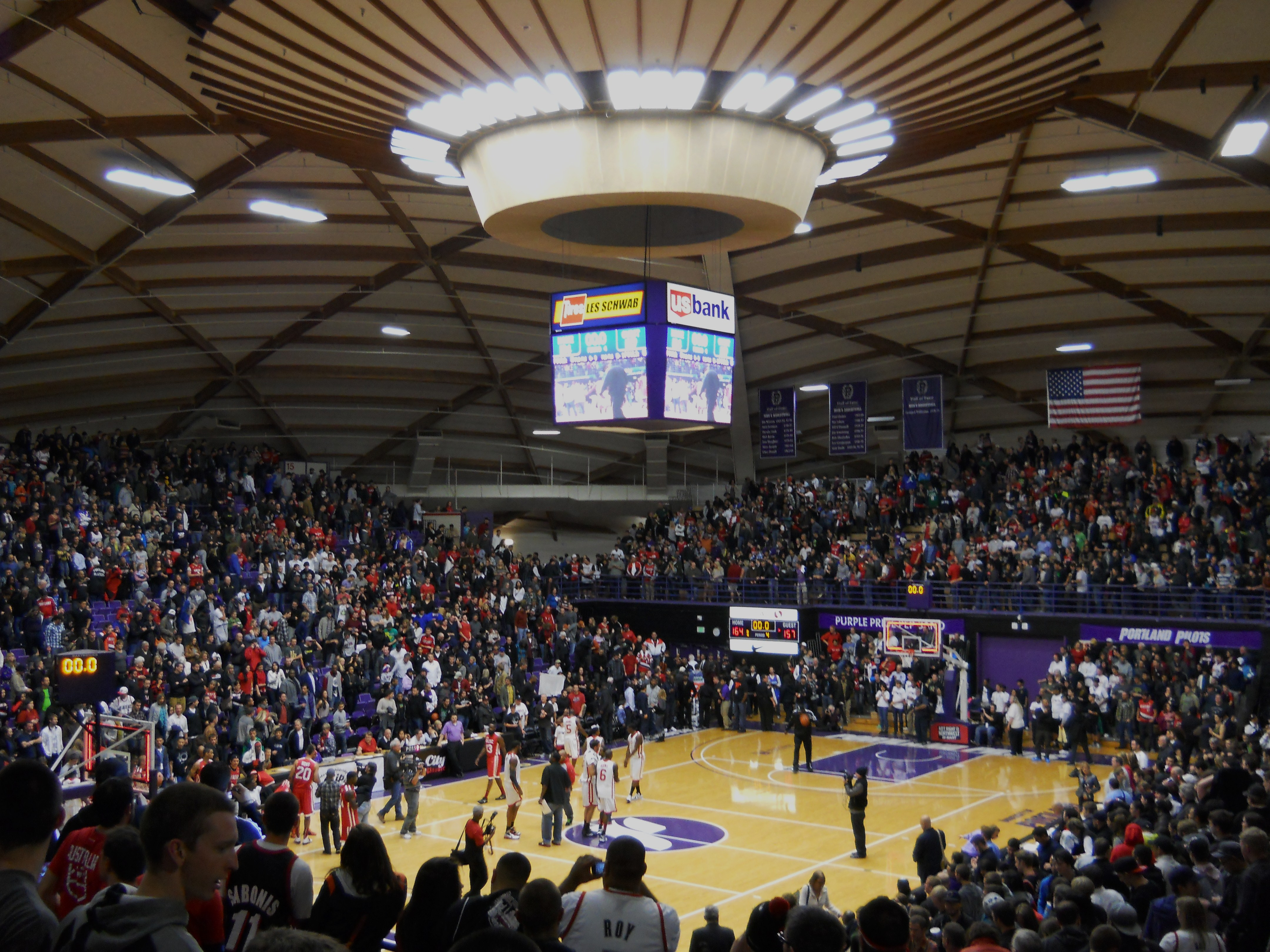
The Chiles Center in University Park is where the Portland Pilots men's and women's basketball teams play as well as the volleyball program.

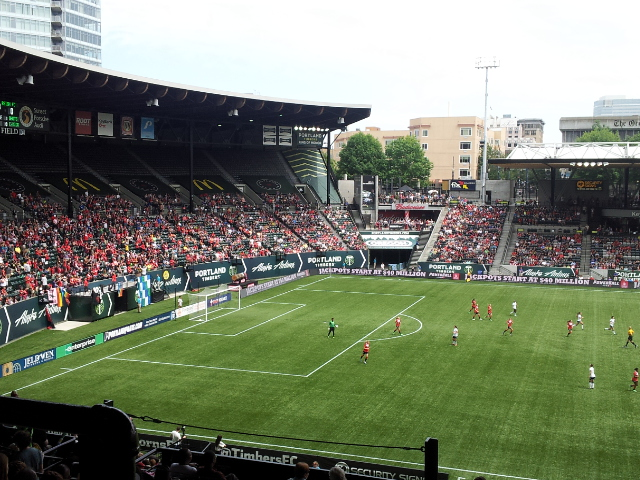
After serving primarily as a professional baseball park from 1956 through 2010, Providence Park was rebuilt into a venue that now houses a Major League Soccer and National Women's Soccer League franchise.

The following is a list of sports venues in Portland, Oregon, specifically the metro area, that are currently in operation or defunct. The city features two major sports franchises, the Portland Timbers of Major League Soccer (MLS) and the Portland Trail Blazers of the National Basketball Association (NBA). The Portland Winterhawks, who are major junior ice hockey franchise in the Western Hockey League, have played in the city since 1976 when the Edmonton Oil Kings were relocated. They are a unique team in that they have two venues, the Moda Center and the Veterans Memorial Coliseum. Providence Park, a 25,218, seat open-air stadium which is the home of the Timbers, is the largest non-auto sports venue in Portland. The Moda Center, formerly the Rose Garden, is second with 19,980 seats for basketball games and slightly less for hockey match-ups. Portland International Raceway in Hayden Meadows has the largest seating capacity (30,000) of any sporting venue in Portland. There are several golf courses in the Portland metro area, including the Portland Golf Club where the 1946 PGA Championship was held.

Besides professional sports franchises, the Portland metro area is home to several colleges and universities athletic programs. Two of those schools, the Portland State Vikings and the University of Portland Pilots are NCAA Division I classified. The Vikings basketball programs play at 2,000 seat Peter Stott Center in Downtown Portland while the Pilots basketball teams play at their 4,852 seat domed stadium the Chiles Center in University Park. The Portland State football team shares Providence Park with the professional soccer teams the Portland Timbers, the Portland Timbers U23s and the Portland Thorns FC. The NAIA Concordia University Cavaliers have one of the newest sports venues in Portland, Hilken Community Stadium, which is home to several of their athletic programs as well as Special Olympics Oregon and a local soccer club. The Stoffer Family Stadium in Newberg, where the George Fox University Bruins football team play, was opened in 2014. The Lewis & Clark Pioneers men's and women's tennis team have a unique facility, the Lewis & Clark Tennis Dome, which is an inflatable tent with translucent fabric on the ceiling for a skylight effect.

Some sports venues were converted for other uses like the Jantzen Beach Arena, and indoor ice rink and boxing venue which was leased to Toys "R" Us in 1980. Other venues like the First Regiment Armory Annex and the Vanport Extension Gymnasium had been converted into venues for sports after being used for other purposes. The Vanport Extension Gymnasium was built as a barrack during World War II but was sold to the State of Oregon who formed Vanport Extension College. The site was flooded in 1948 destroying the gymnasium. Reed Gymnasium II was also a converted barrack that was sold to Reed College following World War II. It replaced Reed Gymnasium I which was built in 1914, four years after the founding of the institution. Columbia Gymnasium was a large wood building which had a seating capacity of 1,600 built for Columbia University in 1903. It was a unique building for its time in that it served as a baseball and football field in bad weather for the Columbia Cliffdwellers sports team. It was demolished after Howard Hall was completed in 1928 which was a 2,500 seat basketball and volleyball court attached to an indoor swimming pool. While Howard Hall still stands on the campus of the now-named University of Portland it no longer serves as the home to any athletic games the Chiles Center was complete in 1985.

== Table ==
=== Key ===
Venue name (Former names)	The abridged name and any former names of the sports venue
Venue type	Indicates if the venue is open-air or enclosed
~	An approximate number
—	Information is not attributable and/or available

=== Current venues ===
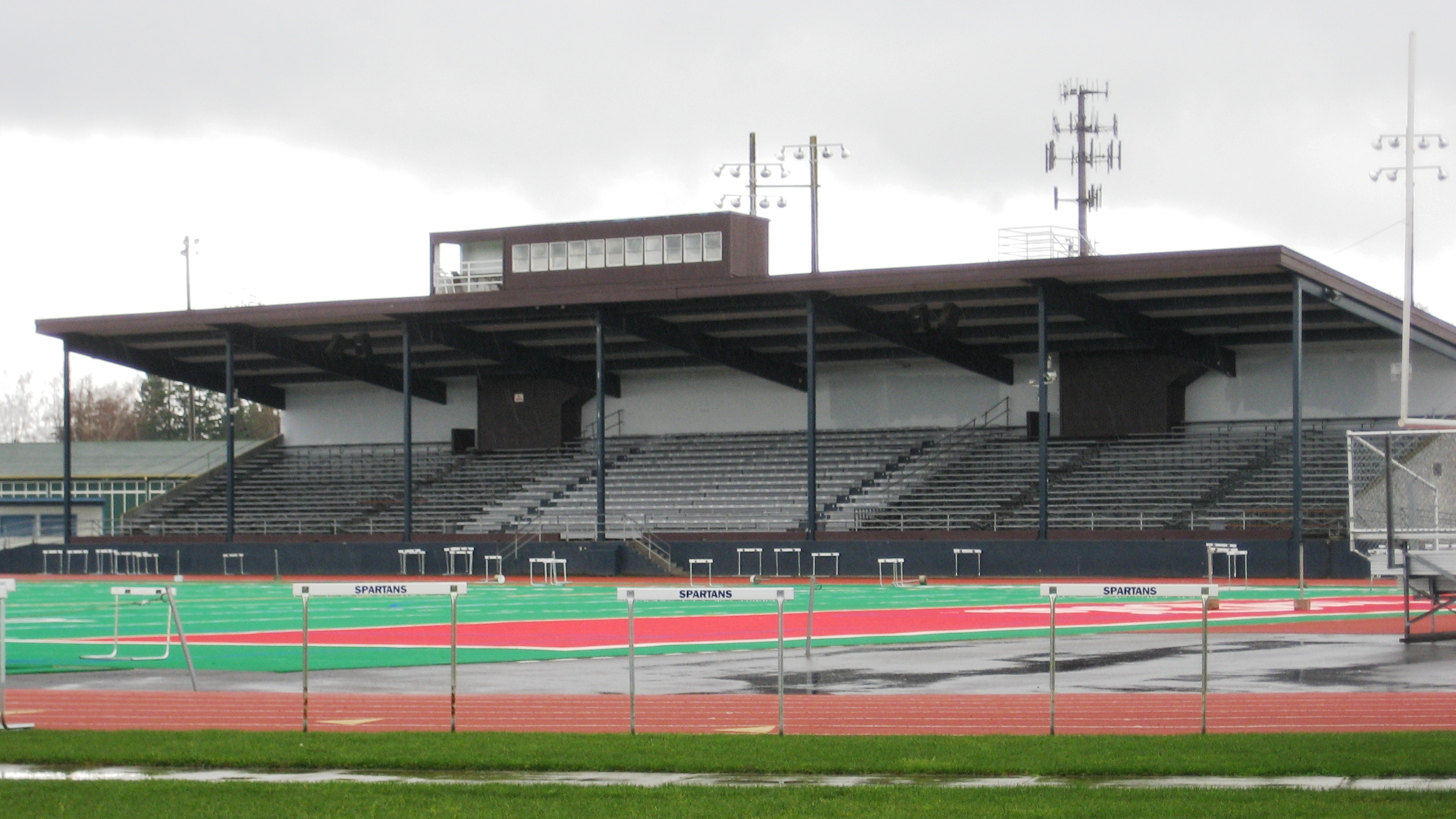
Hare Field, which opened in 1965, is owned by the Hillsboro School District.

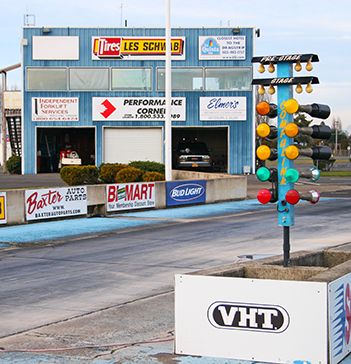
The Woodburn Dragstrip is a NHRA dragstrip in Woodburn, Oregon

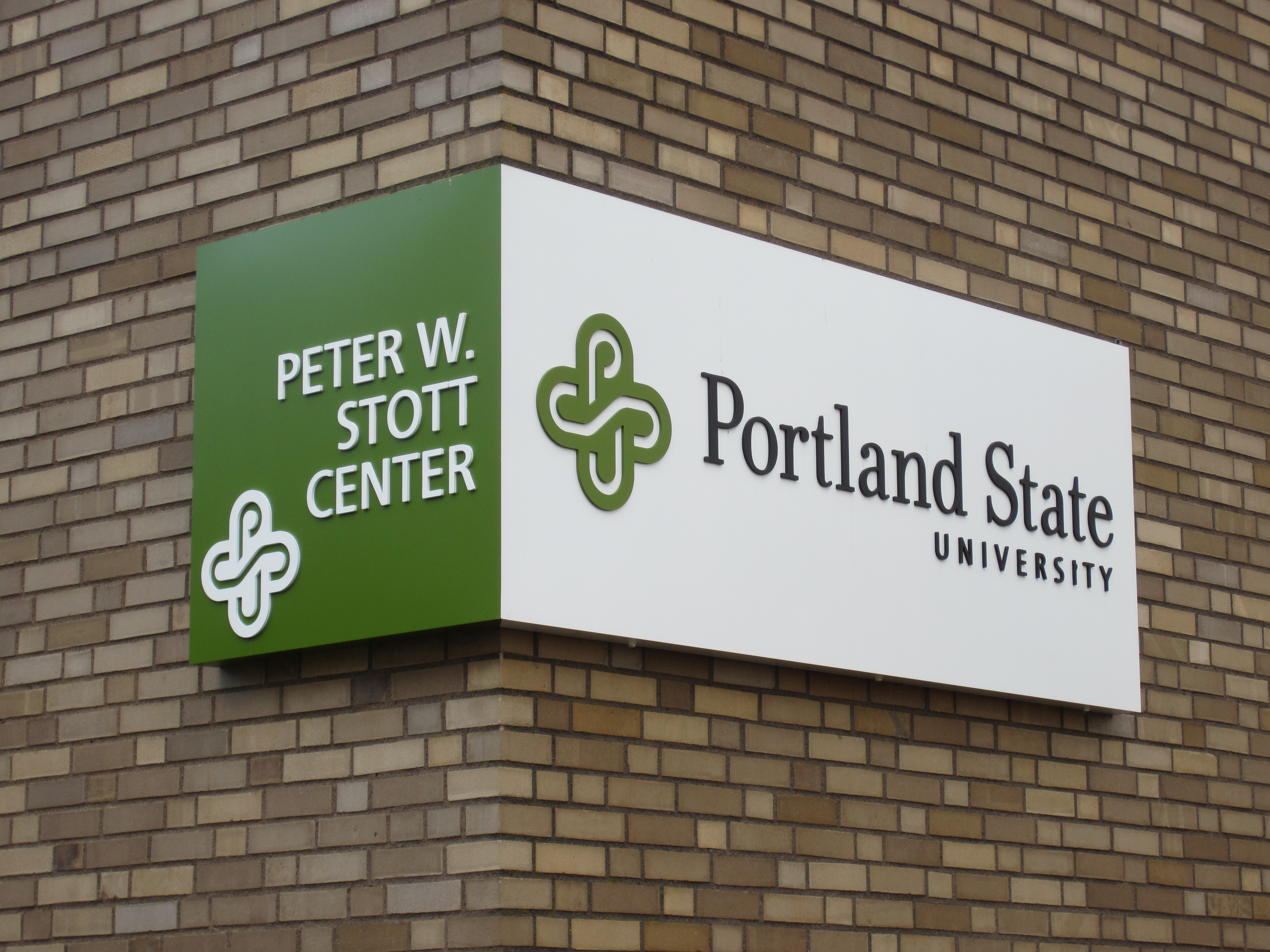
The Portland State Vikings men's and women's basketball teams play in Downtown Portland at the Stott Center.

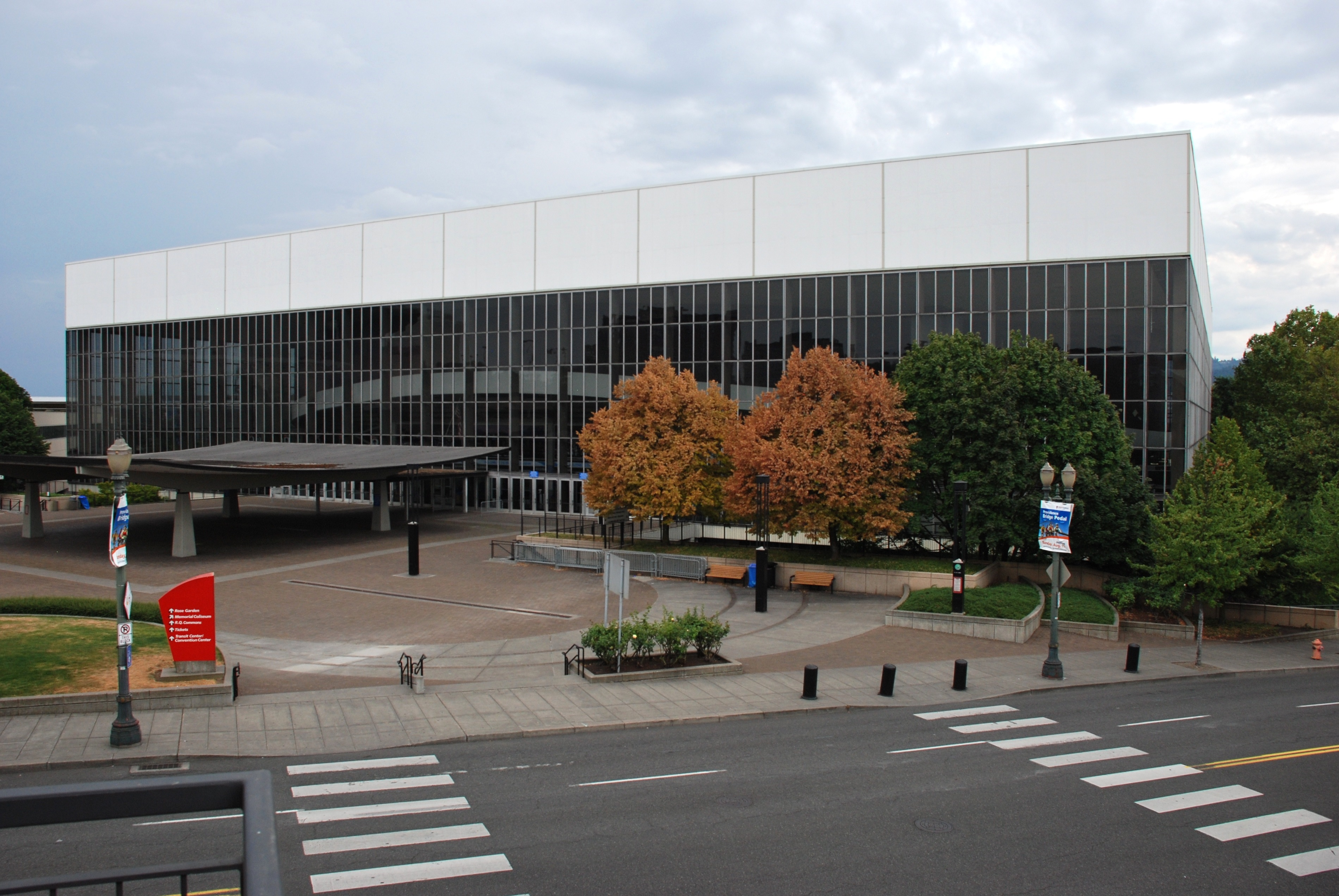
Veterans Memorial Coliseum hosted the 1965 NCAA Men's Division I Basketball Tournament final round where UCLA beat Michigan.

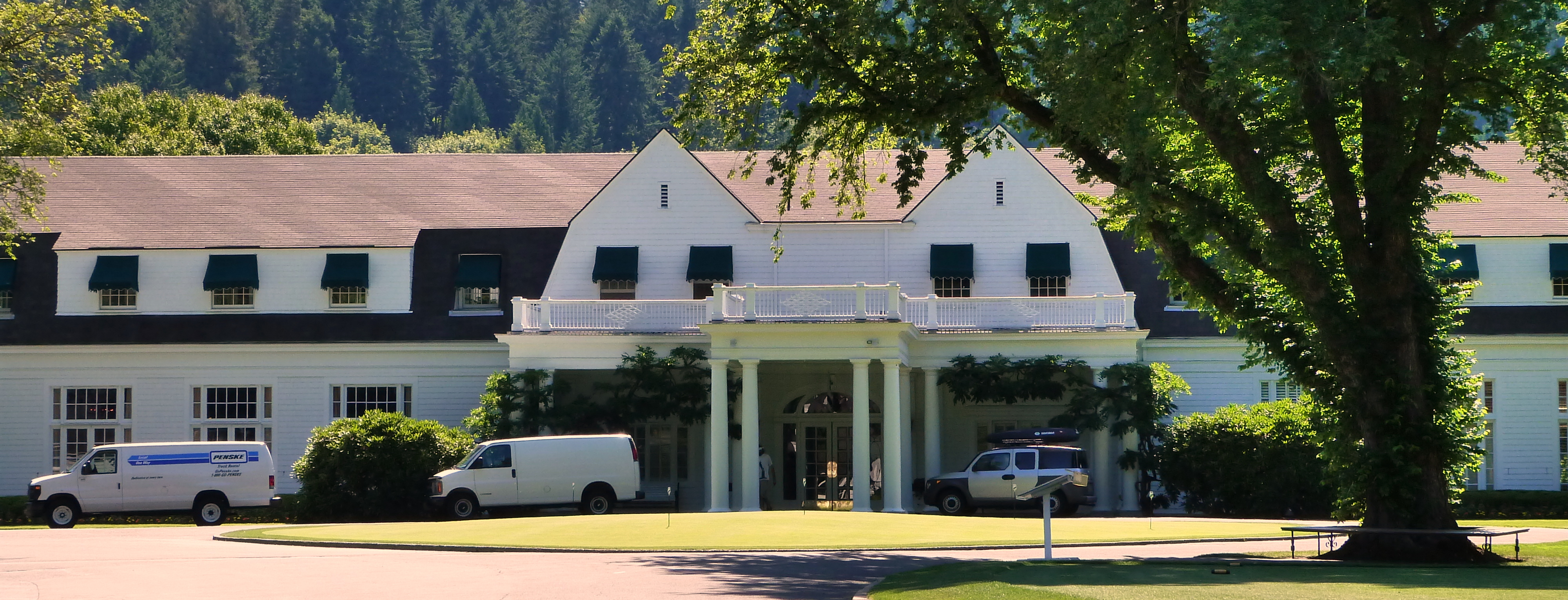
Established in 1892, Waverley Country Club is the oldest sports venue in the Portland metro area.

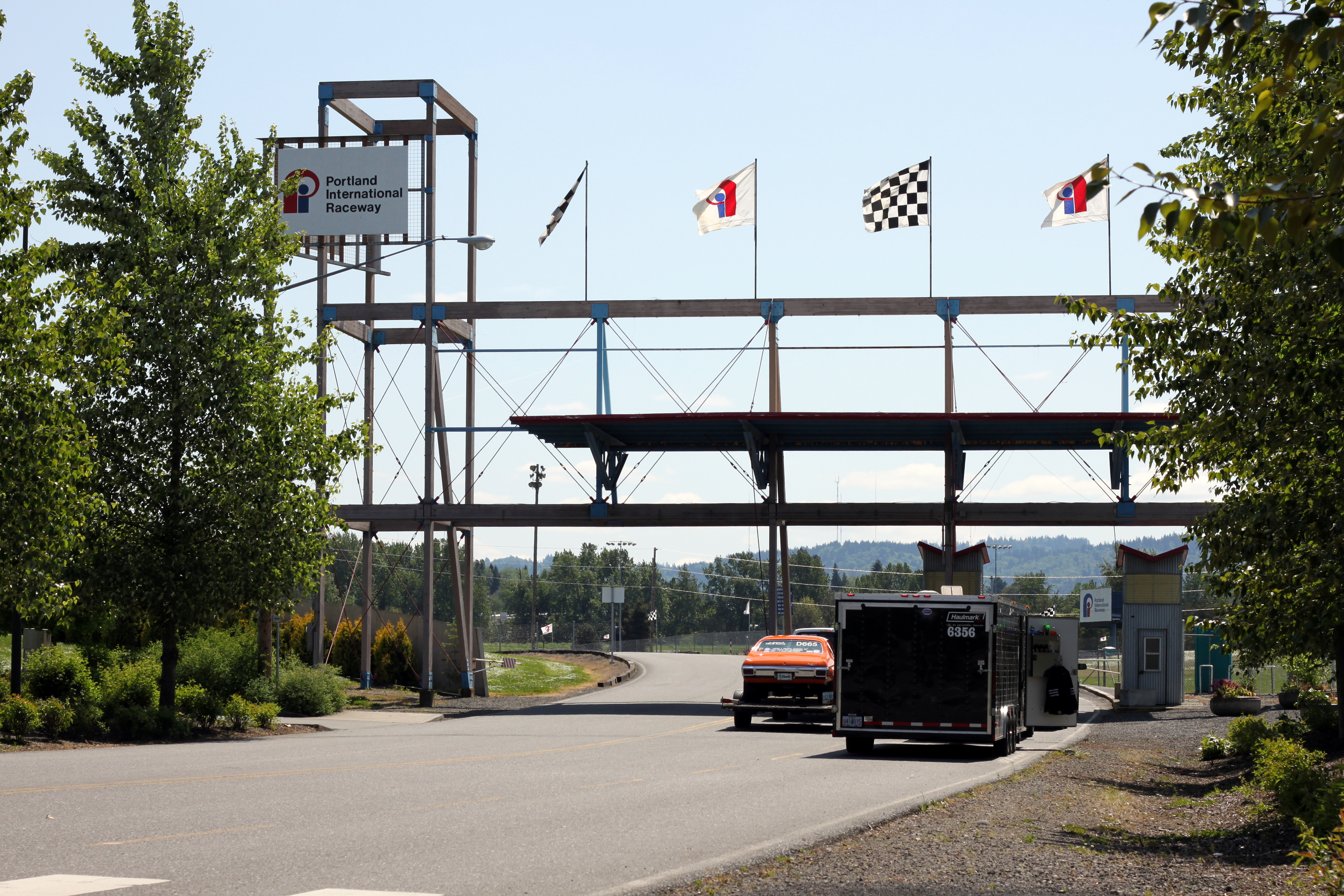
With 30,000 seats, Portland International Raceway is the largest sports venue in the Portland area.

Venue name Former name(s)	Opened	Capacity	Venue type	Tenants and events	Location	Ref
Austin Sports Complex	2010	750	open-air field	George Fox Bruins men's soccer team (2010–present); George Fox Bruins women's lacrosse team (2013–present); George Fox Bruins women's soccer team (2010–present)	Newberg	
Broadmoor Golf Course	1931	—	private golf course	—	Sunderland	
Cascade Gymnasium	2004	500~	enclosed auditorium	PCC Panthers men's basketball team PCC Panthers men's volleyball team PCC Panthers women's basketball team PCC Panthers women's volleyball team	Humboldt	
Charles Jordan Community Center Gymnasium; University Park Community Center Gymnasium	1940	100	enclosed auditorium	Portland Parks & Recreation; DOA Pro Wrestling	University Park	
Chehalem Glenn Golf Course	2005	—	private golf course	George Fox Bruins men's golf team (2007–present); George Fox Bruins women's golf team (2006–present)	Newberg	
Chiles Center	1984	4,852	enclosed dome	Portland Pilots men's basketball team (1984–present); Portland Pilots women's basketball team (1984–present); Portland Pilots women's volleyball team (1984–present)	University Park	
Chuck Bafaro Stadium	2008	500	open-air stadium	Pacific University Boxers baseball team (2008–present)	Forest Grove	
Claremont Golf Course	1993	—	public golf course	—	Oaks Hill	
Columbia Edgewater Country Club	1925	—	private golf course	Oregon Open (1929–30); Portland Open (1961–63, 1966); Northwest Open (1963, 1970); Safeway Classic (1974–2008, 2013)	East Columbia	
Colwood National Golf Club	1929	—	public golf course	—	Sunderland	
Concordia Gymnasium	1950	1,000	enclosed auditorium	Concordia Cavaliers men's basketball team (2011–present); Concordia Cavaliers women's basketball team (2011–present)	Alberta	
East Portland Community Center Gymnasium	1998	100	enclosed auditorium	Portland Parks & Recreation	Mill Park	
Eastmoreland Golf Course	1917	—	public golf course	Lewis & Clark Pioneers men's golf team Lewis & Clark Pioneers women's golf team	Sellwood	
Erv Lind Stadium	1948	500	open-air softball field	Portland State Vikings softball team	Rose City Park	
Fred G. Meyer Memorial Club Gymnasium	1992	500	enclosed auditorium	Boys & Girls Clubs of Portland Metropolitan Area	Sellwood	
Forest Grove Aquatic Center	2001	—	enclosed pool	Pacific Boxers men's swimming team Pacific Boxers women's swimming team	Forest Grove	
Fulton Park Community Center Gymnasium; Fulton Park Elementary School Gymnasium	1914	—	enclosed auditorium	Portland Parks & Recreation	Hillsdale	
Glendoveer Golf Course	1923	—	public golf course	—	Glenfair	
Gordon Faber Recreation Complex (Field 4)	1997	—	Open-air field	Portland State Vikings softball	Hillsboro	
Griswold Stadium	1953	3,500	open-air stadium	Lewis & Clark Pioneers football team (1953–present); Lewis & Clark Pioneers men's soccer team Lewis & Clark Pioneers women's soccer team	Collins View	
Hare Field	1965	5,000	open-air stadium	Hillsboro High School baseball team Glencoe High School baseball team	Hillsboro	
Heron Lakes Golf Club; West Delta Park Golf Course	1971	—	public golf course	Portland Parks & Recreation	Hayden Meadows	
Hilken Community Stadium	2012	1,000	open-air stadium	Concordia Cavaliers baseball team (2012–present); Concordia Cavaliers football team (2012–present); Concordia Cavaliers men's soccer team (2012–present); Concordia Cavaliers softball team (2012–present); Concordia Cavaliers women's soccer team (2012–present); Northeast United Soccer (2012–present); Portland Riptide AUDL (2018–present)	Sunderland	
Ron Tonkin Field; Hillsboro Ballpark (2013)	2013	3,534–4,500	open-air stadium	Hillsboro Hops (2013–2025)	Hillsboro	
Hillsboro Hops Ballpark	2026	7,000	open-air stadium	Hillsboro Hops (2026–present)	Hillsboro	
Hillsboro Stadium	1999	7,600	open-air stadium	Pacific Boxers football team (2007); Portland State Vikings football team (2000, 2010, 2018–present)	Hillsboro	
Holce Tennis Courts	2009	—	open-air enclosed	Pacific Boxers men's tennis team (2009–present); Pacific Boxers women's tennis team (2009–present)	Forest Grove	
Huston Sports Complex	1970~	100~	open-air field	Lewis & Clark Pioneers baseball team (1980–present); Lewis & Clark Pioneers softball team (1976–present)	Collins View	
Interstate Lanes; Interstate Bowl	1954	26 lanes	enclosed bowling alley	United States Bowling Congress	Arbor Lodge	
Joe Etzel Field; Pilot Stadium (1988–2004)	1988	1,000	open-air stadium	Portland Pilots baseball team (1988–present)	University Park	
King City Golf Course	1966	—	semi-private golf course	—	King City	
Langdon Farms Golf Club	1995	—	public golf course	Portland State Vikings men's golf team Portland State Vikings women's golf team	Aurora	
Charles B. Walker Stadium at Lents Park	1956	2,000	open-air baseball stadium	Portland Pickles	Lents	
Lewis & Clark Tennis Dome	2011	—	inflated dome	Lewis & Clark Pioneers men's tennis team (2012–present); Lewis & Clark Pioneers women's tennis team (2012–present)	Collins View	
Lincoln Park Stadium	2006	1,100	open-air stadium	Pacific Boxers football team (2006–present); Pacific Boxers men's soccer team (2006–present); Pacific Boxers women's lacrosse team (2006–present); Pacific Boxers women's soccer team (2006–present)	Forest Grove	
Louisiana–Pacific Tennis Center	1985	—	enclosed	Portland Pilots men's tennis team (1985–present); Portland Pilots women's tennis team (1985–present)	University Park	
Lytle Gymnasium		2,430	enclosed auditorium	Multnomah Lions men's basketball team Multnomah Lions women's volleyball team	Montavilla	
Matt Dishman Community Center Gymnasium; Knott Street Community Center Gymnasium	—	1950	enclosed auditorium	Portland Parks & Recreation	Eliot	
Meriwether National Golf Club	1961	—	public golf course	2008 Pacific Invitational	Hillsboro	
Merlo Field	1990	4,892	open-air stadium	2001 NCAA Division I Women's Soccer Championship; 2003 NCAA Division I Women's Soccer Championship; Portland Pilots men's soccer team (1990–present); Portland Pilots women's soccer team (1990–present)	University Park	
Moda Center; Rose Garden (1995–2013)	1995	19,980	enclosed stadium	Portland Trail Blazers (1995–present); Portland Winterhawks (1995–present); Portland Forest Dragons (1997–99); Portland Pythons (1998–99); Portland Fire (2000–02); Portland LumberJax (2006–09); Portland Steel (2014–16); 2009 NCAA Men's Division I Basketball Tournament; 2012 NCAA Men's Division I Basketball Tournament; Portland Fire (2026–present)	Lloyd District	
Morse Athletic Fields	1989	100–250	open-air field	George Fox Bruins baseball team (1989–present); George Fox Bruins softball team (1989–present)	Newberg	
Oaks Park Roller Rink; The Oaks Rink	1905	—	enclosed roller rink		Sellwood	
Oswego Lake Country Club	1926	—	private golf course	—	Lake Oswego	
Owens Sports Complex at Delta Park	1950	100~	open-air field	Portland Parks & Recreation (1950–present)	Delta Park	
Pamplin Sports Center	1968	2,300	enclosed auditorium	Lewis & Clark Pioneers men's basketball team (1968–present); Lewis & Clark Pioneers women's basketball team (1968–present); Lewis & Clark Pioneers women's volleyball team (1968–present)	Collins View	
Viking Pavilion	1966	3,000	enclosed auditorium	Portland State Vikings men's basketball team (1966–present); Portland State Vikings women's basketball team (1966–present)	Downtown	
Portland Golf Club	1912	—	private golf course	1931 Western Amateur; 1934 Women's Western Open; 1946 PGA Championship; 1947 Ryder Cup; 1955 Western Open; 1969 Alcan Golfer of the Year Championship; 1982 U.S. Senior Open; 1999 U.S. Senior Amateur; Portland Open Invitational (1944–45, 1947–48, 1959–60, 1964–65); Portland Classic (1972–73, 1975–76); Fred Meyer Challenge (1986–1991)	Raleigh Hills	
Portland Indoor Soccer Center; Imperial Rink	1926	100	enclosed soccer field and roller rink	professional roller skating (pre-1985)	Buckman	
Portland International Raceway	1960	30,000	auto track	Grand Prix of Portland (1984–2007, 2018–present); NASCAR Truck Series (1999–2000); NASCAR K&N Pro Series West; Various Road, MTB, and Cyclocross Bicycle Races	Hayden Meadows	
Portland Meadows Golf Course	1961	—	public golf course	—	Hayden Meadows	
Portland Tennis Center	1973	—	enclosed and open-air tennis courts	Portland Parks & Recreation	Buckman	
Providence Park; Jeld-Wen Field (2010–2014); PGE Park (2001–10); Civic Stadium (1966–2001); Multnomah Stadium (1926–1966); Multnomah Field (pre 1926)	1926	25,218	open-air stadium	Portland Timbers (1975–1982, 1985–1990, 2001–present); Portland Thorns FC (2013–present); Portland Beavers (1956–1972, 1978–1993, 2001–2010); Portland Rockies (1995–2000); Portland Breakers (1985); Portland State Vikings football (until 2017)	Goose Hollow	
Pumpkin Ridge Golf Club	1992	—	golf course	1996 U.S. Amateur; 1997 U.S. Women's Open; 2003 U.S. Women's Open; 2006 U.S. Women's Amateur; Safeway Classic (2009–2012)	North Plains	
Randall Hall	1972	500~	enclosed	CCC Cougars men's basketball team (1972–present); CCC Cougars men's wrestling team (1972–present); CCC Cougars women's basketball team CCC Cougars wrestling team (1972–present)	Oregon City	
Reed Gymnasium II	1948	750	enclosed auditorium	Reed Griffins basketball team (1948–present)	Reed	
Redtail Golf Course	1968	—	public golf course	—	Beaverton	
Rock Creek Country Club	1958	—	private golf course	—	Rock Creek	
Roosevelt High School Gymnasium	1950	1,000	enclosed auditorium	Roosevelt Rough Riders men's basketball team Roosevelt Rough Riders women's basketball team Roosevelt Rough Riders women's volleyball team	St. Johns	
Rose City Golf Course	1922	—	public golf course	City of Portland	Rose City Park	
Sckavone Stadium; Westmoreland Baseball Park; Sckavone Field	1939	1,000	open-air baseball stadium	Portland Parks & Recreation	Sellwood	
Sherman–Larkins Stadium	2008	300	open-air stadium	Pacific Boxers softball team (2008–present)	Forest Grove	
Shute Park Aquatic & Recreation Center	1981	—	enclosed and open-air pool	City of Hillsboro	Hillsboro	
St. Johns Racquet Center	1980	—	enclosed tennis courts	Portland Parks & Recreation	St. Johns	
Stoffer Family Stadium	2014	1,200	open-air stadium	George Fox Bruins football team (2014–present)	Newberg	
Stoller Center	1970	2,500	enclosed auditorium	Pacific Boxers men's basketball team (1970–present); Pacific Boxers men's wrestling team Pacific Boxers women's basketball team Pacific Boxers women's wrestling team Pacific Boxers volleyball team	Forest Grove	
Stott Community Field	1998	—	open-air field	Portland State Vikings football team (practice); Portland State Vikings men's soccer team (practice); Portland State Vikings women's soccer team (practice)	Downtown Portland	
Summerfield Golf & Country Club	1973	—	semi-private golf course	—	Tigard	
The Dome; Mt. Hood Community College Gymnasium	1966	2,000	enclosed dome	Mt. Hood CC Saints men's basketball team (1966–present); Mt. Hood CC Saints women's basketball team (1966–present)	Gresham	
The Reserve Vineyards and Golf Club	1997	—	golf course	Fred Meyer Challenge (1998–2002); JELD-WEN Tradition (2003–06)	Aloha	
Tualatin Indoor Soccer	2003	80	enclosed soccer field	—	Tualatin	
Veterans Memorial Coliseum	1960	10,400	enclosed glass arena	1961 NCAA Men's Division I Basketball Tournament; 1965 NCAA Men's Division I Basketball Tournament; 1975 NCAA Men's Division I Basketball Tournament; Portland Buckaroos (1960–1975); Portland Trail Blazers (1970–1995); Portland Winterhawks (1976–present); Portland Power (1996–98)	Lloyd District	
Waverley Country Club	1896	—	golf course	1952 U.S. Women's Amateur; 1964 U.S. Senior Amateur; 1970 U.S. Amateur; 1981 U.S. Women's Amateur; 1993 U.S. Junior Amateur; 2000 U.S. Women's Amateur	Sellwood	
Wheeler Sports Center	1977	2,750	enclosed auditorium	George Fox Bruins men's basketball team (1977–present); George Fox Bruins women's basketball team (1977–present); George Fox Bruins volleyball team (1977–present)	Newberg	
Woodburn Dragstrip	1961	—	dragstrip	NHRA	Woodburn	

=== Defunct venues ===
Venue name Former name(s)	Opened	Closed	Capacity	Venue type	Tenants and events	Location	Ref
Alpenrose Velodrome	1967	2021		Outdoor Velodrome	Track Cycling	Hayhurst	
Columbia Coliseum	1903	1927	1,600	enclosed auditorium	Columbia Cliffdwellers football team^{[a]} (1903–1928); Columbia Cliffdwellers baseball team^{[a]} (1903–1928); Columbia Cliffdwellers men's basketball team (1903–1928)	University Park	
Exposition Rink	1905	1910	3,000	enclosed roller rink	1910 Portland Rose Festival amateur boxing matches	Guild's Lake	
First Regiment Armory Annex	1891	—	5,000	enclosed auditorium	Portland Indians (1946–48)	Downtown Portland	
Hester Gymnasium	1948	1977	1,000	enclosed auditorium	George Fox Bruins men's basketball team George Fox Bruins women's basketball team	Newberg	
Howard Hall	1928	1985	2,500	enclosed auditorium	Columbia Cliffdwellers basketball team (1928–1935); Portland Pilots men's basketball team (1935–1985)	University Park	
Jantzen Beach Arena (Jantzen Beach Ice Arena)	1973	1979^{[b]}	5,000	enclosed arena and racetrack	K&N Pro Series West (1967, 1969–70); Portland Winterhawks (practice only, 1976–79)	Jantzen Beach	
Lewis & Clark College Gymnasium	1947	1966	1,200	enclosed auditorium	Lewis & Clark men's basketball team Lewis & Clark women's basketball team	Collins View	
Portland Civic Auditorium; Portland Municipal Auditorium; Portland Public Auditorium	1917	—	4,500	enclosed auditorium	professional boxing (after 1929)	Downtown Portland	
Portland Ice Arena (Portland Ice Hippodrome)	1914	1953	3,280	enclosed arena	Portland Rosebuds (1914–18); Portland Penguins (1928–1941)	Northwest	
Portland Meadows	1946	2019	4,450	horse track	The Stronach Group	Hayden Meadows	
Portland Speedway	1924	2001	3,500	racetrack	K&N Pro Series West (1956–1969); NASCAR Winston West Series (1971–2000); NASCAR Craftsman Truck Series (1995–98)	Hayden Meadows	
Reed Gymnasium I	1914	1947	—	enclosed auditorium	Reed Griffins basketball team (1914–1947)	Reed	
Rose City Speedway	1910	1921	—	auto race track	—	Rose City Park	
Vanport Extension Gymnasium	1946^{[c]}	1948^{[c]}	500	enclosed auditorium	Vanport Vikings basketball team (1946–49)	Vanport	
Vaughn Street Park	1901	1956	12,000	open-air stadium	Portland Beavers (1903–1956); Portland Colts (1909, 1911–14); Portland Rosebuds (1946)	Northwest	

== Notes ==
- ^{a} The Columbia University football and baseball teams used Columbia Gymnasium in bad weather.
- ^{b} Jantzen Beach Arena was sold to the owners of the Jantzen Beach Shopping Center in 1975 who leased it to Toys "R" Us in 1980. The building was converted into a storefront and the "closed" date refers to when it ceased operations as a sports venue.
- ^{c} Before Vanport Extension College, the buildings were built for World War II purposes. The "opened" date indicates when the facility was used for sports. After the Vanport Flood in 1948, the gymnasium was destroyed by water damage.
