= Broadmoor Golf Club, Seattle =

Private golf club in Seattle, Washington

Broadmoor Golf Club
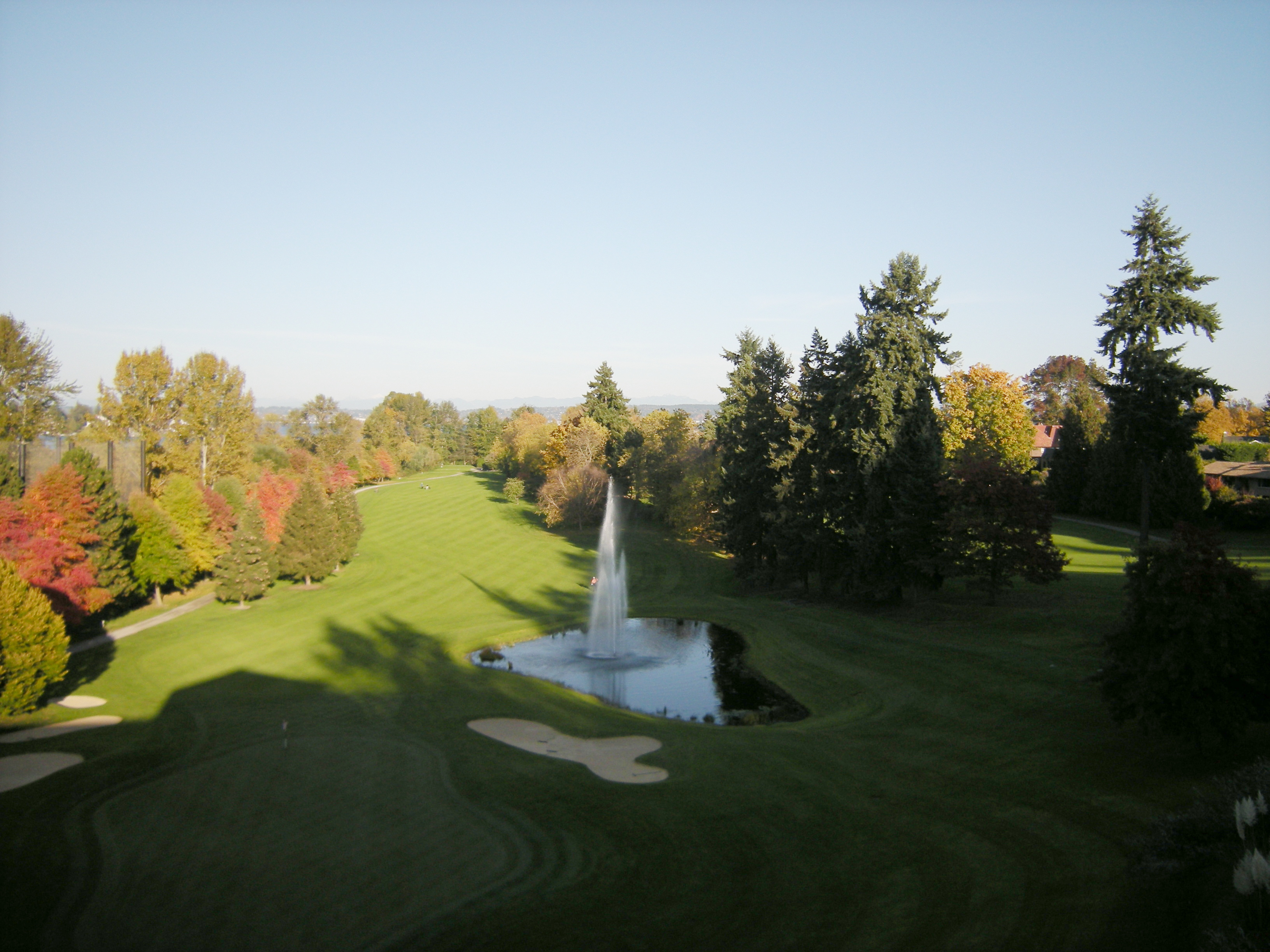
- Final hole from clubhouse in 2008

- Location within the United States Location within Washington (state)
- 47.64°N 122.292°W

Club information
- Location: Seattle, Washington, U.S.
- Elevation: 35–150 feet (10–45 m)
- Established: 1924, 102 years ago 1927 (course opens)
- Type: Private
- Tota holes: 18
- Tournaments: Seattle Open
- Website: broadmoorgolfclub.com
- Designed by: A.V. Macan
- Par: 70
- Length: 6,427 yards (5,877 m)
- Course rating: 72.3
- Slope rating: 127
- Course record: 59 - Fred Couples (August 18, 2015)

Broadmoor Golf Club is a private golf club in the northwest United States in Seattle, Washington, founded in 1924 and opened for play in April 1927. It is located in the Broadmoor neighborhood of Seattle, just south of the University of Washington and west of Lake Washington.

Broadmoor is a tribute to designer/builder A. Vernon "Mac" Macan, a leading golf course architect of the time. Born in Dublin, Ireland, in 1882, Macan was a highly educated man, attending Shrewsbury and studying law at Trinity College. In 1908, Macan emigrated to Canada, and was the architect for many golf courses in British Columbia and the northwestern U.S., including Royal Colwood, Inglewood, Fircrest, Columbia Edgewater, Hillcrest, and Colwood National.

Golf history hosted at Broadmoor over the years includes the $10,000 Seattle Open in 1945 with Byron Nelson, Jug McSpaden, Ben Hogan, and Sam Snead. Nelson took the tournament with a new world's record of 259 for 72 holes, 21 under par, and a victory margin of thirteen strokes. He won a record eighteen tournaments in 1945, including eleven consecutive.

In 1952 at the LPGA Tour's Seattle Weathervane tournament, Betsy Rawls bested Babe Zaharias. In 1954, the 52nd Western Amateur brought Jack Benny, Bing Crosby, and Phil Harris to the course. In 1961, Broadmoor hosted the 13th annual U.S. Girls' Junior and the revival of the Seattle Open, where Dave Marr shot a final round 63 (–7) and birdied the first playoff hole to win.

With the Seattle World's Fair, the Seattle Open in September 1962 attracted Arnold Palmer, Billy Casper, Tony Lema, Ken Venturi, Dave Hill, Julius Boros, Doug Sanders, along with Hollywood stars Bob Hope, James Garner, Don Cherry, Dennis Morgan and Phil Crosby, and a crowd of 6,000 for the pro-am. The tournament was won that year by 22-year-old rookie Jack Nicklaus, his second victory as a professional, following his playoff win over Palmer at the U.S. Open in June. Nicklaus had won $50,000 in the exhibition World Series of Golf the week before, and won in Portland the following week for his third tour title. The Seattle Open was held for the last time at Broadmoor in 1964 and Billy Casper claimed the winner's circle; the tournament continued for two more years, at Inglewood and Everett.

The U.S. Women's Amateur in 1974 brought winner Cynthia Hill (of the Broadmoor Golf Club in Colorado), Nancy Lopez, and Amy Alcott.

More recently, Broadmoor hosted the Pac-10 championship in 1989 and 1999, when Paul Casey of Arizona State lowered the course record to 60 (–10). The current record was set sixteen years later in 2015 by Seattle native Fred Couples, with a round of 59 (–11) in August.

Summary of tournaments hosted
Years	Tournament
1945, 1961, 1962, 1964	Seattle Open
1961	US Junior Girls' Championship
1974, 1984	US Women's Amateur
1994	US Senior Women's Amateur
1950, 1995, 2015	Hudson Cup
1952	Women's Weathervane Open
1954	Western Amateur
1940, 1967	PNGA Men's Amateur
1935, 1949	PNGA Women's Amateur
1960	PNGA Junior Boys' Championship
1961	PNGA Junior Girls' Championship
1979, 1989, 1999	Pac-10 Men's Championship
2007	Pac-10 Women's Championship
