= Inglewood Golf Club =

- Location within the United States Location within Washington (state)
- 47.75°N 122.255°W

Club information
- Location: Kenmore, Washington, U.S.
- Elevation: 35–260 feet (10–80 m)
- Established: 1919; 107 years ago 1921 (course opens)
- Type: Private
- Tota holes: 18
- Tournaments: Seattle Open; GTE Northwest Classic
- Website: inglewoodgolfclub.com
- Designed by: A.V. Macan and Robert Johnstone
- Par: 72
- Length: 6,808 yards (6,225 m)
- Course rating: 73.5
- Slope rating: 141
- Course record: 62 - Brian Flugstad (2009)

Inglewood Golf Club is a private golf club in the northwest United States in Kenmore, Washington. Founded 107 years ago in 1919 and opened for play in July 1921, it is located at the north end of Lake Washington, northeast of Seattle.

Inglewood was designed by A. Vernon "Mac" Macan, a leading golf course architect of the time. Born in Dublin, Ireland, in 1882, Macan was a highly educated man, attending Shrewsbury and studying law at Trinity College. In 1908, Macan emigrated to Canada, and was the architect for many golf courses in British Columbia and the northwestern U.S., including Royal Colwood, Broadmoor, Fircrest, Columbia Edgewater, Hillcrest, and Colwood National.

Tour events held at Inglewood include the PGA Tour's Seattle Open (1936, 1963, 1965), and the GTE Northwest Classic (1987–1995) on the senior tour.

== Tour events ==
Years	Tournament	Tour
1936, 1963, 1965	Seattle Open	PGA Tour
1987–1995	GTE Northwest Classic	Senior PGA Tour
