= Esmeralda Open =

Golf tournament formerly on the PGA Tour

Coordinates: 47.647°N 117.474°W

Tournament information
- Location: Spokane, Washington, U.S.
- Established: 1945
- Course: Indian Canyon Golf Course
- Par: 70 - (1947); 72 - (1945)
- Tour: PGA Tour
- Format: Stroke play - 72 holes
- Prize fund: $10,000
- Month played: August (1947); September (1945)
- Final year: 1947

Tournament record score
- Aggregate: 266 Byron Nelson (1945)
- To par: –22 Byron Nelson (1945)

Final champion
- (United States) Herman Keiser

The Esmeralda Open was a golf tournament on the PGA Tour that was played in 1945 and 1947 in Spokane, Washington. It was held at Indian Canyon Golf Course, a municipal facility designed in 1930 by Chandler Egan on the west end of the city, and opened in 1935. The Esmeralda Open was organized by the Spokane Athletic Round Table, a fraternal organization, headed by Joe Albi. The ART's emblem was a laughing horse named Esmeralda, which inspired the title of the charity tournament. The Round Table would later be instrumental in the construction of the city's Esmeralda Golf Course, opened in 1956 in northeast Spokane. It also was the driving force behind Spokane Memorial Stadium, named for Albi in 1962.

The Esmeralda Open was held annually for over a decade, but most editions featured local and regional golfers, and was not part of the PGA Tour. The first in 1943 was a 54-hole event played at Downriver, and the 1949 tournament included Bing Crosby, who was raised in Spokane. It was not held in 1944, when the 1944 PGA Championship was played at Manito Golf and Country Club in south Spokane. In 1946, Spokane and the ART hosted the first U.S. Women's Open at the Spokane Country Club, north of the city. An attempt was made to have the PGA Tour return in 1954, but was unsuccessful.

== 1945 ==
The second Esmeralda Open, and the first as a tour event, was held in September 1945. It was won by Byron Nelson by seven strokes over runner-up Harold "Jug" McSpaden, followed by Ben Hogan and Sam Snead. Nelson shot a 64 (–8) in the final round for a 266, an unofficial tour record at the time of 22-under par. His winner's share of the $10,000 event was $1,500 in cash and $2,000 in war bonds.

It was Nelson's sixteenth victory of 18 during his record-setting year. Several course records were established at the 1945 tournament. McSpaden shot a course-record 30 on his final front nine and Snead shot a final-round 63 (–9) to set another course record.

== 1947 ==
For the 1947 event, par was changed to 70 and the tournament was played in early August. Herman Keiser shot a one-under 69 on Sunday to finish at 273 (–7), one stroke ahead of three runners-up: Ben Hogan, Ed Furgol, and Johnny Palmer. Hogan electrified the gallery with an ace at the 161-yard (147 m) fourth hole in the final round. He shot a 68, but missed a putt for par from less than 2 feet (60 cm) on the final hole that would have tied Keiser.

== Winners ==
Year	Dates	Champion	Winning score	To par	Margin of victory	Runner(s)-up	Purse ($)	Winner's share ($)
1945	Sep 20–23	(United States) Byron Nelson	66-66-70-64=266	–22	7 strokes	(United States) Harold McSpaden	10,000	1,500 (& $2,000 war bond)
1947	Aug 7–10	(United States) Herman Keiser	65-69-70-69=273	–7	1 stroke	(United States) Ben Hogan (United States) Ed Furgol (United States) Johnny Palmer	10,000	2,000
