= 1944 PGA Championship =

Coordinates: 47.609°N 117.395°W

Tournament information
- Dates: August 14–20, 1944
- Location: Spokane, Washington, U.S.
- Course: Manito Golf and Country Club
- Organized by: PGA of America
- Tour: PGA Tour
- Format: Match play - 5 rounds

Statistics
- Par: 72
- Field: 78 players, 32 to match play
- Cut: 149 (+5), playoff
- Prize fund: $14,500
- Winner's share: $3,500

Champion
- (United States) Bob Hamilton
- def. Byron Nelson, 1 up

Location in the United States
Location in Washington

The 1944 PGA Championship was the 26th PGA Championship, held August 14–20 at Manito Golf and Country Club in Spokane, Washington. Then a match play championship, Bob Hamilton won his only major title, 1 up in the 36-hole final over heavily favored Byron Nelson; the winner's share was $3,500 and the runner-up's was $1,500. Hamilton defeated Jug McSpaden 2 and 1 in the quarterfinals and George Schneiter 1 up in the semifinals.

It was Nelson's third runner-up finish (1939, 1941, 1944); he won the title in 1940 and 1945. Nelson was the medalist in the stroke play qualifier with a 6-under 138.

This was the first PGA Championship in two years, it was not contested in 1943. Sam Snead won in 1942, but did not defend his title; he was at the naval hospital in San Diego for treatment for his ailing back, and received a medical discharge from the U.S. Navy a month later.

The event was sponsored by the Athletic Round Table, Spokane's notable fun and benevolence organization headed by attorney Joe Albi. Following this event, the ART sponsored the Esmeralda Open, a PGA Tour event in 1945 and 1947, and the first U.S. Women's Open in 1946, all held in Spokane.

The PGA Championship was the sole major played in 1944 (and 1945); the three others returned in 1946.

This was the first major championship played in the Pacific Northwest. The PGA Championship was played in Portland in 1946, and at Sahalee, east of Seattle, in 1998. The first U.S. Open in the region was played in 2015 at Chambers Bay, southwest of Tacoma.

== Format ==
The match play format at the PGA Championship in 1944 called for 12 rounds (216 holes) in seven days:

- Monday and Tuesday – 36-hole stroke play qualifier, 18 holes per day, field of 78 players;
  - the top 32 professionals advanced to match play, defending champion Sam Snead did not enter
- Wednesday – first round – 36 holes
- Thursday – second round – 36 holes
- Friday – quarterfinals – 36 holes
- Saturday – semifinals – 36 holes
- Sunday – final – 36 holes

== Final results ==
Sunday, August 20, 1944

Place	Player	Money ($)
1	(United States) Bob Hamilton	3,500
2	(United States) Byron Nelson	1,500
T3	(United States) Chuck Congdon	750
T3	(United States) George Schneiter	750
T5	(United States) Art Bell	500
T5	(United States) Ed Dudley	500
T5	(United States) Willie Goggin	500
T5	(United States) Jug McSpaden	500

== Final eight bracket ==
Quarter-finals; August 18
Bob Hamilton	2&1
Jug McSpaden
George Schneiter	2&1
Art Bell
Byron Nelson	4&3
Willie Goggin
Chuck Congdon	6&5
Ed Dudley

Semi-finals; August 19
Bob Hamilton	1up
George Schneiter
Byron Nelson	8&7
Chuck Congdon

Finals; August 20
Bob Hamilton	1up
Byron Nelson

== Final match scorecards ==
Morning

Hole	1	2	3	4	5	6	7	8	9	10	11	12	13	14	15	16	17	18
Par	4	4	3	4	4	4	4	5	4	5	3	4	4	4	5	3	4	4
(United States) Hamilton	4	4	3	4	4	4	4	5	4	4	3	4	4	4	4	4	4	3
(United States) Nelson	4	4	3	3	4	4	4	5	5	4	3	4	4	3	4	4	4	4
Leader	–	–	–	N1	N1	N1	N1	N1	–	–	–	–	–	N1	N1	N1	N1	–

Afternoon

Hole	1	2	3	4	5	6	7	8	9	10	11	12	13	14	15	16	17	18
Par	4	4	3	4	4	4	4	5	4	5	3	4	4	4	5	3	4	4
(United States) Hamilton	3	4	3	4	4	4	4	5	4	5	3	4	4	4	5	2	4	3
(United States) Nelson	4	4	3	4	5	4	4	4	4	5	4	3	4	4	4	3	4	3
Leader	H1	H1	H1	H1	H2	H2	H2	H1	H1	H1	H2	H1	H1	H1	–	H1	H1	H1

Birdie	Bogey
