= Hilken Community Stadium =

Stadium in Portland, Oregon, US

- Interactive map of Hilken Community Stadium
- Location: Portland, Oregon
- Coordinates: 45°34′16.7″N 122°38′14.1″W
- Owner: University of Oregon
- Capacity: 1,000
- Surface: Nike Grind

Construction
- Groundbreaking: 2011
- Opened: 2012
- Cost: US$7.5 million

Tenants
- Concordia Cavaliers baseball team (2012–2020); Concordia Cavaliers men's soccer team (2012–2020); Concordia Cavaliers women's soccer team (2012–2020); Concordia Cavaliers softball team (2012–2020); Northeast United Soccer (2012–present); Portland Bangers FC (2025–present)

Hilken Community Stadium is an American football, baseball, soccer and softball stadium located in Portland, Oregon. It served as the home of the Concordia Cavaliers football, baseball, soccer and softball teams. Concordia closed in the spring of 2020. Northeast United Soccer and Central Catholic High School baseball team also play at Hilken Community Stadium, since 2012. At the time of construction, the 1,000 seat stadium cost US$7.5 million. The field's turf is known as Nike Grind, which is made out of approximately six million recycled shoes. The university named the stadium after Robert and Virginia Hilken who donated US$1.5 million towards the construction. One million dollars was donated by the community. While the stadium is owned by Concordia University, 50 percent of the activities of the field are designated for community activities like Special Olympics.

== See also ==
- List of sports venues in Portland, Oregon
