= Eric Green (golfer) =

English golfer (1908–1980)

Personal information
- Nationality: England
- Born: 11 April 1908 Liverpool, Lancashire, England
- Died: 27 December 1980 (aged 72) St Helens, Merseyside, England

Career
- Sport: Golf
- Status: Professional
- Professional wins: 2

Best results in major championships
- Masters Tournament: DNP
- PGA Championship: DNP
- U.S. Open: DNP
- The Open Championship: T37: 1935

Eric Green (11 April 1908 – 27 December 1980) was an English professional golfer. He was on the Great Britain team for the 1947 Ryder Cup but did not play in any matches. He won the Northern Professional Championship in 1947.

== Golf career ==
In early August 1947 the P.G.A. selection committee announced a list of 14 players from which the final 10 players for 1947 Ryder Cup would be chosen. The winner of the News of the World Match Play would also be included in the list. Green was one of the 14 players in the list. Green won the Northern Professional Championship on 29 August but in early September he was not in the initial group of seven selected. Two new names were added to the list of possible players, leaving nine or ten players competing for the remaining three places. Later in September two more players were selected, which included Green, to which would be added the winner of the News of the World Matchplay.

He was assistant or professional at a number of clubs in the Liverpool area, including Liverpool Municipal, Haydock Park, Grange Park and, from 1946, professional at Huyton & Prescot Golf Club.

== Tournament wins ==
- 1947 Northern Professional Championship, Leeds Cup

== Results in major championships ==
Tournament	1935	1936	1937	1938	1939	1940	1941	1942	1943	1944	1945	1946	1947	1948	1949
The Open Championship	T37		CUT			NT	NT	NT	NT	NT	NT			CUT	

Tournament	1950	1951	1952	1953	1954	1955	1956	1957	1958	1959	1960	1961
The Open Championship	CUT						CUT		CUT			T38

Note: Green only played in The Open Championship.

Did not play

NT = No tournament
CUT = missed the half-way cut
"T" = tied
