= Joe Albi =

American attorney and civic leader

- Born: Joseph Aloysius Albi; October 5, 1892; Spokane, Washington, U.S.
- Died: May 8, 1962 (aged 69); Spokane, Washington, U.S.
- Resting place: Fairmount Memorial Park; Spokane, Washington
- Monuments: Joe Albi Stadium (& statue)
- Education: Georgetown University; J.D. 1915; Gonzaga College, 1911
- Occupation: Attorney
- Known for: civic leader, Joe Albi Stadium
- Title: President, ART (1920–62)
- Political party: Republican
- Board member of: Athletic Round Table founder, president (1920–62)
- Spouse: Mazie (Lyons) Albi (m. 1918)
- Children: 3 sons, 1 daughter
- Military career
- Allegiance: United States
- Branch: U.S. Army
- Service years: 1917–1919
- Rank: Lieutenant
- Units: Signal Corp, Aviation Section
- Conflicts: World War I (stateside)

Joseph Aloysius Albi (October 5, 1892 – May 8, 1962) was an American attorney and civic leader in Spokane, Washington.

== Early years ==
Born in Spokane, he was the son of Garibaldi and Louise (Ottoboni) Albi, immigrants from Italy who arrived in the city several years earlier. Garibaldi (1861–1923) was a railroad contractor, banker, and one of the founders of the Italian colony in the city. He and three brothers (James, John, William) arrived in Spokane in 1887.

The eldest of seven children, Joe Albi was educated in Spokane schools and graduated from Gonzaga College in 1911. He was accepted to the Georgetown University Law School in Washington, D.C., and graduated in 1915. He returned home to Spokane where he continuously practiced law until his illness, except for two years of military service in the U.S. Army flying corps during World War I.

== Athletic Round Table ==
Albi was a founder of the Athletic Round Table (ART), which led the effort to expand the presence of sports in the Spokane area. The fun-loving group was launched in 1920 (the start of Prohibition) and the fast-talking 5 ft 6 in (1.68 m) Albi was its continuing president for 42 years. The ART was best known for funding the construction of Memorial Stadium, built in 1950 in under four months, and renamed Joe Albi Stadium by the city council in the spring of 1962, several weeks before his death.

In golf, the ART brought the PGA Championship to Spokane in 1944 at Manito Country Club and the Esmeralda Open, which debuted in 1943 at Downriver and was a PGA Tour event at Indian Canyon in 1945 and 1947. It also helped establish the U.S. Women's Open, the first edition was played at the Spokane Country Club in 1946, won by Patty Berg. The ART was also key to the construction of the Esmeralda Golf Course; it bought the land in east Spokane and deeded it back to the City of Spokane. The Spokane Women's Open on the LPGA Tour was held at the new course. The group also promoted senior golf, paving the way for the future U.S. Senior Open and Champions Tour.

== Congressional primary ==
In 1942, the 5th congressional seat was vacant, following the resignation of Democrat Charles H. Leavy on August 1 to become a judge on the U.S. District Court in western Washington. Albi, 49, announced his candidacy in late July. In the three-man Republican primary in September, he was runner-up to Wenatchee fruit rancher Walt Horan, who went on to serve 22 years in Congress. Horan's victory in the general election was the first by a Republican in the district in twenty years.

== Personal ==
Albi married the former Mazie Lyons (1896–1967) of Washington, D.C., in 1918 in San Antonio, Texas, while he was in the Army. They had four children, Joseph A. Albi, Jr. (1920–1932), John Lionel Albi (1921–1923), Jaclyn Albi Flaherty (1923–2023), and Jean Joseph (J.J) Albi (1927–2011). At the time of his death, Albi had eight grandchildren and his five surviving siblings all lived in Spokane. He was the Italian consul agent for Idaho and eastern Washington from 1929 to 1941, and was active in many local organizations including the American Legion, Kiwanis, Elks, and Knights of Columbus.

== Death ==
Albi was afflicted with amyotrophic lateral sclerosis (ALS), commonly referred to as "Lou Gehrig's disease." He was hospitalized for his last seven weeks at Sacred Heart Hospital, and died at age 69. His widow Mazie died less than five years later in 1967; they are buried in Spokane in the family plot at Fairmount Memorial Park, adjacent to the west side of Joe Albi Stadium.

== Statue ==
A bronze statue of Joe Albi as a sports fan was unveiled 29 years ago in 1997 at Joe Albi Stadium. Seated several rows above the field in the southwest corner bleachers (47.70506°N 117.48342°W), the 600-pound (270 kg) slightly-larger-than-life Joe is often adorned in the school colors of competing teams.

== See also ==
- Joe Albi Stadium
