= St. Johns Racquet Center =

Indoor tennis facility in Portland, Oregon, U.S.

Portland Tennis and Education - (Formally known as the St. Johns Racquet Center)
- Interactive map of the Portland Tennis and Education - (Formally known as the St. Johns Racquet Center) area

General information
- Type: Nonprofit organization with indoor tennis and pickleball courts
- Location: Portland, Oregon, 7519 N Burlington Ave, United States
- Current tenants: Portland Tennis & Education
- Owner: City of Portland

Other information
- Number of rooms: 3 tennis courts, 4 pickleball courts

Portland Tennis and Education (PT&E) is a social impact racquet center whose mission is to foster lifelong well-being through play, learning, and connection. PT&E is located in the St. Johns neighborhood of Portland, Oregon. It opened in 1979 and is owned by the city and managed by Portland Tennis & Education (PSTE). It was previously operated by Portland Parks & Recreation and formerly known as St. Johns Racquet Center.

== History ==
In 1996, the organization Portland After-School Tennis (PAST) was founded by Dr. Ernest Hartzog, then Assistant Superintendent of Portland Public Schools. The program was created to provide access to tennis for children from low-income families through after-school programs held at schools across the Portland Public School District.

Over time, the organization expanded its mission to include educational and life-skills components alongside tennis instruction. This holistic approach led to a name change to Portland Tennis & Education (PT&E), reflecting its broader focus on youth development.

In 2009, PT&E began leasing space at St. Johns Racquet Center (SJRC) to operate a year-round tennis and tutoring program. By 2012, the organization assumed full management of the facility due to its successful stewardship and began generating revenue through public court usage to support its programs.

As of 2024, PT&E has served over 18,000 youth and families from diverse backgrounds, offering tuition-free programming that integrates academic support, mentorship, and athletics.

== See also ==
- List of sports venues in Portland, Oregon
