= Robert A. Hudson =

American executive (1887–1974)

- Born: July 27, 1887; Portland, Oregon
- Died: September 4, 1974 (aged 87); Portland, Oregon
- Occupations: Grocery packaging, wholesaling and retailing
- Years active: 1907 – 1974
- Known for: Hudson House Inc. Hudson Cup; 1947 Ryder Cup

Robert Angelo Hudson (July 27, 1887 – September 4, 1974) was a grocery industry executive and golf enthusiast based in Portland, Oregon. He is remembered for sponsoring the 1947 Ryder Cup.

== Early life and legacy ==
Hudson was born in 1887 in Portland. He began working for a wholesale grocery company at the age of 14, and at age 19 Hudson became the company's sales manager. In 1907 he founded the Hudson-Duncan Co., a wholesale produce packaging enterprise. The firm would later become Hudson House Inc.

His great-granddaughter still lives in the Portland area, but has shunned golf in favor of the Portland Thorns and Portland Timbers soccer clubs.

== Hudson House ==
In 1920 Hudson partnered with associates William Evans and Fred Meyer to form an insurance and investment firm, Hudson, Evans, and Meyer. Later, in a partnership between Robert Hudson, Fred Meyer, and Meyer's younger brother Henry Meyer, Hudson introduced the popular self-service grocery chain Piggly Wiggly to the Portland area. After Fred Meyer left the company in the late 1920s, Hudson went on to open 30 Piggly Wiggly stores in Oregon.

Hudson formed the wholesale food processing company, Hudson House Inc., as a supplier for Piggly Wiggly stores in Oregon. After Henry Meyer retired from the firm in 1966, Hudson renamed his 30 Piggly Wiggly stores the 3 Boys Market chain.

Hudson House became insolvent in the early 1970s, forcing Hudson to sell his processing plants, warehouses, and 3 Boys Markets.

== Golf activities ==
In 1944 Hudson established the Portland Open golf tournament with a $10,000 purse. Hudson played in the tournament, but the prize went to Sam Snead. Hudson again sponsored the tournament in 1945, and the prize went to Ben Hogan.

Hudson is best known for funding the 1947 Ryder Cup, a tournament that had not been played for ten years. Hudson underwrote both the British and American teams, and for his efforts he was chosen Man of the Year in 1947 by the Golf Writers Association of America.

The Hudson Cup was established in 1949 by the Pacific Northwest section of the PGA of America in Hudson's honor.

In 1951 Hudson became president of the PGA advisory committee. He is the namesake of the Hudson Trophy at the South Herts Golf Club near London. He was posthumously inducted into the Pacific Northwest Golf Hall of Fame in 1978, and in 1984 he was honored by the Oregon Sports Hall of Fame.
