= Woodburn Dragstrip =

Dragstrip in Woodburn, Oregon, U.S.

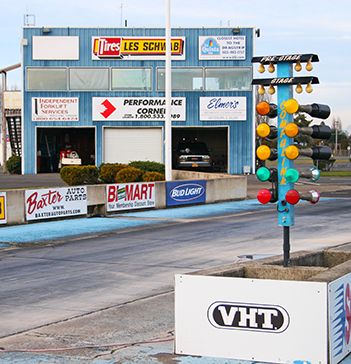
- Location: Woodburn, Oregon, United States
- Coordinates: 45.156077°N 122.906699°W
- Owner: Cherie and Joey Severance
- Address: 7730 Hwy 219 NE
- Opened: 1961
- Website: woodburndragstrip.com

Drag Strip
- Length: 0.250 mi (0.402 km)

The Woodburn Dragstrip is a quarter-mile NHRA dragstrip located in Woodburn, Oregon.

Woodburn Dragstrip opened in June 1961 as an 1/8 mi (0.20 km) dragstrip operated by the Multnomah Hot Rod Council and the Northwest Timing Association. In 1963, the track was lengthened to provide for 1/4 mi (0.40 km) drag racing. Jim Livingston purchased the Woodburn Dragstrip in 1972.

Woodburn was the first drag strip on the West Coast to use electronic scoreboards. In 1999, Livingston added track bleachers that had previously been used in Seattle Kingdome.

In 2004, the track manager estimated that Woodburn Dragstrip hosts more than 200,000 fans and participants annually, contributing more than $20 million to the local economy.

Woodburn Dragstrip has hosted NHRA Regional series (now the Lucas Oil series) events since 1977. It hosts racing events most weekends from March–October.The track is said to be on an old airstrip. Woodburn Dragstrip is co-owned by Cherie and Joey Severance.

== See also ==
- List of sports venues in Portland, Oregon
