= University Golf Club =

Golf course near Vancouver, British Columbia

Coordinates: 49.264°N 123.224°W

- University Golf Club Logo
- Interactive map of University Golf Club

Club information
- Location: Vancouver, British Columbia, Canada
- Type: Public
- Owner: Musqueam Capital Corporation
- Total holes: 18
- Website: https://universitygolf.com
- Designed by: A.V. Macan
- Par: 72

The University Golf Club is a public golf club located in Pacific Spirit Regional Park near the city of Vancouver, British Columbia, Canada and the University of British Columbia. It is owned and operated by Musqueam Capital Corporation.

The land was previously owned by UBC since 2003 when it was acquired from the province and leased to course owner David Ho since 1990

== History of the club ==
University Golf Club was designed by A.V. Macan, and was opened as a public course in 1929 by John Boyd. It was originally named Westward Ho!, but became known to the public by its current name in 1985, with the original now a namesake for the clubhouse' restaurant. The project was originally estimated to have cost little more than $70,000 to $80,000 to complete.

A phased major renovation of the course began in 2024 and continues through 2025–2026, constructed by Goodwin Golf. The renovations focus on safety and infrastructure upgrades while maintaining playability. The works include conversion of the original par-four 6th hole into a par three to address safety concerns of erratic tee shots being hit out to adjacent roadways. Extension and redesign of the former 7th hole to restore par balance is also underaway, as well as sections of the east side of the course, including the 8th hole corridor, which have been intermittently closed and played in modified form using temporary tees. The completion of the renovated course was originally targeted for spring 2026, but has been facing continuous delays.

Currently the club does not offer membership of any kind, hence the club's motto: Non-members only.

== 2007 potential close ==
The future of the course had at one point been called into question, according to an article in the Vancouver Sun newspaper published on June 27, 2007. The local Musqueam Indian Band was attempting to buy the land which the course occupies in order to build housing, however there is a land use covenant in place restricting the use of the land to a golf course for a "long-term period". The Musqueam Band offered in 2003 to buy the course on the understanding that it would honour the land use covenant.

== See also ==
- List of golf courses in British Columbia
