= Seattle Open Invitational =

Golf tournament formerly on the PGA Tour

Greater Seattle-Everett Classic
Tournament information
- Location: Everett, Washington
- Established: 1936
- Courses: Everett Golf & Country Club
- Par: 71
- Tour: PGA Tour
- Format: Stroke play
- Prize fund: US$50,000
- Month played: September
- Final year: 1966

Final champion
- (United States) Homero Blancas
- Location in the United States Location in Washington

The Seattle Open Invitational was a professional golf tournament on the PGA Tour in the northwest United States, in the greater Seattle area. It was played eight times over three decades under five names at three locations.

== History ==
The first Seattle Open was held 90 years ago in 1936 at Inglewood Golf Club in Kenmore in early August. Macdonald Smith won an 18-hole playoff with a course record 65 (–8), six strokes ahead of runner-up Ralph Guldahl, who won the next two U.S Opens (1937, 1938) and the Masters in 1939. The next Seattle Open was played nine years later in October 1945 at Broadmoor Golf Club in Seattle and won by Byron Nelson, with a world record 259 (–21) and a victory margin of 13 strokes. He won a record eighteen tournaments in 1945, including eleven consecutive.

Sixteen years later, the tour returned to Seattle in 1961 at Broadmoor in mid-September with the Greater Seattle Open Invitational. Dave Marr won in a sudden-death playoff, over Bob Rosburg and Jacky Cupit; Marr shot a final round 63 (–7) and birdied the first extra hole to win. In 1962, it was renamed the Seattle World's Fair Open Invitational as part of the region's celebration of the 1962 Seattle World's Fair. The victor by two strokes was a 22-year-old rookie from Ohio named Jack Nicklaus. It was his second tour win and first non-major, following a playoff victory over Arnold Palmer in June at the U.S. Open at Oakmont. Nicklaus had won $50,000 in the exhibition World Series of Golf the week before, and won in Portland the following week for his third tour title.

The last event in 1966, the Greater Seattle-Everett Classic, was held at the Everett Golf & Country Club. It was won by Homero Blancas, one stroke ahead of Cupit, a two-time runner-up.

Inglewood later hosted the GTE Northwest Classic on the Senior PGA Tour, from 1987 through 1995.

== Venues ==
Years	Course	Par	Location	Coordinates
1966	Everett Golf & Country Club	71	Everett	47.947°N 122.21°W
1936, (Note: Par 73 in 1936.) 1963, 1965	Inglewood Golf Club	72	Kenmore	47.75°N 122.255°W
1945, 1961, 1962, 1964	Broadmoor Golf Club	70	Seattle	47.64°N 122.292°W

== Winners ==
Year	Winner	Score	To par	Margin of victory	Runner(s)-up	Purse (US$)	Winner's share ($)	Ref.
Greater Seattle-Everett Classic
1966	(United States) Homero Blancas	266	−18	1 stroke	(United States) Jacky Cupit	50,000	6,600	
Greater Seattle Open Invitational
1965	(United States) Gay Brewer	279	−9	Playoff	(United States) Doug Sanders	45,000	6,600	
1964	(United States) Billy Casper	265	−15	2 strokes	(United States) Mason Rudolph	40,000	5,800	
Seattle Open Invitational
1963	(United States) Bobby Nichols	272	−16	2 strokes	(United States) Raymond Floyd (Canada) Stan Leonard	35,000	5,300	
Seattle World's Fair Open Invitational
1962	(United States) Jack Nicklaus	265	−15	2 strokes	(United States) Tony Lema	30,000	4,300	
Greater Seattle Open Invitational
1961	(United States) Dave Marr	265	−15	Playoff	(United States) Jacky Cupit (United States) Bob Rosburg	25,000	3,500	
Seattle Open
1946–1960: No tournament
1945	(United States) Byron Nelson	259	−21	13 strokes	(United States) Harry Givan (a) (United States) Jug McSpaden	10,250	2,000	
1937–1944: No tournament
1936	(Scotland) Macdonald Smith	285	−7	Playoff	(United States) Ralph Guldahl	5,000	1,200	

== Playoffs ==
- 1936: 18-hole playoff, Smith 65 (–8), Guldahl 71 (–2).
- 1961: Marr sank a 3-foot (0.9 m) birdie putt on the first playoff hole, a par-5, for the win.
- 1965: Brewer had a tap-in par on the first playoff hole, a par-4, and Sanders bogeyed.
