= A. V. Macan =

Irish-Canadian lawyer, amateur golfer, and golf course architect

A.V. Macan
- Born: 1882; Dublin, Ireland
- Died: August 1964 (aged 82); Sequim, Washington, U.S.
- Education: Trinity College Dublin
- Occupations: Attorney, Golf course architect
- Known for: golf course design
- Spouse: Juliet Adelaide Richards Macan
- Children: 2
- Parent(s): A.V. Macan, Sr. (1843–1908); Mary A. Wanklyn Macan (18xx–1886)
- Military career
- Allegiance: Canada
- Branch: Canadian Army, (CEF)
- Service years: 1916–1918
- Rank: Lieutenant
- Conflicts: World War I: Battle of Vimy Ridge

Arthur Vernon Macan Jr. (1882–1964) was an Irish immigrant to Canada who designed golf courses in western North America, primarily in British Columbia and the Pacific Northwest. He won the Pacific Northwest Amateur in 1913.

A lawyer by trade, Macan was born in Ireland, the son of Dr. A.V. Macan (1843–1908), a noted physician who was knighted.

== Early years ==
Macan's mother died in 1886 when he was four; he was raised in Dublin. He attended the Shrewsbury School in England and Trinity College Dublin. Introduced to golf around age nine, he became one of the top players in Ireland, and quickly tired of the legal profession. He moved his family to western Canada and settled in British Columbia at Victoria in 1912.

== World War I ==
In his early 30s, he volunteered for service in World War I in 1916 as an officer in the Canadian Expeditionary Force of the Canadian Army, and was wounded by a shell casing fragment in 1917 at the Battle of Vimy Ridge in France. Blood poisoning in his left foot resulted in the amputation of his lower left leg. After the war, he returned to Canada and continued to play competitive golf and design courses.

== Courses designed ==
=== Canada ===
==== British Columbia ====
Qualicum (1913), Royal Colwood (1913; 1921–1922 renovation), Cowichan (1922), Marine Drive (1923), Gleneagles (1927), Gorge Vale (1920 & 1930), Langara Golf Course (1926), old Shaughnessy Heights (1927; 1940 renovation), Stanley Park Par-3 (1927), University (1927), Victoria (1930 & 1955 renovations), Cowichan (1947), Kelowna (1949 & 1959 renovations), Nanaimo (1953 & 1961), McCleery (1956), Richmond (1959), new Shaughnessy (1959), Capilano (1960 renovation), Penticton (1961 renovation), and Queen Elizabeth Park (1961).

=== United States ===
==== Washington ====
Inglewood (1920, 1928 renovation), Chehalis (1922), Manito (1922), Waverly (1922 – 1950s renovation), Rainier (1923 – front nine), Glen Acres (1924), Fircrest (1924), Broadmoor (1925), Seattle (1950 renovation), Overlake (1953), Sun Willows (1954), Yakima (1956 back nine), Everett (1962 renovation), Lake Spanaway Municipal (1964), and Sunland (1964).

==== Oregon ====
Columbia-Edgewater (1924), Alderwood (1924; 1949 renovation), Astoria (1924), Illahe Hills (1928), Colwood National (1928), Lloyds (1930), Gearhart (1932 renovation)

=== Idaho ===
Hillcrest (1940; 1957 & 1961 renovations), Purple Sage Municipal (1963)

=== California ===
California Golf Club (1925), Contra Costa (1925), San Geronimo (1961)

== Death ==
Macan died at age 82 in August 1964 on the Olympic Peninsula in Sequim, Washington; he had a fatal heart attack while working on site of what was to become the Sunland Golf Club.

== Honours ==
Macan was inducted into the Canadian Golf Hall of Fame in 2018.
