= Rose City Golf Course =

Golf course in Portland, Oregon, U.S.

- Interactive map of Rose City Golf Course
- 45.54°N 122.59°W

Club information
- Location: Portland, Oregon, United States

Rose City Golf Course is a golf course is located in northeast Portland, Oregon. It opened in 1923.

Mayor Ted Wheeler had considered the site for a Major League Baseball stadium.

The Rose City Golf Clubhouse is listed on the National Register of Historic Places.

== See also ==
- List of sports venues in Portland, Oregon
