= Concordia Cavaliers =

- University: Concordia University
- Location: Portland, Oregon
- Varsity teams: 15
- Basketball arena: LCEF Court
- Baseball stadium: Porter Park at Hilken Community Stadium
- Soccer stadium: Tuominen Yard at Hilken Community Stadium
- Mascot: Luther the Lion
- Nickname: Cavaliers
- Colors: Blue and white
- Website: www.gocugo.com

The Concordia Cavaliers were the athletic teams that represented Concordia University, located in Portland, Oregon, in intercollegiate sports as a member of the Division II level of the National Collegiate Athletic Association (NCAA), primarily competing in the Great Northwest Athletic Conference (GNAC) from 2015–16 to 2019–20. The Cavaliers previously competed in the Cascade Collegiate Conference (CCC) of the National Association of Intercollegiate Athletics (NAIA) from 1993–94 to 2014–15. The official school colors were navy and white.

== Varsity teams ==
Concordia competed in 15 intercollegiate varsity sports: Men's sports included baseball, basketball, cross country, golf, soccer and track & field (indoor and outdoor); while women's sports included basketball, cross country, golf, soccer, softball, track & field (indoor and outdoor) and volleyball.

== History ==
Concordia joined NCAA Division II and the Great Northwest Athletic Conference (GNAC) in 2015 as a provisional member (later for full member status in 2017), after years in the Cascade Collegiate Conference (CCC) and being in the National Association of Intercollegiate Athletics (NAIA). The Cavaliers won two national championships in NAIA, winning in 2013 for women's soccer and in 2011 for women's track & field. In addition, the Cavaliers won numerous conference championships in various sports, winning 20 in women's soccer, with eleven tournament titles and 17 regular season titles.

== Facilities ==
Built in 2011, Hilken Community Stadium was the home facility for Concordia University's baseball, softball, and soccer teams.

LCEF Court hosted volleyball and basketball.

The Concordia University Throw Center has circles, cages, and runways for all four throwing events (javelin, discus, hammer, and shot put), and can all host up to 40 participants per event.

== National Championships ==
Concordia University, Portland is credited with 2 official team National Championships.

Association	Division	Sport	Year
NAIA	Division I		
NAIA	Division I	Women's Track and Field	2011
NAIA	Division I		
NAIA	Division I	Women's Soccer	2013
