= Portland Golf Club =

Golf club in Oregon, US

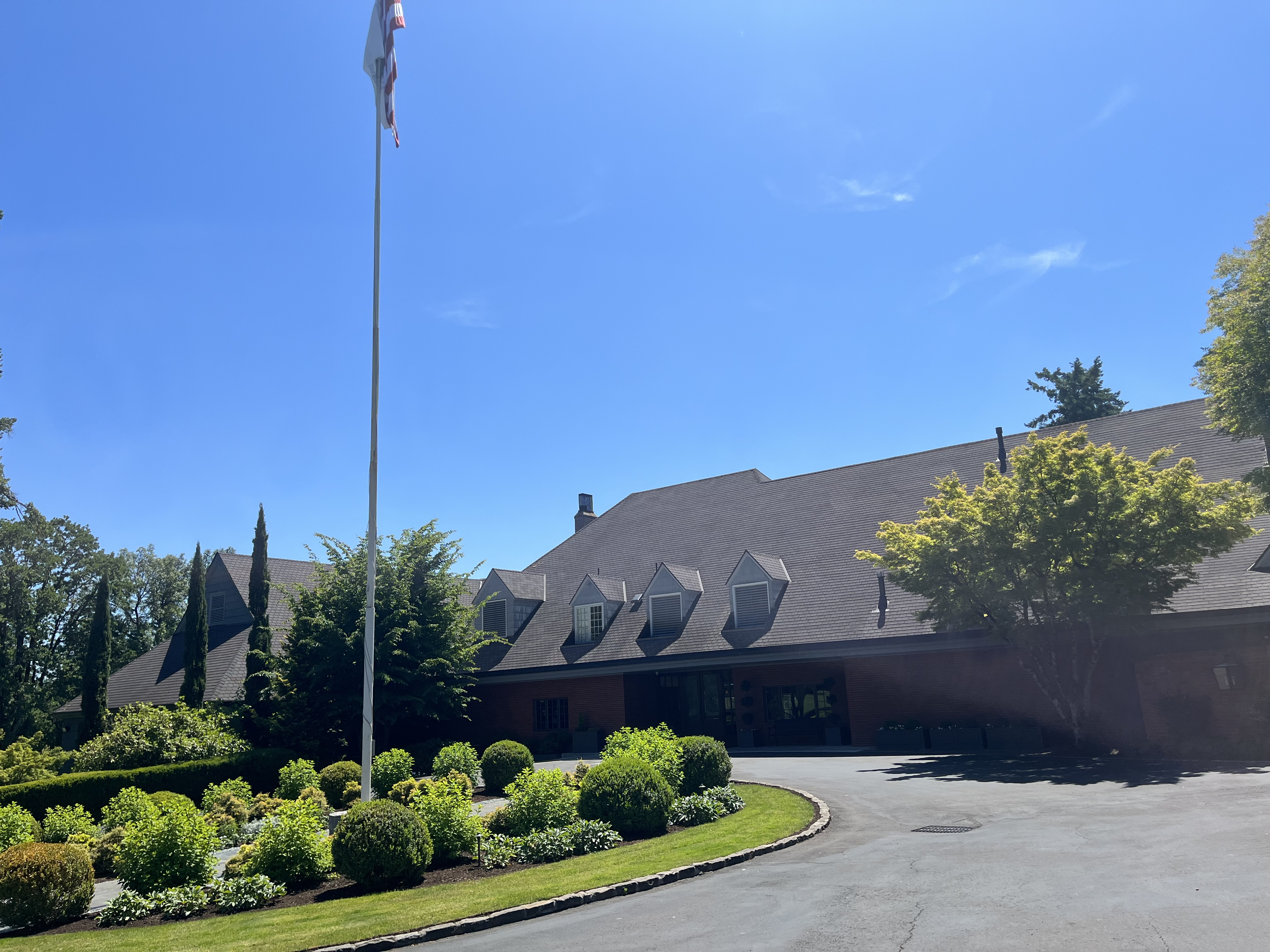

- Location within the United States Location within Oregon
- 45.4773°N 122.7627°W

Club information
- Location: Raleigh Hills, Oregon, U.S.
- Elevation: 230 feet (70 m)
- Established: 1914; 112 years ago
- Type: Private
- Total holes: 18
- Tournaments: 1946 PGA Championship; 1947 Ryder Cup; Portland Open; Portland Classic
- Greens: Bentgrass
- Fairways: Winter Ryegrass
- Website: www.portlandgolfclub.com
- Designed by: George Turnbull, Robert Trent Jones, Tom Bendelow
- Par: 72
- Length: 6,703 yards (6,129 m)
- Course rating: 72.8
- Slope rating: 144
- Portland Golf Club Clubhouse and Golf Course
- U.S. National Register of Historic Places
- Location: Portland, Oregon
- NRHP reference No.: 100007088
- Added to NRHP: February 24, 2023

The Portland Golf Club is a private golf club in the northwest United States, in suburban Portland, Oregon. It is located in the unincorporated Raleigh Hills area of eastern Washington County, southwest of downtown Portland and east of Beaverton.

PGC was established 112 years ago in the winter of 1914, when a group of nine businessmen assembled to form a new club after leaving their respective clubs. The present site was chosen due to its relation to the Spokane, Portland and Seattle Railway's interurban railroad line with frequent passenger service to the site because automobiles and roads were few.

The PGA Championship, then a match play competition, was held at the club in 1946, which was won by Ben Hogan. The property was listed on the National Register of Historic Places, as the Portland Golf Club Clubhouse and Golf Course, in 2023.

== Tournaments hosted ==
Tournament	Years
PGA Tour
Portland Open Invitational	1944–45; 1947–48; 1959–60; 1964–65
**PGA Championship**	1946
Ryder Cup	1947
Western Open	1955
Alcan Golfer of the Year Championship	1969
Fred Meyer Challenge	1986–91
LPGA Tour
**Women's Western Open**	1934
Portland Classic	1972–73; 1975–76
Portland PING Team Championship	1979
Senior PGA Tour
**U.S. Senior Open**	1982
Amateur
Western Amateur	1931
U.S. Senior Amateur	1999
U.S. Women's Amateur	2015

Major championships for all tours are shown in bold.

== See also ==
- List of sports venues in Portland, Oregon
- National Register of Historic Places listings in Washington County, Oregon
