= 1946 PGA Championship =

Coordinates: 45.477°N 122.763°W

Tournament information
- Dates: August 19–25, 1946
- Location: Portland, Oregon, U.S.
- Course: Portland Golf Club
- Organized by: PGA of America
- Tour: PGA Tour
- Format: Match play - 6 rounds

Statistics
- Par: 72
- Length: 6,524 yards (5,966 m)
- Field: 122 players, 64 to match play
- Cut: 148 (+4), playoff
- Prize fund: $17,700
- Winner's share: $3,500

Champion
- (United States) Ben Hogan
- def. Ed Oliver, 6 and 4

Location in the United States
Location in Oregon

The 1946 PGA Championship was the 28th PGA Championship, held August 19–25 at Portland Golf Club outside Portland, Oregon. Ben Hogan won the match play championship, 6 and 4 over Ed Oliver in the final; the winner's share was $3,500 and the runner-up's was $1,500.

Hogan was three down after the first 18 holes in the morning, then rebounded in the afternoon. In the semifinals, Hogan defeated Jimmy Demaret 10 and 9 and Oliver beat Jug McSpaden 6 and 5. Oliver defeated defending champion Byron Nelson 1 up in the quarterfinals.

For Hogan, age 34, it was the first of his nine major titles. He won again in 1948, but following his near-fatal auto accident in early 1949, his debilitated condition did not agree with the grueling five-day schedule of 36 holes per day in summer heat. Hogan did not enter the PGA Championship again until 1960, its third year as a 72-hole stroke play event, at 18 holes per day.

In the quarterfinals, defending champion Byron Nelson bogeyed the final hole and lost 1 down to Oliver; it was Nelson's final appearance at the PGA Championship. The medalist for the stroke-play qualifying portion was Jim Ferrier, which included a 29 on the front nine of the second round, a record for a PGA event. He won the PGA Championship title the following year in 1947.

The Portland Golf Club hosted the Portland Open on the PGA Tour the previous two years; Sam Snead won in 1944 and Hogan in 1945. It also hosted the Ryder Cup in 1947, won by the U.S. team captained by Hogan.

This was the first "full field" at the PGA Championship since 1941, with a match play bracket of 64 competitors. Due to World War II, it had been reduced to 32 for 1942, 1944, and 1945, and not played in 1943.

Hogan's win marked the first time that all four major championships were won by Americans in a calendar year.

== Format ==
The match play format at the PGA Championship in 1946 called for 12 rounds (216 holes) in seven days:

- Monday and Tuesday – 36-hole stroke play qualifier, 18 holes per day;
  - defending champion Byron Nelson and top 63 professionals advanced to match play
- Wednesday – first two rounds, 18 holes each
- Thursday – third round – 36 holes
- Friday – quarterfinals – 36 holes
- Saturday – semifinals – 36 holes
- Sunday – final – 36 holes

== Final results ==
Sunday, August 25, 1946

Place	Player	Money ($)
1	(United States) Ben Hogan	3,500
2	(United States) Ed Oliver	1,500
T3	(United States) Jimmy Demaret	750
T3	(United States) Jug McSpaden	750
T5	(United States) Chuck Congdon	500
T5	(United States) Frank Moore	500
T5	(United States) Byron Nelson	500
T5	(United States) Jim Turnesa	500

== Final eight bracket ==
Quarter-finals; August 23
Ben Hogan	5&4
Frank Moore
Jimmy Demaret	6&5
Jim Turnesa
Ed Oliver	1up
Byron Nelson
Jug McSpaden	5&3
Chuck Congdon

Semi-finals; August 24
Ben Hogan	10&9
Jimmy Demaret
Ed Oliver	6&5
Jug McSpaden

Finals; August 25
Ben Hogan	6&4
Ed Oliver

== Final match scorecards ==
Morning

Hole	1	2	3	4	5	6	7	8	9	10	11	12	13	14	15	16	17	18
Par	4	4	4	3	5	4	4	3	4	5	4	3	4	4	5	4	3	5
(United States) Hogan	4	5	4	3	4	5	4	3	4	5	5	3	4	4	4	4	3	5
(United States) Oliver	5	4	4	3	4	4	4	3	4	5	4	4	4	5	3	3	2	5
Leader	H1	–	–	–	–	O1	O1	O1	O1	O1	O2	O1	O1	–	O1	O2	O3	O3

Afternoon

Hole	1	2	3	4	5	6	7	8	9	10	11	12	13	14	15	16	17	18
Par	4	4	4	3	5	4	4	3	4	5	4	3	4	4	5	4	3	5
(United States) Hogan	4	4	3	2	4	3	4	3	3	4	3	3	4	3	Hogan wins 6 and 4			
(United States) Oliver	4	5	4	3	5	3	4	3	5	5	4	4	4	4	Hogan wins 6 and 4			
Leader	O3	O2	O1	–	H1	H1	H1	H1	H2	H3	H4	H5	H5	H6	Hogan wins 6 and 4			

Eagle	Birdie	Bogey
