= 1947 Ryder Cup =

Golf tournament in the United States

7th Ryder Cup Matches
- Dates: November 1–2, 1947
- Venue: Portland Golf Club
- Location: Portland, Oregon
- Captains: Ben Hogan (USA); Henry Cotton (Great Britain)
(United States)	11	1	(United Kingdom)
- United States wins the Ryder Cup

Location map
- Location within Oregon

The 7th Ryder Cup Matches were held November 1–2, 1947 at Portland Golf Club in Portland, Oregon, marking a resumption of the competition after a full decade. World War II forced cancellations from 1939 to 1945; the last competition was in 1937. The United States overwhelmed the British team, 11–1.

An invitation to renew the Ryder Cup was sent by the American P.G.A. in November 1946, which was accepted by the British P.G.A. the next month. However, it was not until August 1947 that the dates and venue were agreed.

The revival of the Ryder Cup in 1947 was initiated by Portland businessman Robert A. Hudson, who paid for the expenses of the teams and chaired the event. He even met the British team in New York City, threw a lavish party at the Waldorf Astoria hotel, and accompanied them on the four-day rail journey across the U.S. to Portland.

The course had hosted the stroke play Portland Open on the PGA Tour in 1944 and 1945, won by Sam Snead and Ben Hogan, and the match play PGA Championship in August 1946, won by Hogan.

The American team won all four matches on the opening day and continued to dominate by winning all but one singles match. The only British victory in the competition came when Sam King beat Herman Keiser 4 & 3.

Played in the Pacific Northwest in November in wind and rain, soft course conditions prevailed as a week-long rain preceded the event. The next several matches in the U.S. were played in more southerly venues.

== Format ==
The Ryder Cup is a match play event, with each match worth one point. From 1927 through 1959, the format consisted of 4 foursome (alternate shot) matches on the first day and 8 singles matches on the second day, for a total of 12 points. Therefore, 6 1/2 points were required to win the Cup. All matches were played to a maximum of 36 holes.

== Teams ==
This was the first of only two Ryder Cups for Hogan as a player and the second and final appearance for Byron Nelson, later the non-playing captain in 1965. Hogan was to be a non-playing captain in 1949 and 1967.

Team USA
Name	Age	Previous Ryder Cups	Matches	W–L–H	Winning percentage
Ben Hogan – captain	35	0	Rookie
Herman Barron	37	0	Rookie
Jimmy Demaret	37	0	Rookie
Dutch Harrison	37	0	Rookie
Herman Keiser	33	0	Rookie
Lloyd Mangrum	33	0	Rookie
Byron Nelson	35	1	2	1–1–0	50.00
Ed Oliver	32	0	Rookie
Sam Snead	35	1	1	1–0–0	100.00
Lew Worsham	30	0	Rookie

In January 1947 the British P.G.A. appointed a selection committee of five. This committee included three ex-Ryder Cup players: Bill Davies, George Duncan and Charles Whitcombe. In early August they announced a list of 14 players from which the final 10 would be chosen. The winner of the News of the World Match Play would also be included in the list. In early September they announced the first seven members of the team: Cotton (captain), Daly, Rees, King, Adams, Ward and Horne. They also added two new names to the list of possible players (Arthur Lees and Laurie Ayton, Jnr), leaving nine or ten players competing for the remaining three places. Later in September two more players were selected: Green and Lees, to which would be added the winner of the Match Play Championship or Max Faulkner if the winner of that tournament should already be in the team or ineligible. The final place fell to Faulkner on September 26 when three of the semi-finalists in the Match Play Championship were already in the team and the fourth (Flory Van Donck, a Belgian) was ineligible.

The British team was accompanied by Commander R.C.T. Roe, Secretary of the British P.G.A., who acted as manager of the team. They left from Southampton for New York on the Queen Mary on October 18.

Team Great Britain
Name	Age	Previous Ryder Cups	Matches	W–L–H	Winning percentage
(England) Henry Cotton – captain	40	2	4	2–2–0	50.00
(Scotland) Jimmy Adams	37	0	Rookie
(Northern Ireland) Fred Daly	36	0	Rookie
(England) Max Faulkner	31	0	Rookie
(England) Eric Green	39	0	Rookie
(England) Reg Horne	39	0	Rookie
(England) Sam King	36	1	1	0–0–1	50.00
(England) Arthur Lees	39	0	Rookie
(Wales) Dai Rees	34	1	2	1–0–1	75.00
(England) Charlie Ward	36	0	Rookie

== Saturday's foursome matches ==
	Results
Cotton/Lees	(United States) 10 & 9	Oliver/Worsham
Daly/Ward	(United States) 6 & 5	Snead/Mangrum
Adams/Faulkner	(United States) 2 up	Hogan/Demaret
Rees/King	(United States) 2 & 1	Nelson/Barron
0	Session	4
0	Overall	4

18 hole scores: Oliver/Worsham: 6 up, Snead/Mangrum: 6 up, Adams/Faulkner: 2 up, Rees/King: 1 up.

== Sunday's singles matches ==
	Results
Fred Daly	(United States) 5 & 4	Dutch Harrison
Jimmy Adams	(United States) 3 & 2	Lew Worsham
Max Faulkner	(United States) 6 & 5	Lloyd Mangrum
Charlie Ward	(United States) 4 & 3	Ed Oliver
Arthur Lees	(United States) 2 & 1	Byron Nelson
Henry Cotton	(United States) 5 & 4	Sam Snead
Dai Rees	(United States) 3 & 2	Jimmy Demaret
Sam King	(United Kingdom) 4 & 3	Herman Keiser
1	Session	7
1	Overall	11

== Individual player records ==
Each entry refers to the win–loss–half record of the player.

=== United States ===
Player	Points	Overall	Singles	Foursomes
Herman Barron	1	1–0–0	0–0–0	1–0–0
Jimmy Demaret	2	2–0–0	1–0–0	1–0–0
Dutch Harrison	1	1–0–0	1–0–0	0–0–0
Ben Hogan	1	1–0–0	0–0–0	1–0–0
Herman Keiser	0	0–1–0	0–1–0	0–0–0
Lloyd Mangrum	2	2–0–0	1–0–0	1–0–0
Byron Nelson	2	2–0–0	1–0–0	1–0–0
Ed Oliver	2	2–0–0	1–0–0	1–0–0
Sam Snead	2	2–0–0	1–0–0	1–0–0
Lew Worsham	2	2–0–0	1–0–0	1–0–0

=== Great Britain ===
Player	Points	Overall	Singles	Foursomes
Jimmy Adams	0	0–2–0	0–1–0	0–1–0
Henry Cotton	0	0–2–0	0–1–0	0–1–0
Fred Daly	0	0–2–0	0–1–0	0–1–0
Max Faulkner	0	0–2–0	0–1–0	0–1–0
Sam King	1	1–1–0	1–0–0	0–1–0
Arthur Lees	0	0–2–0	0–1–0	0–1–0
Dai Rees	0	0–2–0	0–1–0	0–1–0
Charlie Ward	0	0–2–0	0–1–0	0–1–0

Eric Green and Reg Horne did not play in any matches.
