= Portland Classic =

Golf tournament

Coordinates: 45.599°N 122.643°W

The Standard Portland Classic

Tournament information
- Location: Portland, Oregon, U.S.
- Established: 1972
- Course: Columbia Edgewater Country Club
- Par: 72
- Length: 6,541 yards (5,981 m) (in 2026)
- Tour: LPGA Tour
- Format: Stroke play – 72 holes
- Prize fund: $2.0 million
- Month played: August/September

Tournament record score
- Aggregate: 199 Annika Sörenstam (2002) - 54 holes 262 Chanettee Wannasaen (2023) - 72 holes
- To par: −17 Annika Sörenstam (2002) - 54 holes −26 Chanettee Wannasaen (2023) - 72 holes

Current champion
- (Thailand) Jeeno Thitikul

Location in the United States
Location in Oregon

The Standard Portland Classic is a women's professional golf tournament in Oregon on the LPGA Tour. Founded 54 years ago in 1972, the annual event in the Portland area is the oldest continuous event on the LPGA Tour. Tournament Golf Foundation has owned the tournament since its beginning and also managed the Safeway International tournament on the LPGA Tour. It became a 72-hole event in 2013, after decades at 54 holes.

Proceeds from the tournament are donated to local children's charities; over $19 million has been donated since 1972. The tournament has had a variety of sponsors during its history.

== Tournament names ==
- 1972: Portland Ladies Classic
- 1973: Portland Ladies Open
- 1974–1975: Portland Ladies Classic
- 1976: Portland Classic
- 1977: LPGA National Team Championship
- 1978: Ping Classic Team Championship
- 1979–1982: Portland Ping Team Championship
- 1983–1985: Portland Ping Championship
- 1986–1989: Cellular One-Ping Golf Championship
- 1990: Ping-Cellular One Golf Championship
- 1991–1994: Ping-Cellular One LPGA Golf Championship
- 1995: Ping-AT&T Wireless Services LPGA Golf Championship
- 1996–2000: Safeway LPGA Golf Championship
- 2001–2002: Safeway Classic
- 2003–2008: Safeway Classic Presented by Pepsi
- 2009–2013: Safeway Classic Presented by Coca-Cola
- 2014: Portland Classic Presented by Cambia Health Solutions
- 2015: Cambia Portland Classic
- 2016–2017: Cambia Portland Classic Presented by JTBC
- 2018–2021: Cambia Portland Classic
- 2022: AmazingCre Portland Classic
- 2023–2024: Portland Classic
- 2025–present: The Standard Portland Classic

== History ==
The event began as the Portland Ladies Classic in 1972, played at the Portland Golf Club (PGC) in Raleigh Hills for its first two editions. It moved to the Columbia Edgewater Country Club, west of the airport, then returned to PGC in 1975. From 1977 to 1982, the tournament was a team event and its prize money was unofficial. It returned to Columbia Edgewater in 1977, then went to the adjacent Riverside Golf & Country Club in 1980. The three courses rotated as hosts for the tournament until 1990, when Columbia Edgewater became the site for the next 18 editions. In 1978, Ping became a title sponsor. From 1986 to 1995, Cellular One and AT&T Wireless Services also were title sponsors, and in 1996 Safeway took over as the sole title sponsor. The event was moved up on the schedule in 2005, from September to August, and the purse reached $1.7 million in 2007.

In 2009, the tournament moved to the Pumpkin Ridge Golf Club near North Plains, and drew a tournament record crowd of 87,800 at the Ghost Creek Course. In 2009 and 2010, the course par was increased to 72 for the tournament, as the ninth hole was modified to a par-5; the result was three consecutive reachable par-5's (8,9, & 10) which slowed the pace of play. In 2011, the eighth hole was lengthened and the ninth was returned to a par-4, resulting in a par-71 course (same as public play). The ninth hole was returned to a par-5 in 2012 for a par-72 layout.

In 2013, the tournament moved back to the Columbia Edgewater in Portland and expanded to 72 holes, with a reduced purse of $1.3 million. Safeway dropped its sponsorship after 2013, and Portland-based Cambia Health Solutions became the presenting sponsor.

In 2015, 17-year-old Brooke Henderson Monday-qualified and won the event by eight shots, the largest victory margin on tour since 2012, and became the tour's third-youngest winner. She was only the second Monday qualifier to win on tour and the first in fifteen years, since Laurel Kean in 2000. Henderson was also the first Canadian to win on the LPGA Tour in fourteen years, since Lorie Kane in 2001, and was granted immediate tour membership.

In 2017, Stacy Lewis, a native of Houston, Texas pledged her winnings to relief efforts for Hurricane Harvey pre-tournament. Lewis went on to win the event donating her entire $195,000 purse to hurricane relief efforts.

The 2020 tournament was reduced to 54-holes due to poor air quality caused by wildfires.

The 2021 tournament moved to Oregon Golf Club in West Linn, Oregon. It was reduced to 54 holes due to rain and course conditions.

In 2022, the tournament moved back to Columbia Edgewater Country Club

== Venues ==
As of the 2024 tournament, the Classic has been held at 5 different venues:

- Portland Golf Club 1972–1973, 1975–1976, 1979
- Columbia Edgewater Country Club 1974, 1977–1978, 1982–1983, 1986–1988, 1990–2008, 2013–2020, 2022–2024
- Riverside Golf & Country Club 1980–1981, 1984–1985, 1989
- Pumpkin Ridge Golf Club (Ghost Creek Course) 2009–2012
- Oregon Golf Club 2021

== Winners ==
Year	Date	Champion	Winning score	To par	Margin of victory	Venue	Purse ($)	Winner's share ($)
2026	Aug 16	(Thailand) Jeeno Thitikul	266	−22	1 stroke	Columbia Edgewater CC	2,000,000	300,000
2025	Aug 17	(Japan) Akie Iwai	264	−24	4 strokes	Columbia Edgewater CC	2,000,000	300,000
2024	Aug 4	(Thailand) Moriya Jutanugarn	266	−22	2 strokes	Columbia Edgewater CC	1,750,000	262,500
2023	Sep 3	(Thailand) Chanettee Wannasaen	262	−26	4 strokes	Columbia Edgewater CC	1,500,000	225,000
2022	Sep 18	(United States) Andrea Lee	269	−19	1 stroke	Columbia Edgewater C.C	1,500,000	225,000
2021	Sep 19	(South Korea) Ko Jin-young	205^	−11	4 strokes	Oregon Golf Club	1,400,000	210,000
2020	Sep 20	(England) Georgia Hall	204^	−12	Playoff	Columbia Edgewater CC	1,750,000	262,500
2019	Sep 1	(Australia) Hannah Green	267	−21	1 stroke	Columbia Edgewater CC	1,300,000	195,000
2018	Sep 2	(United States) Marina Alex	269	−19	4 strokes	Columbia Edgewater CC	1,300,000	195,000
2017	Sep 3	(United States) Stacy Lewis	268	−20	1 stroke	Columbia Edgewater CC	1,300,000	195,000
2016	Jul 3	(Canada) Brooke Henderson (2)	274	−14	4 strokes	Columbia Edgewater CC	1,300,000	195,000
2015	Aug 16	(Canada) Brooke Henderson	267	−21	8 strokes	Columbia Edgewater CC	1,300,000	195,000
2014	Aug 31	(United States) Austin Ernst	274	−14	Playoff	Columbia Edgewater CC	1,300,000	195,000
2013	Sep 1	(Norway) Suzann Pettersen (2)	268	−20	2 strokes	Columbia Edgewater CC	1,300,000	195,000
2012	Aug 19	(Japan) Mika Miyazato	203	−13	2 strokes	Pumpkin Ridge GC (Ghost Cr.)	1,500,000	225,000
2011	Aug 21	(Norway) Suzann Pettersen	207	−6	Playoff	Pumpkin Ridge GC (Ghost Cr.)	1,500,000	225,000
2010	Aug 22	(Japan) Ai Miyazato	205	−11	2 strokes	Pumpkin Ridge GC (Ghost Cr.)	1,500,000	225,000
2009	Aug 30	(South Korea) M. J. Hur	203	−13	Playoff	Pumpkin Ridge GC (Ghost Cr.)	1,700,000	255,000
2008	Aug 24	(United States) Cristie Kerr	203	−13	Playoff	Columbia Edgewater CC	1,700,000	255,000
2007	Aug 26	(Mexico) Lorena Ochoa	204	−12	5 strokes	Columbia Edgewater CC	1,700,000	255,000
2006	Aug 20	(United States) Pat Hurst	206	−10	1 stroke	Columbia Edgewater CC	1,400,000	210,000
2005	Aug 21	(South Korea) Kang Soo-yun	201	−15	4 strokes	Columbia Edgewater CC	1,400,000	210,000
2004	Sep 19	(South Korea) Hee-Won Han	207	−9	Playoff	Columbia Edgewater CC	1,200,000	180,000
2003	Sep 28	(Sweden) Annika Sörenstam (2)	201	−15	1 stroke	Columbia Edgewater CC	1,200,000	180,000
2002	Sep 15	(Sweden) Annika Sörenstam	199	−17	1 stroke	Columbia Edgewater CC	1,000,000	150,000
2001	Tournament canceled because of the September 11 attacks							
2000	Sep 24	(South Korea) Mi Hyun Kim	215	−1	Playoff	Columbia Edgewater CC	800,000	120,000
1999	Sep 26	(United States) Juli Inkster	207	−9	6 strokes	Columbia Edgewater CC	800,000	120,000
1998	Sep 6	(United States) Danielle Ammaccapane	204	−12	1 stroke	Columbia Edgewater CC	600,000	90,000
1997	Sep 7	(United States) Christa Johnson	206	−10	1 stroke	Columbia Edgewater CC	550,000	82,500
1996	Sep 8	(United States) Dottie Pepper	202	−14	2 strokes	Columbia Edgewater CC	550,000	82,500
1995	Sep 10	(England) Alison Nicholas	207	−9	1 stroke	Columbia Edgewater CC	500,000	75,000
1994	Sep 11	(United States) Missie McGeorge	207	−9	1 stroke	Columbia Edgewater CC	500,000	75,000
1993	Sep 12	(United States) Donna Andrews	208	−8	1 stroke	Columbia Edgewater CC	450,000	67,500
1992	Sep 13	(United States) Nancy Lopez (3)	209	−7	Playoff	Columbia Edgewater CC	450,000	67,500
1991	Sep 8	(United States) Michelle Estill	208	−8	1 stroke	Columbia Edgewater CC	400,000	60,000
1990	Sep 9	(United States) Patty Sheehan	208	−8	1 stroke	Columbia Edgewater CC	350,000	52,500
1989	Sep 10	(United States) Muffin Spencer-Devlin	214	−2	1 stroke	Riverside G&CC	300,000	45,000
1988	Sep 11	(United States) Betsy King	213	−3	1 stroke	Riverside G&CC	250,000	37,500
1987	Sep 13	(United States) Nancy Lopez (2)	210	−6	1 stroke	Columbia Edgewater CC	225,000	33,750
1986	Sep 7	(Japan) Ayako Okamoto	207	−9	6 strokes	Columbia Edgewater CC	200,000	30,000
1985	Sep 8	(United States) Nancy Lopez	215	−1	Playoff	Riverside G&CC	175,000	26,250
1984	Sep 9	(United States) Amy Alcott	212	−4	1 stroke	Riverside G&CC	150,000	22,500
1983	Sep 11	(United States) JoAnne Carner	212	−4	Playoff	Columbia Edgewater CC	150,000	22,500
Tournament played from 1977 through 1982 as unofficial team event
1982	Sep 19	(United States) Sandra Haynie & (United States) Kathy McMullen	196	−20	2 strokes	Columbia Edgewater CC	120,000	21,600
1981	Oct 4	(United States) Donna Caponi & (United States) Kathy Whitworth	203	−16	Playoff	Riverside G&CC	120,000	21,000
1980	Oct 5	(United States) Donna Caponi & (United States) Kathy Whitworth	195	−24	4 strokes	Riverside G&CC	115,000	21,000
1979	Sep 16	(United States) Nancy Lopez & (United States) Jo Ann Washam	198	−21	1 stroke	Portland Golf Club	110,000	20,000
1978	Sep 24	(United States) Donna Caponi & (United States) Kathy Whitworth	203	−16	Playoff	Columbia Edgewater CC	100,000	20,000
1977	Sep 18	(United States) JoAnne Carner & (United States) Judy Rankin	202	−17	Playoff	Columbia Edgewater CC	60,000	9,000
1976	Sep 19	(United States) Donna Caponi	217	−2	Playoff	Portland Golf Club	45,000	6,400
1975	Sep 21	(United States) Jo Ann Washam	215	−1	1 stroke	Portland Golf Club	40,000	5,700
1974	Sep 29	(United States) JoAnne Carner	211	−5	2 strokes	Columbia Edgewater CC	35,000	5,000
1973	Sep 23	(United States) Kathy Whitworth	144^	−2	2 strokes	Portland Golf Club	30,000	4,500
1972	Oct 1	(United States) Kathy Whitworth	212	−7	4 strokes	Portland Golf Club	30,000	3,750

^ rain-shortened tournament
Note: Green highlight indicates scoring records.

== Tournament record ==
Year	Player	Score	To par	Round	Course
2002	Annika Sörenstam	62	−10	2nd	Columbia Edgewater Country Club
2003	Beth Daniel	62	−10	1st	Columbia Edgewater Country Club
2009	Beth Bader	64	−8	1st	Pumpkin Ridge Golf Club, Ghost Creek Course
2010	Oh Ji-young	64	−8	2nd	Pumpkin Ridge Golf Club, Ghost Creek Course
2010	Song-Hee Kim	64	−8	2nd	Pumpkin Ridge Golf Club, Ghost Creek Course
2011	Suzann Pettersen	64	−7	3rd	Pumpkin Ridge Golf Club, Ghost Creek Course
2019	Kim Sei-young	61	−11	2nd	Columbia Edgewater Country Club

== See also ==
- WinCo Foods Portland Open, a current event on the Korn Ferry Tour
- Portland Open Invitational, a former event on the PGA Tour
