= Nike Grind =

- Product type: Recycled materials
- Current owner: Nike
- Country: United States
- Introduced: 1994; 32 years ago
- Website: nikegrind.com

Nike Grind is Nike's collection of recycled materials that is composed of pre-consumer manufacturing scraps, recycled post-consumer shoes from the Reuse-A-Shoe program, and unsellable footwear. The purpose of Nike Grind is to eliminate waste in line with the tenets of sustainable fashion practices and close the loop on Nike's product lifecycle. Materials recycled include rubber, foam, fiber, leather and textile blends, which are separated and ground into granules.

== Recycling process ==
Nike Grind materials are primarily composed of manufacturing scraps but also include a mixture of recycled and unsold shoes. Many of the recycled shoes are collected through Nike's Reuse-A-Shoe program, which began in the early 1990s and takes in around 1.5 million pairs annually. The program takes worn-out shoes (of any brand) that are donated by consumers, often at Nike retail stores. After donation, the shoes are shipped to one of two recycling facilities in the United States or Belgium, where they are then processed into Nike Grind materials.

Three different types of material are taken from each shoe: rubber from the outsole, foam from the midsole and fabric from the upper. Then, the separated materials of rubber, foam, fiber, leather, and textile blends are ground into granules that can be reconstituted into several different products and materials.

== Uses ==
Nike Grind materials are incorporated into some Nike products, including footwear, apparel, and the yarn that composes them. These materials are also used in running tracks, turf fields, playground surfaces, courts, weight room flooring, and carpet underlay. Since its inception, Nike Grind has been used on over 1 billion square feet of sports surfaces in total.

The first synthetic turf soccer field installed with Nike Grind rubber was at Douglas Park. That surface was donated by Nike and the U.S. Soccer Foundation. Nike Grind has since been incorporated into the court at Golden 1 Center in Sacramento, California, training facilities at Yankee Stadium in New York; and the track at Old Trafford Stadium in Manchester, England, among others.

Using Nike Grind materials in a building project may help gain points toward obtaining LEED certification.
