= Huyton & Prescot Golf Club =

Golf course in Merseyside, England

Coordinates: 53°25′N 2°49′W

Huyton & Prescot Golf Club is a mature parkland golf course in Merseyside. Originally designed by James Braid, it was established in 1905 on the old Atherton family home and estate, Hurst Park. Prior to the Athertons, the rich colliery owner, Richard Evans had lived there and had spent considerable money creating the estate and current Club House which is now a Grade II listed building. It is also friendly hosting different events, like parties and funerals.
