= Hillcrest Country Club (Boise, Idaho) =

Golf course in Boise, Idaho

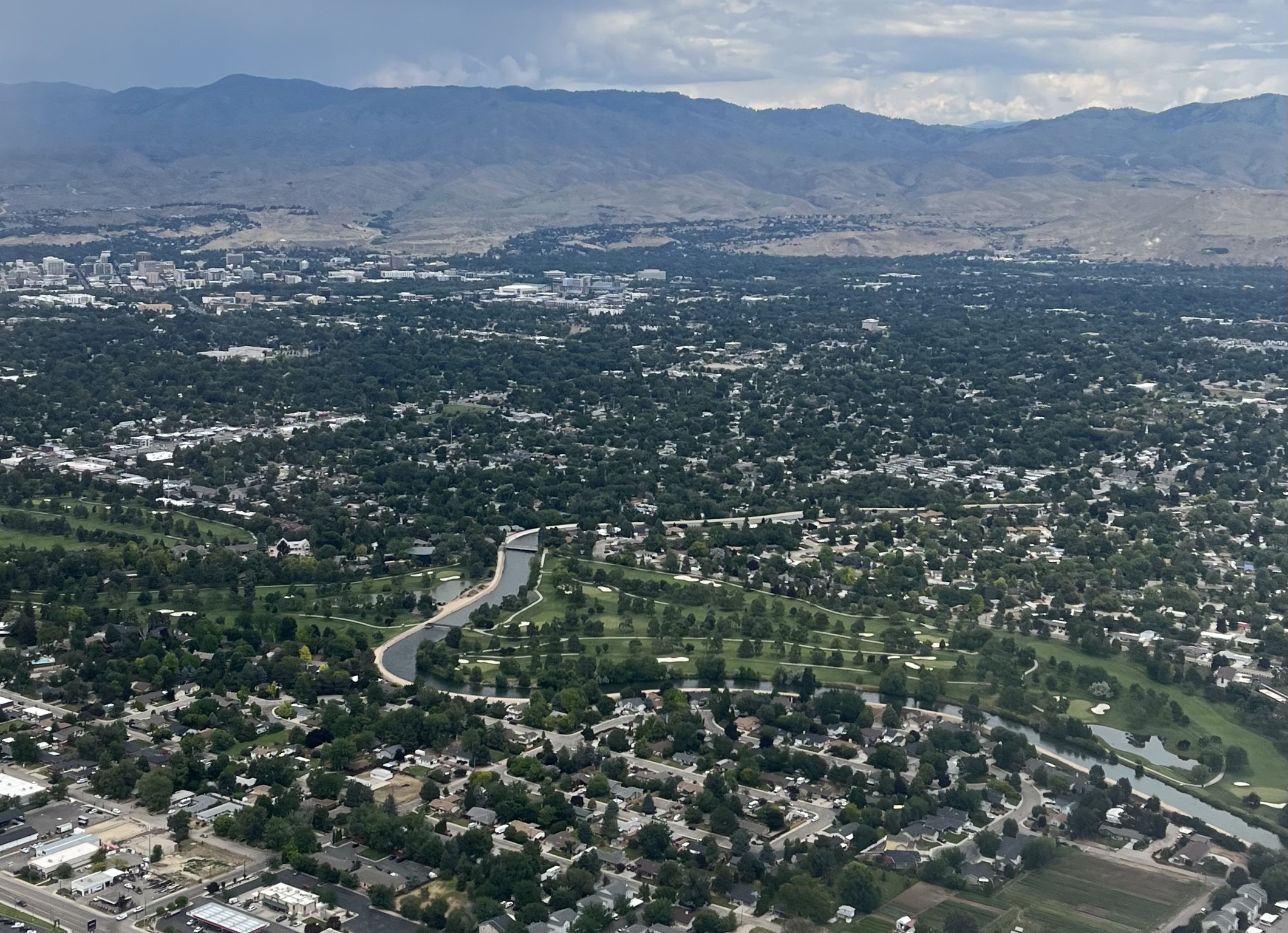
- Aerial view from southwest in 2023

- Location in the United States Location in Idaho
- 43.586°N 116.239°W

Club information
- Location: 4610 Hillcrest Drive; Boise, Idaho, U.S.
- Elevation: 2,800 feet (850 m)
- Established: 1940, 1957
- Type: Private
- Total holes: 18
- Tournaments: Albertsons Boise Open (Korn Ferry Tour) (1990–present)
- Website: hillcrest.cc
- Designed by: A. Vernon Macan; 1968 renovation – Robert Muir Graves
- Par: 71
- Length: 6,825 yards (6,241 m)
- Course rating: 71.6
- Slope rating: 130
- Course record: 59 by Russell Knox (July 26, 2013)

Hillcrest Country Club is a country club in the western United States in Boise, Idaho. Located in the bench area in the southwest area of the city, it is immediately northwest of the Boise Airport. The club hosts the Boise Open professional golf tournament, a regular stop on the Korn Ferry Tour.

== History ==
The site was originally the Idaho Country Club, which was formed in 1925 and built the original nine holes of the golf course. The clubhouse and course were purchased in 1935 and the name was changed to Boise Country Club. Established in 1940, Hillcrest opened the second nine holes in 1958, at the south end of the property.

All 18 holes were developed by the noted course designer A. Vernon Macan (1882–1964). A skilled amateur player, Macan was born in Ireland and moved to Canada in 1912, and settled in Victoria. He designed many prominent courses in the northwestern U.S. and southern British Columbia.

The golf course at Hillcrest was renovated in 1968 by Robert Muir Graves. A relatively flat track with elevated tees and greens, Hillcrest has many water hazards, in play on 12 of the 18 holes (six ponds and the New York Canal, the valley's primary concrete irrigation channel.

Its new clubhouse opened fifteen years ago in 2011.

== Boise Open ==
Hillcrest Country Club is the host course for the Albertsons Boise Open, a professional golf tournament on the Korn Ferry Tour, now part of its playoffs in mid-August. It has been held at the club since 1990, the inaugural year of the Ben Hogan Tour. The members' front & back nines are reversed for the tournament, with the newer (southern) nine holes played first.

The Boise Open has one of the largest purses on the Korn Ferry Tour, and is consistently one of its most supported and attended events.

For the professionals, the relatively short layout at Hillcrest places a premium on accuracy. The par 71 course is 6,825 yards (6,241 m) from the back tees, at an average elevation of just under 2,800 feet (850 m) above sea level.

The course record of 59 (−12) was set by Russell Knox in 2013. with two eagles and eight birdies in the second round on Friday, July 26.

== LPGA Tour ==
In 1963, Hillcrest hosted the Idaho Centennial Ladies' Open on the LPGA Tour, held during the Labor Day weekend. Mickey Wright won the 54-hole event by four shots over runner-up Kathy Whitworth.
