= Manito Golf and Country Club =

Country club in Comstock, Spokane, Washington

- Location within Washington (state) Location within the United States
- 47.609°N 117.395°W

Club information
- Location: 5303 S. Hatch Road; Spokane, Washington, U.S.
- Elevation: 2,380 feet (725 m)
- Established: 1922, 104 years ago 1917 (at Hart Field)
- Type: Private
- Tota holes: 18
- Tournaments: 1944 PGA Championship
- Website: www.manitocc.com
- Designed by: A.V. Macan
- Par: 71
- Length: 6,470 yd (5,916 m)
- Course rating: 70.8
- Slope rating: 134

Manito Golf and Country Club is a country club in the northwest United States, located in the Comstock neighborhood of Spokane, Washington. The club was founded in 1917 at Hart Field by a small group of dedicated golf enthusiasts and moved to its current location in the Comstock neighborhood in 1922. It was known as Manito Golf Club until 1935.

Its golf course hosted the PGA Championship in 1944, then match play, in which Bob Hamilton upset favored Byron Nelson in the final. The course was designed by A.V. Macan, and was set at 6,330 yards (5,788 m) in late 1921. The back tees are now at 6,470 yards (5,916 m) at par 71, with a course rating of 70.8 and a slope rating of 134.

The elevation at the clubhouse is approximately 2,380 feet (725 m) above sea level.
