= Portland Open Invitational =

Professional golf tournament (1944–1966)

Coordinates: 45.477°N 122.763°W

Tournament information
- Location: Portland, Oregon
- Established: 1944
- Course: Columbia Edgewater Country Club
- Par: 72
- Length: 6,435 yards (5,884 m)
- Tour: PGA Tour
- Format: Stroke play
- Prize fund: US$50,000
- Month played: September
- Final year: 1966

Tournament record score
- Aggregate: 261 Ben Hogan (1945)
- To par: –27 as above

Final champion
- (United States) Bert Yancey

Location map
- Location in the United States Location in Oregon

The Portland Open Invitational was a professional golf tournament in the northwest United States on the PGA Tour, played in Portland, Oregon. Established by Robert A. Hudson with a $10,000 purse in 1944, it was played from 1944 to 1948 and again from 1959 to 1966. The event was hosted eight times at the Portland Golf Club, and four times at the Columbia Edgewater Country Club. First played as the Portland Open, the revived 1959 event played as the Portland Centennial Open Invitational, in honor of Oregon's centennial of statehood.

Sam Snead won the inaugural event in 1944, and Ben Hogan won in 1945 by fourteen strokes, and also won the 1946 PGA Championship, then a match play event, held at the Portland Golf Club. The club also hosted the Ryder Cup in 1947; the U.S. team was captained by Hogan and won 11–1. Hogan was a runner-up in 1948, a stroke back in an 18-hole playoff.

The tournament was dominated by three-time winners Billy Casper (1959–61) and Jack Nicklaus (1962, 1964–65). Nicklaus' $3,500 win during his rookie season in 1962 concluded three weeks of victories; he took the massive winner's share of $50,000 in the exhibition World Series of Golf in Ohio, and then won his second tour title at the Seattle Open Invitational, which paid $4,300. Both Casper and Nicklaus won at both courses.

Bert Yancey won the last edition in 1966 and took only 102 putts. It stood as the tour's 72-hole record for fewest putts for over a decade, until Bob Menne had only 99 at the Tournament Players Championship in 1977, but tied for 47th.

== Tournament hosts ==
Venue	Years
Portland Golf Club	1944, 1945, 1947, 1948, 1959, 1960, 1964, 1965
Columbia Edgewater Country Club	1961, 1962, 1963, 1966

== Winners ==
Year	Winner	Score	To par	Margin of victory	Runner(s)-up	Purse (US$)	Winner's share ($)	Ref.
Portland Open Invitational
1966	(United States) Bert Yancey	271	−17	3 strokes	(United States) Billy Casper	50,000	6,600	
1965	(United States) Jack Nicklaus (3)	273	−15	3 strokes	(United States) Dave Marr	50,000	6,600	
1964	(United States) Jack Nicklaus (2)	275	−13	3 strokes	(United States) Ken Venturi	40,000	5,800	
1963	(Canada) George Knudson	272	−16	Playoff	(United States) Mason Rudolph	30,000	4,300	
1962	(United States) Jack Nicklaus	269	−19	1 stroke	(United States) George Bayer	25,000	3,500	
1961	(United States) Billy Casper (3)	273	−15	1 stroke	(United States) Dave Hill	25,000	3,500	
1960	(United States) Billy Casper (2)	266	−22	2 strokes	(United States) Paul Harney	27,500	2,800	
Portland Centennial Open Invitational
1959	(United States) Billy Casper	269	−19	3 strokes	(United States) Bob Duden (United States) Dave Ragan	20,000	2,800	
Portland Open Invitational
1949–1958: No tournament
1948	(United States) Fred Haas	270	−18	Playoff	(United States) Ben Hogan (2nd) (United States) Johnny Palmer (3rd)	15,000	2,450	
1947	(United States) Charles Congdon	270	−18	6 strokes	(United States) Clayton Heafner (United States) Herman Keiser (United States) Johnny Palmer (United States) George Payton	10,000	2,000	
1946: No tournament'
1945	(United States) Ben Hogan	261	−27	14 strokes	(United States) Byron Nelson	14,333	2,666	
Portland Open
1944	(United States) Sam Snead	289	+1	2 strokes	(United States) Mike Turnesa	16,000	2,675	

== Playoffs ==
- 1948: 18-hole Monday playoff: Haas 70 (−2), Hogan 71 (−1), Palmer 75 (+3).
- 1963: Knudson chipped in for eagle on the first playoff hole, a par-5, for the win; Rudolph nearly matched it, but his bounced out.

== See also ==
- Culture of Portland, Oregon
- WinCo Foods Portland Open, a current event on the Korn Ferry Tour
- Cambia Portland Classic, a current event on the LPGA Tour
