= Columbia Edgewater Country Club =

Golf course in Portland, Oregon, U.S.

- Location within the United States Location within Oregon
- 45.599°N 122.643°W

Club information
- Location: 2220 NE Marine Drive; Portland, Oregon, U.S.
- Elevation: 20 feet (6 m)
- Established: 1924, 102 years ago
- Type: Private
- Tota holes: 18
- Tournaments: Portland Classic; Portland Open Invitational
- Greens: Poa annua
- Fairways: Poa annua
- Website: cecc.com
- Designed by: A.V. Macan
- Par: 71
- Length: 6,823 yards (6,239 m)
- Course rating: 73.4
- Slope rating: 134

Columbia Edgewater Country Club is a private golf course in the northwest United States, located in Portland, Oregon. Founded in 1924, it has hosted numerous tour events on the PGA Tour and LPGA Tour. It is located immediately west of the Portland International Airport.

Designed by A.V. Macan, the course opened in July 1925, just south of the Columbia River. It hosted the Portland Open Invitational on the PGA Tour four times in the 1960s, and has hosted the Portland Classic on the LPGA Tour over thirty times.
