= 1961 Masters Tournament =

Golf tournament held in 1961

- Front cover of the 1961 Masters Guide

Tournament information
- Dates: April 6–10, 1961
- Location: Augusta, Georgia; 33.503°N 82.020°W
- Course: Augusta National Golf Club
- Organized by: Augusta National Golf Club
- Tour: PGA Tour

Statistics
- Par: 72
- Length: 6,980 yards (6,383 m)
- Field: 88 players, 41 after cut
- Cut: 149 (+5)
- Prize fund: $109,100
- Winner's share: $20,000

Champion
- (South Africa) Gary Player
- 280 (−8)

Location map
- Location in the United States Location in Georgia

The 1961 Masters Tournament was the 25th Masters Tournament, held April 6–10 at Augusta National Golf Club in Augusta, Georgia.

Due to heavy rains and flooding of several greens, Sunday's final round was halted before 4 p.m. and the scores were erased, even though ten players had completed their rounds. Third round leader Gary Player was even par through eleven holes, and defending champion Arnold Palmer was two-under through nine. The entire round was replayed the next day.

In the final round on Monday, Player defeated Palmer and amateur Charles Coe by one stroke to become the first international champion at the Masters. Player made an up and down from the bunker on the final hole but thought he had lost the tournament, after carding a disappointing 40 (+4) on the back nine. In the final pairing with a one-shot lead, Palmer needed a par on the final hole for the win. From the fairway, his approach shot also landed in the bunker right of the green. With a poor lie, Palmer's bunker shot went past the hole and off the green and down a hillock. Using his putter from off the green, he failed to get the fourth shot close, then missed the 15-foot (4.5 m) bogey putt which would have forced a playoff.

It was the first of three green jackets for Player, age 25, and the second of his nine major titles. His other wins at Augusta came over a decade later in 1974 and 1978. Jack Nicklaus, 21, recorded the first of his 22 top-10 finishes at the Masters, his last as an amateur. He tied for seventh, but the low amateur honors went to Coe. Nicklaus regained the U.S. Amateur title in September at Pebble Beach and turned professional in November.

A field of 88 players entered the tournament and 41 of them made the cut at five-over-par (149).

Amateur Deane Beman won the Par 3 Contest with a score of 22; he turned pro in 1967 and later became the second commissioner of the PGA Tour, from 1974 to 1994.

== Field ==
1. Masters champions

Jack Burke Jr. (4,8,11), Jimmy Demaret, Doug Ford (4,10,11), Claude Harmon (8), Ben Hogan (2,3,4,8,9), Herman Keiser, Cary Middlecoff (2,11), Byron Nelson (2,4), Arnold Palmer (2,8,9,10), Gene Sarazen (2,3,4), Horton Smith, Sam Snead (3,4,8,10,11), Craig Wood (2)

- Ralph Guldahl (2), Henry Picard (4), and Art Wall Jr. (11) did not play.

The following categories only apply to Americans

2. U.S. Open champions

Tommy Bolt (8), Julius Boros (8,9,11), Billy Burke, Billy Casper (8,9), Jack Fleck (9), Ed Furgol, Tony Manero, Lloyd Mangrum, Dick Mayer, Fred McLeod, Sam Parks Jr., Lew Worsham

3. The Open champions

Jock Hutchison (4), Denny Shute (4)

4. PGA champions

Walter Burkemo, Dow Finsterwald (8,9,11), Vic Ghezzi, Chick Harbert, Chandler Harper, Jay Hebert (10,11), Lionel Hebert (8), Johnny Revolta, Bob Rosburg (8,11), Jim Turnesa

5. U.S. Amateur and Amateur champions

Deane Beman (6,7,a), Dick Chapman (a), Charles Coe (6,a), Jack Nicklaus (6,8,9,a), Robert Sweeny Jr. (a)

6. Members of the 1959 U.S. Walker Cup team

William C. Campbell (a), Bill Hyndman (7,a), Chuck Kocsis (a), Billy Joe Patton (8,a), Bud Taylor (8,a), Ward Wettlaufer (a)

- Tommy Aaron had turned professional. Campbell and Kocsis were reserves for the team. Harvie Ward did not play.

7. 1960 U.S. Amateur quarter-finalists

John Farquhar (a), Robert W. Gardner (a), Charles Lewis III (a), Steve Spray (a), Claude Wild (a)

8. Top 24 players and ties from the 1960 Masters Tournament

Fred Hawkins, Don January (10), Ted Kroll (9), Mike Souchak (9,11), Ken Venturi

- Ed Oliver did not play.

9. Top 16 players and ties from the 1960 U.S. Open

Jerry Barber, George Bayer, Don Cherry (a), Paul Harney, Bob Harris, Dutch Harrison, Johnny Pott

10. Top eight players and ties from 1960 PGA Championship

Wes Ellis, Doug Sanders

- Jim Ferrier (4) did not play

11. Members of the U.S. 1959 Ryder Cup team

12. One player, either amateur or professional, not already qualified, selected by a ballot of ex-Masters champions

Gene Littler

13. One professional, not already qualified, selected by a ballot of ex-U.S. Open champions

Bob Goalby

14. One amateur, not already qualified, selected by a ballot of ex-U.S. Amateur champions

Bob Cochran (a)

15. Two players, not already qualified, from a points list based on finishes in the winter part of the 1961 PGA Tour

Bill Collins, Mason Rudolph

16. Foreign invitations

Keith Alexander (a), Al Balding, Phil Brownlee (a), Antonio Cerdá, Bruce Crampton (8), Roberto De Vicenzo, Mário Gonzalez, Bill Kerr, Stan Leonard (8), Sebastián Miguel, Ángel Miguel, Kel Nagle (3), Gary Player (3,8), Chi-Chi Rodríguez, Miguel Sala, Peter Thomson (3)

- Numbers in brackets indicate categories that the player would have qualified under had they been American.

== Round summaries ==
=== First round ===
Thursday, April 6, 1961

Place	Player	Score	To par
T1	(United States) Arnold Palmer	68	−4
T1	(United States) Bob Rosburg	68	−4
3	(South Africa) Gary Player	69	−3
4	(United States) Jack Nicklaus (a)	70	−2
T5	(United States) Doug Ford	71	−1
T5	(United States) Paul Harney	71	−1
T5	(United States) Byron Nelson	71	−1
T5	(United States) Johnny Pott	71	−1
T9	(United States) Tommy Bolt	72	E
T9	(United States) Billy Casper	72	E
T9	(United States) Charles Coe (a)	72	E
T9	(United States) Jay Hebert	72	E
T9	(Canada) Stan Leonard	72	E
T9	(United States) Gene Littler	72	E
T9	(United States) Ken Venturi	72	E

=== Second round ===
Friday, April 7, 1961

Place	Player	Score	To par
T1	(United States) Arnold Palmer	68-69=137	−7
T1	(South Africa) Gary Player	69-68=137	−7
3	(United States) Bob Rosburg	68-73=141	−3
4	(United States) Don January	74-68=142	−2
T5	(United States) Tommy Bolt	72-71=143	−1
T5	(United States) Walter Burkemo	74-69=143	−1
T5	(United States) Charles Coe (a)	72-71=143	−1
T5	(United States) Lionel Hebert	74-69=143	−1
T5	(United States) Ted Kroll	73-70=143	−1
T5	(United States) Byron Nelson	71-72=143	−1
T5	(United States) Ken Venturi	72-71=143	−1

=== Third round ===
Saturday, April 8, 1961

Place	Player	Score	To par
1	(South Africa) Gary Player	69-68-69=206	−10
2	(United States) Arnold Palmer	68-69-73=210	−6
T3	(United States) Charles Coe (a)	72-71-69=212	−4
T3	(United States) Paul Harney	71-73-68=212	−4
5	(United States) Bill Collins	74-72-67=213	−3
T6	(United States) Jack Burke Jr.	76-70-68=214	−2
T6	(United States) Don January	74-68-72=214	−2
T6	(United States) Bob Rosburg	68-73-73=214	−2
T9	(United States) Ted Kroll	73-70-72=215	−1
T9	(United States) Jack Nicklaus (a)	70-75-70=215	−1
T9	(United States) Doug Sanders	76-71-68=215	−1
T9	(United States) Ken Venturi	72-71-72=215	−1

=== Final round ===
Sunday, April 9, 1961
Monday, April 10, 1961

==== Summary ====
Play on Sunday was washed out due to heavy rain and wind shortly after 4 pm and all scores were erased; the final round was replayed on Monday. Although Player was the leader after 54 holes, he finished his round nearly an hour ahead of Palmer's double-bogey at the final hole.

==== Final leaderboard ====
Champion
Silver Cup winner (low amateur)
(a) = amateur
(c) = past champion

Top 10
Place	Player	Score	To par	Money (US$)
1	(South Africa) Gary Player	69-68-69-74=280	−8	20,000
T2	(United States) Charles Coe (a)	72-71-69-69=281	−7	0
T2	(United States) Arnold Palmer (c)	68-69-73-71=281	−7	12,000
T4	(United States) Tommy Bolt	72-71-74-68=285	−3	7,000
T4	(United States) Don January	74-68-72-71=285	−3	7,000
6	(United States) Paul Harney	71-73-68-74=286	−2	4,800
T7	(United States) Jack Burke Jr. (c)	76-70-68-73=287	−1	3,200
T7	(United States) Billy Casper	72-77-69-69=287	−1	3,200
T7	(United States) Bill Collins	74-72-67-74=287	−1	3,200
T7	(United States) Jack Nicklaus (a)	70-75-70-72=287	−1	0

Leaderboard below the top 10
Place	Player	Score	To par	Money ($)
T11	(United States) Walter Burkemo	74-69-73-72=288	E	1,667
T11	(United States) Robert W. Gardner (a)	74-71-72-71=288	E	0
T11	(United States) Doug Sanders	76-71-68-73=288	E	1,667
T11	(United States) Ken Venturi	72-71-72-73=288	E	1,667
T15	(Canada) Stan Leonard	72-74-71-72=289	+1	1,300
T15	(United States) Gene Littler	72-73-72-72=289	+1	1,300
T15	(United States) Bob Rosburg	68-73-73-75=289	+1	1,300
T15	(United States) Sam Snead (c)	74-73-69-73=289	+1	1,300
T19	(United States) Dick Mayer	76-72-70-73=291	+3	1,133
T19	(United States) Johnny Pott	71-75-72-73=291	+3	1,133
T19	(Australia) Peter Thomson	73-76-68-74=291	+3	1,133
T22	(Argentina) Roberto De Vicenzo	73-74-71-74=292	+4	1,000
T22	(United States) Lew Worsham	74-71-73-74=292	+4	1,000
T24	(Argentina) Antonio Cerdá	73-73-72-75=293	+5	1,000
T24	(United States) Fred Hawkins	74-75-72-72=293	+5	1,000
T24	(United States) Ted Kroll	73-70-72-78=293	+5	1,000
27	(Canada) Al Balding	74-74-70-76=294	+6	1,000
T28	(United States) Mason Rudolph	77-69-72-77=295	+7	500
T28	(United States) Mike Souchak	75-72-75-73=295	+7	500
T30	(United States) Jay Hebert	72-75-69-80=296	+8	500
T30	(United States) Lionel Hebert	74-69-74-79=296	+8	500
T32	(United States) Doug Ford (c)	71-76-78-73=298	+10	500
T32	(United States) Ben Hogan (c)	74-73-72-79=298	+10	500
T32	(United States) Byron Nelson (c)	71-72-78-77=298	+10	500
35	(United States) Chick Harbert	74-73-76-76=299	+11	500
36	(United States) Bob Goalby	74-73-76-77=300	+12	500
37	(United States) Jerry Barber	74-72-78-77=301	+13	500
38	(Colombia) Miguel Sala	74-75-78-81=308	+20	500
CUT	(United States) Deane Beman (a)	73-77=150	+6	
CUT	(United States) Chuck Kocsis (a)	77-73=150	+6	
CUT	(United States) Charles Lewis III (a)	74-76=150	+6	
CUT	(United States) Cary Middlecoff (c)	75-75=150	+6	
CUT	(Spain) Ángel Miguel	75-75=150	+6	
CUT	(Puerto Rico) Chi-Chi Rodríguez	77-73=150	+6	
CUT	(United States) Jim Turnesa	80-70=150	+6	
CUT	(United States) George Bayer	77-74=151	+7	
CUT	(United States) Julius Boros	75-76=151	+7	
CUT	(United States) Robert Sweeny Jr. (a)	74-77=151	+7	
CUT	(Canada) Keith Alexander (a)	76-76=152	+8	
CUT	(United States) Dow Finsterwald	73-79=152	+8	
CUT	(Brazil) Mário Gonzalez	76-76=152	+8	
CUT	(Spain) Sebastián Miguel	74-78=152	+8	
CUT	(United States) Bud Taylor (a)	74-78=152	+8	
CUT	(United States) Don Cherry (a)	79-74=153	+9	
CUT	(Australia) Bruce Crampton	80-73=153	+9	
CUT	(United States) Jimmy Demaret (c)	75-78=153	+9	
CUT	(Canada) Bill Kerr	75-78=153	+9	
CUT	(Australia) Kel Nagle	75-78=153	+9	
CUT	(United States) Billy Joe Patton (a)	78-75=153	+9	
CUT	(United States) Bill Hyndman (a)	74-80=154	+10	
CUT	(United States) Lloyd Mangrum	80-75=155	+11	
CUT	(United States) Sam Parks Jr.	80-75=155	+11	
CUT	(United States) Ed Furgol	75-81=156	+12	
CUT	(United States) Gene Sarazen (c)	79-77=156	+12	
CUT	(United States) William C. Campbell (a)	76-81=157	+13	
CUT	(United States) Vic Ghezzi	74-83=157	+13	
CUT	(United States) Claude Harmon (c)	76-81=157	+13	
CUT	(United States) Bob Harris	79-78=157	+13	
CUT	(Canada) Phil Brownlee (a)	79-79=158	+14	
CUT	(United States) Dick Chapman (a)	80-79=159	+15	
CUT	(United States) Steve Spray (a)	80-79=159	+15	
CUT	(United States) Billy Burke	81-79=160	+16	
CUT	(United States) Bob Cochran (a)	80-80=160	+16	
CUT	(United States) John Farquhar (a)	77-83=160	+16	
CUT	(United States) Craig Wood (c)	80-80=160	+16	
CUT	(United States) Claude Wild (a)	78-83=161	+17	
CUT	(United States) Herman Keiser (c)	81-81=162	+18	
CUT	(United States) Tony Manero	80-82=162	+18	
CUT	(United States) Johnny Revolta	84-80=164	+20	
CUT	(United States) Denny Shute	77-88=165	+21	
CUT	(United States) Ward Wettlaufer (a)	80-85=165	+21	
CUT	(United States) Horton Smith (c)	86-83=169	+25	
WD	(United States) Jack Fleck	74-71-73=218	+2	
WD	(United States) Wes Ellis	75-73-74=222	+6	
WD	(United States) Dutch Harrison	74-74-78=226	+10	
WD	(United States) Chandler Harper	74	+2	
WD	(United States) Jock Hutchison			
WD	(United States) Fred McLeod			

==== Scorecard ====
Hole	1	2	3	4	5	6	7	8	9	10	11	12	13	14	15	16	17	18
Par	4	5	4	3	4	3	4	5	4	4	4	3	5	4	5	3	4	4
(South Africa) Player	−11	−12	−12	−12	−12	−12	−12	−12	−12	−11	−11	−11	−9	−9	−8	−8	−8	−8
(United States) Palmer	−6	−7	−7	−7	−7	−8	−8	−9	−9	−9	−9	−9	−9	−9	−9	−9	−9	−7
(United States) Coe	−4	−5	−5	−6	−6	−5	−5	−5	−5	−5	−4	−4	−5	−6	−7	−7	−7	−7

Cumulative tournament scores, relative to par

Birdie	Bogey	Double bogey
