= 1955 PGA Championship =

Golf tournament

Coordinates: 42.437°N 83.447°W

Tournament information
- Dates: July 20–26, 1955
- Location: Northville Twp, Michigan
- Course: Meadowbrook Country Club
- Organized by: PGA of America
- Tour: PGA Tour
- Format: Match play - 6 rounds

Statistics
- Par: 71
- Length: 6,701 yards (6,127 m)
- Field: 135 players, 64 to match play
- Cut: 147 (+5), playoff
- Prize fund: $20,700
- Winner's share: $5,000

Champion
- (United States) Doug Ford
- def. Cary Middlecoff, 4 and 3

Location in the United States
Location in Michigan

The 1955 PGA Championship was the 37th PGA Championship, held July 20–26 in Michigan at Meadowbrook Country Club in Northville Township, northwest of nearby Detroit. Doug Ford won the match play championship, 4 and 3 over Cary Middlecoff in the Tuesday final; the winner's share was $5,000 and the runner-up earned $3,000. This was the first of two major titles for Ford, who won the Masters in 1957.

Ford was also the medalist in the stroke-play qualifying with a 135 (−7), worth $250 and the Alex Smith trophy. He was the fourth to win the final match after winning the qualifier, joining Walter Hagen (1926), Olin Dutra (1932), and Byron Nelson (1945). Ford was the last medalist, as the format was changed in 1956 to seven rounds without a qualifier for two years, then to 72-hole stroke play in 1958.

Defending champion Chick Harbert, a local resident, was defeated in the second round by Johnny Palmer, 1 up. No former champion advanced past the second round.

This was second time in three years the PGA Championship was played near Detroit; the 1953 event was played at Birmingham Country Club in Birmingham, about 20 miles (30 km) northeast. The 1947 edition, in which Harbert was runner-up, was also held in the Detroit area.

== Format ==
The match play format at the PGA Championship in 1955 called for 12 rounds (216 holes) in seven days:

- Wednesday and Thursday – 36-hole stroke play qualifier, 18 holes per day;
  - defending champion Chick Harbert and the top 63 professionals advanced to match play
- Friday – first two rounds, 18 holes each
- Saturday – third round – 36 holes
- Sunday – quarterfinals – 36 holes
- Monday – semifinals – 36 holes
- Tuesday – final – 36 holes

== Final results ==
Tuesday, July 26, 1955

Place	Player	Money ($)
1	(United States) Doug Ford	5,000
2	(United States) Cary Middlecoff	3,000
T3	(United States) Tommy Bolt	750
T3	(United States) Shelley Mayfield	750
T5	(United States) Jack Burke Jr.	500
T5	(United States) Don Fairfield	500
T5	(United States) Fred Hawkins	500
T5	(United States) Lew Worsham	500

== Results ==
=== Top half ===
Last 64; July 22
Brien Charter	2&1
Jimmy Johnson
Jerry Barber
Lionel Hebert	2&1
Don Fairfield	3&1
Walter Romans
Pete Cooper
Vic Ghezzi	4&3
Gene Sarazen	6&4
Clarence Doser
Shelley Mayfield	6&5
Ted Neist
Claude Harmon	5&4
Mike Turnesa
Errie Ball
Eldon Briggs	1up
Gus Salerno	2&1
Gunnard Johnson
Ed Furgol	20h
Jimmy Gauntt
Fred Hawkins	3&2
Eddie Joseph
Skee Riegel
Fred Haas	3&2
Mike Dietz
Leonard Wagner	1up
Wally Ulrich	19h
Dutch Harrison
Ted Kroll	3&2
Buck White
Doug Ford	2&1
George Fazio

Last 32; July 22
Brien Charter	1up
Lionel Hebert
Don Fairfield	23h
Vic Ghezzi
Gene Sarazen
Shelley Mayfield	4&3
Claude Harmon	2&1
Eldon Briggs
Gus Salerno
Ed Furgol	20h
Fred Hawkins	2up
Fred Haas
Leonard Wagner
Wally Ulrich	2up
Ted Kroll
Doug Ford	2&1

Last 16; July 23
Brien Charter
Don Fairfield	2&1
Shelley Mayfield	1up
Claude Harmon
Ed Furgol
Fred Hawkins	6&5
Wally Ulrich
Doug Ford	12&10

Quarter-finals; July 24
Don Fairfield
Shelley Mayfield	3&2
Fred Hawkins
Doug Ford	5&4

Semi-finals; July 25
Shelley Mayfield
Doug Ford	4&3

=== Bottom half ===
Last 64; July 22
Chick Harbert	3&1
Eric Monti
Johnny Palmer	5&4
Roy Wallin
Lew Worsham	2&1
Dick Lundahl
Jackson Bradley
Ray Hill	2&1
Sam Snead	2&1
Al Feminelli
Tommy Bolt	w/o
Al Watrous
Jack Fleck	4&2
Joe Zarhardt
Jay Hebert	4&3
Alex Redl
Cary Middlecoff	2&1
Walter Burkemo
Bill Nary	2&1
Darwin White
Ed Oliver
Jim Browning	3&2
Mike Pavella	3&2
Bob Kay
Marty Furgol	3&2
Jack Igoe
Tony Holguin	1up
Joe Greer
Jack Burke Jr.	4&2
Guy Paulsen
Dave Douglas	4&3
Herman Scharlau

Last 32; July 22
Chick Harbert
Johnny Palmer	1up
Lew Worsham	2&1
Ray Hill
Sam Snead
Tommy Bolt	3&2
Jack Fleck	2&1
Jay Hebert
Cary Middlecoff	3&2
Bill Nary
Jim Browning
Mike Pavella	4&3
Marty Furgol	1up
Tony Holguin
Jack Burke Jr.	8&6
Dave Douglas

Last 16; July 23
Johnny Palmer
Lew Worsham	6&5
Tommy Bolt	3&1
Jack Fleck
Cary Middlecoff	8&6
Mike Pavella
Marty Furgol
Jack Burke Jr.	2&1

Quarter-finals; July 24
Lew Worsham
Tommy Bolt	8&7
Cary Middlecoff	40h
Jack Burke Jr.

Semi-finals; July 25
Tommy Bolt
Cary Middlecoff	4&3

w/o = won by walkover

=== Final ===
July 26, Morning

Hole	1	2	3	4	5	6	7	8	9	10	11	12	13	14	15	16	17	18
Par	4	5	4	4	4	3	4	3	4	4	3	5	3	4	4	4	5	4
(United States) Ford	4	5	4	4	4	2	4	3	4	4	3	4	2	4	5	4	4	4
(United States) Middlecoff	3	5	4	4	4	3	3	3	3	4	3	5	3	3	4	4	5	4
Leader	M1	M1	M1	M1	M1	–	M1	M1	M2	M2	M2	M1	–	M1	M2	M2	M1	M1

Afternoon

Hole	1	2	3	4	5	6	7	8	9	10	11	12	13	14	15	16	17	18
Par	4	5	4	4	4	3	4	3	4	4	3	5	3	4	4	4	5	4
(United States) Ford	4	5	4	4	4	3	4	2	4	4	2	4	4	3	4	Ford wins 4 and 3		
(United States) Middlecoff	5	4	4	5	4	3	4	4	4	4	4	5	3	4	5	Ford wins 4 and 3		
Leader	–	M1	M1	–	–	–	–	F1	F1	F1	F2	F3	F2	F3	F4	Ford wins 4 and 3		

Birdie	Bogey
