= 1955 U.S. Open (golf) =

Coordinates: 37.709°N 122.495°W

Tournament information
- Dates: June 16–19, 1955
- Location: San Francisco, California
- Course(s): Olympic Club, Lake Course
- Organized by: USGA
- Tour: PGA Tour

Statistics
- Par: 70
- Length: 6,700 yards (6,126 m)
- Field: 158 players, 58 after cut
- Cut: 155 (+15)
- Winner's share: $6,000

Champion
- (United States) Jack Fleck
- 287 (+7), playoff

Location in the United States

The 1955 U.S. Open was the 55th U.S. Open, held June 16–19 at the Lake Course of the Olympic Club in San Francisco, California. In one of the greatest upsets in golf history, Jack Fleck, a municipal course pro from Iowa, prevailed in an 18-hole playoff to win his only major title and denied Ben Hogan a record fifth U.S. Open.

Fleck, 32, won two more titles on the PGA Tour and later won the Senior PGA Championship in 1979. He won the U.S. Open with clubs manufactured by Hogan's company.

Hogan, 42, never did win his fifth U.S. Open or a tenth major; he won just one more tour event the rest of his career, in 1959. It was his fourth and final playoff in a major championship, all at 18 holes. Hogan won at the U.S. Open in 1950 but lost twice by a stroke at the Masters, to Byron Nelson in 1942 and Sam Snead in 1954. He repeated as runner-up at the U.S. Open in 1956, and had top ten finishes in 1958, 1959, and 1960. (A pre-tournament favorite in 1957, he withdrew due to a back ailment before teeing off.) When the U.S. Open returned to Olympic in 1966, Hogan finished twelfth at age 53 and received a standing ovation at the 72nd green.

Byron Nelson came out of semi-retirement to play in his final U.S. Open and finished in 28th place. Arnold Palmer made the cut for the first time at the U.S. Open and finished in 21st. For the first time since 1919, Gene Sarazen did not play in the U.S. Open, ending a streak of 31 consecutive appearances.

This was the first U.S. Open at the Lake Course of the Olympic Club; it returned in 1966, 1987, 1998, and 2012.

== Course layout ==
Lake Course

Hole	1	2	3	4	5	6	7	8	9	Out	10	11	12	13	14	15	16	17	18	In	Total
Yards	530	423	220	433	457	437	266	139	420	3,325	417	429	387	187	410	144	603	461	337	3,375	6,700
Par	5	4	3	4	4	4	4	3	4	35	4	4	4	3	4	3	5	4	4	35	70

== Round summaries ==
=== First round ===
Thursday, June 16, 1955

Place	Player	Score	To par
1	(United States) Tommy Bolt	67	−3
2	(United States) Walker Inman	70	E
3	(United States) Jack Burke Jr.	71	+1
4	(United States) Ben Hogan	72	+2
T5	(United States) Mike Souchak	73	+3
T5	(United States) Babe Lichardus	73	+3
T7	(United States) Doug Ford	74	+4
T7	(United States) Harvie Ward (a)	74	+4
T7	(United States) Arthur Bell	74	+4
T7	(Philippines) Celestino Tugot	74	+4
T7	(United States) Fred Hawkins	74	+4
T7	(United States) Elmer Reed	74	+4

=== Second round ===
Friday, June 17, 1955

Place	Player	Score	To par
T1	(United States) Harvie Ward (a)	74-70=144	+4
T1	(United States) Tommy Bolt	67-77=144	+4
T3	(United States) Julius Boros	76-69=145	+5
T3	(United States) Jack Fleck	76-69=145	+5
T3	(United States) Ben Hogan	72-73=145	+5
T3	(United States) Walker Inman	70-75=145	+5
T7	(United States) Sam Snead	79-69=148	+8
T7	(United States) Bob Harris	79-69=148	+8
T7	(United States) Jack Burke Jr.	71-77=148	+8
10	(United States) Gene Littler	76-73=149	+9

=== Third round ===
Saturday, June 18, 1955 (morning)

Place	Player	Score	To par
1	(United States) Ben Hogan	72-73-72=217	+7
T2	(United States) Julius Boros	76-69-73=218	+8
T2	(United States) Sam Snead	79-69-70=218	+8
T4	(United States) Tommy Bolt	67-77-75=219	+9
T4	(United States) Bob Rosburg	78-74-67=219	+9
T6	(United States) Jack Fleck	76-69-75=220	+10
T6	(United States) Harvie Ward (a)	74-70-76=220	+10
T6	(United States) Jack Burke Jr.	71-77-72=220	+10
9	(United States) Walker Inman	70-75-76=221	+11
10	(United States) Gene Littler	76-73-73=222	+12

=== Final round ===
Saturday, June 18, 1955 (afternoon)

After Hogan made par on the 72nd hole to post a 287 total, most observers believed that he had already locked up the championship. Gene Sarazen, providing television commentary, congratulated him on the win and the NBC broadcast went off the air after proclaiming Hogan the champion. Fleck, however, was only a stroke behind playing the 14th. A bogey there, however, dropped him to two back. Fleck then made birdie on 15 and pars at 16 and 17, after a 50-foot (15 m) birdie attempt lipped out. Needing a birdie on 18 to tie Hogan, Fleck played his approach from the edge of the rough to 8 feet (2.4 m), then knocked in the putt for a 67 and forced an 18-hole playoff on Sunday.

Place	Player	Score	To par	Money ($)
T1	(United States) Jack Fleck	76-69-75-67=287	+7	Playoff
T1	(United States) Ben Hogan	72-73-72-70=287	+7	Playoff
T3	(United States) Tommy Bolt	67-77-75-73=292	+12	1,500
T3	(United States) Sam Snead	79-69-70-74=292	+12	1,500
T5	(United States) Julius Boros	76-69-73-77=295	+15	870
T5	(United States) Bob Rosburg	78-74-67-76=295	+15	870
T7	(United States) Doug Ford	74-77-74-71=296	+16	540
T7	(United States) Bud Holscher	77-75-71-73=296	+16	540
T7	(United States) Harvie Ward (a)	74-70-76-76=296	+16	0
T10	(United States) Jack Burke Jr.	71-77-72-77=297	+17	390
T10	(United States) Mike Souchak	73-79-72-73=297	+17	390

(a) denotes amateur

=== Playoff ===
Sunday, June 19, 1955

Despite overwhelming odds against him, Fleck held a two-stroke lead over Hogan at the turn. After a third consecutive birdie at 10, Fleck's lead was three. But after a bogey at 17, the lead had dropped to just a single stroke on the 18th tee. Hogan hooked his drive into the very deep rough and took three strokes to get on the fairway: he made a 25-foot (8 m) putt to save double-bogey, but Fleck's regulation par sealed the upset by three strokes, 69 to 72.

Place	Player	Score	To par	Money ($)
1	(United States) Jack Fleck	69	−1	6,000
2	(United States) Ben Hogan	72	+2	3,600

==== Scorecard ====
Hole	1	2	3	4	5	6	7	8	9	10	11	12	13	14	15	16	17	18
Par	5	4	3	4	4	4	4	3	4	4	4	4	3	4	3	5	4	4
(United States) Fleck	E	E	E	E	E	E	E	−1	−2	−3	−2	−2	−2	−2	−2	−2	−1	−1
(United States) Hogan	E	E	E	E	+1	+1	+1	E	E	E	E	+1	+1	E	E	E	E	+2

Birdie	Bogey	Double bogey
