= Kansas City Open Invitational =

Golf tournament formerly on the PGA Tour

Tournament information
- Location: Kansas City, Missouri
- Established: 1949
- Course: Blue Hills Country Club
- Par: 72
- Tour: PGA Tour
- Format: Stroke play
- Prize fund: US$20,000
- Month played: September
- Final year: 1959

Tournament record score
- Aggregate: 268 Wally Ulrich (1954)
- To par: –24 as above

Final champion
- (United States) Dow Finsterwald
- Location in the United States Location in Missouri

The Kansas City Open Invitational, which played as the Kansas City Open for most of its history, was a golf tournament on the PGA Tour that was played in the greater Kansas City area in the late 1940s and 1950s. A total of four clubs hosted the event. The first event was held at Kansas City's Swope Park Golf Course, now known as Swope Memorial Golf Course, and is the only public course in the Kansas City area ever to have hosted a PGA Tour event. The Milburn Country Club in Overland Park, Kansas, a par-72, 18-hole championship course built in 1917, hosted the event five times. Kansas City's Hillcrest Country Club, a par-72, 18-hole course built in 1916, hosted the event three times. Two events were held at Blue Hills Country Club, which is also in Kansas City and was built in 1912.

== Tournament hosts ==
Years	Course
1955, 1957–58	Hillcrest Country Club
1954, 1959	Blue Hills Country Club
1950–53, 1956	Milburn Country Club
1949	Swope Park Golf Course

== Winners ==
Year	Winner	Score	To par	Margin of victory	Runner(s)-up	Winner's share ($)
Kansas City Open Invitational
1959	(United States) Dow Finsterwald	275	−13	Playoff	(United States) Don Fairfield	2,800
Kansas City Open
1958	(United States) Ernie Vossler	269	−19	3 strokes	(United States) Billy Maxwell	2,800
1957	(United States) Al Besselink	279	−9	3 strokes	(United States) George Bayer (United States) Dow Finsterwald	2,800
1956	(United States) Bo Wininger	273	−15	1 stroke	(United States) Fred Hawkins (United States) Bob Rosburg	4,300
1955	(United States) Dick Mayer	271	−17	6 strokes	(United States) Chandler Harper (United States) Billy Maxwell	4,000
1954	(United States) Wally Ulrich	268	−24	2 strokes	(United States) Gene Littler (United States) Lloyd Mangrum	4,000
1953	(United States) Ed Oliver	269	−19	2 strokes	(United States) Marty Furgol	3,000
1952	(United States) Cary Middlecoff (2)	276	−12	Playoff	(United States) Jack Burke Jr.	2,400
1951	(United States) Cary Middlecoff	278	−10	Playoff	(United States) Dave Douglas (United States) Doug Ford	2,400
1950	(United States) Lloyd Mangrum	271	−17	1 stroke	(United States) Jack Burke Jr. (United States) Ed Oliver	2,600
1949	(Australia) Jim Ferrier	277	−11	4 strokes	(United States) Dick Metz	1,000
