= Motor City Open =

Golf tournament formerly on the PGA Tour

Tournament information
- Location: Detroit, Michigan
- Established: 1948
- Course: Knollwood Country Club
- Par: 71
- Tour: PGA Tour
- Format: Stroke play
- Prize fund: US$35,000
- Month played: July
- Final year: 1962

Tournament record score
- Aggregate: 267 Bruce Crampton (1962)
- To par: −17 as above

Final champion
- (Australia) Bruce Crampton
- Location in the United States Location in Michigan

The Motor City Open was a PGA Tour event played at various clubs in and around Detroit, USA, eight times between 1948 and 1962.

The PGA Tour record for the longest sudden-death playoff was established at the 1949 Motor City Open. Cary Middlecoff and Lloyd Mangrum played 11 holes at Meadowbrook Country Club in Northville, Michigan and were still stalemated when darkness arrived. Tournament officials, with their mutual consent, declared them joint winners.

In 1955, the Motor City Open was originally to be played at Meadowbrook Country Club. This was abandoned however, when Meadowbrook's professional, Chick Harbert, won the PGA Championship in 1954. Meadowbrook petitioned for and won the opportunity to host the 1955 PGA Championship and, because of this development, the Motor City Open was not held in 1955. This is the only time that a defending champion of a major championship has hosted the tournament the following year.

In 2019, the Rocket Mortgage Classic at Detroit Golf Club in the city of Detroit replaced The National in the Washington, DC, metropolitan area.

== Tournament hosts ==
- 1948, 1949, 1954, 1959 Meadowbrook Country Club (Northville, Michigan)
- 1950, 1952 Red Run Golf Club (Royal Oak, Michigan)
- 1956 Western Golf and Country Club (Redford, Michigan)
- 1962 Knollwood Country Club (West Bloomfield, Michigan)

== Winners ==
| Year | Winner | Score | To par | Margin of victory | Runner(s)-up |
|---|---|---|---|---|---|
| 1948 | (United States) Ben Hogan | 275 | −9 | Playoff | (United States) Dutch Harrison |
| 1949 | (United States) Lloyd Mangrum (United States) Cary Middlecoff | 273 | −11 | Title shared (Note: Title shared when darkness ended play with Mangrum and Middlecoff still tied after 11 holes of a sudden-death playoff.) | |
| 1950 | (United States) Lloyd Mangrum (2) | 274 | −14 | 1 stroke | (United States) Sam Snead |
1951: No tournament
| 1952 | (United States) Cary Middlecoff (2) | 274 | −14 | Playoff | (United States) Ted Kroll |
1953: No tournament
| 1954 | (United States) Cary Middlecoff (3) | 278 | −6 | 2 strokes | (United States) Tommy Bolt (United States) Marty Furgol (United States) Gene Littler |
| 1956 | (United States) Bob Rosburg | 284 | −4 | Playoff | (United States) Ed Furgol |
1957–58: No tournament
| 1959 | (United States) Mike Souchak | 268 | −16 | 9 strokes | (United States) Billy Casper (United States) Doug Ford |
1960–61: No tournament
| 1962 | (Australia) Bruce Crampton | 267 | −17 | 3 strokes | (United States) Dave Hill (United States) Don Massengale |
