= Cary Middlecoff =

American professional golfer (1921–1998)

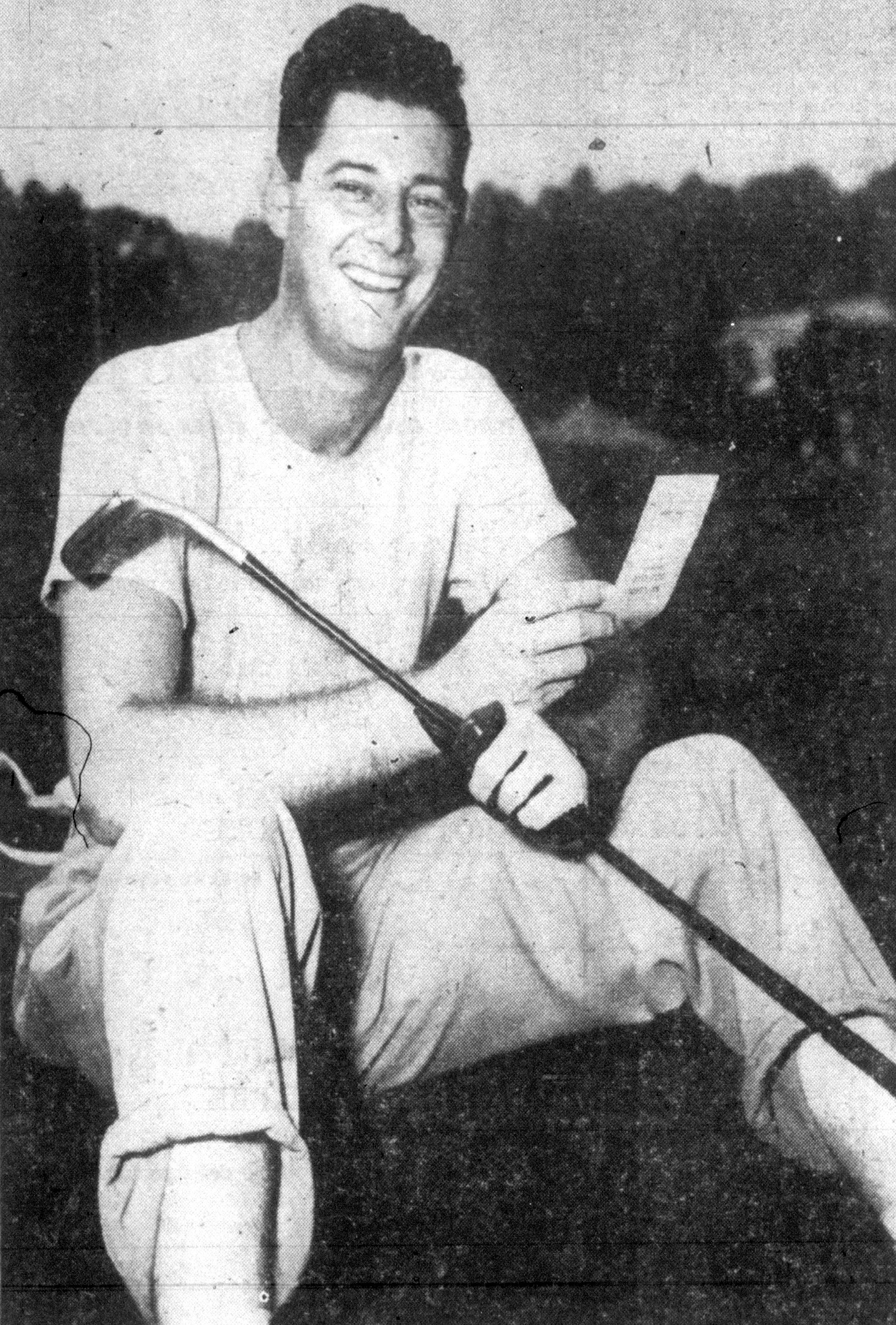
- Middlecoff, circa 1950

Personal information
- Full name: Emmett Cary Middlecoff
- Nickname: Doc
- Nationality: United States
- Born: January 6, 1921 Halls, Tennessee, U.S.
- Died: September 1, 1998 (aged 77) Memphis, Tennessee, U.S.
- Spouse: Edith Buck (m. 1947)

Career
- Sport: Golf
- College: University of Mississippi; University of Tennessee College of Dentistry
- Turned professional: 1947
- Former tour: PGA Tour
- Professional wins: 40

Number of wins by tour
- PGA Tour: 39 (Tied 10th all time)
- Other: 1

Best results in major championships (wins: 3)
- Masters Tournament: Won: 1955
- PGA Championship: 2nd: 1955
- U.S. Open: Won: 1949, 1956
- The Open Championship: 14th: 1957

Achievements and awards
- World Golf Hall of Fame: 1986 (member page)
- Vardon Trophy: 1956

Emmett Cary Middlecoff (January 6, 1921 – September 1, 1998) was an American professional golfer on the PGA Tour from 1947 to 1961. His 39 Tour wins place him tied for tenth all-time, and he won three major championships. Middlecoff graduated as a dentist, but gave up his practice at age 26 to become a full-time Tour golfer.

== Early life and amateur career ==
Middlecoff was born January 6, 1921, in Halls, Tennessee. He graduated from Christian Brothers High School. He played collegiate golf at the University of Mississippi, becoming that school's first golf All-American in 1939. First as an undergraduate and active member of Kappa Alpha Order, then as a dental student at the University of Tennessee, Middlecoff won the Tennessee State Amateur Championship for four straight years (1940–1943). After obtaining his Doctor of Dental Surgery (DDS) degree in 1944, he entered the United States Army Dental Corps during World War II as a dental professional for the United States Army Dental Corps (USADC). He won a PGA Tour tournament as an amateur in 1945

== Professional career ==
In 1947, Middlecoff turned professional. He was selected for the 1947 Walker Cup team but immediately withdrew as he intended turning professional.

During his playing career, Middlecoff won 39 PGA Tour tournaments, including the 1955 Masters and U.S. Open titles in 1949 and 1956. He won the Vardon Trophy for lowest scoring average in 1956.

Middlecoff played on three Ryder Cup teams: 1953, 1955, and 1959 – the U.S. teams won all three times. He was ineligible for the 1957 Ryder Cup because he failed to play in the PGA Championship that year. Middlecoff was disappointed to lose a playoff in the 1957 U.S. Open to Dick Mayer, and played very few events following that event. The U.S. lost the Cup in 1957, for the first time since 1933.

Middlecoff's three best seasons were 1949, 1951 and 1956, as he won six tour titles in each of those years. He won at least one tour tournament in 13 of his 15 seasons, missing only in 1957 and 1960.

During the decade of the 1950s, Middlecoff won 28 tour titles, more than any other player during that span. He was known for often taking excessive time to play his shots.

Back problems and struggles with his nerves during competition ended his career in the early 1960s, when he was in his early 40s, although he continued to play occasionally, competing in the Masters until 1971, as a past champion.

Middlecoff became a top player despite having one leg slightly shorter than the other.

He appeared in two motion pictures as himself (Follow the Sun (1951, about the life and career of Ben Hogan) and The Bellboy (1960)). He wrote a newspaper column, "The Golf Doctor." He also appeared in a short biographical sports documentary Golf Doctor (1947).

Middlecoff later developed a reputation as one of the best of the early golf television commentators. After retiring from the tour, he spent 18 years as a golf analyst for television.

== Death ==
Middlecoff died of heart disease in 1998 in Memphis, Tennessee. He was survived by his wife of 51 years, Edith.

== Awards and honors ==
- In 1956, Middlecoff earned the Vardon Trophy, the honor bestowed to the player with the lowest average score over the course of the season.
- In 1986, Middlecoff was inducted into the World Golf Hall of Fame.

== Professional wins (40) ==
=== PGA Tour wins (39) ===
Legend
Major championships (3)
Other PGA Tour (36)

| No. | Date | Tournament | Winning score | Margin of victory | Runner(s)-up |
|---|---|---|---|---|---|
| 1 | Nov 8, 1945 | North and South Open (as an amateur) | −8 (70-69-69-72=280) | 5 strokes | (United States) Denny Shute |
| 2 | Mar 30, 1947 | Charlotte Open | −11 (70-65-71-71=277) | Playoff | (United States) George Schoux |
| 3 | Mar 9, 1948 | Miami International Four-Ball (with (Australia) Jim Ferrier) | 1 up | | (United States) Ed Furgol and (United States) Ellsworth Vines |
| 4 | Nov 7, 1948 | Hawaiian Open | −10 (70-70-63-71=274) | 3 strokes | (United States) Johnny Bulla |
| 5 | Feb 27, 1949 | Rio Grande Valley Open | −17 (68-66-63-70=267) | 2 strokes | (United States) Bob Hamilton |
| 6 | Mar 13, 1949 | Miami International Four-Ball (2) (with (Australia) Jim Ferrier) | 9 and 8 | | (United States) Skip Alexander and (England) Harry Cooper |
| 7 | Mar 21, 1949 | Jacksonville Open | −14 (66-68-71-69=274) | 2 strokes | (United States) Jerry Barber |
| 8 | Jun 11, 1949 | U.S. Open | +2 (75-67-69-75=286) | 1 stroke | (United States) Clayton Heafner, (United States) Sam Snead |
| 9 | Jun 19, 1949 | Motor City Open | −11 (66-67-71-69=273) | Shared title with (United States) Lloyd Mangrum | |
| 10 | Jul 10, 1949 | Reading Open | −14 (67-68-65-66=266) | 1 stroke | (United States) Sam Snead |
| 11 | Feb 26, 1950 | Houston Open | −11 (71-66-69-71=277) | 3 strokes | (United States) Pete Cooper |
| 12 | Mar 20, 1950 | Jacksonville Open (2) | −9 (70-73-67-69=279) | 2 strokes | (United States) George Fazio |
| 13 | Sep 18, 1950 | St. Louis Open | −10 (71-66-68-65=270) | Playoff | (United States) Ed Oliver |
| 14 | Jan 22, 1951 | Lakewood Park Open | −13 (70-64-69-68=271) | 3 strokes | (United States) Manuel de la Torre |
| 15 | May 27, 1951 | Colonial National Invitation | +2 (69-71-69-73=282) | 1 stroke | (United States) Jack Burke Jr. |
| 16 | Aug 5, 1951 | All American Open | −14 (71-69-66-68=274) | 2 strokes | (United States) Fred Hawkins |
| 17 | Sep 16, 1951 | Eastern Open | −9 (71-68-69-71=279) | 1 stroke | (United States) Jerry Barber |
| 18 | Sep 30, 1951 | St. Louis Open (2) | −15 (65-65-69-70=269) | 2 strokes | (United States) Lloyd Mangrum |
| 19 | Oct 7, 1951 | Kansas City Open | −10 (69-66-72-71=278) | Playoff | (United States) Dave Douglas, (United States) Doug Ford |
| 20 | Feb 10, 1952 | El Paso Open | −15 (65-66-69-69=269) | 3 strokes | (United States) Al Besselink |
| 21 | Jul 6, 1952 | Motor City Open (2) | −14 (69-67-67-71=274) | Playoff | (United States) Ted Kroll |
| 22 | Jul 13, 1952 | St. Paul Open | −22 (65-68-67-66=266) | 5 strokes | (United States) Sam Snead |
| 23 | Aug 17, 1952 | Kansas City Open (2) | −12 (67-68-72-69=276) | Playoff | (United States) Jack Burke Jr. |
| 24 | Mar 1, 1953 | Houston Open (2) | −5 (67-72-72-72=283) | Playoff | (Australia) Jim Ferrier, (United States) Shelley Mayfield, (United States) Bill Nary, (United States) Earl Stewart |
| 25 | May 17, 1953 | Palm Beach Round Robin | +42 points | 7 points | (United States) Jimmy Demaret |
| 26 | Jun 28, 1953 | Carling Open | −13 (68-71-67-69=275) | Playoff | (United States) Ted Kroll |
| 27 | Jul 4, 1954 | Motor City Open (3) | −6 (72-68-70-68=278) | 2 strokes | (United States) Tommy Bolt, (United States) Marty Furgol, (United States) Gene Littler |
| 28 | Jan 16, 1955 | Bing Crosby National Pro-Am Golf Championship | −7 (69-69-71=209) | 4 strokes | (United States) Julius Boros, (United States) Paul McGuire |
| 29 | Mar 20, 1955 | St. Petersburg Open | −14 (68-66-73-67=274) | 2 strokes | (United States) Jay Hebert |
| 30 | Apr 10, 1955 | Masters Tournament | −9 (72-65-72-70=279) | 7 strokes | (United States) Ben Hogan |
| 31 | Jun 26, 1955 | Western Open | −16 (69-70-70-63=272) | 2 strokes | (United States) Mike Souchak |
| 32 | Jul 17, 1955 | Miller High Life Open | −15 (64-67-66-68=265) | 4 strokes | (United States) Julius Boros, (United States) Ted Kroll, (United States) Mike Souchak |
| 33 | Sep 11, 1955 | Cavalcade of Golf | −4 (71-70-70-65=276) | 2 strokes | (United States) Sam Snead |
| 34 | Sep 11, 1956 | Bing Crosby National Pro-Am Golf Championship (2) | −14 (66-68-68=202) | 5 strokes | (United States) Mike Souchak |
| 35 | Feb 5, 1956 | Phoenix Open | −8 (72-66-70-68=276) | 3 strokes | (United States) Mike Souchak |
| 36 | Jun 16, 1956 | U.S. Open (2) | +1 (71-70-70-70=281) | 1 stroke | (United States) Julius Boros, (United States) Ben Hogan |
| 37 | Aug 11, 1958 | Miller Open Invitational (2) | −16 (67-64-66-67=264) | 2 strokes | (United States) Bob Rosburg |
| 38 | Mar 23, 1959 | St. Petersburg Open Invitational (2) | −16 (70-69-67-69=275) | 3 strokes | (United States) Pete Cooper |
| 39 | Jun 4, 1961 | Memphis Open Invitational | −14 (67-68-64-67=266) | 5 strokes | (United States) Gardner Dickinson, (United States) Mike Souchak |

*Mangrum and Middlecoff agreed to share the 1949 Motor City Open after failing light caused play to halt after eleven holes of a playoff.

PGA Tour playoff record (7–6–1)

| No. | Year | Tournament | Opponent(s) | Result |
|---|---|---|---|---|
| 1 | 1947 | Charlotte Open | (United States) George Schoux | Won 18-hole playoff; Middlecoff: −8 (64), Schoux: +1 (73) |
| 2 | 1948 | Tacoma Open Invitational | (United States) Chuck Congdon, (United States) Vic Ghezzi, (United States) Fred Haas, (United States) Ed Oliver | Oliver won with eagle on first extra hole after 18-hole playoff; Oliver: −2 (69), Middlecoff: −2 (69), Haas: +1 (72), Congdon: +2 (73), Ghezzi: +4 (75) |
| 3 | 1949 | Motor City Open | (United States) Lloyd Mangrum | Playoff abandoned after eleven holes due to darkness; tournament shared |
| 4 | 1950 | St. Louis Open | (United States) Ed Oliver | Won with birdie on second extra hole after 18-hole playoff; Middlecoff: −3 (67), Oliver: −3 (67) |
| 5 | 1951 | Kansas City Open | (United States) Dave Douglas, (United States) Doug Ford | Won 18-hole playoff; Middlecoff: −4 (68), Douglas: E (72), Ford: E (72) |
| 6 | 1952 | Motor City Open | (United States) Ted Kroll | Won with birdie on first extra hole |
| 7 | 1952 | World Championship of Golf | (United States) Julius Boros | Lost 18-hole playoff; Boros: −4 (68), Middlecoff: −2 (70) |
| 8 | 1952 | Kansas City Open | (United States) Jack Burke Jr. | Won 18-hole playoff; Middlecoff: −6 (66), Burke: E (72) |
| 9 | 1953 | Houston Open | (Australia) Jim Ferrier, (United States) Shelley Mayfield, (United States) Bill Nary, (United States) Earl Stewart | Won 18-hole playoff; Middlecoff: −3 (69), Ferrier: −1 (71), Mayfield: −1 (71), Stewart: E (72), Nary: +3 (75) |
| 10 | 1953 | Carling Open | (United States) Ted Kroll | Won with par on second extra hole |
| 11 | 1953 | Fort Wayne Open | (United States) Art Wall Jr. | Lost 18-hole playoff; Wall: −2 (70), Middlecoff: E (72) |
| 12 | 1954 | Phoenix Open | (United States) Ed Furgol | Lost to birdie on first extra hole |
| 13 | 1956 | Texas International Open | (United States) Gene Littler, (Australia) Peter Thomson | Thomson won with birdie on second extra hole |
| 14 | 1957 | U.S. Open | (United States) Dick Mayer | Lost 18-hole playoff; Mayer: +2 (72), Middlecoff: +9 (79) |

=== Other wins (1) ===
this list may be incomplete

- 1949 Greenbrier Pro-Am

== Major championships ==
=== Wins (3) ===
| Year | Championship | 54 holes | Winning score | Margin | Runner(s)-up |
|---|---|---|---|---|---|
| 1949 | U.S. Open | 1 shot lead | +2 (75-67-69-75=286) | 1 stroke | (United States) Clayton Heafner, (United States) Sam Snead |
| 1955 | Masters Tournament | 4 shot lead | −9 (72-65-72-70=279) | 7 strokes | (United States) Ben Hogan |
| 1956 | U.S. Open (2) | 1 shot lead | +1 (71-70-70-70=281) | 1 stroke | (United States) Julius Boros, (United States) Ben Hogan |

=== Results timeline ===
| Tournament | 1946 | 1947 | 1948 | 1949 |
|---|---|---|---|---|
| Masters Tournament | T12 LA | T29 | 2 | T23 |
| U.S. Open | | CUT | T21 | 1 |
| The Open Championship | | | | |
| PGA Championship | | | | |

| Tournament | 1950 | 1951 | 1952 | 1953 | 1954 | 1955 | 1956 | 1957 | 1958 | 1959 |
|---|---|---|---|---|---|---|---|---|---|---|
| Masters Tournament | T7 | T12 | 11 | T27 | T9 | 1 | 3 | CUT | T6 | 2 |
| U.S. Open | T10 | T24 | T24 | WD | T11 | T21 | 1 | 2 | T27 | T19 |
| The Open Championship | | | | | | | | 14 | | |
| PGA Championship | | | QF | R32 | SF | 2 | | | T20 | T8 |

| Tournament | 1960 | 1961 | 1962 | 1963 | 1964 | 1965 | 1966 | 1967 | 1968 | 1969 |
|---|---|---|---|---|---|---|---|---|---|---|
| Masters Tournament | CUT | CUT | T29 | CUT | CUT | CUT | WD | CUT | CUT | WD |
| U.S. Open | T43 | CUT | CUT | CUT | | | WD | | | |
| The Open Championship | | | | | | | | | | |
| PGA Championship | T29 | T11 | T15 | | | | | | | |

| Tournament | 1970 | 1971 |
|---|---|---|
| Masters Tournament | CUT | WD |
| U.S. Open | | |
| The Open Championship | | |
| PGA Championship | | |

Win
Top 10
Did not play

LA = low amateur
CUT = missed the half-way cut
WD = withdrew
R32, R16, QF, SF = Round in which player lost in PGA Championship match play
"T" = tied

=== Summary ===
| Tournament | Wins | 2nd | 3rd | Top-5 | Top-10 | Top-25 | Events | Cuts made |
|---|---|---|---|---|---|---|---|---|
| Masters Tournament | 1 | 2 | 1 | 4 | 7 | 11 | 26 | 14 |
| U.S. Open | 2 | 1 | 0 | 3 | 4 | 10 | 18 | 12 |
| The Open Championship | 0 | 0 | 0 | 0 | 0 | 1 | 1 | 1 |
| PGA Championship | 0 | 1 | 1 | 3 | 4 | 8 | 9 | 9 |
| Totals | 3 | 4 | 2 | 10 | 15 | 30 | 54 | 36 |

- Most consecutive cuts made – 12 (1948 Masters – 1953 Masters)
- Longest streak of top-10s – 3 (twice)

== U.S. national team appearances ==
Professional

- Ryder Cup: 1953 (winners), 1955 (winners), 1959 (winners)
- Canada Cup: 1959
- Hopkins Trophy: 1952 (winners), 1955 (winners), 1956 (winners)

== See also ==
- List of golfers with most PGA Tour wins
