= Virginia Beach Open (PGA Tour event) =

Golf tournament formerly on the PGA Tour

The Virginia Beach Open was a golf tournament on the PGA Tour. It was played annually from 1953 to 1955 at the Cavalier Yacht & Country Club in Virginia Beach, Virginia.

== Winners ==
Year	Player	Country	Score	To par	Margin of victory	Runner-up	Winner's share ($)	Ref
1955	Chandler Harper	United States	260	−16	4 strokes	(United States) Dick Mayer	2,400	
1954	Pete Cooper	United States	263	−13	1 stroke	(United States) Tommy Bolt	2,400	
1953	Doug Ford	United States	262	−14	2 strokes	(United States) Ansel Snow	2,000	
