= Labatt Open =

Golf tournament formerly on the PGA Tour

The Labatt Open was a golf event on the PGA Tour that was played in Canada from 1953 to 1957. It was sponsored by the Labatt Brewing Company, and played at several different venues. It was canceled after the 1957 season when suitable dates in 1958 could not be agreed.

Billy Casper won the first of his 51 PGA Tour wins at this event in 1956.

== Tournament hosts ==
- 1953 Summerlea Golf & Country Club, Vaudreuil-Dorion, Quebec
- 1954 Scarboro Golf & Country Club, Scarborough, Ontario
- 1955 Summerlea Golf & Country Club, Vaudreuil-Dorion, Quebec
- 1956 Royal Quebec Golf Club, Boischatel, Quebec
- 1957 Islesmere Golf & Country Club, Sainte-Dorothée, Quebec

== Winners ==
Year	Player	Country	Score	To par	Margin of victory	Runner(s)-up	Winner's share ($)	Ref
1953	Doug Ford	United States	265	−15	5 strokes	(United States) Walter Burkemo	5,000	
1954	Bud Holscher	United States	269	−15	4 strokes	(United States) Doug Ford (United States) Dick Mayer	5,000	
1955	Gene Littler	United States	272	−8	Playoff	(Canada) Stan Leonard	5,000	
1956	Billy Casper	United States	274	−14	2 strokes	(United States) Jimmy Demaret	5,000	
1957	Paul Harney	United States	278	−10	3 strokes	(United States) George Bayer	3,500	
