= Bud Holscher =

America professional golfer (born 1930)

Personal information
- Full name: Frank Soldan Holscher
- Nickname: Bud
- Nationality: United States
- Born: December 27, 1930 Santa Monica, California, U.S.

Career
- Sport: Golf
- College: Santa Monica Junior College
- Turned professional: 1953
- Former tour: PGA Tour
- Professional wins: 5

Number of wins by tour
- PGA Tour: 1
- Other: 4

Best results in major championships
- Masters Tournament: T46: 1954
- PGA Championship: T39: 1960
- U.S. Open: T7: 1955
- The Open Championship: DNP

Frank Soldan "Bud" Holscher (born December 27, 1930) is an American former professional golfer who played on the PGA Tour. He won the 1954 Labatt Open.

== Early life and amateur career ==
Holscher was born on December 27, 1930, in Santa Monica, California. He attended Santa Monica Junior College, where he was a member of the golf team. He won the 1950 California State Junior College Championship.

== Professional career ==
Holscher turned professional in mid-1953, while in the navy, and became eligible for prize money in PGA events from the start of 1954. In the first event of 1954, the Los Angeles Open, he finished tied for 4th place and won $1,075. In August he won the Labatt Open at Scarboro Golf and Country Club, Toronto. He trailed Wally Ulrich by 7 strokes after three rounds but won after a final round of 63, finishing 4 strokes ahead of Doug Ford and Dick Mayer. In November, he won the Hawaiian Open, a non-tour event, by 5 strokes from Tommy Bolt.

In February 1955, Holscher led the Tucson Open after three rounds but Tommy Bolt won after a last round 65, leaving Holscher tied with Art Wall Jr. as runners-up. In 1955 he also had his best finish in a major championship, tied for 7th at the U.S. Open, and was runner-up in the British Columbia Open two weeks later. In June 1956, he finished runner-up in the Philadelphia Daily News Open after losing at the second hole of a sudden-playoff to Dick Mayer.

== Professional wins (5) ==
=== PGA Tour wins (1) ===
No.	Date	Tournament	Winning score	Margin of victory	Runners-up
1	Aug 28, 1954	Labatt Open	−15 (69-67-70-63=269)	4 strokes	(United States) Doug Ford, (United States) Dick Mayer

PGA Tour playoff record (0–1)

No.	Year	Tournament	Opponent	Result
1	1956	Philadelphia Daily News Open	(United States) Dick Mayer	Lost to par on second extra hole

=== Other wins (4) ===
- 1954 Hawaiian Open
- 1960 California State Open, Southern California PGA Championship
- 1965 California State Open

== Results in major championships ==
Tournament	1954	1955	1956	1957	1958	1959	1960	1961	1962	1963	1964	1965	1966
Masters Tournament	T46		T49										
U.S. Open		T7	CUT							CUT			
PGA Championship							T39	T43	CUT			CUT	CUT

Note: Holscher never played in The Open Championship.

Top 10
Did not play

CUT = missed the half-way cut
"T" indicates a tie for a place
