= Ted Kroll =

American professional golfer

Personal information
- Full name: Ted J. Kroll
- Nationality: United States
- Born: August 4, 1919 New Hartford, New York, U.S.
- Died: April 23, 2002 (aged 82) Boca Raton, Florida, U.S.
- Height: 5 ft 8.5 in (1.74 m)
- Weight: 160 lb (73 kg; 11 st)

Career
- Sport: Golf
- Turned professional: 1939
- Former tours: PGA Tour; Champions Tour
- Professional wins: 11

Number of wins by tour
- PGA Tour: 8
- Other: 3

Best results in major championships
- Masters Tournament: 7th: 1953
- PGA Championship: 2nd: 1956
- U.S. Open: T3: 1960
- The Open Championship: DNP

Achievements and awards
- PGA Tour leading money winner: 1956

Ted J. Kroll (August 4, 1919 – April 23, 2002) was an American professional golfer.

== Early life ==
Kroll was born in New Hartford, New York. He served in the United States Army during World War II, from January 1942 to November 1945, and earned three Purple Hearts after being wounded four times.

== Professional career ==
Shortly after the war, he took a job as assistant professional at Philmont Country Club in Huntingdon Valley, Pennsylvania. He began a 34-year PGA Tour career in 1949. He won eight times on the tour, including three wins in 1956, when he topped the money list with earnings of $72,836. That same year he lost the final of the PGA Championship to Jack Burke Jr., 3 and 2.

In 1954, Kroll became the third player in PGA Tour history to shoot a 60, joining Al Brosch (1951) and Bill Nary (1952). He had nines of 30-30 at Brackenridge Park Golf Course during the third round of the Texas Open. His 11-under score vaulted him into a tie for sixth going into the final round, where he shot a 2-under 69 over his final 18 holes to tie for ninth.

Kroll played on three Ryder Cup teams: 1953, 1955, and 1957, compiling a 3–1 record.

== Personal life ==
Kroll was married for over 50 years and had four daughters.

In his later years he suffered from Parkinson's disease. He died in Boca Raton, Florida, and is buried in Florida National Cemetery in Bushnell, Florida.

== Professional wins (11) ==
=== PGA Tour wins (8) ===
| No. | Date | Tournament | Winning score | Margin of victory | Runner(s)-up |
|---|---|---|---|---|---|
| 1 | Jan 20, 1952 | San Diego Open | −12 (65-69-72-70=276) | 3 strokes | (United States) Jimmy Demaret |
| 2 | Sep 1, 1952 | Insurance City Open | −11 (69-70-67-67=273) | 4 strokes | (United States) Lawson Little, (United States) Skee Riegel, (United States) Earl Stewart |
| 3 | Sep 7, 1953 | National Celebrities Open | −7 (70-69-71-71=281) | 1 stroke | (United States) Lew Worsham |
| 4 | Sep 18, 1955 | Philadelphia Daily News Open | +1 (68-72-66-67=273) | Playoff | (United States) Doug Ford |
| 5 | Feb 12, 1956 | Tucson Open Invitational | −16 (65-68-66-65=264) | 3 strokes | (United States) Dow Finsterwald |
| 6 | Feb 26, 1956 | Houston Open | −11 (70-67-71-69=277) | 3 strokes | (United States) Jack Burke Jr., (United States) Dave Douglas |
| 7 | Aug 12, 1956 | World Championship of Golf | −15 (67-69-71-66=273) | 3 strokes | (United States) Fred Hawkins |
| 8 | Jul 29, 1962 | Canadian Open | −10 (71-68-69-70=278) | 2 strokes | (United States) Charlie Sifford |

PGA Tour playoff record (1–7)

| No. | Year | Tournament | Opponent(s) | Result |
|---|---|---|---|---|
| 1 | 1952 | Motor City Open | (United States) Cary Middlecoff | Lost to birdie on first extra hole |
| 2 | 1953 | El Paso Open | (United States) Chandler Harper | Lost 18-hole playoff; Harper: −1 (70), Kroll: +2 (73) |
| 3 | 1953 | Carling Open | (United States) Cary Middlecoff | Lost to par on second extra hole |
| 4 | 1954 | Western Open | (United States) Lloyd Mangrum | Lost to par on first extra hole |
| 5 | 1955 | Philadelphia Daily News Open | (United States) Doug Ford | Won with birdie on first extra hole |
| 6 | 1956 | Insurance City Open | (United States) Arnold Palmer | Lost to birdie on second extra hole |
| 7 | 1960 | Dallas Open Invitational | (United States) Johnny Pott, (United States) Bo Wininger | Pott won with birdie on third extra hole Wininger eliminated by par on first hole |
| 8 | 1961 | Insurance City Open | (United States) Billy Maxwell | Lost to birdie on seventh extra hole |

=== Other wins (3) ===
- 1952 Miami Beach International Four-Ball (with Lew Worsham)
- 1964 Michigan PGA Championship
- 1972 Florida Open

== Results in major championships ==
| Tournament | 1941 | 1942 | 1943 | 1944 | 1945 | 1946 | 1947 | 1948 | 1949 |
|---|---|---|---|---|---|---|---|---|---|
| Masters Tournament | | | NT | NT | NT | | | | |
| U.S. Open | CUT | NT | NT | NT | NT | | | | |
| PGA Championship | | | NT | | | | | | |

| Tournament | 1950 | 1951 | 1952 | 1953 | 1954 | 1955 | 1956 | 1957 | 1958 | 1959 |
|---|---|---|---|---|---|---|---|---|---|---|
| Masters Tournament | | T25 | T14 | 7 | T51 | | T51 | CUT | T23 | T14 |
| U.S. Open | T25 | | T7 | T7 | T27 | CUT | T4 | CUT | | T11 |
| PGA Championship | R16 | R64 | SF | R64 | R16 | R32 | 2 | R16 | T20 | T25 |

| Tournament | 1960 | 1961 | 1962 | 1963 | 1964 | 1965 | 1966 | 1967 |
|---|---|---|---|---|---|---|---|---|
| Masters Tournament | T13 | T24 | T25 | | | | | |
| U.S. Open | T3 | T27 | | CUT | | T24 | | T48 |
| PGA Championship | T12 | 4 | T30 | T59 | T23 | T63 | | |

Note: Kroll never played in The Open Championship.

Top 10
Did not play

NT = no tournament
CUT = missed the half-way cut
R64, R32, R16, QF, SF = Round in which player lost in PGA Championship match play
"T" indicates a tie for a place

=== Summary ===
| Tournament | Wins | 2nd | 3rd | Top-5 | Top-10 | Top-25 | Events | Cuts made |
|---|---|---|---|---|---|---|---|---|
| Masters Tournament | 0 | 0 | 0 | 0 | 1 | 8 | 11 | 10 |
| U.S. Open | 0 | 0 | 1 | 2 | 4 | 7 | 14 | 10 |
| The Open Championship | 0 | 0 | 0 | 0 | 0 | 0 | 0 | 0 |
| PGA Championship | 0 | 1 | 1 | 3 | 6 | 11 | 16 | 16 |
| Totals | 0 | 1 | 2 | 5 | 11 | 26 | 41 | 36 |

- Most consecutive cuts made – 14 (1957 PGA – 1962 PGA)
- Longest streak of top-10s – 4 (1952 U.S. Open – 1953 U.S. Open)

== U.S. national team appearances ==
- Ryder Cup: 1953 (winners), 1955 (winners), 1957
- Hopkins Trophy: 1952 (winners), 1953 (winners), 1954 (winners), 1956 (winners)
