= Larry Nabholtz =

American golfer

Personal information
- Full name: Laurence Nicholas Nabholtz
- Nationality: United States
- Born: February 18, 1901 Sharon, Pennsylvania, U.S.
- Died: October 2, 1987 (aged 86) Dallas, Texas, U.S.

Career
- Sport: Golf
- Status: Professional
- Professional wins: 2

Number of wins by tour
- PGA Tour: 1
- Other: 1

Best results in major championships
- Masters Tournament: DNP
- PGA Championship: T3: 1924
- U.S. Open: T24: 1927
- The Open Championship: CUT: 1927

Laurence Nicholas Nabholtz (February 18, 1901 – October 2, 1987) was an American professional golfer. He reached the semi-final of the 1924 PGA Championship losing by 1 hole to Jim Barnes. He won the El Paso Open in January 1928.

== Professional wins (2) ==
- 1925 Ohio Open
- 1928 El Paso Open (PGA Tour)

== Results in major championships ==
Tournament	1922	1923	1924	1925	1926	1927	1928	1929
U.S. Open	T53			WD	T39	T24	CUT	T42
The Open Championship						CUT		
PGA Championship	R64		SF		R32			R16

Top 10
Did not play

WD = withdrew
CUT = missed the half-way cut
R64, R32, R16, QF, SF = round in which player lost in PGA Championship match play
"T" indicates a tie for a place
