= Philadelphia Daily News Open =

Golf tournament

The Philadelphia Daily News Open was a golf tournament on the PGA Tour that was played in 1955 and 1956 at Cobbs Creek Golf Club in Philadelphia.

The PGA Tour returned to Philadelphia in September 1955, six years after the last Philadelphia Inquirer Open had been played. The 1955 event was won by Ted Kroll at the first hole of a sudden-death playoff over Doug Ford when both finished 72 holes with a one-over-par score of 273. The 1956 event was played in June and was won by Dick Mayer at the second-hole of a sudden-death playoff with Bud Holscher. During the two years that the event played, only Mayer and Holscher were under par for 72 holes. Total prize money was $20,000.

== Winners ==
Year	Player	Country	Score	To par	Margin of victory	Runner-up	Winner's share ($)	Ref
1956	Dick Mayer	United States	269	−3	Playoff	(United States) Bud Holscher	3,880	
1955	Ted Kroll	United States	273	+1	Playoff	(United States) Doug Ford	4,000	
