= Dick Mayer =

American professional golfer (1924–1989)

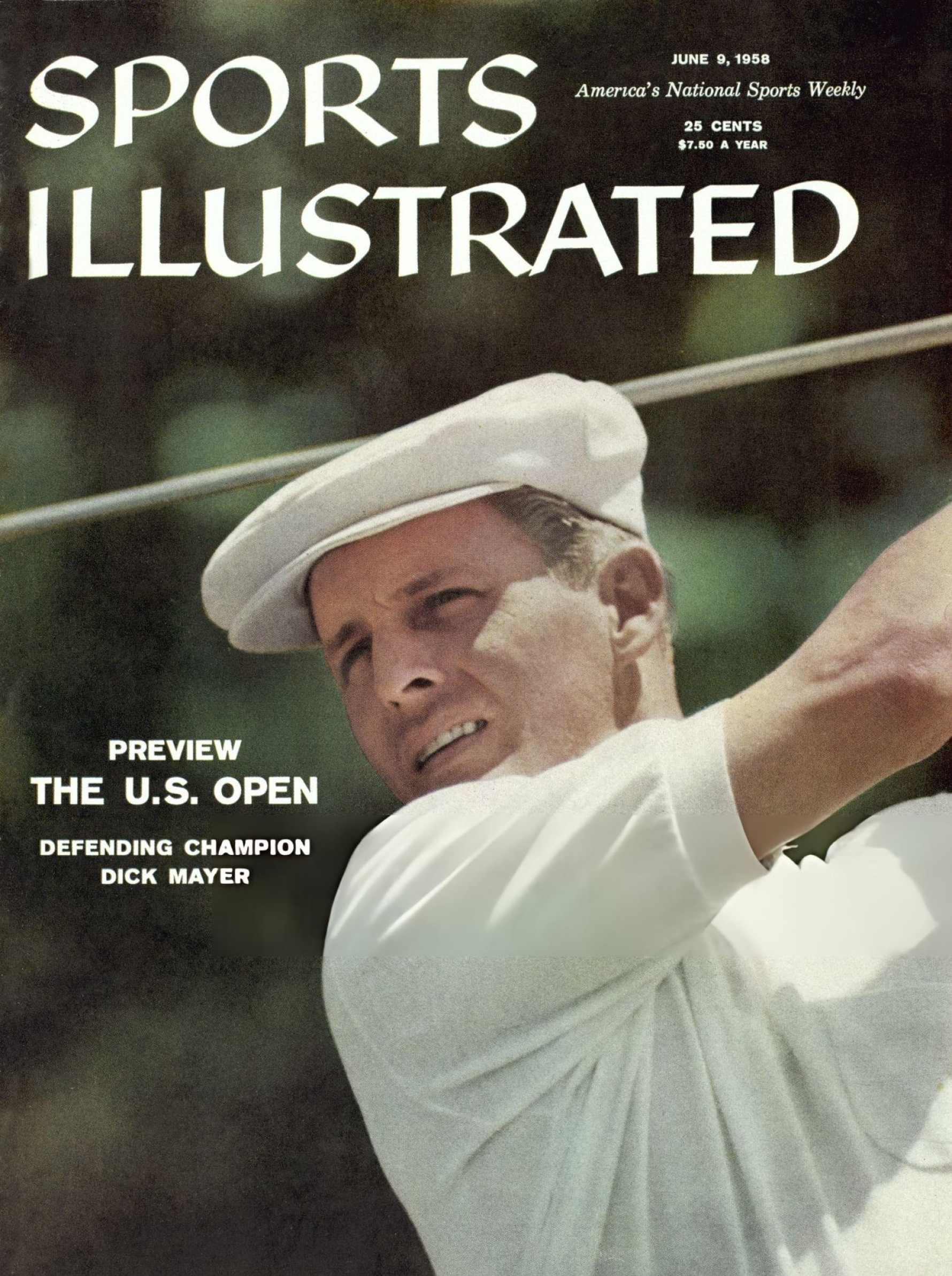
- Mayer on the cover of an issue of Sports Illustrated, cover dated June 9, 1958

Personal information
- Full name: Alvin Richard Mayer
- Nationality: United States
- Born: August 28, 1924 Stamford, Connecticut, U.S.
- Died: June 2, 1989 (aged 64) Palm Springs, California, U.S.
- Height: 5 ft 11 in (1.80 m)
- Weight: 165 lb (75 kg; 11.8 st)

Career
- Sport: Golf
- Turned professional: 1949
- Former tour: PGA Tour
- Professional wins: 7

Number of wins by tour
- PGA Tour: 7

Best results in major championships (wins: 1)
- Masters Tournament: T4: 1959
- PGA Championship: 5th: 1957
- U.S. Open: Won: 1957
- The Open Championship: DNP

Achievements and awards
- PGA Player of the Year: 1957
- PGA Tour leading money winner: 1957

Alvin Richard Mayer (August 28, 1924 – June 2, 1989) was an American professional golfer.

== Early life ==
Mayer was born in Stamford, Connecticut. He apprenticed with renowned player and teacher Claude Harmon at the Winged Foot Golf Club in suburban New York City.

== Professional career ==
Mayer won seven times on the PGA Tour, between 1953 and 1965. Mayer almost won the 1954 U.S. Open, but a triple bogey on the final hole left him tied for third, two shots back, as Ed Furgol won.

Mayer's career year was 1957, when he finished the regulation 72 holes of the U.S. Open at Inverness Club tied with defending champion Cary Middlecoff. He won the 18-hole playoff 72 to 79, and his prize was $7,200. He later won $50,000 at the World Championship of Golf, topped the PGA Tour money list with winnings of $65,835, and won the PGA Player of the Year award. He also played on the 1957 Ryder Cup team.

== Personal life ==
Mayer battled alcoholism, which kept him from winning more often on the Tour. Mayer died at age 64 in Palm Springs, California.

== Awards and honors ==
In 2008, Mayer was inducted into the Connecticut Golf Hall of Fame.

== Professional wins (7) ==
=== PGA Tour wins (7) ===
Legend
Major championships (1)
Other PGA Tour (6)

| No. | Date | Tournament | Winning score | Margin of victory | Runner(s)-up |
|---|---|---|---|---|---|
| 1 | Sep 13, 1953 | Eastern Open | −9 (69-70-70-70=279) | 4 strokes | (United States) Charlie Bassler, (United States) Doug Ford, (United States) Chandler Harper |
| 2 | Mar 21, 1954 | Miami Beach International Four-Ball (with (United States) Tommy Bolt) | −30 (67-61-65-65=258) | Playoff | (United States) Julius Boros and (United States) Dutch Harrison |
| 3 | May 22, 1955 | Kansas City Open | −17 (69-67-68-67=271) | 6 strokes | (United States) Chandler Harper, (United States) Billy Maxwell |
| 4 | Jun 24, 1956 | Philadelphia Daily News Open | −3 (70-65-63-71=269) | Playoff | (United States) Bud Holscher |
| 5 | Jun 16, 1957 | U.S. Open | +2 (70-68-74-70=282) | Playoff | (United States) Cary Middlecoff |
| 6 | Aug 11, 1957 | World Championship of Golf | −9 (72-69-70-68=279) | 1 stroke | (Canada) Al Balding, (United States) Sam Snead |
| 7 | May 16, 1965 | Greater New Orleans Open Invitational | −15 (72-67-66-68=273) | 1 stroke | (Australia) Bruce Devlin, (United States) Billy Martindale |

PGA Tour playoff record (3–1)

| No. | Year | Tournament | Opponent(s) | Result |
|---|---|---|---|---|
| 1 | 1952 | Miami Open | (United States) Jack Burke Jr. | Lost to birdie on fifth extra hole |
| 2 | 1954 | Miami Beach International Four-Ball (with (United States) Tommy Bolt) | (United States) Julius Boros and (United States) Dutch Harrison | Won with birdie on first extra hole |
| 3 | 1956 | Philadelphia Daily News Open | (United States) Bud Holscher | Won with par on second extra hole |
| 4 | 1957 | U.S. Open | (United States) Cary Middlecoff | Won 18-hole playoff; Mayer: +2 (72), Middlecoff: +9 (79) |

== Major championships ==
=== Wins (1) ===
| Year | Championship | 54 holes | Winning score | Margin | Runner-up |
|---|---|---|---|---|---|
| 1957 | U.S. Open | 1 shot deficit | +2 (70-68-74-70=282) | Playoff ^{1} | (United States) Cary Middlecoff |

^{1} Defeated Middlecoff in an 18-hole playoff: Mayer 72 (+2), Middlecoff 79 (+9).

=== Results timeline ===
| Tournament | 1948 | 1949 |
|---|---|---|
| Masters Tournament | | |
| U.S. Open | T41 | |
| PGA Championship | | |

| Tournament | 1950 | 1951 | 1952 | 1953 | 1954 | 1955 | 1956 | 1957 | 1958 | 1959 |
|---|---|---|---|---|---|---|---|---|---|---|
| Masters Tournament | | T25 | | T16 | T29 | T10 | T43 | T35 | CUT | T4 |
| U.S. Open | T12 | CUT | T28 | T54 | T3 | CUT | T41 | 1 | T23 | CUT |
| PGA Championship | | | | | | | R64 | 5 | T14 | CUT |

| Tournament | 1960 | 1961 | 1962 | 1963 | 1964 | 1965 | 1966 | 1967 |
|---|---|---|---|---|---|---|---|---|
| Masters Tournament | | T19 | CUT | T15 | | CUT | CUT | DQ |
| U.S. Open | | T42 | | CUT | | | | |
| PGA Championship | | | | | | CUT | | |

Note: Mayer never played in The Open Championship.

Win
Top 10
Did not play

CUT = missed the half-way cut (3rd round cut in 1959 PGA Championship)
DQ = disqualified
R64, R32, R16, QF, SF = Round in which player lost in PGA Championship match play
"T" = tied

=== Summary ===
| Tournament | Wins | 2nd | 3rd | Top-5 | Top-10 | Top-25 | Events | Cuts made |
|---|---|---|---|---|---|---|---|---|
| Masters Tournament | 0 | 0 | 0 | 1 | 2 | 6 | 14 | 9 |
| U.S. Open | 1 | 0 | 1 | 2 | 2 | 4 | 13 | 9 |
| The Open Championship | 0 | 0 | 0 | 0 | 0 | 0 | 0 | 0 |
| PGA Championship | 0 | 0 | 0 | 1 | 1 | 2 | 5 | 3 |
| Totals | 1 | 0 | 1 | 4 | 5 | 12 | 32 | 21 |

- Most consecutive cuts made – 6 (twice)
- Longest streak of top-10s – 2 (1957 U.S. Open – 1957 PGA)

== U.S. national team appearances ==
- Ryder Cup: 1957
