= El Paso Open (PGA Tour) =

Golf tournament formerly on the PGA Tour

Tournament information
- Location: El Paso, Texas
- Established: 1927
- Course: El Paso Country Club
- Par: 72
- Tour: PGA Tour
- Format: Stroke play
- Prize fund: US$20,000
- Month played: September
- Final year: 1959

Tournament record score
- Aggregate: 269 Cary Middlecoff (1952)
- To par: –15 as above

Final champion
- (United States) Marty Furgol
- Location in the United States Location in Texas

The El Paso Open was a golf tournament on the PGA Tour in the late 1920s and the 1950s. It was played at the El Paso Country Club in El Paso, Texas. In 1929, Bill Mehlhorn won with a score of 271, then a record for a 72-hole tournament.

== Winners ==
Year	Winner	Score	To par	Margin of victory	Runner(s)-up	Ref.
1959	(United States) Marty Furgol	273	−15	4 strokes	(United States) Jay Hebert (United States) Ernie Vossler	
1954–1958: No tournament
1953	(United States) Chandler Harper	278	−6	Playoff	(United States) Ted Kroll	
1952	(United States) Cary Middlecoff	269	−15	3 strokes	(United States) Al Besselink	
1930–1951: No tournament
1929	(United States) Bill Mehlhorn	271	−17	6 strokes	(Scotland) Bobby Cruickshank	
1928	(United States) Larry Nabholtz	293		1 stroke	(Scotland) Macdonald Smith	
1927	(United States) Tommy Armour	288	−4	4 strokes	(United States) Johnny Golden (Australia) Joe Kirkwood Sr.	

== See also ==
- El Paso Open (a Ben Hogan Tour event)
