= Dave Douglas (golfer) =

American golfer (1918–1978)

Personal information
- Full name: David Douglas
- Nationality: United States
- Born: January 1, 1918 Philadelphia, Pennsylvania, U.S.
- Died: November 16, 1978 (aged 60) Rehoboth Beach, Delaware, U.S.
- Height: 6 ft 2 in (1.88 m)
- Weight: 165 lb (75 kg; 11.8 st)

Career
- Sport: Golf
- Status: Professional
- Former tour: PGA Tour
- Professional wins: 8

Number of wins by tour
- PGA Tour: 8

Best results in major championships
- Masters Tournament: 5th: 1951
- PGA Championship: T5: 1950, 1953
- U.S. Open: T6: 1949, 1951
- The Open Championship: DNP

David Douglas (January 1, 1918 – November 16, 1978) was an American professional golfer who played on the PGA Tour in the 1940s and 1950s.

== Early life ==
Douglas was the son of Alec Douglas, a golf professional originally from Scotland. At the time of David's birth Alec was the professional at Aronimink Golf Club in Philadelphia, Pennsylvania. In the early 1920s, Alec became the professional at the newly opened Rock Manor Golf Club in Wilmington, Delaware and remained the professional there until retiring in 1957.

== Professional career ==
In 1939, Douglas turned professional. He was the club professional at the Newark Country Club in Newark, Delaware from 1940 to 1942. He qualified for the 1940 U.S. Open but failed to make the cut. After serving in the army in World War II he became an assistant professional to his father at Rock Manor. At 6' 2" tall and 165 pounds, he was lean and lanky and was known for his smooth swing.

Douglas won eight tournaments on the PGA Tour between 1947 and 1954. He had his first win at the Orlando Open in December 1947. After the 72 holes he was tied on 274 with Jimmy Demaret and Herman Keiser. There was an 18-hole playoff the following day. Douglas and Demaret were again tied on 71 with Keiser taking 73. There was then a sudden-death playoff with Douglas winning with a birdie 3 at the first extra hole.

Douglas was a member of the American 1953 Ryder Cup team. He finished one place out of the qualifying places but with Ben Hogan and Dutch Harrison declining their invitations, he got a place along with Fred Haas. The match was played at the Wentworth Club in England. Douglas played with Ed Oliver in the first-day foursomes, winning 2 & 1. He played against Bernard Hunt in the singles on the second-day. The match was the last to finish. The American team led 6–5 and had retained the cup, but Douglas need to halve his match to give the Americans a clear win. Hunt had won the 12th, 13th, 16th and 17th holes to be dormie-one. At the last, Hunt's second shot was in the trees but he managed to get his third shot to the back of the green. He putted to 4 feet and, with Douglas taking 5, needed to hole the putt to win the match. He missed and so the USA won 6½ to 5½.

In October 1954, Douglas was a late replacement in the Lakes International Cup. Ed Furgol was part of the original American team of four but withdrew because an injured right arm. Australia won the cup for the first time, winning the match 7–5.

In 1957, Douglas became the club professional at St. Louis Country Club in Missouri and played less tournament golf from that date. He left that position in 1974 and moved to Terre du Lac Golf and Country Club, also in Missouri. He was briefly at Wedgewood Country Club, Missouri in 1978.

== Death ==
In November 1978, Douglas died on cancer at Rehoboth Beach, Delaware.

== Awards and honors ==
In 1978, Douglas was inducted into the Delaware Sports Museum and Hall of Fame

== Professional wins (8) ==
=== PGA Tour wins (8) ===
No.	Date	Tournament	Winning score	Margin of victory	Runner(s)-up
1	Dec 8, 1947	Orlando Open	−10 (66-72-70-66=274)	Playoff	(United States) Jimmy Demaret, (United States) Herman Keiser
2	Feb 13, 1949	Texas Open	−16 (65-72-66-65=268)	1 stroke	(United States) Sam Snead
3	Sep 5, 1949	Ozark Open	−16 (68-69-66=203)	3 strokes	(Australia) Jim Ferrier
4	Jan 15, 1950	Bing Crosby Pro-Am	−2 (75-67-72=214)	Shared title with (United States) Jack Burke Jr., (United States) Smiley Quick and (United States) Sam Snead	
5	Apr 14, 1952	Greater Greensboro Open	−7 (73-64-71-69=277)	1 stroke	(South Africa) Bobby Locke
6	Jun 8, 1952	Ardmore Open	−1 (70-68-69-72=279)	2 strokes	(United States) Dutch Harrison
7	Jul 11, 1953	Canadian Open	−11 (68-70-69-66=273)	1 stroke	(United States) Wally Ulrich
8	Mar 7, 1954	Houston Open	−11 (70-71-69-67=277)	2 strokes	(United States) Cary Middlecoff

PGA Tour playoff record (1–1)

No.	Year	Tournament	Opponents	Result
1	1947	Orlando Open	(United States) Jimmy Demaret, (United States) Herman Keiser	Won with birdie on first extra hole after 18-hole playoff; Douglas: E (71), Demaret: E (71), Keiser: + 2 (73)
2	1951	Kansas City Open	(United States) Doug Ford, (United States) Cary Middlecoff	Middlecoff won 18-hole playoff; Middlecoff: −4 (68), Douglas: E (72), Ford: E (72)

== Results in major championships ==
Tournament	1940	1941	1942	1943	1944	1945	1946	1947	1948	1949
Masters Tournament				NT	NT	NT				
U.S. Open	CUT		NT	NT	NT	NT		T39	T45	T6
PGA Championship				NT						R16

Tournament	1950	1951	1952	1953	1954	1955	1956	1957	1958	1959
Masters Tournament	T49	5	T30		T53					
U.S. Open	T36	T6	CUT	CUT		T47	T34	CUT		CUT
PGA Championship	QF	R64	R32	QF	R64	R32			CUT	

Tournament	1960	1961	1962
Masters Tournament			CUT
U.S. Open	T33	T14	T28
PGA Championship			CUT

Note: Douglas never played in The Open Championship.

Top 10
Did not play

NT = no tournament
CUT = missed the half-way cut
R64, R32, R16, QF, SF = round in which player lost in PGA Championship match play
"T" indicates a tie for a place

=== Summary ===
Tournament	Wins	2nd	3rd	Top-5	Top-10	Top-25	Events	Cuts made
Masters Tournament	0	0	0	1	1	1	5	4
U.S. Open	0	0	0	0	2	3	15	10
The Open Championship	0	0	0	0	0	0	0	0
PGA Championship	0	0	0	2	3	5	9	7
Totals	0	0	0	3	6	9	29	21

- Most consecutive cuts made – 11 (1947 U.S. Open – 1952 Masters)
- Longest streak of top-10s – 3 (1950 PGA – 1951 U.S. Open)

== U.S. national team appearances ==
- Ryder Cup: 1953 (winners)
- Hopkins Trophy: 1952 (winners), 1954 (winners)
- Lakes International Cup: 1954 (winners)
