= Hopkins Trophy =

Tournament information
- Established: 1952
- Format: Team match play
- Final year: 1956

Final champion
- United States

The Hopkins Trophy was an annual men's professional team golf competition between teams representing the United States and Canada. It was played from 1952 to 1956. The Americans won all five contests that were played. The matches were sponsored by John Jay Hopkins.

== Format ==
The 1952 event was contested over two days with three 36-hole fourballs on the first day and six 36-hole singles on the final day. Each match involved three points, one for the morning round, one for the afternoon round and a third for the overall result.

The 1953 event was extended to three days with three fourballs on the first day and six singles on the second and third days. Matches were reduced to 18 holes with one point for the winner of each 9 holes and a further point for the winner over all 18 holes. In 1954 there were six singles on the first day, three fourballs on the second day and then two sets of six singles on the final day.

The 1955 match was held in the United States for the first time and was reduced to two days, with six singles on the first day and three fourballs on the second. Bad weather meant that only the first 9 holes of the singles matches were played on the opening day; the matches being completed on the second morning. In 1956 the fourballs were played on the first day with the singles on the final day.

From 1953 to 1956 each match involved teams of seven, with one player being rested for each session. In 1952 teams only had six players. Bill Kerr was the Captain and alternate in the Canadian team. He was originally due to play in the singles in place of Fletcher but later withdrew.

== Results ==
Year	Dates	Venue	Winners	Score	Ref
1952	August 26–27	Beaconsfield GC, Montreal, Canada	United States	20 1/2–6 1/2	
1953	June 5–7	Beaconsfield GC, Montreal, Canada	United States	27–18	
1954	June 10–12	Mississaugua G&CC, Mississauga, Canada	United States	42 1/2–20 1/2	
1955	January 18–19	La Jolla CC, La Jolla, California, US	United States	17–10	
1956	May 7–8	Colonial CC, Fort Worth, Texas, US	United States	21–6	

== Appearances ==
The following are those who played in at least one of the five matches.

=== Canada ===
- Al Balding 1955, 1956
- Dick Borthwick 1953
- Gordie Brydson 1952, 1954, 1955, 1956
- Pat Fletcher 1952, 1953, 1954, 1955
- Stanley Horne 1952
- Jules Huot 1952, 1953, 1954, 1955
- Jack Kay 1956
- Bill Kerr 1953, 1954, 1955, 1956
- Stan Leonard 1952, 1953, 1954, 1955, 1956
- Bobby Locke 1952, 1953, 1954
- Henry Martell 1954, 1955
- Bill Mawhinney 1956
- Peter Thomson 1953
- Murray Tucker 1956

From 1952 to 1954 the Canadian team included one or two non-Canadian guests; the South African, Bobby Locke, and the Australian, Peter Thomson.

=== United States ===
- Jerry Barber 1954, 1955
- Tommy Bolt 1953, 1956
- Julius Boros 1952, 1953
- Jack Burke Jr. 1952, 1953, 1955
- Walter Burkemo 1954
- Dave Douglas 1952, 1954
- Jack Fleck 1956
- Doug Ford 1952, 1953, 1956
- Ed Furgol 1955
- Marty Furgol 1954, 1955
- Chick Harbert 1955
- Chandler Harper 1954
- Ted Kroll 1952, 1953, 1954, 1956
- Gene Littler 1956
- Lloyd Mangrum 1955
- Cary Middlecoff 1952, 1955, 1956
- Ed Oliver 1953, 1954
- Mike Souchak 1956
- Jim Turnesa 1953
