= 1957 U.S. Open (golf) =

Coordinates: 41.652°N 83.651°W

Tournament information
- Dates: June 13–16, 1957
- Location: Toledo, Ohio
- Course: Inverness Club
- Organized by: USGA
- Tour: PGA Tour

Statistics
- Par: 70
- Length: 6,919 yards (6,327 m)
- Field: 157 players, 53 after cut
- Cut: 150 (+10)
- Prize fund: $30,000
- Winner's share: $7,200

Champion
- (United States) Dick Mayer
- 282 (+2), playoff

Location in the United States
Location in Ohio

The 1957 U.S. Open was the 57th U.S. Open, held June 12–15 at Inverness Club in Toledo, Ohio. Dick Mayer defeated defending champion Cary Middlecoff in an 18-hole playoff to win his only major title.

Amateur Billy Joe Patton was the 36-hole co-leader with Mayer, but fell back with consecutive 76s and tied for eighth. The 54-hole lead was held by Jimmy Demaret, age 47, attempting to become the oldest U.S. Open champion. Mayer was a shot back, while Middlecoff, Julius Boros, and Roberto De Vicenzo were two back.

With temperatures soaring in the final round with high humidity, Demaret was five-over through eleven holes. He rebounded with three birdies on the back nine to post a 72 and a 283 total, a shot out of the playoff. Mayer carded a 70 and a 282 total, while Middlecoff birdied the last to force a playoff. The Sunday playoff turned out to be a one-sided affair, as Mayer shot 72 to Middlecoff's 79. Temperatures again approached 100 °F (38 °C) and only one birdie was carded.

This U.S. Open witnessed the debut of 17-year-old amateur Jack Nicklaus, who had consecutive rounds of 80 and missed the cut. It was just the beginning for Nicklaus, as he won a record-tying four U.S. Open titles and a record 18 major championships. While Nicklaus was making his debut, three-time major winner Denny Shute was playing his last Open; he too missed the cut. Two-time champion Gene Sarazen, at 55 in his penultimate Open, also missed the cut. After receiving medical attention for a back ailment, four-time champion and pre-tournament favorite Ben Hogan withdrew prior to his first round on Thursday.

The course was scheduled to play to a length of 6,961 yards (6,365 m), but heavy rains caused several new tee boxes to become unplayable and the course was shortened by about 100 yards (90 m).

This was the third U.S. Open at Inverness, which hosted in 1920 and 1931. The U.S. Open returned in 1979 and the PGA Championship followed in 1986 and 1993.

== Course layout ==
Hole	1	2	3	4	5	6	7	8	9	Out	10	11	12	13	14	15	16	17	18	In	Total
Yards	394	384	175	466	423	385	400	212	466	3,305	400	380	527	167	479	468	412	451	330	3,614	6,919
Par	4	4	3	4	4	4	4	3	4	34	4	4	5	3	4	4	4	4	4	36	70

Lengths of the course for previous major championships:

- 6,529 yards (5,970 m), par 71 - 1931 U.S. Open
- 6,569 yards (6,007 m), par 71 - 1920 U.S. Open

== Round summaries ==
=== First round ===
Thursday, June 13, 1957

Place	Player	Score	To par
1	(United States) Jimmy Demaret	68	−2
T2	(United States) Julius Boros	69	−1
T2	(United States) Doug Ford	69	−1
T2	(United States) Ken Venturi	69	−1
T5	(United States) Billy Maxwell	70	E
T5	(United States) Dick Mayer	70	E
T5	(United States) Billy Joe Patton (a)	70	E
T5	(United States) Bud Ward	70	E
T5	(United States) Bo Wininger	70	E
T10	(United States) Jack Burke Jr.	71	+1
T10	(United States) Cary Middlecoff	71	+1
T10	(United States) Sam Penecale	71	+1
T10	(Australia) Peter Thomson	71	+1
T10	(United States) Don Whitt	71	+1

=== Second round ===
Friday, June 14, 1957

Place	Player	Score	To par
T1	(United States) Dick Mayer	70-68=138	−2
T1	(United States) Billy Joe Patton (a)	70-68=138	−2
T3	(United States) Doug Ford	69-71=140	E
T3	(United States) Ken Venturi	69-71=140	E
T5	(United States) Jimmy Demaret	68-73=141	+1
T5	(United States) Bo Wininger	70-71=141	+1
7	(Argentina) Roberto De Vicenzo	72-70=142	+2
8	(Australia) Peter Thomson	71-72=143	+3
T9	(United States) Julius Boros	69-75=144	+4
T9	(United States) Fred Hawkins	72-72=144	+4
T9	(United States) Sam Penecale	71-73=144	+4
T9	(United States) Bud Ward	70-74=144	+4

=== Third round ===
Saturday, June 15, 1957 (morning)

Place	Player	Score	To par
1	(United States) Jimmy Demaret	68-73-70=211	+1
2	(United States) Dick Mayer	70-68-74=212	+2
T3	(United States) Julius Boros	69-75-70=214	+4
T3	(Argentina) Roberto De Vicenzo	72-70-72=214	+4
T3	(United States) Cary Middlecoff	71-75-68=214	+4
T3	(United States) Billy Joe Patton (a)	70-68-76=214	+4
T3	(United States) Bud Ward	70-74-70=214	+4
T8	(United States) Fred Hawkins	72-72-71=215	+5
T8	(United States) Ken Venturi	69-71-75=215	+5
10	(United States) Mike Fetchick	74-71-71=216	+6

=== Final round ===
Saturday, June 15, 1957 (afternoon)

Place	Player	Score	To par	Money ($)
T1	(United States) Dick Mayer	70-68-74-70=282	+2	Playoff
T1	(United States) Cary Middlecoff	71-75-68-68=282	+2	Playoff
3	(United States) Jimmy Demaret	68-73-70-72=283	+3	2,160
T4	(United States) Julius Boros	69-75-70-70=284	+4	1,380
T4	(United States) Walter Burkemo	74-73-72-65=284	+4	1,380
T6	(United States) Fred Hawkins	72-72-71-71=286	+6	840
T6	(United States) Ken Venturi	69-71-75-71=286	+6	840
T8	(Argentina) Roberto De Vicenzo	72-70-72-76=290	+10	465
T8	(United States) Chick Harbert	68-79-71-72=290	+10	465
T8	(United States) Billy Maxwell	70-76-72-72=290	+10	465
T8	(United States) Sam Snead	74-74-69-73=290	+10	465
T8	(United States) Billy Joe Patton (a)	70-68-76-76=290	+10	0

(a) denotes amateur

=== Playoff ===
Sunday, June 16, 1957

Place	Player	Score	To par	Money ($)
1	(United States) Dick Mayer	72	+2	7,200
2	(United States) Cary Middlecoff	79	+9	4,200

==== Scorecard ====
Hole	1	2	3	4	5	6	7	8	9	10	11	12	13	14	15	16	17	18
Par	4	4	3	4	4	4	4	3	4	4	4	5	3	4	4	4	4	4
(United States) Mayer	E	+1	+1	+1	+1	E	E	E	+1	+1	+1	+1	+1	+1	+2	+2	+2	+2
(United States) Middlecoff	+1	+1	+1	+1	+2	+2	+3	+4	+4	+6	+6	+6	+6	+6	+8	+8	+9	+9

Cumulative playoff scores, relative to par

Birdie	Bogey	Double bogey
