= Marty Furgol =

American professional golfer (1916–2005)

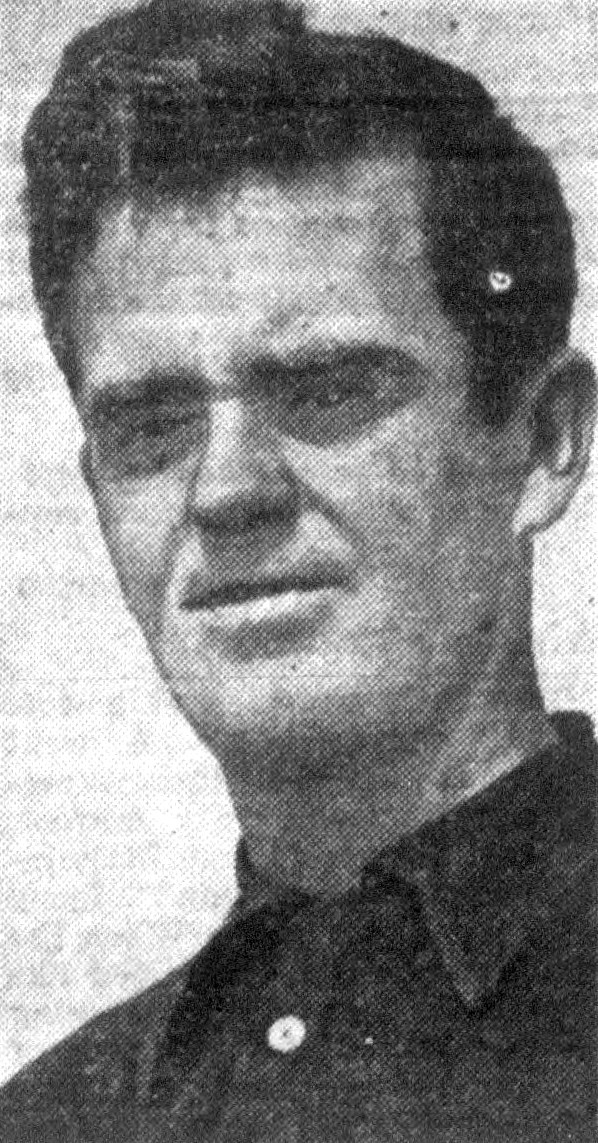
- Furgol, circa 1951

Personal information
- Full name: Martin A. Furgol
- Nationality: United States
- Born: January 5, 1916 New York Mills, New York, U.S.
- Died: November 23, 2005 (aged 89) Florida, U.S.

Career
- Sport: Golf
- Turned professional: 1937
- Former tours: PGA Tour; Champions Tour
- Professional wins: 6

Number of wins by tour
- PGA Tour: 5
- Other: 1

Best results in major championships
- Masters Tournament: T11: 1957
- PGA Championship: T9: 1949, 1955
- U.S. Open: T9: 1953
- The Open Championship: DNP

Martin A. Furgol (January 5, 1916 – November 23, 2005) was an American professional golfer.

== Career ==
He won five times on the PGA Tour in the 1950s. He played on the 1955 Ryder Cup team. He was born in New York Mills, New York and died in Florida. Although he was from the same town as golfer Ed Furgol, they are not related.

== Professional wins (6) ==
=== PGA Tour wins (5) ===
No.	Date	Tournament	Winning score	Margin of victory	Runner(s)-up
1	Feb 25, 1951	Houston Open	−11 (69-67-72-69=277)	1 stroke	(United States) Jack Burke Jr.
2	Jul 15, 1951	Western Open	−10 (68-68-69-65=270)	1 stroke	(United States) Cary Middlecoff
3	Sep 26, 1954	National Celebrities Open	−11 (68-68-68-69=273)	1 stroke	(United States) Bo Wininger
4	Feb 1, 1959	San Diego Open Invitational	−14 (70-71-64-69=274)	1 stroke	(United States) Joe Campbell, (United States) Billy Casper, (United States) Dave Ragan, (United States) Mike Souchak, (United States) Bo Wininger
5	Sep 20, 1959	El Paso Open	−15 (73-69-66-65=273)	4 strokes	(United States) Jay Hebert, (United States) Ernie Vossler

PGA Tour playoff record (0–1)

No.	Year	Tournament	Opponent	Result
1	1954	Greater Greensboro Open	(United States) Doug Ford	Lost 18-hole playoff; Ford: +1 (72), Furgol: +4 (75)

=== Other wins (1) ===
this list may be incomplete

- 1970 Philadelphia PGA Championship

== U.S. national team appearances ==
- Ryder Cup: 1955 (winners)
- Hopkins Trophy: 1954 (winners), 1955 (winners)
- Lakes International Cup: 1954 (winners)
