= Ed Oliver (golfer) =

American professional golfer (1915–1961)

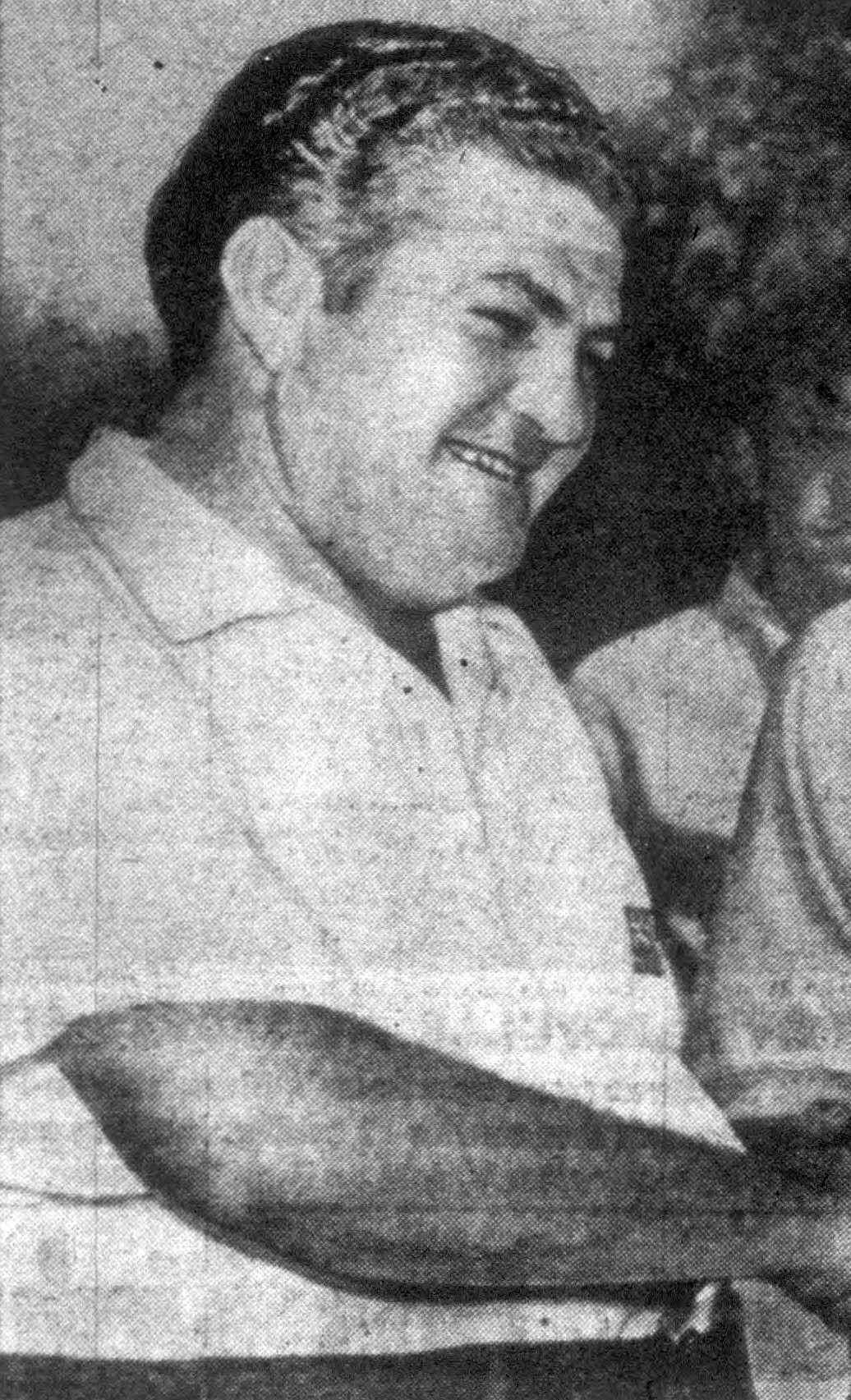
- Oliver in 1953

Personal information
- Full name: Edward Stewart Oliver, Jr.
- Nicknames: Porky, Pork Chops
- Nationality: United States
- Born: September 6, 1915 Wilmington, Delaware, U.S.
- Died: September 21, 1961 (aged 46) Wilmington, Delaware, U.S.
- Height: 5 ft 9 in (1.75 m)
- Weight: 240 lb (109 kg; 17 st)
- Spouse: Clara E. Hee
- Children: 3 sons, 1 daughter

Career
- Sport: Golf
- College: none
- Turned professional: 1940
- Former tour: PGA Tour
- Professional wins: 15

Number of wins by tour
- PGA Tour: 8
- Other: 7

Best results in major championships
- Masters Tournament: 2nd: 1953
- PGA Championship: 2nd: 1946
- U.S. Open: 2nd: 1952
- The Open Championship: DNP

Edward Stewart "Porky" Oliver, Jr. (September 6, 1915 – September 21, 1961) was an American professional golfer. He played on what is now known as the PGA Tour in the 1940s and 1950s.

== Early life ==
Oliver was born in Wilmington, Delaware. He started as a caddie at age 11 at the Dupont Country Club. He was later recruited to Wilmington Country Club where he led his team to the Philadelphia caddie championship title. He turned pro at the age of 19.

As a youth his friends called him "Snowball" due to his accuracy throwing snowballs. He was an excellent all-around athlete and led his high school baseball team to a championship while averaging 14 strikeouts a game. After joining the golf circuit Oliver put on weight and eventually picked up the nickname "Porky." He said the name came courtesy of his friend Sam Snead. At 5 ft 9 in (1.75 m) his weight ranged from 215 to 240 pounds (109 kg) during his career.

== Professional career ==
At the age of 19, Oliver turned pro. He won eight times on the PGA Tour in the 1940s and 1950s. Oliver was well known for finishing second in several major championships but not letting it get him down. He lost to Ben Hogan in the finals of the 1946 PGA Championship, was runner-up to Julius Boros in the 1952 U.S. Open, and to Hogan at the 1953 Masters. Oliver seemed to have a knack of playing his best golf against the greatest players. He defeated Ben Hogan in San Francisco and Phoenix in 1940 and at the 1941 Western Open. Oliver defeated Hogan again in late 1945 at the Durham Jaycee Open but suffered high profile losses to him in later years. Not long after expressing his concern over playing with Hogan at the 1951 the Colonial which ended badly for him, he faced him in the final group at the 1952 U.S. Open. It turned out to be one of Oliver's greatest performances as he came from five behind golf's leading man over the final 36 holes in the Texas heat. Unfortunately he could not overcome the lead of Julius Boros who took the title while Oliver finished second.

Oliver had a couple big wins against Byron Nelson including their 36 hole quarterfinal match in the 1946 PGA after which Nelson went into retirement. He also defeated Sam Snead to win the 1956 White Sulfur Springs Open. When South African Bobby Locke dominated the US tour in 1947, he defeated Oliver in a playoff at the All American Open and passed him for the win at the Canadian Open after Oliver broke the tournament scoring record. They finished in a tie for third at the 1946 US Open. Before being sidelined with cancer Oliver collected 145 top ten finishes, including 22 seconds and 17 thirds.

In 1940 Oliver finished in a tie with Lawson Little and Gene Sarazen at the 1940 U.S. Open, but in a highly controversial decision was disqualified for teeing off 30 minutes early over weather concerns (under current rules, tournament directors reserve the rule to advance round start times, group players in three, and using both the first and tenth tees in case of approaching weather). Bobby Jones called it, "the most unfortunate golfing occasion of which I have ever heard." Later that same year, Oliver played a series of exhibitions with Gene Sarazen sponsored by Golf Magazine. He was the medalist in the stroke play qualifier of the PGA Championship in 1954, but lost in the third round to eventual champion Chick Harbert. Because of his positive attitude, Oliver was a popular player on tour. Ken Venturi called him, "the greatest ambassador to golf who ever played."

Oliver played on three Ryder Cup teams (1947, 1951, and 1953). In the 1953 matches at Wentworth, England, he teamed with his boyhood friend Dave Douglas (the only other golfer from Delaware to win on the PGA Tour) to defeat Peter Allis and Harry Weetman. That single point would prove the margin of victory for the US team. Oliver lost four and a half years during his prime (age 25 - 30) while serving in the U.S. Army during World War II. He was also involved in several serious car accidents, including one that took the life of a fellow passenger when they were returning from the Tucson Open. The driver was Oliver's friend and 1952 PGA Championship, Jim Turnesa. On the way to the Los Angeles Open in 1949 his car was rear-ended by a lumber truck in Oregon. He suffered from the after effects of his injuries for much of the balance of his career. To spend more time with his family and gain a regular paycheck, he held head professional positions at Hornell, New York, Kenmore, Washington, and at Blue Hill Country Club in Canton, Massachusetts. These positions also greatly restricted his time on the tour.

== Death ==
Two weeks after finishing ninth in the 1960 Houston Open, Oliver was diagnosed with cancer and had part of a lung removed in late May in Denver. Remarkably, he played a tour event that September in Utah, but missed the cut by two strokes.

Oliver was an advocate for cancer research, traveling the banquet circuit while battling the disease. Numerous golf tournaments and fundraisers were held in his honor. Presidents Kennedy and Eisenhower, Bob Hope, Bing Crosby, Ed Sullivan and many more joined a national committee to raise funds for his family and to fight cancer. In August 1961 the PGA named him the "Honorary Captain" of that year's Ryder Cup Team. He died in September at age 46 at Memorial Hospital in Wilmington, Delaware, less than a month before the matches.

He and his wife Clara (1915–2010) are buried in All Saints Cemetery in Wilmington; they had three sons and a daughter.

== Awards and honors ==
- Oliver was inducted into the Delaware Sports Hall of Fame in 1976.
- The course of the Wilmington Country Club where he caddied as a teenager has been redesigned and is now the Ed Oliver Golf Club.
- During the 2022 BMW Championship, held at Wilmington, Delaware, Oliver was inducted by the Western Golf Association into the Caddie Hall of Fame.

== Professional wins ==
=== PGA Tour wins (8) ===
- 1940 (3) Bing Crosby Pro-Am, Phoenix Open, St. Paul Open
- 1941 (1) Western Open
- 1947 (1) San Antonio Texas Open
- 1948 (1) Tacoma Open Invitational
- 1953 (1) Kansas City Open
- 1958 (1) Houston Open

=== Other wins ===
this list may be incomplete

- 1936 Central Pennsylvania Open
- 1937 Wood Memorial
- 1938 South Jersey Open, Central Pennsylvania Open
- 1939 Buffalo Open
- 1940 Buffalo Open
- 1940 Mid-South Better-Ball Championship (partnered with Clayton Heafner)
- 1945 Delaware Open
- 1948 Pacific Northwest PGA Championship
- 1949 Northwest Open, Philippine World Open, Washington State PGA Championship, Idaho Open, Esmeralda Open, Goodwill Open
- 1954 Wood Memorial
- 1956 Massachusetts Open, White Sulphur Open
- 1959 Jamaica Open, Montana Open, Lake Tahoe Pro-Am

== Results in major championships ==
Tournament	1939	1940	1941	1942	1943	1944	1945	1946	1947	1948	1949
Masters Tournament		T19			NT	NT	NT	T37	T8		
U.S. Open	T29	DQ		NT	NT	NT	NT	T6	T3	CUT	
PGA Championship					NT			2	R16	R16	R64

Tournament	1950	1951	1952	1953	1954	1955	1956	1957	1958	1959	1960
Masters Tournament			T30	2	T22	T53				T14	T20
U.S. Open		T24	2	T58		CUT	T41	T22			
PGA Championship		R32		R64	R16	R64			T8	T11	

Note: Oliver never played in The Open Championship.

Top 10
Did not play

NT = no tournament
DQ = disqualified
CUT = missed the half-way cut
R64, R32, R16, QF, SF = Round in which player lost in PGA Championship match play
"T" indicates a tie for a place

=== Summary ===
Tournament	Wins	2nd	3rd	Top-5	Top-10	Top-25	Events	Cuts made
Masters Tournament	0	1	0	1	2	6	9	9
U.S. Open	0	1	1	2	3	5	11	8
The Open Championship	0	0	0	0	0	0	0	0
PGA Championship	0	1	0	1	5	7	10	10
Totals	0	3	1	4	10	18	30	27

- Most consecutive cuts made – 12 (1948 PGA – 1955 Masters)
- Longest streak of top-10s – 5 (1946 U.S. Open – 1947 PGA)

== U.S. national team appearances ==
- Ryder Cup: 1947 (winners), 1951 (winners), 1953 (winners)
- Lakes International Cup: 1952 (winners)
- Hopkins Trophy: 1953 (winners), 1954 (winners)

== See also ==
- List of golfers with most PGA Tour wins
