= Ed Furgol =

American professional golfer (1917–1997)

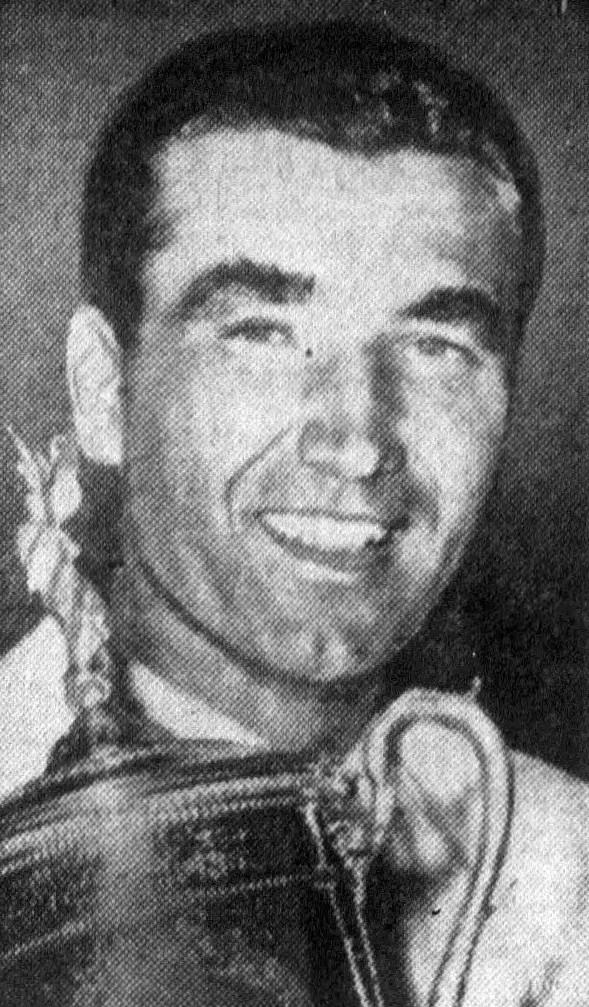
- Furgol, circa 1954

Personal information
- Full name: Edward Joseph Furgol
- Nationality: United States
- Born: March 24, 1917 New York Mills, New York, U.S.
- Died: March 6, 1997 (aged 79) Miami Shores, Florida, U.S.
- Height: 6 ft 1 in (1.85 m)
- Weight: 180 lb (82 kg; 13 st)
- Spouse: Helen

Career
- Sport: Golf
- Turned professional: 1945
- Former tours: PGA Tour; Senior PGA Tour
- Professional wins: 13

Number of wins by tour
- PGA Tour: 5
- Other: 8

Best results in major championships (wins: 1)
- Masters Tournament: T5: 1963
- PGA Championship: T3: 1956
- U.S. Open: Won: 1954
- The Open Championship: T19: 1955

Achievements and awards
- PGA Player of the Year: 1954

Edward Joseph Furgol (March 24, 1917 – March 6, 1997) was an American professional golfer. He is best known for winning the 1954 U.S. Open.

== Early life ==
Furgol was Polish-American born in New York Mills, New York.

At age twelve, Furgol injured his left elbow when he fell off a set of parallel bars at a playground. Despite several surgeries, the elbow never healed correctly and was left with a crooked arm ten inches (25 cm) shorter as a result. On the recommendation of his doctors, he took up golf.

== Professional career ==
Furgol won six times on the PGA Tour, including one major championship, the 1954 U.S. Open. Furgol won the 1954 Canada Cup as both an individual and teammate. He also played on the Ryder Cup team in 1957.

Although he was from the same town as fellow tour player Marty Furgol (1916–2005), they were not related.

== Personal life ==
Frugal was married to Helen. He died at age 79 in Miami Shores, Florida.

== Amateur wins ==
this list may be incomplete

- 1945 North and South Amateur

== Professional wins (13) ==
=== PGA Tour wins (5) ===
Legend
Major championships (1)
Other PGA Tour (4)

| No. | Date | Tournament | Winning score | Margin of victory | Runner-up |
|---|---|---|---|---|---|
| 1 | Feb 8, 1954 | Phoenix Open | −12 (71-68-65-68=272) | Playoff | (United States) Cary Middlecoff |
| 2 | Jun 19, 1954 | U.S. Open | +4 (71-70-71-72=284) | 1 stroke | (United States) Gene Littler |
| 3 | Aug 19, 1956 | Miller High Life Open | −15 (63-66-71-65=265) | 4 strokes | (United States) Gene Littler |
| 4 | Sep 9, 1956 | Rubber City Open | −17 (69-68-68-66=271) | 1 stroke | (United States) Arnold Palmer |
| 5 | Jan 20, 1957 | Agua Caliente Open | −8 (72-67-70-71=280) | Playoff | (United States) Al Besselink |

PGA Tour playoff record (2–1)

| No. | Year | Tournament | Opponent | Result |
|---|---|---|---|---|
| 1 | 1954 | Phoenix Open | (United States) Cary Middlecoff | Won with birdie on first extra hole |
| 2 | 1956 | Motor City Open | (United States) Bob Rosburg | Lost to par on first extra hole |
| 3 | 1957 | Agua Caliente Open | (United States) Al Besselink | Won with par on second extra hole |

=== Other wins (8) ===
- 1947 Bing Crosby Pro-Am
- 1951 Michigan PGA Championship
- 1954 Havana Invitational
- 1955 Canada Cup (team winner and individual winner)
- 1962 Tri-State PGA Championship
- 1963 Tri-State Championship
- 1965 Tri-State Championship

== Major championships ==
=== Wins (1) ===
| Year | Championship | 54 holes | Winning score | Margin | Runner-up |
|---|---|---|---|---|---|
| 1954 | U.S. Open | 1 shot lead | +4 (71-70-71-72=284) | 1 stroke | (United States) Gene Littler |

=== Results timeline ===
| Tournament | 1946 | 1947 | 1948 | 1949 |
|---|---|---|---|---|
| Masters Tournament | | T44 | T6 | T47 |
| U.S. Open | T12 | T13 | T45 | CUT |
| The Open Championship | | | | |
| PGA Championship | | | | |

| Tournament | 1950 | 1951 | 1952 | 1953 | 1954 | 1955 | 1956 | 1957 | 1958 | 1959 |
|---|---|---|---|---|---|---|---|---|---|---|
| Masters Tournament | | T15 | T38 | | | T24 | T24 | 6 | CUT | CUT |
| U.S. Open | CUT | CUT | CUT | CUT | 1 | T45 | T4 | CUT | CUT | CUT |
| The Open Championship | | | | | | T19 | | | | |
| PGA Championship | | R64 | R64 | R16 | R32 | R16 | SF | R128 | T48 | CUT |

| Tournament | 1960 | 1961 | 1962 | 1963 | 1964 | 1965 | 1966 |
|---|---|---|---|---|---|---|---|
| Masters Tournament | CUT | CUT | CUT | T5 | CUT | CUT | |
| U.S. Open | CUT | CUT | CUT | T38 | T14 | CUT | CUT |
| The Open Championship | | | | | | | |
| PGA Championship | | | | CUT | T13 | T33 | T49 |

Win
Top 10
Did not play

CUT = missed the half-way cut (3rd round cut in 1959 PGA Championship)
R128, R64, R32, R16, QF, SF = Round in which player lost in PGA Championship match play
"T" indicates a tie for a place

=== Summary ===
| Tournament | Wins | 2nd | 3rd | Top-5 | Top-10 | Top-25 | Events | Cuts made |
|---|---|---|---|---|---|---|---|---|
| Masters Tournament | 0 | 0 | 0 | 1 | 3 | 6 | 16 | 9 |
| U.S. Open | 1 | 0 | 0 | 2 | 2 | 5 | 21 | 8 |
| The Open Championship | 0 | 0 | 0 | 0 | 0 | 1 | 1 | 1 |
| PGA Championship | 0 | 0 | 1 | 1 | 3 | 5 | 13 | 11 |
| Totals | 1 | 0 | 1 | 4 | 8 | 17 | 51 | 29 |

- Most consecutive cuts made – 11 (1953 PGA – 1957 Masters)
- Longest streak of top-10s – 3 (1956 U.S. Open – 1957 Masters)

== U.S. national team appearances ==
- Ryder Cup: 1957
- Canada Cup: 1955 (winners, individual winner)
- Lakes International Cup: 1954 (withdrew)
- Hopkins Trophy: 1955 (winners)
