= Chandler Harper =

American professional golfer (1914–2004)

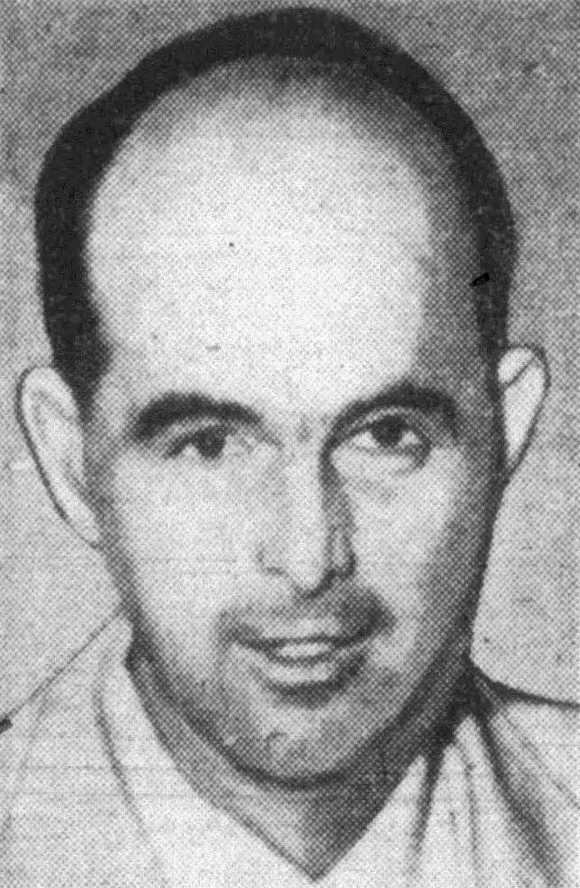
- Harper, circa 1954

Personal information
- Full name: John Chandler Harper
- Nickname: Old Bones
- Nationality: United States
- Born: March 10, 1914 Portsmouth, Virginia, U.S.
- Died: November 8, 2004 (aged 90) Portsmouth, Virginia, U.S.
- Height: 6 ft 0 in (1.83 m)
- Weight: 175 lb (79 kg; 12.5 st)

Career
- Sport: Golf
- Turned professional: 1934
- Former tour: PGA Tour
- Professional wins: 21

Number of wins by tour
- PGA Tour: 7
- Other: 14

Best results in major championships (wins: 1)
- Masters Tournament: T8: 1947
- PGA Championship: Won: 1950
- U.S. Open: T15: 1946
- The Open Championship: DNP

John Chandler Harper (March 10, 1914 – November 8, 2004) was an American professional golfer, best known for winning the PGA Championship in 1950. He won seven times on the PGA Tour and played in the Ryder Cup in 1955.

== Career ==
Harper was born, raised, and lived his entire life in Portsmouth, Virginia. He was prominent in Virginia golf, winning the Virginia Amateur three times (1930, 1932, 1934) and the Virginia Open a record nine times: in 1932, 1938, 1940, 1941, 1952, 1960, 1967, 1968, and 1970. His golfing career was interrupted by service in the U.S. Navy during World War II.

Harper's competitive career lasted from 1938 to 1955; and like most professional golfers of his generation, he spent most of his time as a club professional. Harper compensated for his lack of driving distance with a strong short game; Ben Hogan said that Harper was the best putter on tour.

After Curtis Strange's father died when he was 14, Harper became Strange's mentor. He was also a long-time friend of Bobby Jones.

In 1956, Harper founded Bide-A-Wee Golf Course in his hometown of Portsmouth, Virginia and managed the course until he retired in 1992.

== Personal life ==
In 2004, Harper died at the age of 90 of complications from pneumonia.

== Awards and honors ==
- In 1968, he was inducted into the PGA Hall of Fame.
- In 1973, Harper was inducted into the Virginia Sports Hall of Fame.

== Professional wins (21) ==
=== PGA Tour wins (7) ===
- 1942 (1) Miami Biltmore International Four-Ball (with Herman Keiser)
- 1950 (2) Tucson Open, **PGA Championship**
- 1953 (1) El Paso Open
- 1954 (1) Texas Open
- 1955 (2) Virginia Beach Open, Colonial National Invitation

Major championship is shown in bold.

=== Other wins (12) ===
- 1932 Virginia Open (as an amateur)
- 1938 Virginia Open
- 1940 Virginia Open
- 1941 Virginia Open
- 1952 Virginia Open
- 1954 Middle Atlantic PGA Championship
- 1960 Virginia PGA Open
- 1967 Virginia PGA Open
- 1968 Virginia Open, Virginia PGA Open
- 1969 Virginia PGA Open
- 1970 Virginia PGA Open

=== Senior wins (2) ===
- 1968 PGA Seniors' Championship, World Senior Championship

== Major championships ==
=== Wins (1) ===
Year	Championship	Winning score	Runner-up
1950	PGA Championship	4 & 3	(United States) Henry Williams, Jr.

Note: The PGA Championship was match play until 1958

=== Results timeline ===
Tournament	1935	1936	1937	1938	1939
Masters Tournament					
U.S. Open	CUT		CUT		CUT
PGA Championship					

Tournament	1940	1941	1942	1943	1944	1945	1946	1947	1948	1949
Masters Tournament			13	NT	NT	NT	19	T8	T40	
U.S. Open			NT	NT	NT	NT	T15	WD	WD	CUT
PGA Championship				NT			R32	R32	R32	R16

Tournament	1950	1951	1952	1953	1954	1955	1956	1957	1958	1959
Masters Tournament		WD	T38	T10	WD	WD		CUT	CUT	T14
U.S. Open			T41	WD	CUT	WD				
PGA Championship	**1**	R64	R32	R64			R16	R128	CUT	WD

Tournament	1960	1961	1962	1963	1964	1965	1966	1967	1968	1969
Masters Tournament	CUT	WD	T48							
U.S. Open										
PGA Championship	CUT							DQ		

Tournament	1970	1971
Masters Tournament		
U.S. Open		
PGA Championship		WD

Note: Harper never played in The Open Championship.

Win
Top 10
Did not play

NT = no tournament
WD = withdrew
DQ = disqualified
CUT = missed the half-way cut
R128, R64, R32, R16, QF, SF = round in which player lost in PGA Championship match play
"T" indicates a tie for a place

=== Summary ===
Tournament	Wins	2nd	3rd	Top-5	Top-10	Top-25	Events	Cuts made
Masters Tournament	0	0	0	0	2	5	15	7
U.S. Open	0	0	0	0	0	1	11	2
The Open Championship	0	0	0	0	0	0	0	0
PGA Championship	1	0	0	1	3	7	14	10
Totals	1	0	0	1	5	13	40	19

- Most consecutive cuts made – 5 (twice)
- Longest streak of top-10s – 1 (five times)

== U.S. national team appearances ==
- Ryder Cup: 1955 (winners)
- Hopkins Trophy: 1954 (winners)

== See also ==
- List of men's major championships winning golfers
