= Fred Hawkins (golfer) =

American professional golfer (1923–2014)

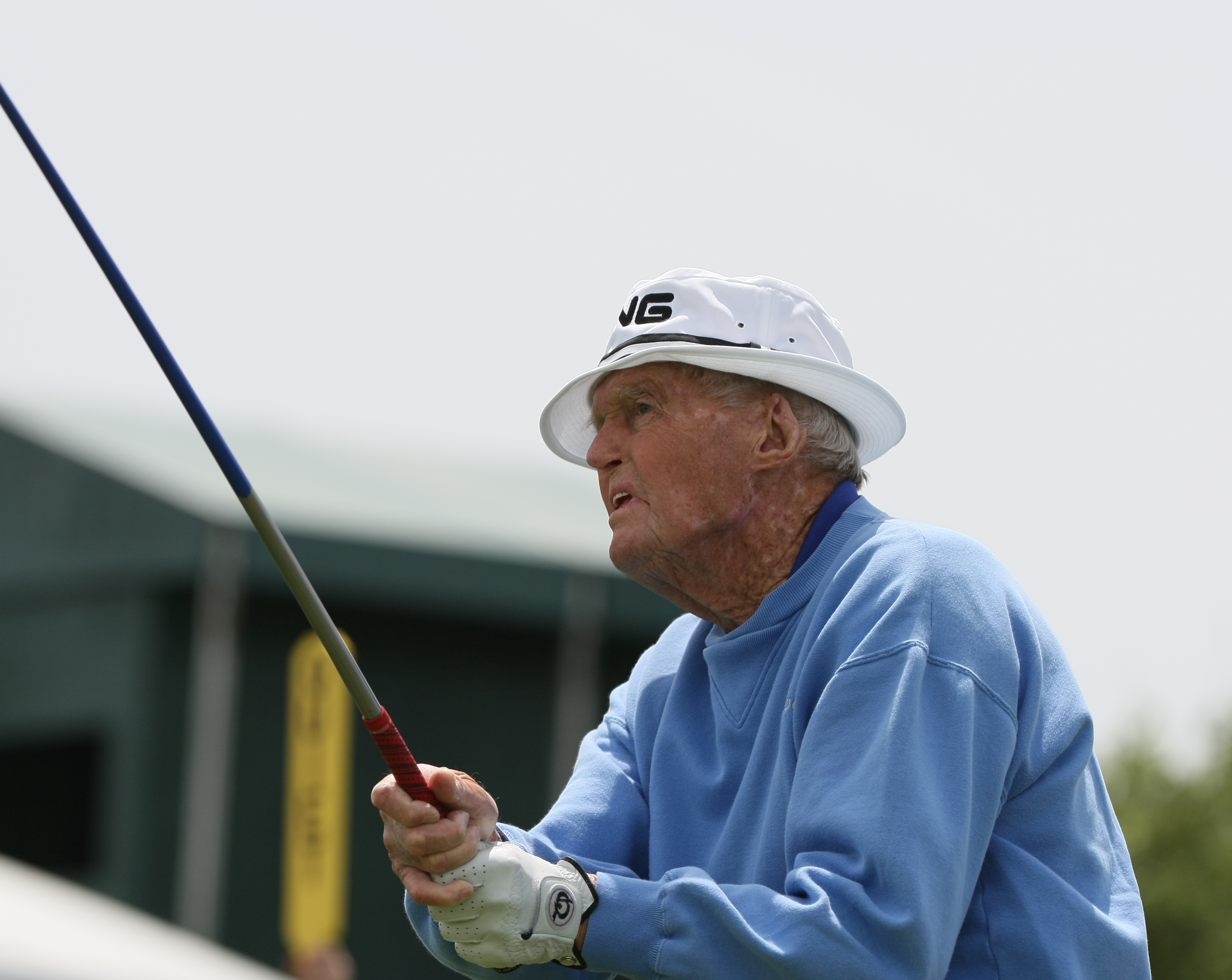
- Hawkins in 2010

Personal information
- Nationality: United States
- Born: September 3, 1923 Antioch, Illinois, U.S.
- Died: December 6, 2014 (aged 91) Sebring, Florida, U.S.
- Height: 6 ft 1.5 in (1.87 m)
- Weight: 165 lb (75 kg; 11.8 st)

Career
- Sport: Golf
- College: University of Illinois; Texas State School of Mines and Metallurgy (UTEP)
- Turned professional: 1947
- Former tours: PGA Tour; Champions Tour
- Professional wins: 3

Number of wins by tour
- PGA Tour: 1
- Other: 2

Best results in major championships
- Masters Tournament: T2: 1958
- PGA Championship: T5: 1955, 1956
- U.S. Open: T6: 1951, 1957
- The Open Championship: DNP

Fred Hawkins (September 3, 1923 – December 6, 2014) was an American professional golfer who played on the PGA Tour from the mid-1940s to the mid-1960s.

== Career ==
In 1923, Hawkins was born in Antioch, Illinois. He attended the University of Illinois and the Texas State School of Mines and Metallurgy.

In 1947, Hawkins turned professional. He won once and had 18 runner-up finishes on the PGA Tour. Hawkins's best year in professional golf was 1956 when he finished fourth on the money list plus notched his one and only PGA Tour win at the Oklahoma City Open. His best finish in a major was a second-place tie at the 1958 Masters Tournament won by Arnold Palmer. Hawkins also had a T-6 at the 1957 U.S. Open. He played on the 1957 Ryder Cup team, too.

Hawkins played on the Senior PGA Tour from 1980 to 1991. His best finishes were two T-3s in the 1983 Merrill Lynch/Golf Digest Commemorative Pro-Am and the 1984 Gatlin Brothers Seniors Golf Classic.

== Personal life ==
Hawkins lived in El Paso, Texas during much of his career, and lived in Sebring, Florida until his death in 2014.

== Professional wins (3) ==
=== PGA Tour wins (1) ===
No.	Date	Tournament	Winning score	Margin of victory	Runner-up
1	Sep 23, 1956	Oklahoma City Open	−9 (71-71-68-69=279)	2 strokes	(United States) Gardner Dickinson

PGA Tour playoff record (0–1)

No.	Year	Tournament	Opponent	Result
1	1959	Colonial National Invitation	(United States) Ben Hogan	Lost 18-hole playoff; Hogan: −1 (69), Hawkins: +3 (73)

=== Other wins (2) ===
- 1950 Cavalier Specialists Invitational
- 1961 New Mexico Open

== Results in major championships ==
Tournament	1948	1949	1950	1951	1952	1953	1954	1955	1956	1957	1958	1959	1960	1961	1962	1963
Masters Tournament					T7	T10	T58		T29	T16	T2	7	T16	T24	CUT	
U.S. Open	CUT			T6	T48			T19	CUT	T6		T11	CUT	CUT	T38	CUT
PGA Championship								QF	QF	R128	T14	T28	T10	T22	CUT	

Note: Hawkins never played in The Open Championship.

Top 10
Did not play

CUT = missed the half-way cut (3rd round cut in 1962 PGA Championship)
R128, R64, R32, R16, QF, SF = Round in which player lost in PGA Championship match play
"T" indicates a tie for a place

=== Summary ===
Tournament	Wins	2nd	3rd	Top-5	Top-10	Top-25	Events	Cuts made
Masters Tournament	0	1	0	1	4	7	10	9
U.S. Open	0	0	0	0	2	4	11	6
The Open Championship	0	0	0	0	0	0	0	0
PGA Championship	0	0	0	2	3	5	8	7
Totals	0	1	0	3	9	16	29	22

- Most consecutive cuts made – 10 (1956 PGA – 1960 Masters)
- Longest streak of top-10s – 2 (1951 U.S. Open – 1952 Masters)

== U.S. national team appearances ==
- Ryder Cup: 1957
