= Doug Ford (golfer) =

American professional golfer (1922–2018)

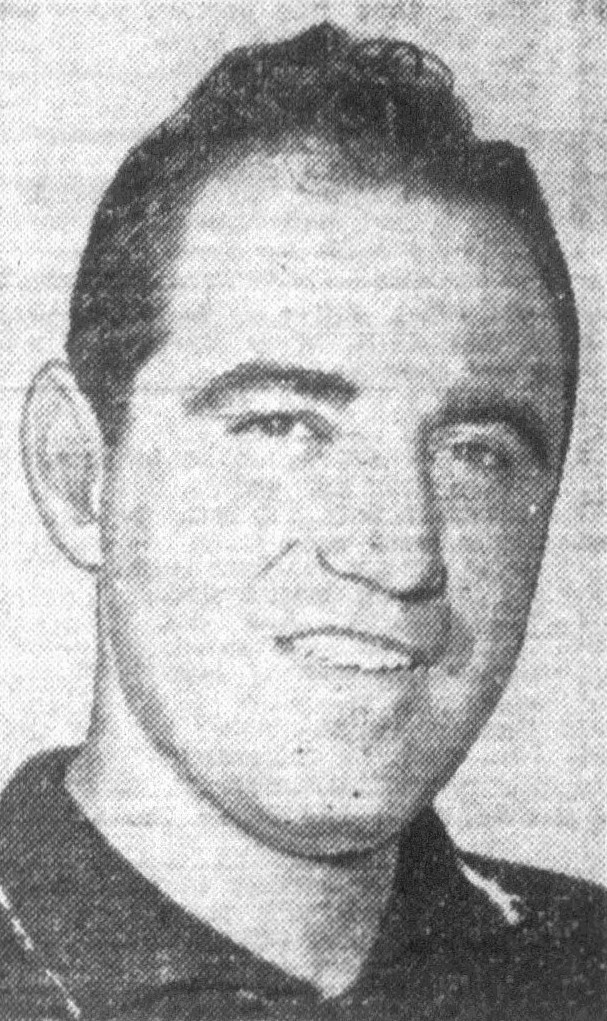
- Ford, circa 1953

Personal information
- Full name: Douglas Michael Ford Sr.
- Nationality: United States
- Born: August 6, 1922 West Haven, Connecticut, U.S.
- Died: May 14, 2018 (aged 95) Palm Beach Gardens, Florida, U.S.
- Height: 5 ft 11 in (1.80 m)
- Weight: 180 lb (82 kg; 13 st)

Career
- Sport: Golf
- Turned professional: 1949
- Former tours: PGA Tour; Champions Tour
- Professional wins: 34

Number of wins by tour
- PGA Tour: 19
- Other: 12 (regular); 3 (senior)

Best results in major championships (wins: 2)
- Masters Tournament: Won: 1957
- PGA Championship: Won: 1955
- U.S. Open: T5: 1959
- The Open Championship: T24: 1964

Achievements and awards
- World Golf Hall of Fame: 2011 (member page)
- PGA Player of the Year: 1955

Douglas Michael Ford Sr. (born Douglas Michael Fortunato; August 6, 1922 – May 14, 2018) was an American professional golfer and two-time major golf champion. Ford turned professional in 1949, later going on to win the 1955 PGA Championship and the 1957 Masters Tournament. He was also a member of four Ryder Cup teams (1955, 1957, 1959, and 1961) and was inducted into the World Golf Hall of Fame in 2011.

== Early life ==
Ford was born in West Haven, Connecticut, on August 6, 1922. During World War II, he served in the Coast Guard Air Division.

Ford recalled later in life that he showed enough promise as a baseball player that he received a contract offer from the New York Yankees. While he was considering the offer, his father asked how long he might expect to play baseball. When Doug said that he might expect to play professional baseball for about 10 years, his father responded, "Why don't you stay with the golf. You'll last forever."

== Professional career ==
Ford turned professional in 1949 and won for the first time in 1952 at the Jacksonville Open.

The win in Jacksonville was an unusual one. At the end of regulation play, Ford and Sam Snead were tied for the lead. An 18-hole playoff was scheduled for the next day but rather than play, Snead forfeited. The forfeit stemmed from a ruling Snead received during the tournament's second round of play. On the 10th hole, Snead's drive landed behind an out-of-bounds stake. While Chick Harbert, who was playing with Snead, thought the ball was out-of-bounds, a rules official ruled differently due to the starter not telling players the stakes had been moved since the previous day's play had ended. Afterwards, Snead explained why he forfeited even though Ford suggested they play sudden-death for the title. "I want to be fair about it. I don't want anyone to think I took advantage of the ruling."

Ford's first major title was the PGA Championship in 1955, which was contested at match play. He defeated Cary Middlecoff in the 36-hole final, 4 and 3. Ford was that season's PGA Player of the Year. In 1957, he holed out from a plugged lie in the bunker, on the final hole, to come from behind and beat Sam Snead by three strokes at the Masters Tournament. The last of his 19 PGA Tour wins came in 1963. Ford played on four Ryder Cup teams: 1955, 1957, 1959, and 1961.

Ford played in 49 Masters Tournaments, a record that stood until Arnold Palmer played in his 50th tournament three years later. His final Masters was in 2001 at age 78; he withdrew after an opening-hole double-bogey and was asked not to participate in future tournaments.

At the age of 88, Ford still regularly played casual golf.

== Personal life ==
Ford died in Palm Beach Gardens, Florida, on May 14, 2018, at the age of 95.

== Honors and awards ==
- In 1972, Ford was inducted into the Connecticut Golf Hall of Fame
- In 1992, Ford was inducted into the National Italian American Sports Hall of Fame
- In 2011, Ford was inducted into the World Golf Hall of Fame

== Professional wins (34) ==
=== PGA Tour wins (19) ===
Legend
Major championships (2)
Other PGA Tour (17)

No.	Date	Tournament	Winning score	Margin of victory	Runner(s)-up
1	Mar 24, 1952	Jacksonville Open	−8 (69-68-70-73=280)	Playoff	(United States) Sam Snead
2	Apr 19, 1953	Virginia Beach Open	−14 (63-65-67-67=262)	2 strokes	(United States) Ansel Snow
3	Aug 23, 1953	Labatt Open	−15 (67-69-64-65=265)	5 strokes	(United States) Walter Burkemo
4	Dec 13, 1953	Miami Open	−8 (68-67-70-67=272)	4 strokes	(United States) Sam Snead
5	Apr 5, 1954	Greater Greensboro Open	−1 (71-69-73-70=283)	Playoff	(United States) Marty Furgol
6	Aug 22, 1954	Fort Wayne Open	−18 (70-69-66-65=270)	3 strokes	(United States) Mike Souchak
7	Jul 26, 1955	PGA Championship	4 and 3		(United States) Cary Middlecoff
8	Aug 7, 1955	All American Open	−11 (69-69-69-70=277)	3 strokes	(United States) Leo Biagetti
9	Sep 26, 1955	Carling Golf Classic	−12 (70-69-68-69=276)	1 stroke	(United States) Art Wall Jr.
10	Jan 7, 1957	Los Angeles Open	−4 (69-71-71-69=280)	1 stroke	(United States) Jay Hebert
11	Apr 7, 1957	Masters Tournament	−5 (72-73-72-66=283)	3 strokes	(United States) Sam Snead
12	Jun 30, 1957	Western Open	−5 (69-71-67-72=279)	Playoff	(United States) George Bayer, (United States) Gene Littler, (United States) Billy Maxwell
13	Mar 16, 1958	Pensacola Open Invitational	−10 (70-65-70-73=278)	2 strokes	(United States) Ken Venturi, (United States) Art Wall Jr.
14	Jun 20, 1959	Canadian Open	−12 (68-69-69-70=276)	2 strokes	(United States) Dow Finsterwald, (United States) Art Wall Jr., (United States) Bo Wininger
15	May 29, 1960	500 Festival Open Invitation	−14 (66-68-68-68=270)	2 strokes	(United States) Jerry Barber
16	May 28, 1961	500 Festival Open Invitation (2)	−11 (69-69-67-68=273)	Playoff	(United States) Arnold Palmer
17	Jan 22, 1962	Bing Crosby National Pro-Am	−2 (70-73-69-74=286)	Playoff	(United States) Joe Campbell
18	Jun 24, 1962	Eastern Open Invitational	−9 (69-65-73-72=279)	1 stroke	(United States) Bob Goalby
19	Jul 6, 1963	Canadian Open (2)	−4 (69-67-74-70=280)	1 stroke	(United States) Al Geiberger

PGA Tour playoff record (5–7)

No.	Year	Tournament	Opponent(s)	Result
1	1951	Texas Open	(United States) Dutch Harrison	Lost 18-hole playoff; Harrison: −4 (67), Ford: −3 (68)
2	1951	Kansas City Open	(United States) Dave Douglas, (United States) Cary Middlecoff	Middlecoff won 18-hole playoff; Middlecoff: −4 (68), Douglas: E (72), Ford: E (72)
3	1952	Jacksonville Open	(United States) Sam Snead	Won after concession before playoff
4	1953	Greater Greensboro Open	(United States) Sam Snead, (United States) Earl Stewart, (United States) Art Wall Jr.	Stewart won with par on first extra hole after 18-hole playoff; Stewart: −2 (68), Snead: −2 (68), Ford: E (70), Wall: +2 (72)
5	1954	Greater Greensboro Open	(United States) Marty Furgol	Won 18-hole playoff; Ford: +1 (72), Furgol: +4 (75)
6	1955	Rubber City Open	(United States) Jackson Bradley, (United States) Jack Burke Jr., (United States) Henry Ransom	Ransom won with birdie on first extra hole
7	1955	Philadelphia Daily News Open	(United States) Ted Kroll	Lost to birdie on first extra hole
8	1956	Western Open	(United States) Mike Fetchick, (United States) Jay Hebert, (United States) Don January	Fetchick won 18-hole playoff; Fetchick: −6 (66), Hebert: −1 (71), Ford: E (72), January: +3 (75)
9	1957	Rubber City Open Invitational	(United States) Arnold Palmer	Lost to birdie on sixth extra hole
10	1957	Western Open	(United States) George Bayer, (United States) Gene Littler, (United States) Billy Maxwell	Won with par on third extra hole Littler and Maxwell eliminated by par on first hole
11	1961	500 Festival Open Invitation	(United States) Arnold Palmer	Won with birdie on second extra hole
12	1962	Bing Crosby National Pro-Am	(United States) Joe Campbell	Won with par on first extra hole

=== Other wins (12) ===
- 1956 Metropolitan Open
- 1957 Panama Open, Metropolitan PGA Championship, Westchester PGA Championship
- 1958 Metropolitan PGA Championship
- 1959 Eldorado Professional (tied with Sam Snead)
- 1960 Metropolitan PGA Championship
- 1961 Westchester Open, Westchester PGA Championship
- 1963 Westchester Open, Metropolitan PGA Championship, Westchester PGA Championship

=== Other senior wins (3) ===
- 1981 Merrill Lynch/Golf Digest Commemorative Pro-Am
- 1987 Liberty Mutual Legends of Golf - Legendary Division (with Jerry Barber)
- 1996 Liberty Mutual Legends of Golf - Demaret Division (with Art Wall Jr.)

== Playoff record ==
Senior PGA Tour playoff record (0–1)

No.	Year	Tournament	Opponent	Result
1	1981	Michelob-Egypt Temple Senior Classic	(United States) Don January	Lost to birdie on first extra hole

== Major championships ==
=== Wins (2) ===
Year	Championship	54 holes	Winning score	Margin	Runner-up
1955	PGA Championship	n/a	4 & 3		(United States) Cary Middlecoff
1957	Masters Tournament	3 shot deficit	−5 (72-73-72-66=283)	3 strokes	(United States) Sam Snead

=== Results timeline ===
Tournament	1949	1950	1951	1952	1953	1954	1955	1956	1957	1958	1959
Masters Tournament				T21	T21	T33		T6	1	T2	T25
U.S. Open	CUT	CUT	41	T19	T21	T35	T7	T9	T17	34	T5
The Open Championship											
PGA Championship							1	R32	R16	T11	T11

Tournament	1960	1961	1962	1963	1964	1965	1966	1967	1968	1969
Masters Tournament	T25	T32	T44	T11	T46	T31	T17	T31	T48	CUT
U.S. Open	T33	T6	T8	CUT	CUT		CUT			
The Open Championship					T24					
PGA Championship	T7	T5	5	T27	CUT	T20	CUT	CUT	CUT	CUT

Tournament	1970	1971	1972	1973	1974	1975	1976	1977	1978	1979
Masters Tournament	CUT	T46	CUT	CUT	CUT	CUT	CUT	CUT	CUT	WD
U.S. Open				CUT	CUT					
The Open Championship										
PGA Championship	CUT	CUT	CUT	T56	CUT	CUT	CUT	CUT	CUT	CUT

Tournament	1980	1981	1982	1983	1984	1985	1986	1987	1988	1989
Masters Tournament	CUT	CUT	CUT	WD	CUT	WD	CUT	CUT	CUT	CUT
U.S. Open										
The Open Championship										
PGA Championship	CUT	WD								

Tournament	1990	1991	1992	1993	1994	1995	1996	1997	1998	1999
Masters Tournament	CUT	WD	CUT	CUT	WD	WD	CUT	CUT	WD	WD
U.S. Open										
The Open Championship										
PGA Championship										

Tournament	2000	2001
Masters Tournament	WD	WD
U.S. Open		
The Open Championship		
PGA Championship		

Win
Top 10
Did not play

CUT = missed the halfway cut
WD = withdrew
R64, R32, R16, QF, SF = Round in which player lost in PGA Championship match play
"T" indicates a tie for a place.

=== Summary ===
Tournament	Wins	2nd	3rd	Top-5	Top-10	Top-25	Events	Cuts made
Masters Tournament	1	1	0	2	3	9	49	17
U.S. Open	0	0	0	1	5	8	19	12
The Open Championship	0	0	0	0	0	1	1	1
PGA Championship	1	0	0	3	5	9	27	11
Totals	2	1	0	6	13	27	96	41

- Most consecutive cuts made – 31 (1951 U.S. Open – 1963 Masters)
- Longest streak of top-10s – 4 (1955 U.S. Open – 1956 U.S. Open)

== U.S. national team appearances ==
- Ryder Cup: 1955 (winners), 1957, 1959 (winners), 1961 (winners)
- Hopkins Trophy: 1952 (winners), 1953 (winners), 1956 (winners)

== See also ==
- List of golfers with most PGA Tour wins
