= 1949 Masters Tournament =

- Front cover of the 1949 Masters Guide

Tournament information
- Dates: April 7–10, 1949
- Location: Augusta, Georgia; 33.503°N 82.020°W
- Course: Augusta National Golf Club
- Organized by: Augusta National Golf Club
- Tour: PGA Tour

Statistics
- Par: 72
- Length: 6,900 yards (6,310 m)
- Field: 58 players
- Cut: None
- Prize fund: $11,000
- Winner's share: $2,750

Champion
- (United States) Sam Snead
- 282 (−6)

Location map
- Location in the United States Location in Georgia

The 1949 Masters Tournament was the 13th Masters Tournament, held April 7–10 at Augusta National Golf Club in Augusta, Georgia. This was the first year that the famous Green Jacket was awarded to the tournament winner, and previous champions were awarded theirs retroactively.

Sam Snead shot consecutive rounds of 67 on the weekend to win by three strokes over runners-up Johnny Bulla and Lloyd Mangrum. This was the first of his three Masters victories and the third of his seven major championships. Snead also won the next major, the PGA Championship in May, and became the first to win those two in the same calendar year. He was followed by Jack Burke Jr. (1956) and Jack Nicklaus (1963, 1975); they completed their doubles in the summer (July, August).

Previous champions of both the Masters and PGA Championship, won in different calendar years, were Gene Sarazen, Byron Nelson, and Henry Picard.

Defending tour player of the year Ben Hogan did not play in the majors in 1949, due to a near-fatal automobile collision in west Texas in early February. Prior to the accident, he had won twice in January and was a runner-up in a playoff. Hogan returned to the tour on a limited basis in 1950 and won six more majors (nine total), including the Masters in 1951 and 1953. He finished fourth in 1950, in his first major back.

Founder and host Bobby Jones (1902–1971) played in his last Masters the year before; diagnosed with syringomyelia and recovering from spinal surgery, this was his first as a spectator.

== Field ==
1. Masters champions

Jimmy Demaret (9,10,12), Claude Harmon (9,12), Herman Keiser (9,10), Byron Nelson (2,6,9), Henry Picard (6), Gene Sarazen (2,4,6,9), Horton Smith, Craig Wood (2)

- Ralph Guldahl (2) did not play.

2. U.S. Open champions

Billy Burke, Johnny Farrell, Lawson Little (3,5), Lloyd Mangrum (9,10), Lew Worsham (10)

3. U.S. Amateur champions

Dick Chapman (a), Skee Riegel (9,a)

4. British Open champions

Denny Shute (6), Sam Snead (6,9,10,12)

5. British Amateur champions

Frank Stranahan (8,9,11,a), Robert Sweeny Jr. (a)

6. PGA champions

Jim Ferrier (9), Vic Ghezzi (9,10), Bob Hamilton (9), Johnny Revolta

7. Members of the U.S. 1949 Ryder Cup team

- Team not selected in time for inclusion.

8. Members of the U.S. 1949 Walker Cup team

- Team not selected in time for inclusion.

9. Top 24 players and ties from the 1948 Masters Tournament

Art Bell, Johnny Bulla (10,12), Ed Dudley (17), Ed Furgol, Fred Haas, Chick Harbert (12), Dutch Harrison, Dick Metz, Cary Middlecoff (10), Al Smith (10), Harry Todd

- Ben Hogan (2,6,10,12) did not play.

10. Top 24 players and ties from the 1948 U.S. Open

Skip Alexander, Herman Barron, Leland Gibson, Otto Greiner, Joe Kirkwood Jr., Jug McSpaden, Toney Penna, George Schneiter, Herschel Spears, Jim Turnesa, Ellsworth Vines

- Charles Congdon and Smiley Quick did not play.

11. 1948 U.S. Amateur quarter-finalists

Charles Coe (a), Gene Dahlbender (a), Jimmy McGonagill (a)

- Ray Billows (a), Bruce McCormick (a) and Willie Turnesa (3,5,a) did not play.

12. 1948 PGA Championship quarter-finalists

George Fazio, Mike Turnesa

13. One amateur, not already qualified, selected by a ballot of ex-U.S. Amateur champions

Johnny Dawson (a)

14. One professional, not already qualified, selected by a ballot of ex-U.S. Open champions

Johnny Palmer

15. Two players, not already qualified, with the best scoring average in the winter part of the 1950 PGA Tour

Pete Cooper, Clayton Heafner

16 Winner of 1948 Inter-service Invitational tournament

Fred Moseley (a)

17 Home club professional

18. Foreign invitations

John de Bendern (5,a), Tony Holguin, Bobby Locke (9,10)

== Round summaries ==
=== First round ===
Thursday, April 7, 1949

Place	Player	Score	To par
1	(United States) Lloyd Mangrum	69	−3
2	(United States) Frank Stranahan (a)	70	−2
T3	(United States) Leland Gibson	71	−1
T3	(United States) Clayton Heafner	71	−1
T3	(United States) Dick Metz	71	−1
T3	(United States) Johnny Revolta	71	−1
7	(United States) Lawson Little	72	E
T8	(United States) Herman Barron	73	+1
T8	(United States) Chick Harbert	73	+1
T8	(United States) Claude Harmon	73	+1
T8	(United States) Dutch Harrison	73	+1
T8	(United States) Joe Kirkwood, Jr.	73	+1
T8	(United States) Johnny Palmer	73	+1
T8	(United States) Sam Snead	73	+1
T8	(United States) Jim Turnesa	73	+1

=== Second round ===
Friday, April 8, 1949

Place	Player	Score	To par
T1	(United States) Herman Keiser	75-68=143	−1
T1	(United States) Lloyd Mangrum	69-74=143	−1
3	(United States) Johnny Palmer	73-71=144	E
T4	(United States) Fred Haas	75-70=145	+1
T4	(United States) Clayton Heafner	71-74=145	+1
T4	(United States) Joe Kirkwood, Jr.	73-72=145	+1
T4	(United States) Byron Nelson	75-70=145	+1
T4	(United States) Jim Turnesa	73-72=145	+1
9	(United States) Chick Harbert	73-73=146	+2
T10	(United States) Johnny Bulla	74-73=147	+3
T10	(United States) Dick Metz	71-76=147	+3
T10	(United States) Horton Smith	75-72=147	+3
T10	(United States) Frank Stranahan (a)	70-77=147	+3

=== Third round ===
Saturday, April 9, 1949

Place	Player	Score	To par
1	(United States) Johnny Palmer	73-71-70=214	−2
T2	(United States) Joe Kirkwood, Jr.	73-72-70=215	−1
T2	(United States) Lloyd Mangrum	69-74-72=215	−1
T2	(United States) Sam Snead	73-75-67=215	−1
T5	(United States) Johnny Bulla	74-73-69=216	E
T5	(United States) Jim Ferrier	77-72-67=216	E
T5	(United States) Jim Turnesa	73-72-71=216	E
8	(United States) Clayton Heafner	71-74-72=217	+1
T9	(United States) Herman Barron	73-75-71=219	+3
T9	(United States) Byron Nelson	75-70-74=219	+3

=== Final round ===
Sunday, April 10, 1949

==== Final leaderboard ====
Champion
Silver Cup winner (low amateur)
(a) = amateur
(c) = past champion

Top 10
Place	Player	Score	To par	Money (US$)
1	(United States) Sam Snead	73-75-67-67=282	−6	2,750
T2	(United States) Johnny Bulla	74-73-69-69=285	−3	1,100
T2	(United States) Lloyd Mangrum	69-74-72-70=285	−3	1,100
T4	(United States) Johnny Palmer	73-71-70-72=286	−2	440
T4	(United States) Jim Turnesa	73-72-71-70=286	−2	440
6	(United States) Lew Worsham	76-75-70-68=289	+1	330
7	(United States) Joe Kirkwood Jr.	73-72-70-75=290	+2	330
T8	(United States) Jimmy Demaret (c)	76-72-73-71=292	+4	312
T8	(United States) Clayton Heafner	71-74-72-75=292	+4	312
T8	(United States) Byron Nelson (c)	75-70-74-73=292	+4	312

Leaderboard below the top 10
Place	Player	Score	To par	Money ($)
T11	(United States) Claude Harmon (c)	73-75-73-72=293	+5	303
T11	(United States) Herman Keiser (c)	75-68-78-72=293	+5	303
T13	(United States) Herman Barron	73-75-71-75=294	+6	275
T13	(United States) Leland Gibson	71-77-74-72=294	+6	275
T13	(South Africa) Bobby Locke	74-74-74-72=294	+6	275
T16	(United States) Charles Coe (a)	77-72-72-74=295	+7	0
T16	(United States) Johnny Dawson (a)	78-72-72-73=295	+7	0
T16	(United States) Jim Ferrier	77-72-67-79=295	+7	275
T19	(Mexico) Tony Holguin	81-70-71-74=296	+8	248
T19	(United States) Frank Stranahan (a)	70-77-75-74=296	+8	0
T21	(United States) Pete Cooper	76-75-72-74=297	+9	248
T21	(United States) Henry Picard (c)	74-77-73-73=297	+9	248
T23	(United States) Bob Hamilton	77-79-69-73=298	+10	188
T23	(United States) Dutch Harrison	73-78-75-72=298	+10	188
T23	(United States) Lawson Little	72-77-73-76=298	+10	188
T23	(United States) Cary Middlecoff	76-77-72-73=298	+10	188
T23	(United States) Toney Penna	74-76-76-72=298	+10	188
T23	(United States) Horton Smith (c)	75-72-78-73=298	+10	188
29	(United States) Fred Haas	75-70-75-79=299	+11	
T30	(United States) Skip Alexander	74-77-75-74=300	+12	
T30	(United States) George Fazio	78-76-71-75=300	+12	
T30	(United States) Dick Metz	71-76-76-77=300	+12	
T30	(United States) Skee Riegel (a)	75-74-74-77=300	+12	
34	(United States) Craig Wood (c)	81-75-72-73=301	+13	
T35	(United States) Art Bell	81-74-75-72=302	+14	
T35	(United States) Billy Burke	76-74-74-78=302	+14	
T35	(United States) Vic Ghezzi	76-78-71-77=302	+14	
38	(United States) Ellsworth Vines	76-77-76-74=303	+15	
T39	(United States) Johnny Revolta	71-77-80-76=304	+16	
T39	(United States) Gene Sarazen (c)	75-74-76-79=304	+16	
T39	(United States) Harry Todd	74-79-76-75=304	+16	
T42	(United States) George Schneiter	77-76-73-79=305	+17	
T42	(United States) Al Smith	78-77-74-76=305	+17	
T42	(United States) Herschel Spears	76-77-77-75=305	+17	
T45	(United States) Fred Moseley (a)	77-75-78-76=306	+18	
T45	(United States) Denny Shute	79-74-76-77=306	+18	
T47	(United States) Ed Furgol	77-79-77-74=307	+19	
T47	(United States) Otto Greiner	77-75-78-77=307	+19	
49	(United States) Gene Dahlbender (a)	74-83-72-79=308	+20	
50	(United States) Dick Chapman (a)	77-75-81-76=309	+21	
51	(United States) Mike Turnesa	78-75-80-78=311	+23	
52	(United States) Robert Sweeny Jr. (a)	82-80-79-77=318	+30	
53	(United States) Johnny Farrell	76-80-81-83=320	+32	
WD	(United States) Chick Harbert	73-73-75=221	+5	
WD	(United States) Jimmy McGonagill (a)	82-78-77=237	+21	
WD	(United States) Ed Dudley	79-78-83=240	+24	
WD	(England) John de Bendern (a)	81-86-81=248	+32	
WD	(United States) Jug McSpaden	85	+13	

==== Scorecard ====
Hole	1	2	3	4	5	6	7	8	9	10	11	12	13	14	15	16	17	18
Par	4	5	4	3	4	3	4	5	4	4	4	3	5	4	5	3	4	4
(United States) Snead	−2	−3	−3	−4	−3	−3	−3	−4	−4	−3	−2	−3	−4	−4	−5	−5	−5	−6
(United States) Bulla	E	E	E	E	+1	E	E	−2	−2	−2	−2	−2	−3	−2	−3	−3	−3	−3
(United States) Mangrum	−1	−2	−2	−2	−2	−2	−2	−3	−3	−3	−3	−3	−3	−3	−4	−3	−3	−3
(United States) Palmer	−2	−2	−2	−2	−2	−2	−3	−2	−2	−2	−3	−1	−1	−1	−2	−2	−2	−2
(United States) Turnesa	E	−1	−1	−1	−1	−1	−1	−2	−2	−2	−2	E	−1	−1	−2	−2	−3	−2
(United States) Worsham	+5	+5	+5	+5	+5	+4	+3	+2	+2	+3	+4	+4	+3	+3	+2	+2	+2	+1
(United States) Kirkwood	−1	−2	−2	−2	−1	−1	−1	−1	−1	E	E	+1	E	+2	+1	+1	+1	+2
(United States) Ferrier	E	−1	−1	E	E	E	+1	+2	+2	+3	+2	+4	+7	+7	+6	+6	+6	+7

Cumulative tournament scores, relative to par

Eagle	Birdie	Bogey	Double bogey	Triple bogey +
