= 1950 Masters Tournament =

Golf tournament held in 1950

- Front cover of the 1950 Masters Guide

Tournament information
- Dates: April 6–9, 1950
- Location: Augusta, Georgia; 33.503°N 82.020°W
- Course: Augusta National Golf Club
- Organized by: Augusta National Golf Club
- Tour: PGA Tour

Statistics
- Par: 72
- Length: 6,900 yards (6,310 m)
- Field: 65 players
- Cut: None
- Prize fund: $12,000
- Winner's share: $2,400

Champion
- (United States) Jimmy Demaret
- 283 (−5)

Location map
- Location in the United States Location in Georgia

The 1950 Masters Tournament was the 14th Masters Tournament, held April 6–9 at Augusta National Golf Club in Augusta, Georgia. Jimmy Demaret won at 283 (−5) and became the first three-time Masters champion, with previous wins in 1940 and 1947. He played the par-five 13th hole (Azalea) in six-under-par for the week, with two eagles and two birdies at the pivotal 480-yard (440 m) hole.

== Tournament summary ==
Third round leader Jim Ferrier, a naturalized American originally from Australia, bogeyed five of the final six holes for 75 (+3) and was two strokes back as runner-up. Defending champion Sam Snead was third at 287 (−1).

Ben Hogan played in his first major since his near-fatal automobile accident in early 1949. In second place after 54 holes, he shot a 76 (+4) in the final round and fell back to even par for the week, in a tie for fourth place with Byron Nelson. Hogan won the next three majors he entered: the 1950 U.S. Open, 1951 Masters, and 1951 U.S. Open.

The tournament drew an estimated 10,000 patrons on Saturday and 18,000 on Sunday. With the favorable turnout, host Bobby Jones increased the original purse of $10,000 to $12,000.

== Field ==
1. Masters champions

Jimmy Demaret (7,9,12), Claude Harmon (9,10), Herman Keiser (9), Byron Nelson (2,6,9), Henry Picard (6,9), Gene Sarazen (2,4,6), Horton Smith (9,10), Sam Snead (4,6,7,9.10,12)

- Ralph Guldahl (2,10) and Craig Wood (2) did not play.

2. U.S. Open champions

Billy Burke, Johnny Farrell, Ben Hogan (6,7), Lawson Little (3,5,9), Lloyd Mangrum (7,9,10,12), Cary Middlecoff (9,10), Lew Worsham (9)

3. U.S. Amateur champions

Dick Chapman (8,a), Charles Coe (9,11,a), Skee Riegel (8,10)

4. British Open champions

Denny Shute (6)

5. British Amateur champions

Frank Stranahan (8,9,a), Robert Sweeny Jr. (a)

6. PGA champions

Jim Ferrier (9,10,12), Vic Ghezzi, Bob Hamilton (7,9)

7. Members of the U.S. 1949 Ryder Cup team

Skip Alexander, Chick Harbert (10), Dutch Harrison (9), Clayton Heafner (9,10,12), Johnny Palmer (9,10,12)

8. Members of the U.S. 1949 Walker Cup team

Tommy Barnes (a), Chuck Kocsis (a), Jim McHale Jr. (a)

- Ray Billows (a), Ted Bishop (3,a), Charles Coe (3,a), Johnny Dawson (9,11,a), Bruce McCormick (a) and Willie Turnesa (3,5,11,a) did not play. Barnes was a reserve for the team.

9. Top 24 players and ties from the 1949 Masters Tournament

Herman Barron, Johnny Bulla (10), Pete Cooper (10), Leland Gibson, Joe Kirkwood Jr., Toney Penna, Jim Turnesa (10)

10. Top 24 players and ties from the 1949 U.S. Open

Al Brosch, Dave Douglas, Fred Haas, Jack Isaacs, Les Kennedy, Eric Monti, Herschel Spears, Harry Todd, Gene Webb, Buck White

- Ellsworth Vines did not play.

11. 1949 U.S. Amateur quarter-finalists

Julius Boros, William C. Campbell (a), Rufus King (a), Harold Paddock Jr. (a), Frank Strafaci (a)

12. 1949 PGA Championship quarter-finalists

Ray Wade Hill, Henry Williams Jr.

13. One amateur, not already qualified, selected by a ballot of ex-U.S. Amateur champions

Harvie Ward (a)

14. One professional, not already qualified, selected by a ballot of ex-U.S. Open champions

Jack Burke Jr.

15. Two players, not already qualified, with the best scoring average in the winter part of the 1950 PGA Tour

George Fazio, Henry Ransom

16 Winner of 1949 Inter-service Invitational tournament

Fred Moseley (a)

17 Home club professional

Ed Dudley

18. Foreign invitations

Roberto De Vicenzo, Tony Holguin (9), Norman Von Nida

- Numbers in brackets indicate categories that the player would have qualified under had they been American.

== Round summaries ==
=== First round ===
Thursday, April 6, 1950

Place	Player	Score	To par
1	(United States) Skee Riegel	69	−3
T2	(United States) Jimmy Demaret	70	−2
T2	(Australia) Jim Ferrier	70	−2
T2	(United States) Horton Smith	70	−2
T2	(United States) Lawson Little	70	−2
T2	(United States) Herschel Spears	70	−2
T7	(United States) Toney Penna	71	−1
T7	(United States) Sam Snead	71	−1
9	(United States) Johnny Palmer	72	E
T10	(United States) Charles Coe (a)	73	+1
T10	(United States) George Fazio	73	+1
T10	(United States) Ben Hogan	73	+1

=== Second round ===
Friday, April 7, 1950

Place	Player	Score	To par
1	(Australia) Jim Ferrier	70-67=137	−7
2	(United States) Ben Hogan	73-68=141	−3
3	(United States) Jimmy Demaret	70-72=142	−2
4	(United States) Lawson Little	70-73=143	−1
T5	(United States) Skee Riegel	69-75=144	E
T5	(United States) Herschel Spears	70-74=144	E
T7	(United States) Byron Nelson	75-70=145	+1
T7	(United States) Henry Picard	74-71=145	+1
T7	(United States) Sam Snead	71-74=145	+1
10	(United States) Toney Penna	71-75=146	+2

=== Third round ===
Saturday, April 8, 1950

Place	Player	Score	To par
1	(Australia) Jim Ferrier	70-67-73=210	−6
2	(United States) Ben Hogan	73-68-71=212	−4
T3	(United States) Jimmy Demaret	70-72-72=214	−2
T3	(United States) Byron Nelson	75-70-69=214	−2
5	(United States) Sam Snead	71-74-70=215	−1
6	(United States) Lawson Little	70-73-75=218	+2
7	(United States) Cary Middlecoff	75-76-68=219	+3
8	(United States) Clayton Heafner	74-77-69=220	+4
T9	(United States) Herman Keiser	75-72-75=222	+6
T9	(United States) Henry Picard	74-71-77=222	+6
T9	(United States) Skee Riegel	69-75-78=222	+6
T9	(United States) Gene Sarazen	80-70-72=222	+6

=== Final round ===
Sunday, April 9, 1950

==== Final leaderboard ====
Champion
Silver Cup winner (low amateur)
(a) = amateur
(c) = past champion

Top 10
Place	Player	Score	To par	Money (US$)
1	(United States) Jimmy Demaret (c)	70-72-72-69=283	−5	2,400
2	(Australia) Jim Ferrier	70-67-73-75=285	−3	1,500
3	(United States) Sam Snead (c)	71-74-70-72=287	−1	1,020
T4	(United States) Ben Hogan	73-68-71-76=288	E	720
T4	(United States) Byron Nelson (c)	75-70-69-74=288	E	720
6	(United States) Lloyd Mangrum	76-74-73-68=291	+3	480
T7	(United States) Clayton Heafner	74-77-69-72=292	+4	405
T7	(United States) Cary Middlecoff	75-76-68-73=292	+4	405
9	(United States) Lawson Little	70-73-75-75=293	+5	360
T10	(United States) Fred Haas	74-76-73-71=294	+6	321
T10	(United States) Gene Sarazen (c)	80-70-72-72=294	+6	321

Leaderboard below the top 10
Place	Player	Score	To par	Money ($)
T12	(Argentina) Roberto De Vicenzo	76-76-73-71=296	+8	285
T12	(United States) Horton Smith (c)	70-79-75-72=296	+8	285
T14	(United States) Skip Alexander	78-74-72-73=297	+9	261
T14	(United States) Vic Ghezzi	78-75-70-74=297	+9	261
T14	(United States) Leland Gibson	78-73-72-74=297	+9	261
T14	(United States) Herman Keiser (c)	75-72-75-75=297	+9	261
T14	(United States) Joe Kirkwood Jr.	75-74-77-71=297	+9	261
T14	(United States) Henry Picard (c)	74-71-77-75=297	+9	261
T14	(United States) Frank Stranahan (a)	74-79-73-71=297	+9	0
T21	(United States) George Fazio	73-74-78-73=298	+10	244
T21	(United States) Toney Penna	71-75-77-75=298	+10	244
T21	(United States) Skee Riegel	69-75-78-76=298	+10	244
T24	(United States) Chick Harbert	76-75-73-75=299	+11	240
T24	(United States) Johnny Palmer	72-76-76-75=299	+11	240
26	(United States) Eric Monti	74-79-74-73=300	+12	
T27	(United States) Herschel Spears	70-74-79-78=301	+13	
T27	(Australia) Norman Von Nida	77-74-74-76=301	+13	
T29	(United States) Billy Burke	80-75-76-71=302	+14	
T29	(United States) Pete Cooper	74-77-77-74=302	+14	
31	(United States) Johnny Bulla	77-78-75-73=303	+15	
T32	(United States) Charles Coe (a)	73-79-78-74=304	+16	
T32	(United States) Bob Hamilton	74-73-78-79=304	+16	
T32	(United States) Claude Harmon (c)	77-77-74-76=304	+16	
T35	(United States) Tommy Barnes (a)	78-75-78-74=305	+17	
T35	(United States) Julius Boros	75-77-76-77=305	+17	
T35	(United States) Al Brosch	77-75-78-75=305	+17	
T35	(United States) Dick Chapman (a)	77-73-75-80=305	+17	
T35	(United States) Chuck Kocsis (a)	77-71-79-78=305	+17	
T35	(United States) Denny Shute	77-72-81-75=305	+17	
T35	(United States) Harvie Ward (a)	79-78-74-74=305	+17	
T42	(United States) Buck White	78-76-73-79=306	+18	
T42	(United States) Lew Worsham	77-78-76-75=306	+18	
T44	(Mexico) Tony Holguin	78-75-77-77=307	+19	
T44	(United States) Jack Isaacs	79-81-72-75=307	+19	
T46	(United States) Herman Barron	75-77-82-74=308	+20	
T46	(United States) William C. Campbell (a)	80-78-74-76=308	+20	
T46	(United States) Jim Turnesa	81-74-79-74=308	+20	
T49	(United States) Dave Douglas	79-79-76-75=309	+21	
T49	(United States) Harry Todd	76-75-81-77=309	+21	
T51	(United States) Jim McHale Jr. (a)	82-78-75-75=310	+22	
T51	(United States) Robert Sweeny Jr. (a)	77-76-79-78=310	+22	
T53	(United States) Ray Wade Hill	75-78-80-78=311	+23	
T53	(United States) Henry Williams Jr.	82-78-81-70=311	+23	
55	(United States) Gene Webb	76-78-75-83=312	+24	
56	(United States) Harold Paddock Jr. (a)	78-79-78-79=314	+26	
57	(United States) Fred Moseley (a)	82-77-78-79=316	+28	
58	(United States) Frank Strafaci (a)	77-82-84-81=324	+36	
59	(United States) Les Kennedy	81-80-82-82=325	+37	
WD	(United States) Jack Burke Jr.	76-79-77=232	+16	
WD	(United States) Rufus King (a)	80-78=158	+14	
WD	(United States) Henry Ransom	79	+7	
WD	(United States) Johnny Farrell	84	+12	
WD	(United States) Ed Dudley	85	+13	
WD	(United States) Dutch Harrison			

==== Scorecard ====
Hole	1	2	3	4	5	6	7	8	9	10	11	12	13	14	15	16	17	18
Par	4	5	4	3	4	3	4	5	4	4	4	3	5	4	5	3	4	4
(United States) Demaret	−1	−1	−1	−1	−1	−1	−1	−2	−3	−3	−3	−3	−4	−3	−4	−5	−5	−5
(Australia) Ferrier	−6	−7	−6	−6	−6	−7	−8	−8	−8	−8	−8	−8	−7	−6	−6	−5	−4	−3
(United States) Snead	E	E	E	E	E	E	+1	−1	−1	−1	−1	−1	−2	−1	−2	−2	−2	−1
(United States) Hogan	−4	−4	−3	−3	−2	−2	−1	−2	−2	−2	−1	−1	E	E	−1	E	+1	E
(United States) Nelson	−2	−2	−2	−2	−2	−2	−1	−2	−2	−2	−2	−2	−2	−1	−2	−1	E	E

Cumulative tournament scores, relative to par

Eagle	Birdie	Bogey
