= 1954 Masters Tournament =

- Front cover of the 1954 Masters Guide

Tournament information
- Dates: April 8–12, 1954
- Location: Augusta, Georgia; 33.503°N 82.020°W
- Course: Augusta National Golf Club
- Organized by: Augusta National Golf Club
- Tour: PGA Tour

Statistics
- Par: 72
- Length: 6,800 yards (6,220 m)
- Field: 78 players
- Cut: None
- Prize fund: $25,000
- Winner's share: $5,000

Champion
- (United States) Sam Snead
- 289 (+1), playoff

Location map
- Location in the United States Location in Georgia

The 1954 Masters Tournament was the 18th Masters Tournament, held April 8–12 at Augusta National Golf Club in Augusta, Georgia. Sam Snead defeated defending champion Ben Hogan by one stroke in an 18-hole Monday playoff to win his third Masters tournament. It was Snead's seventh and final major victory.

Both Snead and Hogan were age 41, and they had won the previous three Masters; Snead in 1952 and Hogan in 1951 and 1953. Hogan was also the reigning champion of the U.S. Open and British Open; he did not win another major, but often contended until his final appearances in 1967 at the Masters and U.S. Open.

Snead's 289 (+1), along with Jack Burke Jr. in 1956 and Zach Johnson in 2007, remains the highest winning total in Masters history. Amateur Billy Joe Patton, 31, led after the first and second rounds and during the fourth, but a seven at the 13th hole and a six at the 15th ended his title hopes, and he finished one stroke back.

Snead remained the oldest winner of the Masters for nearly a quarter century, until Gary Player won his third green jacket at age 42 in 1978.

== Field ==
1. Masters champions

Jimmy Demaret (10), Claude Harmon (12), Ben Hogan (2,4,6,9,10), Byron Nelson (2,6), Gene Sarazen (2,4,6), Horton Smith, Sam Snead (4,6,7,9,10), Craig Wood (2)

- Ralph Guldahl (2), Herman Keiser and Henry Picard (6) did not play.

2. U.S. Open champions

Julius Boros (9,10), Lawson Little (3,5), Lloyd Mangrum (7,9,10), Fred McLeod, Cary Middlecoff (7), Sam Parks Jr., Lew Worsham

3. U.S. Amateur champions

Dick Chapman (5,8,a), Charles Coe (8,9,a), Gene Littler (8,11), Billy Maxwell, Skee Riegel, Jess Sweetser (5,a)

4. British Open champions

Jock Hutchison (6), Denny Shute (6)

5. British Amateur champions

Frank Stranahan (9,10,a), Robert Sweeny Jr. (a), Harvie Ward (8,9,a)

6. PGA champions

Walter Burkemo (7,12), Jim Ferrier (9), Vic Ghezzi, Chandler Harper (9), Johnny Revolta, Jim Turnesa (7,10)

7. Members of the U.S. 1953 Ryder Cup team

Jack Burke Jr. (9,10), Dave Douglas (12), Fred Haas (10), Ted Kroll (9,10), Ed Oliver (9)

8. Members of the U.S. 1953 Walker Cup team

Arnold Blum (a), William C. Campbell (a), Don Cherry (a), Jimmy Jackson (a), Jim McHale Jr. (a), Billy Joe Patton (a), Ken Venturi (a)

- Sam Urzetta (3,a) and Jack Westland (3,a) did not play. Blum, McHale and Patton were reserves for the team.

9. Top 24 players and ties from the 1953 Masters Tournament

Jerry Barber, Al Besselink, Tommy Bolt, Doug Ford (10), Leland Gibson, Chick Harbert, Fred Hawkins, Dick Mayer, Al Mengert (10), Dick Metz (10), Johnny Palmer, Earl Stewart

- Bob Hamilton (6) did not play.

10. Top 24 players and ties from the 1953 U.S. Open

Pete Cooper, Gardner Dickinson, Clarence Doser, George Fazio, Marty Furgol, Dutch Harrison, Jay Hebert, Bill Nary (12), Bill Ogden, Bob Rosburg, Frank Souchak (a)

11. 1953 U.S. Amateur quarter-finalists

Don Albert (a), Bruce Cudd (a), Bobby Kuntz (a), Dale Morey (a), Ray Palmer (a), Angelo Santilli (a)

- Ted Richards Jr. did not play.

12. 1953 PGA Championship quarter-finalists

Jimmy Clark, Jack Isaacs, Felice Torza

- Henry Ransom did not play.

13. One amateur, not already qualified, selected by a ballot of ex-U.S. Amateur champions

- Johnny Dawson (a) was selected but did not play.

14. One professional, not already qualified, selected by a ballot of ex-U.S. Open champions

Skip Alexander

15. Two players, not already qualified, with the best scoring average in the winter part of the 1954 PGA Tour

Bud Holscher, Bob Toski

16. Foreign invitations

Peter Thomson

== Round summaries ==
=== First round ===
Thursday, April 8, 1954

Place	Player	Score	To par
T1	(United States) Billy Joe Patton (a)	70	−2
T1	(United States) Dutch Harrison	70	−2
T3	(United States) Lloyd Mangrum	71	−1
T3	(United States) Jack Burke Jr.	71	−1
T5	(United States) Ben Hogan	72	E
T5	(United States) Dave Douglas	72	E
T7	(United States) Byron Nelson	73	+1
T7	(United States) Bob Rosburg	73	+1
T7	(United States) Chick Harbert	73	+1
T7	(United States) Denny Shute	73	+1
T7	(United States) Tommy Bolt	73	+1
T7	(United States) Vic Ghezzi	73	+1
T7	(United States) Gardner Dickinson	73	+1
T7	(United States) Pete Cooper	73	+1
T7	(United States) William C. Campbell (a)	73	+1
T7	(United States) Cary Middlecoff	73	+1

=== Second round ===
Friday, April 9, 1954

Place	Player	Score	To par
1	(United States) Billy Joe Patton (a)	70-74=144	E
2	(United States) Ben Hogan	72-73=145	+1
T3	(United States) Bob Rosburg	73-73=146	+2
T3	(United States) Lloyd Mangrum	71-75=146	+2
T5	(United States) Tommy Bolt	73-74=147	+3
T5	(United States) Sam Snead	74-73=147	+3
T7	(United States) Al Besselink	74-74=148	+4
T7	(United States) Lew Worsham	74-74=148	+4
T7	(United States) Chick Harbert	73-75=148	+4
T7	(United States) Dave Douglas	72-76=148	+4
T7	(United States) Jack Burke Jr.	71-77=148	+4
T7	(Australia) Peter Thomson	76-72=148	+4

=== Third round ===
Saturday, April 10, 1954

Place	Player	Score	To par
1	(United States) Ben Hogan	72-73-69=214	−2
2	(United States) Sam Snead	74-73-70=217	+1
T3	(United States) Cary Middlecoff	73-76-70=219	+3
T3	(United States) Tommy Bolt	73-74-72=219	+3
T3	(United States) Billy Joe Patton (a)	70-74-75=219	+3
T6	(United States) Jerry Barber	74-76-71=221	+5
T6	(United States) Jack Burke Jr.	71-77-73=221	+5
T8	(United States) Al Besselink	74-74-74=222	+6
T8	(United States) Lew Worsham	74-74-74=222	+6
T8	(United States) Lloyd Mangrum	71-75-76=222	+6
T8	(United States) Bob Rosburg	73-73-76=222	+6

=== Final round ===
Sunday, April 11, 1954

==== Final leaderboard ====
Champion
Silver Cup winner (low amateur)
(a) = amateur
(c) = past champion

Top 10
Place	Player	Score	To par	Money (US$)
T1	(United States) Ben Hogan (c)	72-73-69-75=289	+1	Playoff
T1	(United States) Sam Snead (c)	74-73-70-72=289	+1	Playoff
3	(United States) Billy Joe Patton (a)	70-74-75-71=290	+2	0
T4	(United States) Dutch Harrison	70-79-74-68=291	+3	1,938
T4	(United States) Lloyd Mangrum	71-75-76-69=291	+3	1,938
T6	(United States) Jerry Barber	74-76-71-71=292	+4	1,042
T6	(United States) Jack Burke Jr.	71-77-73-71=292	+4	1,042
T6	(United States) Bob Rosburg	73-73-76-70=292	+4	1,042
T9	(United States) Al Besselink	74-74-74-72=294	+6	781
T9	(United States) Cary Middlecoff	73-76-70-75=294	+6	781

Leaderboard below the top 10
Place	Player	Score	To par	Money ($)
11	(United States) Dick Chapman (a)	75-75-75-70=295	+7	0
T12	(United States) Tommy Bolt	73-74-72-77=296	+8	631
T12	(United States) Chick Harbert	73-75-75-73=296	+8	631
T12	(United States) Byron Nelson (c)	73-76-74-73=296	+8	631
T12	(United States) Lew Worsham	74-74-74-74=296	+8	631
T16	(United States) Julius Boros	76-79-68-74=297	+9	563
T16	(United States) Jay Hebert	79-74-74-70=297	+9	563
T16	(Australia) Peter Thomson	76-72-76-73=297	+9	563
T16	(United States) Ken Venturi (a)	76-74-73-74=297	+9	0
T20	(United States) Charles Coe (a)	76-75-73-74=298	+10	0
T20	(United States) Harvie Ward (a)	78-75-74-71=298	+10	0
T22	(United States) Walter Burkemo	74-77-75-73=299	+11	443
T22	(United States) Pete Cooper	73-76-75-75=299	+11	443
T22	(United States) Marty Furgol	76-79-75-69=299	+11	443
T22	(United States) Gene Littler	79-75-73-72=299	+11	443
T22	(United States) Ed Oliver	75-75-75-74=299	+11	443
T22	(United States) Earl Stewart	78-75-75-71=299	+11	443
T22	(United States) Bob Toski	80-74-71-74=299	+11	443
T29	(United States) Jimmy Demaret (c)	80-75-72-73=300	+12	333
T29	(United States) Vic Ghezzi	73-79-73-75=300	+12	333
T29	(United States) Dick Mayer	76-75-72-77=300	+12	333
32	(United States) Gardner Dickinson	73-78-76-74=301	+13	250
T33	(United States) Jimmy Clark	76-82-72-72=302	+14	250
T33	(United States) George Fazio	78-79-74-71=302	+14	250
T33	(United States) Doug Ford	77-78-74-73=302	+14	250
T33	(United States) Fred Haas	76-78-78-70=302	+14	250
T33	(United States) Johnny Palmer	75-81-77-69=302	+14	250
T38	(United States) Clarence Doser	74-78-72-79=303	+15	250
T38	(United States) Lawson Little	76-77-74-76=303	+15	250
T38	(United States) Al Mengert	76-79-73-75=303	+15	250
T38	(United States) Skee Riegel	75-76-76-76=303	+15	250
T38	(United States) Horton Smith (c)	80-78-71-74=303	+15	250
T43	(United States) Billy Maxwell	75-77-77-75=304	+16	250
T43	(United States) Frank Stranahan (a)	79-75-72-78=304	+16	0
T43	(United States) Felice Torza	74-78-74-78=304	+16	250
T46	(United States) Skip Alexander	80-77-73-75=305	+17	250
T46	(United States) Bruce Cudd (a)	76-78-73-78=305	+17	0
T46	(United States) Leland Gibson	75-77-78-75=305	+17	250
T46	(United States) Bud Holscher	78-77-73-77=305	+17	250
T46	(United States) Bill Nary	78-74-78-75=305	+17	250
T51	(United States) William C. Campbell (a)	73-77-75-81=306	+18	0
T51	(United States) Ted Kroll	78-76-75-77=306	+18	250
T53	(United States) Arnold Blum (a)	75-82-75-75=307	+19	0
T53	(United States) Dave Douglas	72-76-77-82=307	+19	250
T53	(United States) Claude Harmon (c)	77-75-77-78=307	+19	250
T53	(United States) Jack Isaacs	76-79-76-76=307	+19	250
T53	(United States) Gene Sarazen (c)	79-75-78-75=307	+19	250
T58	(United States) Don Cherry (a)	80-79-74-76=309	+21	0
T58	(United States) Fred Hawkins	78-80-76-75=309	+21	250
T60	(United States) Bill Ogden	81-76-77-76=310	+22	250
T60	(United States) Johnny Revolta	81-79-75-75=310	+22	250
T60	(United States) Jim Turnesa	83-79-75-73=310	+22	250
63	(United States) Robert Sweeny Jr. (a)	81-76-79-76=312	+24	0
T64	(United States) Jimmy Jackson (a)	75-82-79-78=314	+26	0
T64	(United States) Bobby Kuntz (a)	80-77-82-75=314	+26	0
66	(United States) Jim McHale Jr. (a)	78-82-79-76=315	+27	0
67	(United States) Don Albert (a)	77-79-83-77=316	+28	0
T68	(United States) Angelo Santilli (a)	79-81-82-75=317	+29	0
T68	(United States) Denny Shute	73-85-82-77=317	+29	250
70	(United States) Ray Palmer (a)	84-78-80-77=319	+31	0
71	(United States) Craig Wood (c)	87-80-78-75=320	+32	250
72	(United States) Sam Parks Jr.	86-79-79-80=324	+36	250
WD	(United States) Dale Morey (a)	83-75-76=234	+18	
WD	(United States) Jim Ferrier	78-78=156	+12	
WD	(United States) Jess Sweetser (a)	79	+7	
WD	(United States) Chandler Harper	83	+11	
WD	(United States) Frank Souchak (a)	90	+18	
WD	(United States) Jock Hutchison			
WD	(United States) Fred McLeod			

==== Scorecard ====
Hole	1	2	3	4	5	6	7	8	9	10	11	12	13	14	15	16	17	18
Par	4	5	4	3	4	3	4	5	4	4	4	3	5	4	5	3	4	4
(United States) Snead	+1	+1	+1	+2	+3	+2	+2	+2	+2	+2	+2	+3	+2	+2	+1	+1	+1	+1
(United States) Hogan	−1	−1	−2	−2	−2	−2	−1	−1	−1	−1	+1	+1	+1	+2	+1	+1	+1	+1
(United States) Patton	+4	+3	+3	+3	+3	+1	+1	E	−1	−1	−1	E	+2	+1	+2	+2	+2	+2
(United States) Harrison	+7	+6	+6	+6	+6	+5	+5	+5	+5	+5	+5	+5	+4	+5	+4	+4	+3	+3
(United States) Mangrum	+6	+5	+6	+6	+6	+6	+6	+6	+6	+6	+6	+6	+6	+6	+5	+4	+3	+3

Cumulative tournament scores, relative to par

Eagle	Birdie	Bogey	Double bogey

=== Playoff ===
Monday, April 12, 1954

Place	Player	Score	To par	Money ($)
1	(United States) Sam Snead	70	−2	5,000
2	(United States) Ben Hogan	71	−1	3,125

==== Scorecard ====
Hole	1	2	3	4	5	6	7	8	9	10	11	12	13	14	15	16	17	18
Par	4	5	4	3	4	3	4	5	4	4	4	3	5	4	5	3	4	4
(United States) Snead	E	−1	−1	E	E	−1	−1	−1	−1	−2	−2	−1	−2	−2	−3	−3	−3	−2
(United States) Hogan	E	−1	−1	−1	−1	−1	−1	−1	−1	−1	−1	−1	−1	−1	−2	−1	−1	−1
