= 1952 Masters Tournament =

- Front cover of the 1952 Masters Guide

Tournament information
- Dates: April 3–6, 1952
- Location: Augusta, Georgia; 33.503°N 82.020°W
- Course: Augusta National Golf Club
- Organized by: Augusta National Golf Club
- Tour: PGA Tour

Statistics
- Par: 72
- Field: 72 players
- Cut: None
- Prize fund: $20,000
- Winner's share: $4,000

Champion
- (United States) Sam Snead
- 286 (−2)

Location map
- Location in the United States Location in Georgia

The 1952 Masters Tournament was the 16th Masters Tournament, held April 3–6 at Augusta National Golf Club in Augusta, Georgia.

In strong winds and cool temperatures on the final two days, Sam Snead held on to the lead and won the second of his three Masters titles, four strokes ahead of runner-up Jack Burke Jr. It was the sixth of Snead's seven major titles.

Defending champion Ben Hogan hosted the first Masters Club dinner (popularly known as the Champions dinner). He was the co-leader with Snead after three rounds at 214 (−2), but shot a 79 (+7) on Sunday and finished seven strokes back.

With a Sunday gallery estimated at 18,000 patrons at five dollars each, the purse was doubled by the tournament committee to $20,000, with a winner's share of $4,000.

== Field ==
1. Masters champions

Jimmy Demaret (7,10), Claude Harmon, Ben Hogan (2,6,7,9,10), Byron Nelson (2,6,9), Henry Picard (6,10), Gene Sarazen (2,4,6,9), Horton Smith, Sam Snead (4,6,7,9,10,12), Craig Wood (2)

- Ralph Guldahl (2) and Herman Keiser did not play.

2. U.S. Open champions

Billy Burke, Lawson Little (3,5,9), Lloyd Mangrum (7,9,10), Fred McLeod, Cary Middlecoff (9,10), Lew Worsham (9,10)

3. U.S. Amateur champions

Ted Bishop (a), Dick Chapman (5,8,9,a), Charles Coe (8,9,11,a), Billy Maxwell (11,a), Skee Riegel (9,10), Jess Sweetser (5,a), Sam Urzetta (8,a), Bud Ward

4. British Open champions

Denny Shute (6)

5. British Amateur champions

Frank Stranahan (8,a), Robert Sweeny Jr. (a)

6. PGA champions

Jim Ferrier (9), Vic Ghezzi, Bob Hamilton, Chandler Harper, Johnny Revolta (10)

7. Members of the U.S. 1951 Ryder Cup team

Skip Alexander, Jack Burke Jr. (9,12), Clayton Heafner (9,10), Ed Oliver (10)

- Dutch Harrison (9) and Henry Ransom (10) did not play.

8. Members of the U.S. 1951 Walker Cup team

Dow Finsterwald, Bill Goodloe (a), Bobby Knowles (a), Jim McHale Jr. (a), Al Mengert (a), Harvie Ward (a)

- William C. Campbell (a), Harold Paddock Jr. (a) and Willie Turnesa (a) did not play. Finsterwald, Goodloe, Mengert and Ward were reserves for the team.

9. Top 24 players and ties from the 1951 Masters Tournament

Al Besselink (10), Julius Boros (10), Johnny Bulla (12), Dave Douglas (10), George Fazio, Ed Furgol, Joe Kirkwood Jr. (10), Bob Toski

10. Top 24 players and ties from the 1951 U.S. Open

Charlie Bassler (12), Al Brosch (12), Marty Furgol, Ray Gafford, Fred Hawkins, Chuck Kocsis (a), Johnny Palmer, Smiley Quick, Earl Stewart, Buck White

- Paul Runyan (6) did not play.

11. 1951 U.S. Amateur quarter-finalists

Arnold Blum (a), Jimmy Frisina (a), Tommy Jacobs (a)

- Jack Benson (a), Joe Gagliardi (a) and Ed Martin (a) did not play.

12. 1951 PGA Championship quarter-finalists

Walter Burkemo, Reggie Myles

- Ellsworth Vines did not play.

13. One amateur, not already qualified, selected by a ballot of ex-U.S. Amateur champions

Johnny Dawson (a)

14. One professional, not already qualified, selected by a ballot of ex-U.S. Open champions

Tommy Bolt

15. Two players, not already qualified, with the best scoring average in the winter part of the 1952 PGA Tour

Doug Ford, Ted Kroll

16. Foreign invitations

Stan Leonard, Bobby Locke (4,10), Albert Pélissier, Norman Von Nida

- Numbers in brackets indicate categories that the player would have qualified under had they been American.

== Round summaries ==
=== First round ===
Thursday, April 3, 1952

Place	Player	Score	To par
T1	(United States) Ray Gafford	69	−3
T1	(United States) Johnny Palmer	69	−3
T3	(United States) Al Besselink	70	−2
T3	(United States) Ben Hogan	70	−2
T3	(United States) Sam Snead	70	−2
T6	(United States) Skip Alexander	71	−1
T6	(United States) Tommy Bolt	71	−1
T6	(United States) Doug Ford	71	−1
T6	(United States) Fred Hawkins	71	−1
T6	(United States) Joe Kirkwood, Jr.	71	−1
T6	(United States) Lloyd Mangrum	71	−1
T6	(United States) Johnny Revolta	71	−1
T6	(United States) Lew Worsham	71	−1

=== Second round ===
Friday, April 4, 1952

Place	Player	Score	To par
1	(United States) Sam Snead	70-67=137	−7
2	(United States) Ben Hogan	70-70=140	−4
T3	(United States) Tommy Bolt	71-71=142	−2
T3	(United States) Jim Ferrier	72-70=142	−2
T3	(United States) Johnny Revolta	71-71=142	−2
T6	(United States) Jack Burke Jr.	76-67=143	−1
T6	(United States) George Fazio	72-71=143	−1
T6	(United States) Johnny Palmer	69-74=143	−1
T6	(United States) Harvie Ward (a)	72-71=143	−1
T10	(United States) Skip Alexander	71-73=144	E
T10	(United States) Dow Finsterwald	72-72=144	E
T10	(United States) Fred Hawkins	71-73=144	E
T10	(United States) Cary Middlecoff	72-72=144	E
T10	(United States) Ed Oliver	72-72=144	E

=== Third round ===
Saturday, April 5, 1952

Place	Player	Score	To par
T1	(United States) Ben Hogan	70-70-74=214	−2
T1	(United States) Sam Snead	70-67-77=214	−2
3	(United States) Cary Middlecoff	72-72-72=216	E
T4	(United States) Al Besselink	70-76-71=217	+1
T4	(United States) Tommy Bolt	71-71-75=217	+1
6	(United States) Johnny Palmer	69-74-75=218	+2
T7	(United States) Jim Ferrier	72-70-77=219	+3
T7	(United States) Johnny Revolta	71-71-77=219	+3
T7	(United States) Lew Worsham	71-75-73=219	+3
10	(United States) Lloyd Mangrum	71-74-75=220	+4

=== Final round ===
Sunday, April 6, 1952

==== Final leaderboard ====
Champion
Silver Cup winner (low amateur)
(a) = amateur
(c) = past champion

Top 10
Place	Player	Score	To par	Money (US$)
1	(United States) Sam Snead (c)	70-67-77-72=286	−2	4,000
2	(United States) Jack Burke Jr.	76-67-78-69=290	+2	2,500
T3	(United States) Al Besselink	70-76-71-74=291	+3	1,367
T3	(United States) Tommy Bolt	71-71-75-74=291	+3	1,367
T3	(United States) Jim Ferrier	72-70-77-72=291	+3	1,367
6	(United States) Lloyd Mangrum	71-74-75-72=292	+4	800
T7	(United States) Julius Boros	73-73-76-71=293	+5	625
T7	(United States) Fred Hawkins	71-73-78-71=293	+5	625
T7	(United States) Ben Hogan (c)	70-70-74-79=293	+5	625
T7	(United States) Lew Worsham	71-75-73-74=293	+5	625

Leaderboard below the top 10
Place	Player	Score	To par	Money ($)
11	(United States) Cary Middlecoff	72-72-72-78=294	+6	520
12	(United States) Johnny Palmer	69-74-75-77=295	+7	500
13	(United States) Johnny Revolta	71-71-77-77=296	+8	450
T14	(United States) George Fazio	72-71-78-76=297	+9	443
T14	(United States) Claude Harmon (c)	73-74-77-73=297	+9	443
T14	(United States) Chuck Kocsis (a)	75-78-71-73=297	+9	0
T14	(United States) Ted Kroll	74-74-76-73=297	+9	443
T14	(United States) Skee Riegel	75-71-78-73=297	+9	443
T19	(United States) Joe Kirkwood Jr.	71-77-74-76=298	+10	420
T19	(United States) Frank Stranahan (a)	72-74-76-76=298	+10	0
T21	(United States) Doug Ford	71-74-79-75=299	+11	420
T21	(South Africa) Bobby Locke	74-71-79-75=299	+11	420
T21	(United States) Harvie Ward (a)	72-71-78-78=299	+11	0
T24	(United States) Arnold Blum (a)	74-77-77-74=302	+14	0
T24	(United States) Clayton Heafner	76-74-74-78=302	+14	400
T24	(United States) Byron Nelson (c)	72-75-78-77=302	+14	400
T27	(United States) Skip Alexander	71-73-77-82=303	+15	267
T27	(United States) Smiley Quick	73-76-79-75=303	+15	267
T27	(Australia) Norman Von Nida	77-77-73-76=303	+15	267
T30	(United States) Dave Douglas	76-69-81-78=304	+16	200
T30	(United States) Vic Ghezzi	77-77-76-74=304	+16	200
T30	(United States) Ed Oliver	72-72-77-83=304	+16	200
T30	(United States) Horton Smith (c)	74-73-77-80=304	+16	200
T34	(United States) Charlie Bassler	74-75-79-77=305	+17	200
T34	(Canada) Stan Leonard	75-76-75-79=305	+17	200
T34	(United States) Al Mengert (a)	74-77-78-76=305	+17	0
T34	(United States) Earl Stewart	75-80-75-75=305	+17	200
T38	(United States) Ed Furgol	74-77-78-77=306	+18	200
T38	(United States) Chandler Harper	76-74-79-77=306	+18	200
T40	(United States) Bob Hamilton	80-71-81-75=307	+19	200
T40	(United States) Bob Toski	80-72-78-77=307	+19	200
T42	(United States) Walter Burkemo	80-74-76-78=308	+20	200
T42	(United States) Johnny Dawson (a)	74-78-78-78=308	+20	0
T42	(United States) Marty Furgol	73-76-79-80=308	+20	200
T42	(United States) Bobby Knowles (a)	78-77-79-74=308	+20	0
T46	(United States) Charles Coe (a)	80-76-81-72=309	+21	0
T46	(United States) Dow Finsterwald	72-72-83-82=309	+21	200
T46	(United States) Sam Urzetta (a)	78-73-76-82=309	+21	0
T49	(United States) Ray Gafford	69-80-81-80=310	+22	200
T49	(United States) Billy Maxwell (a)	77-77-77-79=310	+22	0
T49	(United States) Denny Shute	74-77-78-81=310	+22	200
T52	(United States) Bill Goodloe (a)	77-71-77-86=311	+23	0
T52	(United States) Henry Picard (c)	76-77-78-80=311	+23	200
54	(United States) Reggie Myles	77-75-80-80=312	+24	200
T55	(United States) Ted Bishop (a)	82-75-81-75=313	+25	0
T55	(United States) Al Brosch	76-74-85-78=313	+25	200
T55	(United States) Dick Chapman (a)	72-79-80-82=313	+25	0
T55	(United States) Robert Sweeny Jr. (a)	74-77-79-83=313	+25	0
59	(United States) Craig Wood (c)	73-81-80-80=314	+26	200
60	(United States) Tommy Jacobs (a)	79-81-77-79=316	+28	0
61	(United States) Jimmy Frisina (a)	74-79-88-81=322	+34	0
WD	(United States) Jim McHale Jr. (a)	72-77-81=230	+14	
WD	(United States) Jimmy Demaret (c)	77-76=153	+9	
WD	(France) Albert Pélissier	78-80=158	+14	
WD	(United States) Bud Ward	74	+2	
WD	(United States) Jess Sweetser (a)	84	+12	
WD	(United States) Billy Burke			
WD	(United States) Lawson Little			
WD	(United States) Fred McLeod			
WD	(United States) Gene Sarazen (c)			
WD	(United States) Buck White			
DQ	(United States) Johnny Bulla	77	+5	

==== Scorecard ====
Final round

Hole	1	2	3	4	5	6	7	8	9	10	11	12	13	14	15	16	17	18
Par	4	5	4	3	4	3	4	5	4	4	4	3	5	4	5	3	4	4
(United States) Snead	−2	−2	−2	−3	−3	−3	−3	−2	−1	−2	−1	E	−1	−1	−1	−1	−1	−2
(United States) Burke	+6	+5	+4	+4	+4	+4	+4	+4	+3	+3	+3	+3	+2	+2	+2	+2	+2	+2
(United States) Besselink	+1	+2	+1	+2	+3	+2	+2	+2	+1	+2	+2	+2	+3	+3	+2	+3	+3	+3
(United States) Bolt	+1	−1	−1	−1	E	E	E	E	+1	+1	+1	+1	−1	−1	E	+1	+3	+3
(United States) Ferrier	+3	+3	+2	+2	+3	+2	+2	+2	+2	+3	+3	+4	+4	+4	+3	+3	+3	+3
(United States) Hogan	−1	−1	−1	E	+1	+1	+1	+1	+1	+1	+1	+1	+1	+2	+3	+4	+4	+5
(United States) Middlecoff	+1	+1	+2	+2	+3	+3	+3	+4	+5	+5	+5	+5	+4	+4	+6	+6	+6	+6
