= 1951 Masters Tournament =

- Front cover of the 1951 Masters Guide

Tournament information
- Dates: April 5–8, 1951
- Location: Augusta, Georgia; 33.503°N 82.020°W
- Course: Augusta National Golf Club
- Organized by: Augusta National Golf Club
- Tour: PGA Tour

Statistics
- Par: 72
- Field: 64 players
- Cut: None
- Prize fund: $15,000
- Winner's share: $3,000

Champion
- (United States) Ben Hogan
- 280 (−8)

Location map
- Location in the United States Location in Georgia

The 1951 Masters Tournament was the 15th Masters Tournament, held April 5–8 at Augusta National Golf Club in Augusta, Georgia. Ben Hogan, age 38, won the first of his two Masters titles, two strokes ahead of runner-up Skee Riegel. It was the fifth of his nine major titles.

After three rounds, Hogan was one stroke out of the lead, behind Riegel and Sam Snead, the 1949 champion. Hogan shot a bogey-free final round of 68 (−4), while Riegel carded a 71 and Snead an 80 (+8). Prior to this victory, Hogan had eight top ten finishes at the Masters, twice as runner-up in 1942 and 1946.

The reigning U.S. Open champion, Hogan also won the year's next major, the 1951 U.S. Open.

With high attendance of about 15,000 on Sunday, a fifty percent bonus for the prize money was declared, boosting the purse to $15,000 and the winner's share to $3,000. Ticket prices were raised to $10 that year.

== Field ==
1. Masters champions

Jimmy Demaret (9,10,12), Claude Harmon, Herman Keiser (9), Byron Nelson (2,6,9), Gene Sarazen (2,4,6,9), Horton Smith (9), Sam Snead (4,6,9,10)

- Ralph Guldahl (2), Henry Picard (6,9,10,12) and Craig Wood (2) did not play.

2. U.S. Open champions

Johnny Farrell, Ben Hogan (6,9,10), Lawson Little (3,5,9), Lloyd Mangrum (9,10,12), Fred McLeod, Cary Middlecoff (9,10), Lew Worsham

3. U.S. Amateur champions

Dick Chapman (8,a), Charles Coe (8,a), Skee Riegel (9,10), Sam Urzetta (8,11,a), George Von Elm

4. British Open champions

Denny Shute (6)

5. British Amateur champions

Frank Stranahan (8,9,11,a), Robert Sweeny Jr. (a)

6. PGA champions

Jim Ferrier (9,10), Vic Ghezzi (9), Chandler Harper (12), Johnny Revolta

7. Members of the U.S. 1951 Ryder Cup team

- Team not selected in time for inclusion.

8. Members of the U.S. 1951 Walker Cup team

William C. Campbell (a), Dow Finsterwald, Bill Goodloe (a), Bobby Knowles (11,a), Jim McHale Jr. (a), Harold Paddock Jr. (a), Harvie Ward (a)

- Willie Turnesa (a) did not play. Finsterwald, Goodloe and Ward were reserves for the team.

9. Top 24 players and ties from the 1950 Masters Tournament

George Fazio (10), Leland Gibson, Fred Haas (10), Chick Harbert, Clayton Heafner, Joe Kirkwood Jr. (10), Johnny Palmer (10,12), Toney Penna

- Skip Alexander (10) did not play.

10. Top 24 players and ties from the 1950 U.S. Open

Al Besselink, Julius Boros, Johnny Bulla, Marty Furgol, Dutch Harrison, Dick Mayer, Bill Nary, Henry Ransom, Bob Toski, Harold Williams

- Dick Metz did not play.

11. 1950 U.S. Amateur quarter-finalists

Bill Shields (a), Tom Veech (a), John Ward (a)

- Bud Holscher (a) and Dick Kinchla (a) did not play.

12. 1950 PGA Championship quarter-finalists

Dave Douglas, Ray Gafford, Henry Williams Jr.

13. One amateur, not already qualified, selected by a ballot of ex-U.S. Amateur champions

- Johnny Dawson (a) was selected but did not play.

14. One professional, not already qualified, selected by a ballot of ex-U.S. Open champions

Jack Burke Jr.

15. Two players, not already qualified, with the best scoring average in the winter part of the 1951 PGA Tour

Ed Furgol, Ted Kroll

16. Foreign invitations

Roberto De Vicenzo (9), Tony Holguin, Bill Mawhinney, Juan Segura (a)

- Numbers in brackets indicate categories that the player would have qualified under had they been American.

== Round summaries ==
=== First round ===
Thursday, April 5, 1951

Place	Player	Score	To par
1	(United States) George Fazio	68	−4
T2	(United States) Lloyd Mangrum	69	−3
T2	(United States) Sam Snead	69	−3
4	(United States) Ben Hogan	70	−2
T5	(United States) Johnny Bulla	71	−1
T5	(United States) Dick Mayer	71	−1
T5	(United States) Byron Nelson	71	−1
T5	(United States) Lew Worsham	71	−1
T9	(United States) Dick Chapman (a)	72	E
T9	(United States) Lawson Little	72	E
T9	(Argentina) Juan Segura (a)	72	E

=== Second round ===
Friday, April 6, 1951

Place	Player	Score	To par
1	(United States) Skee Riegel	73-68=141	−3
T2	(United States) George Fazio	68-74=142	−2
T2	(United States) Ben Hogan	70-72=142	−2
T2	(United States) Lew Worsham	71-71=142	−2
T5	(United States) Johnny Bulla	71-72=143	−1
T5	(United States) Dave Douglas	74-69=143	−1
T5	(United States) Lloyd Mangrum	69-74=143	−1
T5	(United States) Sam Snead	69-74=143	−1
T9	(United States) Jim Ferrier	74-70=144	E
T9	(United States) Joe Kirkwood, Jr.	73-71=144	E
T9	(United States) Byron Nelson	71-73=144	E

=== Third round ===
Saturday, April 7, 1951

Place	Player	Score	To par
T1	(United States) Skee Riegel	73-68-70=211	−5
T1	(United States) Sam Snead	69-74-68=211	−5
3	(United States) Ben Hogan	70-72-70=212	−4
4	(United States) Lloyd Mangrum	69-74-70=213	−3
5	(United States) Lew Worsham	71-71-72=214	−2
T6	(United States) Cary Middlecoff	73-73-69=215	−1
T6	(United States) Dave Douglas	74-69-72=215	−1
T8	(United States) Johnny Bulla	71-72-73=216	E
T8	(United States) George Fazio	68-74-74=216	E
T10	(United States) Bill Goodloe (a)	74-71-72=217	+1
T10	(United States) Lawson Little	72-73-72=217	+1
T10	(United States) Byron Nelson	71-73-73=217	+1

=== Final round ===
Sunday, April 8, 1951

==== Final leaderboard ====
Champion
Silver Cup winner (low amateur)
(a) = amateur
(c) = past champion

Top 10
Place	Player	Score	To par	Money (US$)
1	(United States) Ben Hogan	70-72-70-68=280	−8	3,000
2	(United States) Skee Riegel	73-68-70-71=282	−6	1,875
T3	(United States) Lloyd Mangrum	69-74-70-73=286	−2	1,163
T3	(United States) Lew Worsham	71-71-72-72=286	−2	1,163
5	(United States) Dave Douglas	74-69-72-73=288	E	750
6	(United States) Lawson Little	72-73-72-72=289	+1	600
7	(United States) Jim Ferrier	74-70-74-72=290	+2	525
T8	(United States) Johnny Bulla	71-72-73-75=291	+3	450
T8	(United States) Byron Nelson (c)	71-73-73-74=291	+3	450
T8	(United States) Sam Snead (c)	69-74-68-80=291	+3	450

Leaderboard below the top 10
Place	Player	Score	To par	Money ($)
11	(United States) Jack Burke Jr.	73-72-74-73=292	+4	390
T12	(United States) Charles Coe (a)	76-71-73-73=293	+5	0
T12	(United States) Cary Middlecoff	73-73-69-78=293	+5	356
T12	(United States) Gene Sarazen (c)	75-73-74-71=293	+5	356
T15	(United States) Ed Furgol	80-71-72-71=294	+6	338
T15	(United States) Dutch Harrison	76-71-76-71=294	+6	338
17	(United States) Julius Boros	76-72-74-73=295	+7	338
T18	(United States) George Fazio	68-74-74-80=296	+8	315
T18	(United States) Bob Toski	75-73-73-75=296	+8	315
T20	(United States) Al Besselink	76-73-71-77=297	+9	308
T20	(United States) Dick Chapman (a)	72-76-72-77=297	+9	0
T20	(Argentina) Roberto De Vicenzo	75-74-74-74=297	+9	308
T20	(United States) Clayton Heafner	74-72-73-78=297	+9	308
T20	(United States) Joe Kirkwood Jr.	73-71-78-75=297	+9	308
T25	(United States) Ted Kroll	76-75-71-76=298	+10	150
T25	(United States) Dick Mayer	71-75-79-73=298	+10	150
T25	(United States) Bill Nary	76-73-73-76=298	+10	150
T25	(United States) Henry Ransom	74-74-74-76=298	+10	150
T25	(United States) Sam Urzetta (a)	73-72-78-75=298	+10	0
T30	(United States) Jimmy Demaret (c)	76-74-78-71=299	+11	
T30	(United States) Johnny Palmer	73-74-77-75=299	+11	
T32	(United States) Leland Gibson	74-74-75-78=301	+13	
T32	(United States) Horton Smith (c)	79-77-70-75=301	+13	
T32	(United States) Frank Stranahan (a)	74-74-74-79=301	+13	
T35	(United States) Marty Furgol	77-76-73-76=302	+14	
T35	(United States) Claude Harmon (c)	75-77-74-76=302	+14	
T35	(United States) Jim McHale Jr. (a)	75-76-76-75=302	+14	
T35	(United States) Harvie Ward (a)	74-77-77-74=302	+14	
T39	(United States) Fred Haas	79-76-73-75=303	+15	
T39	(Mexico) Tony Holguin	78-72-75-78=303	+15	
T39	(United States) Herman Keiser (c)	77-73-79-74=303	+15	
T42	(United States) Bill Goodloe (a)	74-71-72-88=305	+17	
T42	(United States) Johnny Revolta	74-75-75-81=305	+17	
T44	(United States) Ray Gafford	77-73-76-80=306	+18	
T44	(United States) Chick Harbert	76-73-77-80=306	+18	
46	(United States) Harold Williams	76-77-76-78=307	+19	
T47	(United States) Denny Shute	79-76-79-74=308	+20	
T47	(United States) Henry Williams Jr.	77-76-77-78=308	+20	
49	(United States) Harold Paddock Jr. (a)	75-78-80-79=312	+24	
T50	(United States) Dow Finsterwald (a)	76-81-75-81=313	+25	
T50	(United States) Bobby Knowles (a)	78-79-75-81=313	+25	
T50	(Argentina) Juan Segura (a)	72-80-79-82=313	+25	
T50	(United States) Bill Shields (a)	82-76-76-79=313	+25	
T50	(United States) George Von Elm	77-76-79-81=313	+25	
T55	(Canada) Bill Mawhinney (a)	83-75-73-84=315	+27	
T55	(United States) Robert Sweeny Jr. (a)	80-79-78-78=315	+27	
T57	(United States) Johnny Farrell	81-78-83-76=318	+30	
T57	(United States) John Ward (a)	78-75-81-84=318	+30	
59	(United States) William C. Campbell (a)	79-82-74-86=321	+33	
WD	(United States) Chandler Harper	77-72-76=225	+9	
WD	(United States) Vic Ghezzi	81-76-74=231	+15	
WD	(United States) Tom Veech (a)	80-79-77=236	+20	
WD	(United States) Toney Penna	80-78-84=242	+26	
WD	(United States) Fred McLeod	86-88=174	+30	

==== Scorecard ====
Hole	1	2	3	4	5	6	7	8	9	10	11	12	13	14	15	16	17	18
Par	4	5	4	3	4	3	4	5	4	4	4	3	5	4	5	3	4	4
(United States) Hogan	−4	−5	−6	−6	−6	−6	−6	−7	−7	−7	−7	−7	−8	−8	−8	−8	−8	−8
(United States) Riegel	−5	−6	−5	−5	−6	−6	−5	−6	−5	−5	−4	−4	−5	−5	−5	−5	−6	−6
(United States) Mangrum	−3	−4	−4	−4	−3	−2	−3	−3	−3	−3	−3	−1	−1	E	−1	−2	−2	−2
(United States) Worsham	−2	−2	−2	−2	−2	−2	−2	−1	−1	−1	−1	−2	−2	−2	−2	−2	−1	−2
(United States) Douglas	−1	−3	−3	−2	−1	−2	−2	−2	−3	−2	−2	E	−1	E	E	E	E	E
(United States) Snead	−5	−5	−4	−4	−4	−4	−4	−4	−4	−3	+1	+1	E	E	+1	+2	+2	+2
(United States) Middlecoff	−1	−2	−1	−1	−1	−1	−1	−1	−1	E	E	+1	+3	+4	+5	+5	+5	+5

Cumulative tournament scores, relative to par

Eagle	Birdie	Bogey	Double bogey	Triple bogey +
