= 1953 Masters Tournament =

- Front cover of the 1953 Masters Guide

Tournament information
- Dates: April 9–12, 1953
- Location: Augusta, Georgia; 33.503°N 82.020°W
- Course: Augusta National Golf Club
- Organized by: Augusta National Golf Club
- Tour: PGA Tour

Statistics
- Par: 72
- Length: 6,950 yards (6,355 m)
- Field: 71 players
- Cut: None
- Winner's share: $4,000

Champion
- (United States) Ben Hogan
- 274 (−14)

Location map
- Location in the United States Location in Georgia

The 1953 Masters Tournament was the 17th Masters Tournament, held April 9–12 at Augusta National Golf Club in Augusta, Georgia.

Ben Hogan shattered the Masters scoring record by five strokes with a 274 (−14), which stood for twelve years, until Jack Nicklaus' 271 in 1965. Hogan shot four rounds of 70 or better, and went on to win the U.S. Open by six strokes in June and the British Open by four in July. Through 2022, it remains the only time these three majors were won in the same calendar year.

Hogan, age forty, led by four strokes after 54 holes and finished five ahead of runner-up Ed Oliver to win his second Masters, the seventh of his nine major titles. This win was commemorated five years later in 1958 with the dedication of the Hogan Bridge over Rae's Creek at the par-3 12th hole.

Hogan was the first Masters winner over age forty; a few months older than Hogan, Sam Snead won the next year at 41.

== Course ==
| Hole | Yards | Par | Hole | Yards | Par |
|---|---|---|---|---|---|
| 1 | 400 | 4 | 10 | 470 | 4 |
| 2 | 555 | 5 | 11 | 445 | 4 |
| 3 | 355 | 4 | 12 | 155 | 3 |
| 4 | 220 | 3 | 13 | 470 | 5 |
| 5 | 450 | 4 | 14 | 420 | 4 |
| 6 | 190 | 3 | 15 | 505 | 5 |
| 7 | 365 | 4 | 16 | 190 | 3 |
| 8 | 520 | 5 | 17 | 400 | 4 |
| 9 | 420 | 4 | 18 | 420 | 4 |
| Out | 3,475 | 36 | In | 3,475 | 36 |
| Source: | | | Total | 6,950 | 72 |

== Field ==
1. Masters champions

Jimmy Demaret (10), Claude Harmon (9), Ben Hogan (2,6,9,10), Byron Nelson (2,6,9), Henry Picard (6), Gene Sarazen (2,4,6), Horton Smith (10), Sam Snead (4,6,9,10), Craig Wood (2)

- Ralph Guldahl (2) and Herman Keiser did not play.

2. U.S. Open champions

Julius Boros (9,10), Billy Burke, Olin Dutra (6), Chick Evans (3,a), Lloyd Mangrum (9,10), Fred McLeod, Cary Middlecoff (9,10,12), Sam Parks Jr., Lew Worsham (9,10)

3. U.S. Amateur champions

Dick Chapman (5,a), Charles Coe (a), Skee Riegel (9), Jess Sweetser (5,a), Jack Westland (11,a)

4. British Open champions

Jock Hutchison (6), Denny Shute (6)

5. British Amateur champions

Frank Stranahan (9,a), Robert Sweeny Jr. (a), Harvie Ward (9,a)

6. PGA champions

Jim Ferrier (9), Vic Ghezzi, Bob Hamilton (12), Chandler Harper, Johnny Revolta (9), Jim Turnesa (12)

7. Members of the U.S. 1953 Ryder Cup team

- Team not selected in time for inclusion

8. Members of the U.S. 1953 Walker Cup team

- Team not selected in time for inclusion

9. Top 24 players and ties from the 1952 Masters Tournament

Al Besselink, Arnold Blum (a), Tommy Bolt (10), Jack Burke Jr., George Fazio (10), Doug Ford (10), Fred Hawkins, Clayton Heafner, Joe Kirkwood Jr., Chuck Kocsis (a), Ted Kroll (10,12), Johnny Palmer

10. Top 24 players and ties from the 1952 U.S. Open

Al Brosch, Johnny Bulla, Clarence Doser (12), Leland Gibson, Chick Harbert (12), Jimmy Jackson (a), Milon Marusic, Dick Metz, Ed Oliver, Earl Stewart, Harry Todd, Felice Torza, Bill Trombley, Bo Wininger

- Paul Runyan (6) did not play.

11. 1952 U.S. Amateur quarter-finalists

Don Cherry (a), Al Mengert

- Gene Littler (a), Jim McHale Jr. (a) and Dick Yost (a) did not play.

12. 1952 PGA Championship quarter-finalists

Frank Champ, Fred Haas

13. One amateur, not already qualified, selected by a ballot of ex-U.S. Amateur champions

William C. Campbell (a)

14. One professional, not already qualified, selected by a ballot of ex-U.S. Open champions

Skip Alexander

15. Two players, not already qualified, with the best scoring average in the winter part of the 1953 PGA Tour

Jerry Barber, Dick Mayer

16. Foreign invitations

John de Bendern (5,a), Ricardo Rossi, Peter Thomson

== Round summaries ==
=== First round ===
Thursday, April 9, 1953

| Place | Player | Score | To par |
|---|---|---|---|
| 1 | (United States) Chick Harbert | 68 | −4 |
| T2 | (United States) Al Besselink | 69 | −3 |
| T2 | (United States) Ed Oliver | 69 | −3 |
| T4 | (United States) Ben Hogan | 70 | −2 |
| T4 | (United States) Milan Marusic | 70 | −2 |
| T6 | (United States) Tommy Bolt | 71 | −1 |
| T6 | (United States) Bob Hamilton | 71 | −1 |
| T6 | (United States) Ted Kroll | 71 | −1 |
| T6 | (United States) Sam Snead | 71 | −1 |
| T10 | (United States) Skip Alexander | 72 | E |
| T10 | (United States) Dick Chapman (a) | 72 | E |
| T10 | (United States) Frank Stranahan (a) | 72 | E |

=== Second round ===
Friday, April 10, 1953

| Place | Player | Score | To par |
|---|---|---|---|
| 1 | (United States) Ben Hogan | 70-69=139 | −5 |
| 2 | (United States) Bob Hamilton | 71-69=140 | −4 |
| T3 | (United States) Chick Harbert | 68-73=141 | −3 |
| T3 | (United States) Ted Kroll | 71-70=141 | −3 |
| T5 | (United States) Lloyd Mangrum | 74-68=142 | −2 |
| T5 | (United States) Milan Marusic | 70-72=142 | −2 |
| T5 | (United States) Ed Oliver | 69-73=142 | −2 |
| T8 | (United States) Al Besselink | 69-75=144 | E |
| T8 | (United States) Julius Boros | 73-71=144 | E |
| T8 | (United States) Leland Gibson | 73-71=144 | E |
| T8 | (United States) Lew Worsham | 74-70=144 | E |

=== Third round ===
Saturday, April 11, 1953

With a 66 (−6), 1951 champion Ben Hogan set the 54-hole scoring record at 205 (−11).

| Place | Player | Score | To par |
|---|---|---|---|
| 1 | (United States) Ben Hogan | 70-69-66=205 | −11 |
| 2 | (United States) Ed Oliver | 69-73-67=209 | −7 |
| 3 | (United States) Bob Hamilton | 71-69-70=210 | −6 |
| 4 | (United States) Chick Harbert | 68-73-70=211 | −5 |
| 5 | (United States) Lloyd Mangrum | 74-68-71=213 | −3 |
| T6 | (United States) Al Besselink | 69-75-70=214 | −2 |
| T6 | (United States) Tommy Bolt | 71-75-68=214 | −2 |
| T6 | (United States) Ted Kroll | 71-70-73=214 | −2 |
| 9 | (United States) Chandler Harper | 74-72-69=215 | −1 |
| T10 | (United States) Jack Burke Jr. | 78-69-69=216 | E |
| T10 | (United States) Leland Gibson | 73-71-72=216 | E |
| T10 | (United States) Dick Mayer | 73-72-71=216 | E |
| T10 | (United States) Dick Metz | 73-72-71=216 | E |
| T10 | (United States) Frank Stranahan (a) | 72-75-69=216 | E |
| T10 | (United States) Harvie Ward (a) | 73-74-69=216 | E |

=== Final round ===
Sunday, April 12, 1953

==== Final leaderboard ====
Champion
Silver Cup winner (low amateur)
(a) = amateur
(c) = past champion

Top 10
| Place | Player | Score | To par | Money (US$) |
|---|---|---|---|---|
| 1 | (United States) Ben Hogan (c) | 70-69-66-69=274 | −14 | 4,000 |
| 2 | (United States) Ed Oliver | 69-73-67-70=279 | −9 | 2,500 |
| 3 | (United States) Lloyd Mangrum | 74-68-71-69=282 | −6 | 1,700 |
| 4 | (United States) Bob Hamilton | 71-69-70-73=283 | −5 | 1,400 |
| T5 | (United States) Tommy Bolt | 71-75-68-71=285 | −3 | 900 |
| T5 | (United States) Chick Harbert | 68-73-70-74=285 | −3 | 900 |
| 7 | (United States) Ted Kroll | 71-70-73-72=286 | −2 | 700 |
| 8 | (United States) Jack Burke Jr. | 78-69-69-71=287 | −1 | 650 |
| 9 | (United States) Al Besselink | 69-75-70-74=288 | E | 600 |
| T10 | (United States) Julius Boros | 73-71-75-70=289 | +1 | 523 |
| T10 | (United States) Chandler Harper | 74-72-69-74=289 | +1 | 523 |
| T10 | (United States) Fred Hawkins | 75-70-74-70=289 | +1 | 523 |

Leaderboard below the top 10
| Place | Player | Score | To par | Money ($) |
|---|---|---|---|---|
| 13 | (United States) Johnny Palmer | 74-73-72-71=290 | +2 | 450 |
| T14 | (United States) Frank Stranahan (a) | 72-75-69-75=291 | +3 | 0 |
| T14 | (United States) Harvie Ward (a) | 73-74-69-75=291 | +3 | 0 |
| T16 | (United States) Charles Coe (a) | 75-74-72-71=292 | +4 | 0 |
| T16 | (United States) Jim Ferrier | 74-71-76-71=292 | +4 | 443 |
| T16 | (United States) Dick Mayer | 73-72-71-76=292 | +4 | 443 |
| T16 | (United States) Sam Snead (c) | 71-75-71-75=292 | +4 | 443 |
| T16 | (United States) Earl Stewart | 75-72-70-75=292 | +4 | 443 |
| T21 | (United States) Jerry Barber | 73-76-72-72=293 | +5 | 425 |
| T21 | (United States) Doug Ford | 73-73-72-75=293 | +5 | 425 |
| T23 | (United States) Leland Gibson | 73-71-72-78=294 | +6 | 407 |
| T23 | (United States) Al Mengert | 77-70-75-72=294 | +6 | 407 |
| T23 | (United States) Dick Metz | 73-72-71-78=294 | +6 | 407 |
| 26 | (United States) Fred Haas | 74-73-71-77=295 | +7 | 400 |
| T27 | (United States) Cary Middlecoff | 75-76-68-77=296 | +8 | 200 |
| T27 | (United States) Jim Turnesa | 73-74-73-76=296 | +8 | 200 |
| T29 | (United States) Skip Alexander | 72-78-74-73=297 | +9 | 200 |
| T29 | (United States) Byron Nelson (c) | 73-73-78-73=297 | +9 | 200 |
| T29 | (United States) Skee Riegel | 74-72-76-75=297 | +9 | 200 |
| T29 | (United States) Felice Torza | 78-73-72-74=297 | +9 | 200 |
| T29 | (United States) Bo Wininger | 80-70-72-75=297 | +9 | 200 |
| T34 | (United States) Clarence Doser | 75-77-71-75=298 | +10 | 200 |
| T34 | (United States) Claude Harmon (c) | 75-73-75-75=298 | +10 | 200 |
| T34 | (United States) Robert Sweeny Jr. (a) | 75-76-72-75=298 | +10 | 0 |
| 37 | (United States) Dick Chapman (a) | 72-77-78-72=299 | +11 | 0 |
| T38 | (United States) Al Brosch | 74-73-78-75=300 | +12 | 200 |
| T38 | (United States) Jimmy Jackson (a) | 75-77-74-74=300 | +12 | 0 |
| T38 | (United States) Milon Marusic | 70-72-77-81=300 | +12 | 200 |
| T38 | (United States) Henry Picard (c) | 73-75-74-78=300 | +12 | 200 |
| T38 | (United States) Gene Sarazen (c) | 75-78-73-74=300 | +12 | 200 |
| T38 | (Australia) Peter Thomson | 77-76-74-73=300 | +12 | 200 |
| 44 | (United States) Lew Worsham | 74-70-77-80=301 | +13 | 200 |
| T45 | (United States) William C. Campbell (a) | 75-78-74-75=302 | +14 | 0 |
| T45 | (United States) Don Cherry (a) | 73-76-79-74=302 | +14 | 0 |
| T45 | (United States) Jimmy Demaret (c) | 73-80-75-74=302 | +14 | 200 |
| T45 | (United States) Chuck Kocsis (a) | 75-75-75-77=302 | +14 | 0 |
| T45 | (United States) Horton Smith (c) | 78-76-72-76=302 | +14 | 200 |
| 50 | (United States) Sam Parks Jr. | 73-76-76-79=304 | +16 | 200 |
| T51 | (United States) Johnny Bulla | 75-77-81-72=305 | +17 | 200 |
| T51 | (United States) George Fazio | 77-74-77-77=305 | +17 | 200 |
| T53 | (United States) Harry Todd | 78-73-75-80=306 | +18 | 200 |
| T53 | (United States) Jack Westland (a) | 81-74-75-76=306 | +18 | 0 |
| T55 | (United States) Arnold Blum (a) | 76-73-77-82=308 | +20 | 0 |
| T55 | (Brazil) Ricardo Rossi | 75-81-80-72=308 | +20 | 200 |
| T55 | (United States) Denny Shute | 78-81-74-75=308 | +20 | 200 |
| 58 | (United States) Johnny Revolta | 77-77-75-81=310 | +22 | 200 |
| T59 | (United States) Frank Champ | 85-72-77-77=311 | +23 | 200 |
| T59 | (United States) Bill Trombley | 78-75-79-79=311 | +23 | 200 |
| 61 | (England) John de Bendern (a) | 80-77-75-80=312 | +24 | 0 |
| 62 | (United States) Craig Wood (c) | 81-78-76-80=315 | +27 | 200 |
| 63 | (United States) Olin Dutra | 80-78-82-78=318 | +30 | 200 |
| 64 | (United States) Chick Evans (a) | 85-79-79-85=328 | +40 | 0 |
| WD | (United States) Vic Ghezzi | 74-77-73=224 | +8 | |
| WD | (United States) Jess Sweetser (a) | 75-78-77=230 | +14 | |
| WD | (United States) Clayton Heafner | 78-74-79=231 | +15 | |
| WD | (United States) Billy Burke | 80-80=160 | +16 | |
| WD | (United States) Jock Hutchison | | | |
| WD | (United States) Joe Kirkwood Jr. | | | |
| WD | (United States) Fred McLeod | | | |

==== Scorecard ====
| Hole | 1 | 2 | 3 | 4 | 5 | 6 | 7 | 8 | 9 | 10 | 11 | 12 | 13 | 14 | 15 | 16 | 17 | 18 |
|---|---|---|---|---|---|---|---|---|---|---|---|---|---|---|---|---|---|---|
| Par | 4 | 5 | 4 | 3 | 4 | 3 | 4 | 5 | 4 | 4 | 4 | 3 | 5 | 4 | 5 | 3 | 4 | 4 |
| (United States) Hogan | −11 | −12 | −12 | −13 | −13 | −12 | −12 | −11 | −11 | −11 | −11 | −11 | −12 | −12 | −13 | −13 | −13 | −14 |
| (United States) Oliver | −7 | −8 | −9 | −9 | −9 | −9 | −9 | −9 | −9 | −8 | −7 | −7 | −8 | −8 | −8 | −8 | −8 | −9 |
| (United States) Mangrum | −2 | −2 | −2 | −2 | −2 | −2 | −2 | −2 | −2 | −2 | −2 | −2 | −3 | −3 | −3 | −4 | −5 | −6 |
| (United States) Hamilton | −5 | −5 | −5 | −5 | −5 | −6 | −6 | −6 | −6 | −5 | −5 | −5 | −4 | −5 | −5 | −4 | −5 | −5 |
| (United States) Bolt | −2 | −3 | −3 | −3 | −3 | −3 | −3 | −3 | −3 | −2 | −2 | −2 | −3 | −3 | −3 | −3 | −3 | −3 |
| (United States) Harbert | −5 | −5 | −5 | −2 | −3 | −2 | −2 | −2 | −3 | −1 | −1 | −1 | −1 | −1 | −1 | −2 | −3 | −3 |

Cumulative tournament scores, relative to par

| Birdie | Bogey | Double bogey | Triple bogey + |
