= Ronnie White (golfer) =

English golfer (1921–2005)

Personal information
- Full name: Ronald James White
- Nationality: England
- Born: 9 April 1921 Wallasey, Cheshire, England
- Died: 17 December 2005 (aged 84) Lancashire, England

Career
- Sport: Golf
- Status: Amateur

Best results in major championships
- Masters Tournament: DNP
- PGA Championship: DNP
- U.S. Open: DNP
- The Open Championship: T31: 1946

Ronald James White (9 April 1921 – 17 December 2005) was an English amateur golfer. He was one of the leading amateur golfers of the post-World War II period. He played in five consecutive Walker Cup matches from 1947 to 1955. In the four matches from 1947 to 1953 Great Britain and Ireland won 12 and halved 3 of the 48 individual matches of which White contributed 6 wins and a half in his 8 matches, winning all his four singles matches.

White was described as being the best amateur golfer during the late 1940s and early 1950s. He announced his retirement from international golf in September 1955 after having lost a singles cup match to American Harvie Ward in May 1955.

== Early life ==
Born in Wallasey on 9 April 1921, White was educated at Merchant Taylors' Boys' School, Crosby.

== Career ==
Although a lawyer by profession, White was reportedly considered as "probably the best golfer in the Isles" in 1949 by American amateur golfer Willie Turnesa. By 1953, he was being described as Britain's number one amateur golfer, after having played in the 1953 English Amateur final at the Royal Birkdale Golf Club. He was a mainstay of the Walker Cup competition in the post-war era. In 1953, he wrote an instructional book which was unusual for a golf amateur, while acknowledging his amateur status by noting that he "is not a teacher of golf".

By May 1955, his credentials were questioned by the Evening Times who noted that he was no longer described as Britain's number one for the reason that he was not making sufficient appearances in major tournaments and could therefore not be judged. White announced in September 1955 that he was to retire from international golf, having participated with each British Walker Cup team since 1947 without losing a singles match. His first loss came in May 1955 to Harvie Ward at St Andrews.

== Tournament wins ==
- 1937 Carris Trophy
- 1947 Daily Telegraph Foursomes Tournament (with Charlie Ward)
- 1948 Lancashire Amateur Championship
- 1949 English Amateur, Golf Illustrated Gold Vase, Daily Telegraph Foursomes Tournament (with Reg Horne)
- 1950 Brabazon Trophy
- 1951 Brabazon Trophy

== Results in major championships ==
| Tournament | 1946 | 1947 | 1948 | 1949 | 1950 | 1951 | 1952 | 1953 | 1954 | 1955 | 1956 | 1957 | 1958 | 1959 | 1960 | 1961 |
|---|---|---|---|---|---|---|---|---|---|---|---|---|---|---|---|---|
| The Amateur Championship | R64 | | | R16 | | | | | | | | | | | | |
| The Open Championship | T31 | | | | | | | | | | | | | | | T38LA |

Note: White only played in the Amateur Championship and the Open Championship.

Did not play

LA = low amateur
"T" indicates a tie for a place
R64, R32, R16 = Round in which player lost in match play

== Team appearances ==
- Walker Cup (representing Great Britain & Ireland): 1947, 1949, 1951, 1953, 1955
