= Daily Telegraph Foursomes Tournament =

Daily Telegraph Foursomes
Tournament information
- Location: England
- Established: 1947
- Month played: September/October
- Final year: 1951

Final champion
- Bill Cox and Walter McLeod

The Daily Telegraph Foursomes Tournament was a golf tournament played in England. The event was held annually from 1947 to 1951, and had total prize money of £2,100.

== Detail ==
32 professionals and 32 leading amateurs were invited and drawn into pairs. Five rounds of foursomes knock-out were played with one round on the first day and two rounds on the second and third days.

== Winners ==
Year	Winners	Country	Venue	Margin of victory	Runners-up	Winner's share (£)	Ref
1947	Charlie Ward & Ronnie White	England; England	Birkdale Golf Club	2&1	(England) Max Faulkner & (Scotland) Donald Cameron	600 (pro)	
1948	Charlie Ward & Gerald Micklem	England; England	Royal Lytham & St Annes Golf Club	19 holes	(Northern Ireland) Fred Daly & (Scotland) Morton Dykes		
1949	Reg Horne & Ronnie White	England; England	Moortown Golf Club	19 holes	(Scotland) Jimmy Adams & (England) Leonard Crawley		
1950	Wally Smithers & Jimmy Bruen	England; Ireland	Formby Golf Club	4&2	(England) Bill Branch & (Wales) Mervyn Jones		
1951	Bill Cox & Walter McLeod	England; Scotland	Ganton Golf Club	19 holes	(Scotland) Jimmy Adams & (Scotland) Charles Lawrie	600 (pro)	
