= Reg Horne =

English golfer (1908–1984)

Personal information
- Full name: Reginald William Horne
- Nationality: England
- Born: 19 July 1908 London, England
- Died: 5 January 1984 (aged 75) Littlestone-on-Sea, England

Career
- Sport: Golf
- Status: Professional
- Professional wins: 5

Best results in major championships
- Masters Tournament: DNP
- PGA Championship: DNP
- U.S. Open: DNP
- The Open Championship: T2: 1947

Reginald William Horne (19 July 1908 – 5 January 1984) was an English professional golfer.

== Career ==
In 1945, he won the News of the World Match Play. Horne won other important events on the British circuit. He nearly won the 1947 Open Championship at Hoylake, scoring a 71 in the final round to catch and overtake players like Henry Cotton and Norman Von Nida as the third round leaders all struggled, but in the end Irishman Fred Daly beat him by one shot. Horne regularly finished in the top thirty of the Open, over the following decade, without ever again coming as close to victory.

== Professional wins ==
- 1945 News of the World Matchplay
- 1948 News Chronicle Tournament (tie with Allan Dailey)
- 1949 Daily Telegraph Foursomes Tournament (with Ronnie White)
- 1952 Silver King Tournament
- 1960 PGA Seniors Championship

== Results in major championships ==
Tournament	1938	1939	1940	1941	1942	1943	1944	1945	1946	1947	1948	1949	1950	1951	1952	1953	1954	1955	1956	1957
The Open Championship	CUT		NT	NT	NT	NT	NT	NT	CUT	T2	T28	T20	T17		T31	T20		T22		T24

Note: Horne only played in The Open Championship.

Top 10
Did not play

NT = No tournament
CUT = missed the half-way cut
"T" indicates a tie for a place

== Team appearances ==
- Ryder Cup: 1947
