= Jimmy Bruen =

Irish golfer (1920–1972)

Personal information
- Full name: James Francis O’Grady Bruen
- Nationality: Ireland
- Born: 8 May 1920 Finaghy, Belfast, Ireland
- Died: 3 May 1972 (aged 51) Cork, Ireland

Career
- Sport: Golf
- Status: Amateur

Best results in major championships (wins: 1)
- Masters Tournament: DNP
- PGA Championship: DNP
- U.S. Open: DNP
- The Open Championship: T13: 1939
- U.S. Amateur: R256: 1949
- British Amateur: Won: 1946

James Francis O’Grady Bruen (8 May 1920 – 3 May 1972) was an Irish amateur golfer. He won the 1946 Amateur Championship and was in the British Walker Cup team in 1938, 1949 and 1951. He is regarded as one of Ireland's leading amateur golfers.

== Early life ==
Bruen was born in Finaghy, Belfast, Ireland on 8 May 1920. He moved to Cork at an early age. He was educated at the Presentation Brothers College, Cork.

== Golf career ==
As a 15-year-old Bruen entered the 1935 Boys Amateur Championship at Royal Aberdeen Golf Club but lost his first match. He entered again the following year at Birkdale Golf Club. He only won his first round match at the 19th hole but won his next five matches more comfortably to reached the final, where he met a Scot, William Innes. The 36-hole was very one-sided. Bruen was 7 up after 9 holes and remained 7 up at the end of the morning round. Bruen continued to dominate in the afternoon and eventually won 11&9, to become the first Irish winner of the championship.

In May 1937 Bruen travelled to Royal St George's Golf Club for his first Amateur Championship. Prior to main event he was runner-up in the St George's Vase and, the following day, in the Prince of Wales Cup. In the Amateur Championship, three day later, he met American Dick Chapman in his first match and lost 2&1. In June, Bruen won the Irish Amateur Close Championship at Ballybunion Golf Club, beating five-times champion, John Burke, in the final. In July, he played in the Irish Open and finished as leading amateur, tied for 6th place. Bruen chose not to play in the Boys Amateur Championship but was selected for the Irish team in the annual amateur international matches, which took place in early September. He then played in the Irish Amateur Open Championship but lost in the first round to J A Flaherty.

The early part of 1938 was dominated by the Walker Cup. Trials were arranged in early May, at which Bruen performed exceptionally well and he was selected for the event in early June at St Andrews. Bruen missed the Amateur Championship in late May. In the Walker Cup foursomes he played with Harry Bentley in the first match. They were 3 down at lunch but recovered to halve the match. On the second day Bruen was again out first against Charlie Yates, who had won the Amateur Championship the previous week. Bruen was again 3 down at lunch and eventually lost 2&1. Despite Bruen's disappointment the match was won 7–4 by the British team with one match halved. This was their first win in the Walker Cup after 9 defeats and they wouldn't win again until 1971. Later in the month, Bruen successfully defended the Irish Amateur Close Championship at Castle Golf Club, beating Redmond Simcox 3&2 in the final.

In July Bruen entered the Open Championship for the first time. He qualified comfortably with rounds of 73 and 76. In the first round at Royal St George's Golf Club he scored 70 to be joint leader but took 80 on the second day. At the time 36 holes were played on the final day and the field was restricted to a maximum of 40. Bruen was tied for 43rd and missed the cut. Later in the month he played in the Irish Open and again finished as leading amateur, tied for 10th place. In the Irish Amateur Open Championship in September he won most of his matches comfortably and beat James Mahon 9&8 in the 36-hole final, becoming the first golfer to win both Irish Amateur titles in the same year since 1911.

Bruen played in the 1939 Amateur Championship at Royal Liverpool Golf Club. He reached the quarter-final where he lost to eventual winner Alex Kyle. In a close match Kyle was 1 up as they reached the final hole, Kyle having won the long 16th with a birdie 4. Kyle put his second shot into a bunker 40 yards from the hole while Bruen was 10 to 12 feet from the hole in two. Kyle then played from under the lip of the bunker to 4 feet and also stymied Bruen. Bruen two-putted and Kyle holed his putt for the match. In the Irish Amateur Close Championship at Rosses Point Golf Club the following month, Bruen again lost at the quarter-final stage, beaten by eventual winner Gerry Owens. In July Bruen played in the Open Championship at St Andrews. In qualifying he had two rounds of 69 on the Old and New Courses to lead the field by 4 strokes. In the Championship itself he had steady rounds of 72-75-75-76 and finished in a tie for 13th place, the leading amateur, despite a 9 at the 6th hole of the final round. In the Irish Open two weeks later, Bruen led after rounds of 66 and 74. On the final day he scored 75 and 81 to drop into 6th place, leading amateur for the third successive year.

With the start of World War II important amateur events in the United Kingdom came to a stop. The Irish Amateur Close Championship was held in 1940 with Bruen losing at the last-16 stage. Thereafter both the Open and Close events were cancelled, resuming in 1946, although some domestic Irish events continued.

Bruen won the first Amateur Championship after the war at Birkdale Golf Club, beating the 1937 champion Robert Sweeny Jr. 4&3 in the 36-hole final. He was the first Irishman to win the title. Such was his power that he broke three iron clubs during the week. Because of work commitments Bruen didn't play in any of the other major events of the season.

In early 1947 Bruen damaged his wrist. He withdrew from consideration for the 1947 Walker Cup team and played no golf for the remainder of 1947 and for the whole of 1948. He resumed golf in early 1949, playing in the amateur international which were held in May. He also played in the Golf Illustrated Gold Vase where he tied for 6th after a disappointing second round. Despite withdrawing from the Amateur Championship, he was chosen for the 1949 Walker Cup team, to be held at Winged Foot Golf Club in Mamaroneck, New York in mid-August. The United States won the match 10–2 with Bruen losing both his matches. Most of the team played in the United States Amateur Championship later in August, Bruen losing in the first round, and they then travelled to Toronto to play an international match before their return home.

After the 1949 Walker Cup, Bruen took more time off from golf, only returning for the 1950 amateur internationals, held that year at Royal St David's Golf Club, Harlech, in late September. The following week he played in the Daily Telegraph Foursomes Tournament at Formby Golf Club. 32 professionals and 32 leading amateurs were invited and drawn into pairs, Bruen being paired with Wally Smithers. They reached the final where they beat Bill Branch and the Welsh amateur Mervyn Jones 4&2.

In April 1951 Bruen took part in the trials for the Walker Cup. He did well enough to be selected for the 10-man team. Bruen was paired with John Llewellyn Morgan of Wales in the foursomes. Bruen had a recurrence of his wrist injury during the match. The match was close until the 8th hole on the afternoon round but, with Bruen's wrist getting worse, the American pair then won 6 holes in a row to win 5&4. Bruen withdrew from the singles.

The 1951 Walker Cup effectively marked the end of Bruen's competitive career. He made attempts to return, entering the Amateur Championship in 1953 and 1954 but withdrawing on both occasions.

== Personal life ==
Bruen married Eleanor Cremin in 1945 and had six children. He ran a successful insurance broking business of James Bruen and Sons Ltd in Cork.

Bruen died from a heart attack in Bon Secours Hospital, Cork on 3 May 1972, five days short of his 52nd birthday.

== Amateur wins ==
- 1936 Boys Amateur Championship
- 1937 Irish Amateur Close Championship
- 1938 Irish Amateur Open Championship, Irish Amateur Close Championship
- 1946 The Amateur Championship
- 1950 Daily Telegraph Foursomes Tournament (with Wally Smithers)

== Major championships ==
=== Wins (1) ===
Year	Championship	Winning score	Runner-up
1946	Amateur Championship	4 & 3	(United States) Robert Sweeny Jr.

=== Results timeline ===
Tournament	1937	1938	1939	1940	1941	1942	1943	1944	1945	1946	1947	1948	1949
Amateur Championship	R128		QF	NT	NT	NT	NT	NT	NT	1			
The Open Championship		CUT	T13 LA	NT	NT	NT	NT	NT	NT				
U.S. Amateur						NT	NT	NT	NT				R256

Note: Bruen only played in the Amateur Championship, the Open Championship and the U.S. Amateur.

Win
Top 10
Did not play

LA = Low amateur
CUT = missed the half-way cut
R256, R128, R64, R32, R16, QF, SF = Round in which player lost in match play
"T" indicates a tie for a place

== Team appearances ==
- Walker Cup (representing Great Britain): 1938 (winners), 1949, 1951
