= Wally Smithers =

English golfer (1904–1993)

Personal information
- Full name: Walter Douglas Smithers
- Nationality: England
- Born: 25 August 1904 Chobham, Surrey, England
- Died: 27 January 1993 (aged 88) Long Ashton, Somerset, England

Career
- Sport: Golf
- Status: Professional
- Professional wins: 6

Best results in major championships
- Masters Tournament: DNP
- PGA Championship: DNP
- U.S. Open: DNP
- The Open Championship: T8: 1949

Walter Douglas Smithers (25 August 1904 – 27 January 1993) was an English professional golfer. He tied for 8th place in the 1949 Open Championship.

== Golf career ==
Smithers was assistant professional at Royal Ottawa Golf Club from 1928 to 1935. Soon after arriving he won the Canadian PGA Assistant's Championship in August 1928, winning by 7 strokes and beating the course record with a 70 in his afternoon round. In 1932, Smithers set a course record of 63 on the Royal Ottawa course. He returned to England in 1935.

On his return to England, Smithers worked as a teacher and caddie at Sunningdale Golf Club where he had been before leaving for Canada. He caused a surprise in the 1936 Open Championship where, as a virtual unknown, he was second in the qualifying behind Henry Cotton and finished tied for 15th place in the Championship itself.

Smithers became the professional at Long Ashton Golf Club in 1948 where he remained until his retirement. After finishing tied for 8th place in the 1949 Open Championship he was in a short list of 20 for the 1949 Ryder Cup team but was not selected for the final 10. Paired with Irish amateur Jimmy Bruen he won the 1950 Daily Telegraph Foursomes Tournament at Formby. Playing with John Fallon, he was also runner-up in the 1954 Goodwin (Sheffield) Foursomes Tournament. In individual tournaments his best performance was joint runner-up in the 1951 Silver King Tournament where he finished two strokes behind Flory Van Donck.

== Tournament wins ==
- 1928 Canadian PGA Assistant's Championship
- 1949 West of England Professional Championship
- 1950 Daily Telegraph Foursomes Tournament (with Jimmy Bruen)
- 1951 West of England Professional Championship
- 1952 West of England Professional Championship
- 1959 West of England Professional Championship

== Results in major championships ==
| Tournament | 1936 | 1937 | 1938 | 1939 | 1940 | 1941 | 1942 | 1943 | 1944 | 1945 | 1946 | 1947 | 1948 | 1949 | 1950 | 1951 | 1952 |
|---|---|---|---|---|---|---|---|---|---|---|---|---|---|---|---|---|---|
| The Open Championship | T15 | CUT | CUT | CUT | NT | NT | NT | NT | NT | NT | CUT | | | T8 | T12 | T28 | T17 |

Note: Smithers only played in The Open Championship.

Top 10
Did not play

NT = No tournament
CUT = missed the half-way cut
"T" indicates a tie for a place
