= Laddie Lucas =

Percy Belgrave Lucas
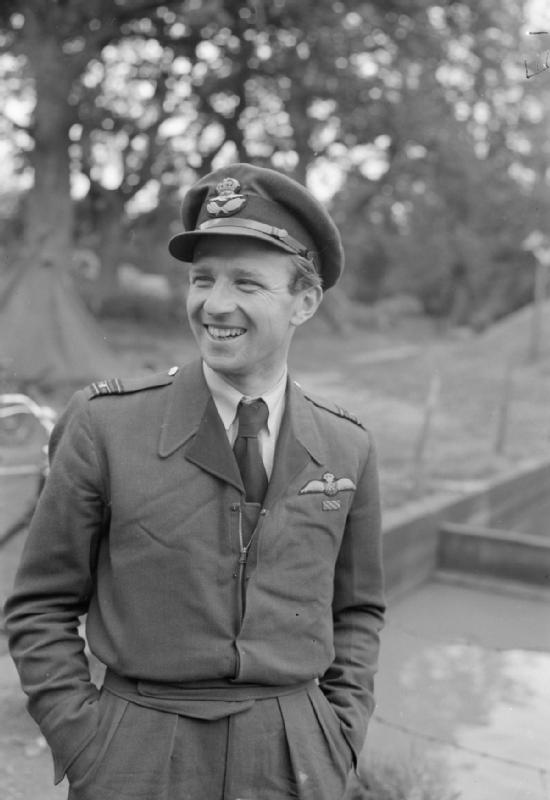
- Lucas as Commanding Officer of No. 616 Squadron RAF during the Second World War
- Born: 2 September 1915; Sandwich Bay, Kent
- Died: 20 March 1998 (aged 82)
- Military career
- Allegiance: United Kingdom
- Branch: Royal Air Force
- Service years: 1940–1945
- Rank: Wing Commander
- Nickname: "Laddie"
- Unit: No. 66 Squadron (1941–42)
- Commands: No. 613 Squadron (1944–45); No. 616 Squadron (1943); No. 249 Squadron (1942)
- Conflicts: World War II
- Awards: Commander of the Order of the British Empire; Distinguished Service Order & Bar; Distinguished Flying Cross

Member of Parliament for Brentford and Chiswick
- In office 23 February 1950 – 8 October 1959
- Preceded by: Francis Noel-Baker
- Succeeded by: Dudley Smith

Percy Belgrave Lucas, CBE, DSO & Bar, DFC (2 September 1915 – 20 March 1998), commonly known as Laddie Lucas, was a Royal Air Force officer, left-handed golfer, author and Member of Parliament (MP).

== Early life and family ==
Lucas was born on 2 September 1915 in the old clubhouse at Prince's Sandwich Bay, Kent, the son of Percy Montagu Lucas, co-founder of Prince's Golf Club, Sandwich. His father died when he was aged 11. A company of Highlanders based nearby often inquired about "the wee laddie" when he was a baby, resulting in his nickname.

Lucas was educated at Stowe School, and Pembroke College, Cambridge, where he read Economics. While at Cambridge, he captained the golf team, was the top amateur in the 1935 Open Championship and was considered the finest left-handed player in the world at the age of 19.

In 1946, Lucas married Jill Addison, the sister of Thelma Bader, wife of fellow flying ace Douglas Bader, of whom he wrote a best-selling biography. The couple had five grandchildren.

== Early career ==
After graduating from Cambridge, Lucas was interviewed by Lord Beaverbrook for a post on the Sunday Express. He impressed Beaverbrook sufficiently that the publisher took him to supper that night and later hired him as a sports writer. He remained with the Sunday Express until the outbreak of war, when he volunteered for the Royal Air Force (RAF).

== Royal Air Force ==
Lucas joined the RAF in June 1940 and went to Canada to undertake flying training at the Flying Training School as part of the Empire Air Training Scheme. On completion of his training, he was assigned to No. 66 Squadron in August 1941, based in Cornwall, where he flew a Spitfire on convoy patrols. He sought a transfer to Burma for more action but ended up at Malta instead, arriving there in February 1942. During the Battle of Malta, he commanded No. 249 Squadron.

In July 1942, Lucas was awarded the Distinguished Flying Cross. The citation read:

Acting Squadron Leader Percy Belgrave LUCAS (100626), Royal Air Force Volunteer Reserve, No. 249 Squadron
In July, 1942, Squadron Leader Lucas displayed great courage in an engagement against 3 bombers escorted by 14 fighters. He unhesitatingly led his squadron through the enemy's fighter escort and, diving down, they destroyed all 3 bombers, 2 of them falling in flames. Squadron Leader Lucas has destroyed 3 hostile aircraft and damaged 7 others.

In the autumn of 1942, Lucas was assigned as aide-de-camp to the Duke of Kent, but gave it up to his friend Michael Strutt, who was already acquainted with the duke. Two weeks later, on 25 August 1942, both were killed in an air crash when the Short Sunderland flying boat in which Strutt was also a passenger crashed into a hillside near Dunbeath, Caithness, in bad weather. This tragedy troubled Lucas.

In 1943, he took command of No. 616 Squadron; later, he commanded the Spitfire wing at RAF Coltishall. Lucas was awarded the Distinguished Service Order (DSO) in January 1944. The citation read:

Acting Wing Commander Percy Belgrave LUCAS, DFC (100626), Royal Air Force Volunteer Reserve
Within the past few months this officer has led his fighter squadron a large number of varied sorties including escorts to bomber formations which have attacked enemy shipping with much success. In all these operations, 13 enemy air-craft [sic] have been destroyed and several others damaged. Much of the success can be attributed to this officer's great skill and gallant leadership. He has rendered most valuable service.

After an imposed rest period on ground duties, "flying a desk", in December 1944 Lucas asked to be given charge of an operational squadron again. After re-training on the two-crew Mosquito, Lucas took over command of No. 613 Squadron (City of Manchester) Squadron equipped with Mosquitos and based at Cambrai-Épinoy in France (Nord department). He immediately resumed his practice of "leading from the front", which gained the respect of the highly experienced squadron air crews. The squadron was involved in low-level tactical support missions and strikes. Between 1944 and 1945, he served with RAF Second Tactical Air Force in North-West Europe. He was awarded a Bar to his DSO in October 1945 for making numerous attacks on enemy communications, often in appalling weather conditions. He resigned his commission in 1945.

== Postwar career ==
After the war, he was encouraged to fight the 1945 general election as a Conservative and stood for Fulham West, where he lost to the sitting Member of Parliament (MP), Edith Summerskill, one of Labour's most prominent women in government following their landslide. At the 1950 general election, he was elected as Conservative MP for Brentford and Chiswick. He held the seat at the next two elections, but retired at the 1959 general election.

He wrote a popular column for the Sunday Express, and authored several books on golf and airmen around the world, as well as an idiosyncratic but much-admired history of the Second World War Siege of Malta.

Lucas played in the 1947 and 1949 Great Britain & Ireland Walker Cup team, being the captain in 1949. After the war, he was an administrator on the Sports Council. Although an amateur, he was influential in the founding of the professional tour in Europe in the early 1970s. At the time of his death, he was serving as a vice-president of both the Golf Foundation and the Association of Golf Writers.

In 1957 he became the Managing Director of the Greyhound Racing Association replacing Francis Gentle who remained as Chairman of the company.

He was made a Commander of the Order of the British Empire in 1981.

In April 1984, Eamonn Andrews surprised Lucas for This Is Your Life.

Lucas died at home in Chelsea on 20 March 1998.

== Memorials ==
There is a commemorative plaque at Prince's Golf Club, Sandwich by the 3rd tee on the Himalayas course which marks the spot where Lucas used his local knowledge of the course to make an emergency landing after his Spitfire was crippled over northern France during the war. A golf tournament for boys and girls aged 8–13 years, the "Laddie Lucas Spoon", is held annually at Prince's.

== Publications ==
- Five Up: A Chronicle of Five Lives (1978)
- The Sport of Princes: Reflections of a Golfer (1980)
- Flying Colours: The Epic Story of Douglas Bader (1981)
- Wings of War: Airmen of All Nations Tell Their Stories (1983)
- Out of the Blue: Role of Luck in Air Warfare, 1917–66 (1985)
- Malta: The Thorn in Rommel's Side – Six Months That Turned the War (1992)
- Voices In The Air 1939–1945
- Thanks for the Memory: Unforgettable Characters in Air Warfare, 1939–45
- Great Battles: Courage in the Skie
- Venturer Courageous: Group Captain Leonard Trent, VC, DFC (with James Sanders)
- Courage in the Skies: Great Air Battles from the Somme to Desert Storm (with Johnnie Johnson)
- Glorious Summer: Story of the Battle of Britain (with Johnnie Johnson)
- Winged Victory: A Last Look Back – The Personal Reflections of Two Royal Air Force Leaders (with Johnnie Johnson)
- The Maltese Spitfire: 1942 – One Pilot and One Plane Searching for the Enemy on Land and Sea (with Harry Coldbeck)
- John Jacobs' Impact on Golf – the man and his methods, 1987

== Team appearances ==
Amateur

- Walker Cup (representing Great Britain & Ireland): 1936, 1947, 1949 (playing captain)

Parliament of the United Kingdom
Preceded by Francis Noel-Baker	Member of Parliament for Brentford and Chiswick; 1950–1959	Succeeded by Dudley Smith
