= Robert Sweeny Jr. =

Personal information
- Full name: Robert John Vincent Sweeny Jr.
- Nickname: Bob or Bobby
- Nationality: United States
- Born: July 25, 1911 Pasadena, California, US
- Died: October 21, 1983 (aged 72)

Career
- Sport: Golf
- Status: Amateur

Best results in major championships (wins: 1)
- Masters Tournament: T34: 1953
- PGA Championship: DNP
- U.S. Open: DNP
- The Open Championship: 33rd: 1939
- U.S. Amateur: 2nd: 1954
- British Amateur: Won: 1937

Robert John Vincent Sweeny Jr. (July 25, 1911 – October 21, 1983) was an American amateur golfer, socialite, businessman and Second World War Royal Air Force bomber pilot. He competed in all four men's major golf championships (which initially included the British Amateur and U.S. Amateur Championships, later replaced by the Masters and PGA Championships), including many Masters and British Opens. In 1937, he won the British Amateur Championship.

== Early life and family ==
Sweeny's paternal grandfather, Charles Sweeny, was an Irish immigrant who made his fortune in mining in the Coeur d'Alene region. "Bob" or "Bobby" was the youngest of four sons of Robert and Teresa Sweeny. Robert Sr. was a successful lawyer in Los Angeles, before moving to New York City in 1916 to pursue business opportunities and enlarge the family fortune. One uncle was Charles Sweeny (1882–1963), a soldier of fortune and officer in various armies.

He and his older brother Charles Francis Sweeny (1909 or 1910–1993) grew up in Manhattan luxury. The brothers attended Loyola School in New York City and Canterbury School in New Milford, Connecticut. The family regularly vacationed in Europe. Robert Sweeny Sr. either joined or in 1926 founded the Federated Trust and Finance Corporation of London, and by the late 1920s, had homes in Wimbledon and Le Touquet.

Bobby followed his brother to Wadham College, Oxford, though it took him over two years to pass the entrance exam.

== Amateur golf career ==
Both brothers competed in the 1927 Boys Amateur Championship; Bobby lost in the fourth round.

When he graduated, he joined Philip Hill and Partners, a London investment banking firm, but showed more interest in his golf.

He made his debut in the Amateur Championship in 1929, shortly before his 18th birthday. In his fourth attempt, he reached the semi-finals in 1935. He lost in the semi-finals of both the 1933 and 1934 Open de France. In 1937, he won the British Amateur Championship and the Golf Illustrated Gold Vase, the latter by seven strokes.

He received one of four foreign invitations to the 3rd Masters Tournament in 1936. He would go on to play in numerous Masters:

- 1936: tied for 44th
- 1940: tied for 39th
- 1949: 52nd
- 1950: tied for 51st
- 1951: tied for 55th
- 1952: tied for 55th
- 1953: tied for 34th
- 1954: 63rd
- 1955: withdrew pre-tournament

Cut instituted in 1957

- 1959: missed cut
- 1960: missed cut
- 1961: missed cut

He also played in many Opens:

- 1932: 44th
- 1934: missed cut
- 1935: 46th
- 1937: missed cut
- 1939: 33rd
- 1946: missed cut
- 1959: missed cut
- 1967: missed cut
- 1968: missed cut
- 1970: missed cut

In 1946, he shared the inaugural Berkshire Trophy with John Beck and lost to Jimmy Bruen in the final of the British Amateur Championship.

In 1954, Arnold Palmer beat him, 1 up, in the U.S. Amateur final. Palmer considered this his first major victory and the "turning point" of his career.

== Second World War ==
Sweeny tried to join the Royal Air Force (RAF) as a fighter pilot, but was turned away as he was considered too old at 28 or 29. He was eventually made adjutant of No. 71 Squadron RAF, but managed to become a bomber pilot, flying the Consolidated B-24 Liberator with No. 224 Squadron RAF. He participated in the sinking of two U-boats in the Bay of Biscay within the space of a few days. In the second clash, Sweeny's Liberator was hit, but he managed to return to base on three engines. For this second action, he was awarded the Distinguished Flying Cross in September 1943.

Flight Lieutenant Sweeny was given a medical discharge on September 27, 1945, retaining the rank of squadron leader.

== Personal life ==
Barbara Hutton, one of the wealthiest women in the world, was in the process of divorcing her second husband in 1938 and 1939. Newspapers speculated whether Sweeny would become her third. They had a serious relationship, but Hutton ended up marrying movie star Cary Grant in 1942.

In 1948, Sweeny met 18-year-old New York debutante Joanne Marie Connelley. Despite their significant age difference, they married the following year. They had two daughters, Sharon (born 1950) and Brenda (born 1952). However, he divorced her in 1953 when she was allegedly caught in a compromising situation with playboy Porfirio Rubirosa.

He is buried in Brookwood Cemetery (Plot 119) next to his brother Charles.
