= Ray Gafford =

American golfer

Personal information
- Full name: Raymond Gafford
- Nationality: United States
- Born: January 22, 1914 Coleman, Texas, U.S.
- Died: February 20, 1990 (aged 76) Fort Worth, Texas, U.S.

Career
- Sport: Golf
- Status: Professional
- Professional wins: 4

Best results in major championships
- Masters Tournament: T44: 1951
- PGA Championship: T5: 1950
- U.S. Open: T19: 1951
- The Open Championship: DNP

Raymond Gafford (January 22, 1914 – February 20, 1990) was an American professional golfer.

Gafford was born in Coleman, Texas. He worked as a club professional at Ridglea Country Club in Fort Worth, Texas from 1937 to 1950 and again from 1954 until his retirement. He worked at Northwood Club in Dallas from 1950 to 1954.

Gafford won the 1946 Oklahoma Open, was a quarterfinalist at the 1950 PGA Championship, and was the first round leader at the 1952 Masters Tournament.

Gafford was inducted into the Texas Golf Hall of Fame in 1983.

== Professional wins ==
this list may be incomplete

- 1943 Southwest Open
- 1944 Southwest Open
- 1946 Oklahoma Open
- 1949 Texas PGA

== Results in major championships ==
Tournament	1939	1940	1941	1942	1943	1944	1945	1946	1947	1948	1949
Masters Tournament					NT	NT	NT				
U.S. Open	WD	CUT	51	NT	NT	NT	NT	T33	CUT	CUT	T42
PGA Championship					NT			R64			R64

Tournament	1950	1951	1952	1953	1954	1955	1956	1957	1958	1959
Masters Tournament		T44	T49							
U.S. Open	CUT	T19	T28	T33	T40					CUT
PGA Championship	QF	R32								

Note: Gafford never played in The Open Championship.

Top 10
Did not play

NT = No tournament
WD = Withdrew
CUT = missed the half-way cut
R64, R32, R16, QF, SF = Round in which player lost in PGA Championship match play
"T" indicates a tie for a place
