= 1951 Walker Cup =

Golf tournament

13th Walker Cup Match
- Dates: 11–12 May 1951
- Venue: Royal Birkdale Golf Club
- Location: Southport, Lancashire, England
- Captains: Raymond Oppenheimer (GB&I); Willie Turnesa (USA)
(United Kingdom) (Republic of Ireland)	3	6	(United States)
- United States wins the Walker Cup

The 1951 Walker Cup, the 13th Walker Cup Match, was played on 11 and 12 May 1951, at Royal Birkdale Golf Club, Southport, Lancashire, England. The United States won by 6 matches to 3 with 3 matches halved.

== Format ==
Four 36-hole matches of foursomes were played on Friday and eight singles matches on Saturday. Each of the 12 matches was worth one point in the larger team competition. If a match was all square after the 36th hole extra holes were not played. The team with most points won the competition. If the two teams were tied, the previous winner would retain the trophy.

== Teams ==
Great Britain & Ireland had a team of 10 plus a non-playing captain. The United States only selected a team of 9, which included a playing captain. Frank Deighton was in the Great Britain & Ireland team but was not selected for any matches.

=== Great Britain & Ireland ===
&
Captain: (England) Raymond Oppenheimer

- (Republic of Ireland) Jimmy Bruen
- (England) Ian Caldwell
- (Republic of Ireland) Joe Carr
- (Scotland) Frank Deighton
- (Republic of Ireland) Cecil Ewing
- (Scotland) Alex Kyle
- (England) John Langley
- (Northern Ireland) Max McCready
- (Wales) John Llewellyn Morgan
- (England) Ronnie White

=== United States ===
Playing captain: Willie Turnesa

- William C. Campbell
- Dick Chapman
- Charles Coe
- Bobby Knowles
- Jim McHale Jr.
- Harold Paddock Jr.
- Frank Stranahan
- Sam Urzetta

== Friday's foursomes ==
Jimmy Bruen, who was paired with John Llewellyn Morgan, had a recurrence of a wrist injury during his match. The match was close until the 8th hole on the afternoon round but, with Bruen's wrist getting worse, the American pair of Turnesa and Urzetta then won 6 holes in a row to win 5&4. Bruen withdrew from the singles.

&	Results
White/Carr	halved	Stranahan/Campbell
Ewing/Langley	halved	Coe/McHale
Kyle/Caldwell	(United States) 1 up	Chapman/Knowles
Bruen/Morgan	(United States) 5 & 4	Turnesa/Urzetta
0	Foursomes	2
0	Overall	2

== Saturday's singles ==
&	Results
Max McCready	(United States) 4 & 3	Sam Urzetta
Joe Carr	(United Kingdom) (Republic of Ireland) 2 & 1	Frank Stranahan
Ronnie White	(United Kingdom) (Republic of Ireland) 2 & 1	Charles Coe
John Langley	(United States) 2 up	Jim McHale Jr.
Cecil Ewing	(United States) 5 & 4	William C. Campbell
Alex Kyle	(United Kingdom) (Republic of Ireland) 2 up	Willie Turnesa
Ian Caldwell	halved	Harold Paddock Jr.
John Llewellyn Morgan	(United States) 7 & 6	Dick Chapman
3	Singles	4
3	Overall	6
