= 1949 Walker Cup =

Golf tournament

12th Walker Cup Match
- Dates: August 19–20, 1949
- Venue: Winged Foot Golf Club
- Location: Mamaroneck, New York
- Captains: Francis Ouimet (USA); Laddie Lucas (GB&I)
(United States)	10	2	(United Kingdom) (Republic of Ireland)
- United States wins the Walker Cup

The 1949 Walker Cup, the 12th Walker Cup Match, was played on August 19 and 20, 1949, on the West course at Winged Foot Golf Club, Mamaroneck, New York. The United States won by 10 matches to 2.

== Format ==
Four 36-hole matches of foursomes were played on Friday and eight singles matches on Saturday. Each of the 12 matches was worth one point in the larger team competition. If a match was all square after the 36th hole extra holes were not played. The team with most points won the competition. If the two teams were tied, the previous winner would retain the trophy.

== Teams ==
Ten players for the United States and Great Britain & Ireland participated in the event. Great Britain & Ireland had a playing captain, while the United States had a non-playing captain. Laddie Lucas, the Great Britain and Ireland playing captain, did not select himself or Bunny Millward for any of the matches.

=== United States ===
Captain: Francis Ouimet

- Ray Billows
- Ted Bishop
- Charles Coe
- Johnny Dawson
- Chuck Kocsis
- Bruce McCormick
- Jim McHale Jr.
- Skee Riegel
- Frank Stranahan
- Willie Turnesa

=== Great Britain & Ireland ===
&
Playing captain: (England) Laddie Lucas

- (Republic of Ireland) Jimmy Bruen
- (Republic of Ireland) Joe Carr
- (Republic of Ireland) Cecil Ewing
- (Northern Ireland) Max McCready
- (England) Gerald Micklem
- (England) Bunny Millward
- (England) Arthur Perowne
- (England) Ken Thom
- (England) Ronnie White

== Friday's foursomes ==
&	Results
Carr/White	(United Kingdom) (Republic of Ireland) 3 & 2	Billows/Turnesa
Bruen/McCready	(United States) 2 & 1	Kocsis/Stranahan
Ewing/Micklem	(United States) 9 & 7	Bishop/Riegal
Thom/Perowne	(United States) 8 & 7	Dawson/McCormick
1	Foursomes	3
1	Overall	3

== Saturday's singles ==
&	Results
Ronnie White	(United Kingdom) (Republic of Ireland) 4 & 3	Willie Turnesa
Max McCready	(United States) 6 & 5	Frank Stranahan
Jimmy Bruen	(United States) 5 & 4	Skee Riegel
Joe Carr	(United States) 5 & 3	Johnny Dawson
Cecil Ewing	(United States) 1 up	Charles Coe
Ken Thom	(United States) 2 & 1	Ray Billows
Arthur Perowne	(United States) 4 & 2	Chuck Kocsis
Gerald Micklem	(United States) 5 & 4	Jim McHale Jr
1	Singles	7
2	Overall	10
