= Harold Paddock Jr. =

American golfer (1920–2000)

Harold D. Paddock Jr.
Personal information
- Full name: Harold Dewolf Paddock Jr.
- Nickname: Hal
- Nationality: United States
- Born: December 17, 1920 Cleveland, Ohio, U.S.
- Died: February 27, 2000 (aged 79) Palm Beach Gardens, Florida, U.S.
- Spouse: Margie Stoneman

Career
- Sport: Golf
- College: University of Southern California
- Turned professional: 1953

Best results in major championships
- Masters Tournament: 49th: 1951
- PGA Championship: CUT: 1960, 1964, 1966
- U.S. Open: CUT: 1948, 1950, 1951, 1952, 1961
- The Open Championship: DNP

Harold Dewolf Paddock Jr. (December 17, 1920 in Cleveland, Ohio – February 27, 2000 in Palm Beach Gardens, Florida) was a well-known amateur golfer in the northeast Ohio area, having won the Ohio Amateur Championship in 1948 and 1950, and was a member of the 1951 Walker Cup team. Paddock turned pro shortly thereafter and played professionally. Paddock lived in Aurora, Ohio from 1955 until he relocated permanently to Florida after the death of his wife, Margie (née Stoneman). The Paddock family owned and operated the Aurora Country Club and the Moreland Hills Country Club (both now closed), in the suburban Cleveland area.

Paddock was inducted into the Northern Ohio Golf Hall of Fame, along with his father, golf course architect Harold Dewolf Paddock Sr. (1888–1969) in 2006, both being recognized for their many achievements and contributions to the game of golf in northern Ohio.

== U.S. national team appearances ==
Amateur

- Walker Cup: 1951 (winners)
