= Skee Riegel =

American professional golfer (1914–2009)

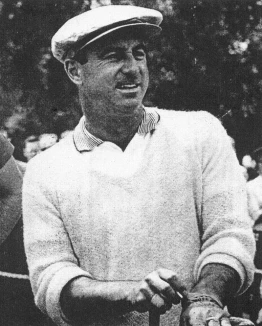
- Riegel at the 1951 Masters Tournament

Personal information
- Full name: Robert Henry Riegel
- Nickname: Skee
- Nationality: United States
- Born: November 25, 1914 New Bloomfield, Pennsylvania, U.S.
- Died: February 22, 2009 (aged 94) West Chester, Pennsylvania, U.S.

Career
- Sport: Golf
- College: West Point; Hobart College; Lafayette College
- Turned professional: 1950
- Former tour: PGA Tour
- Professional wins: 7

Best results in major championships
- Masters Tournament: 2nd: 1951
- PGA Championship: T17: 1956, 1957
- U.S. Open: T10: 1951
- The Open Championship: DNP

Robert Henry "Skee" Riegel (November 25, 1914 – February 22, 2009) was an American professional golfer.

== Early life ==
Riegel was born in 1914 in New Bloomfield, Pennsylvania and grew up in Upper Darby. He attended West Point, Hobart College, and Lafayette College where he played football and baseball, but not golf. He took up golf at the age of 23. During World War II, he was a flying instructor for the US Army Air Corp in Arkadelphia, Arkansas.

== Amateur career ==
Riegel won the 1947 U.S. Amateur over Johnny Dawson at the Pebble Beach Golf Links, 2 and 1. He played on the Walker Cup teams of 1947 and 1949 under captain as Francis Ouimet. He went undefeated in his four Walker Cup matches.

Riegel was the low amateur (T13) in the 1948 Masters Tournament.

== Professional career ==
In 1950, Riegel turned professional. He played in 11 straight Masters Tournaments from 1947 to 1957. In the 1951 Masters Tournament, he was tied with Sam Snead after three rounds and finished second to Ben Hogan by two strokes. Riegel also finished second to Ted Kroll in the 1952 Insurance City Open.

Riegel stopped playing full-time in 1953. He served as head pro at Radnor Valley Country Club from 1954 to 1961 and then became involved in the ownership of York Road Country Club in Bucks County, Pennsylvania.

Riegel was the pro emeritus at the Cape May National Golf Club in Cape May, New Jersey. He was often found walking the grounds with his poodle John Paul. Cape May National holds a large amount of history, with a number of articles about Riegel on the walls of its clubhouse, as well as a number of plaques located on the 18th tee.

== Amateur wins ==
- 1942 Florida State Amateur
- 1943 Southern Oregon Amateur
- 1946 Trans-Mississippi Amateur
- 1947 Monroe Invitational, U.S. Amateur
- 1948 Trans-Mississippi Amateur, Western Amateur

== Professional wins ==
this list may be incomplete

- 1957 Pennsylvania Open Championship
- 1959 Pennsylvania Open Championship, Yorktown Open
- 1960 Philadelphia Open Championship, Genesee (Genny) Open
- 1967 Salsbury Open
- 1968 Salsbury Open

== Major championships ==
=== Amateur wins (1) ===
Year	Championship	Winning score	Runner-up
1947	U.S. Amateur	2 & 1	(United States) Johnny Dawson

=== Results timeline ===
Amateur

Tournament	1940	1941	1942	1943	1944	1945	1946	1947	1948	1949
Masters Tournament				NT	NT	NT		T50	T13 LA	T30
U.S. Open			NT	NT	NT	NT	CUT	T59	CUT	T14 LA
U.S. Amateur	R64	R16	NT	NT	NT	NT	R32 M	1	R64	R32
The Amateur Championship	NT	NT	NT	NT	NT	NT		R16		

Professional

Tournament	1950	1951	1952	1953	1954	1955	1956	1957	1958	1959
Masters Tournament	T21	2	T14	T29	T38	T13	T40	T31		
U.S. Open	T12	T10	CUT		T42	T40	CUT		CUT	CUT
PGA Championship						R64	R32	R32	T40	CUT

Tournament	1960	1961	1962	1963	1964	1965	1966	1967	1968	1969
Masters Tournament										
U.S. Open				CUT	48			CUT		CUT
PGA Championship			CUT	T63			CUT	T51		

Note: Riegel never played in The Open Championship.

Win
Top 10
Did not play

M = medalist
LA = low amateur
NT = no tournament
CUT = missed the half-way cut (3rd round cut in 1962 PGA Championship)
"T" indicates a tie for a place
R64, R32, R16, QF, SF = round in which player lost in match play

Sources: Masters, U.S. Open and U.S. Amateur, PGA Championship, 1947 British Amateur

== U.S. national team appearances ==
Amateur

- Walker Cup: 1947 (winners), 1949 (winners)
