= Johnny Dawson =

American golfer and golf course architect (1902–1986)

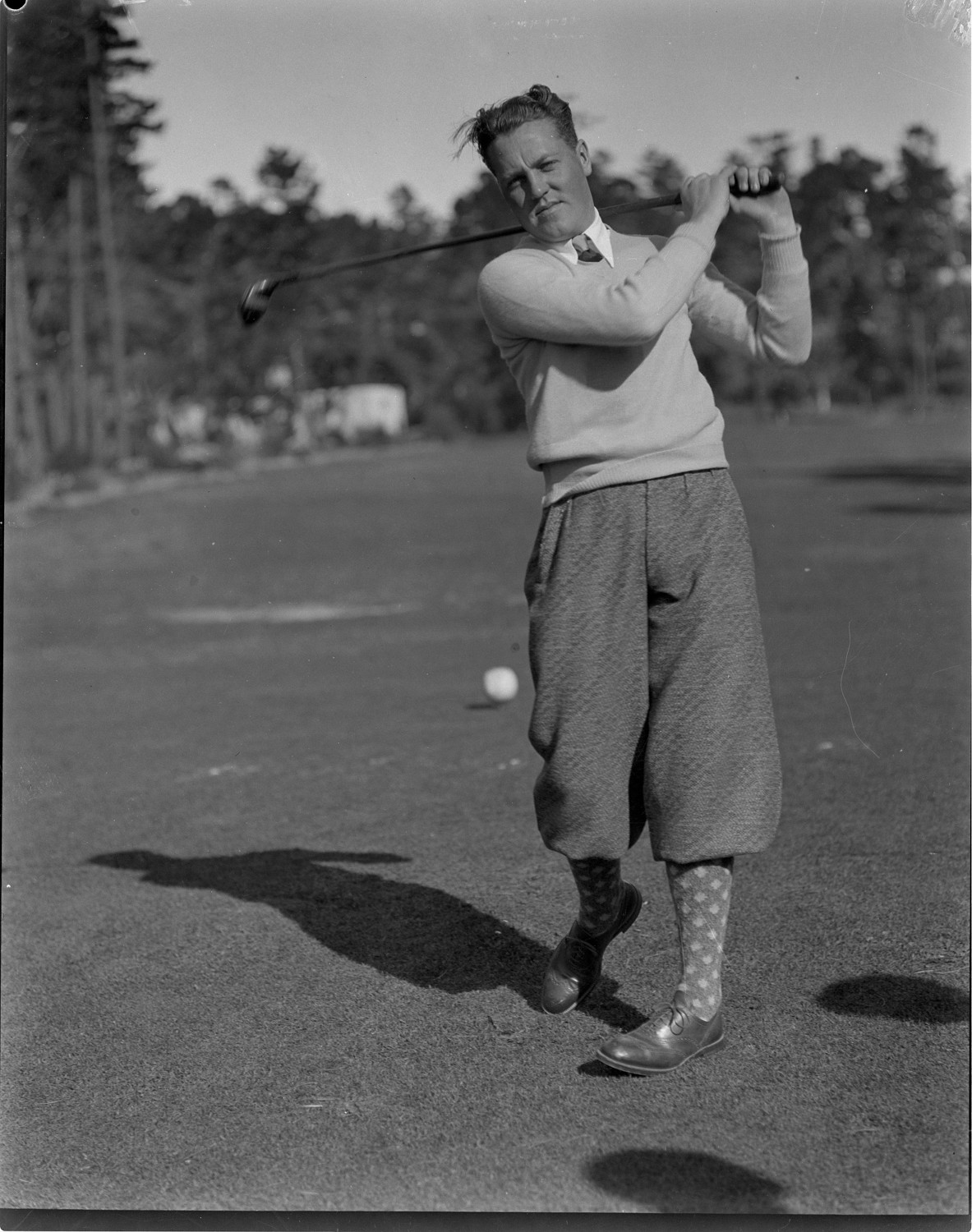
- Dawson at Pebble Beach

Personal information
- Full name: John W. Dawson
- Nationality: United States
- Born: December 20, 1902 Chicago, Illinois, U.S.
- Died: January 6, 1986 (aged 83) Palm Springs, California, U.S.
- Spouse: Velma Wayne Dawson

Career
- Sport: Golf
- Status: Amateur
- Professional wins: 3

Number of wins by tour
- PGA Tour: 1
- Other: 2

Best results in major championships
- Masters Tournament: T9: 1936
- PGA Championship: DNP
- U.S. Open: T41: 1948
- The Open Championship: DNP

John W. Dawson (December 20, 1902 – January 6, 1986) was an American amateur golfer and golf course architect.

== Career ==
Dawson was born in Chicago, Illinois. Although he was a lifelong amateur golfer, his amateur status was rescinded by the United States Golf Association (USGA) for a time due to his employment with the Spalding sporting goods company. Dawson's amateur status was eventually restored and he competed in several USGA events. He was runner-up, at the age of 44, to Skee Riegel in 1947 U.S. Amateur. Dawson played on the winning 1949 Walker Cup team. He was also runner-up in 1958 U.S. Senior Amateur.

As a golf course architect, he designed and built Marrakesh Country Club, the Seven Lakes, Thunderbird, El Dorado, and La Quinta Country Clubs.

Dawson also won the Southern California Golf Association (SCGA) amateur championship four times between 1942 and 1952.

== Personal life ==
Dawson lived in Palm Springs. He was married to the puppetteer Velma Wayne Dawson.

== Awards and honors ==
In 2007, Dawson was inducted into the SCGA Hall of Fame.

== Amateur wins ==
- 1936 Trans-Mississippi Amateur
- 1942 California State Amateur, Southern California Amateur
- 1944 Southern California Amateur
- 1945 Southern California Amateur
- 1952 Southern California Amateur

== Professional wins (3) ==
Note: all wins were as an amateur

=== PGA Tour wins (1) ===
- 1942 Bing Crosby Pro-Am

=== Other wins (2) ===
- 1935 Iowa Open
- 1942 California State Open

== U.S. national team appearances ==
Amateur

- Walker Cup: 1949 (winners)
