= Willie Turnesa =

American amateur golfer (1914–2001)

Personal information
- Full name: William P. Turnesa
- Nationality: United States
- Born: January 20, 1914 Elmsford, New York, U.S.
- Died: June 16, 2001 (aged 87) Sleepy Hollow, New York, U.S.

Career
- Sport: Golf
- College: College of the Holy Cross
- Status: Amateur
- Professional wins: 1

Best results in major championships (wins: 3)
- Masters Tournament: T26: 1939
- PGA Championship: DNP
- U.S. Open: T40: 1941
- The Open Championship: DNP
- U.S. Amateur: Won: 1938, 1948
- British Amateur: Won: 1947

William P. Turnesa (January 20, 1914 – June 16, 2001) was an American amateur golfer, best known for winning two U.S. Amateur titles and the British Amateur.

== Early life ==
He was one of seven famous golfing brothers; Phil (1896-1987), Frank (1898-1949), Joe (1901-1991), Mike (1907-2000), Doug (1909-1972), Jim (1912-1971), and Willie (1914-2001). Willie was the only brother not to turn professional. The family was referred to as a "golf dynasty" in a 2000 New York Times article.

Turnesa was born in Elmsford, New York and lived most of his life there. His older brothers forbade him to turn pro and pooled their money to send him to college.

== Golf career ==
Turnesa graduated from Holy Cross in 1938 and won his first U.S. Amateur later that year at Oakmont Country Club. Turnesa won the British Amateur in 1947 at Carnoustie Golf Links, beating fellow American Dick Chapman 3&2. He won his second U.S. Amateur in 1948 and was runner-up in the 1949 British Amateur, losing to Irishman Max McCready. He won numerous other amateur events, mostly in the New York area.

He played on three straight winning Walker Cup teams, 1947, 1949, and 1951. He was playing captain on the last team.

Turnesa served as president of both the Metropolitan Golf Association and New York State Golf Association. He co-founded the Westchester Caddie Scholarship Fund in 1956.

== Death ==
Turnesa died in Sleepy Hollow, New York.

== Tournament wins ==
this list is incomplete

- 1933 Westchester Amateur
- 1936 Westchester Amateur
- 1937 Metropolitan Amateur, Westchester Amateur
- 1938 U.S. Amateur, Westchester Amateur, New York State Amateur
- 1943 Florida Open
- 1947 British Amateur
- 1948 U.S. Amateur

== Major championships ==
=== Amateur wins (3) ===
Year	Championship	Winning score	Runner-up
1938	U.S. Amateur	8 & 7	(United States) Pat Abbott
1947	British Amateur	3 & 2	(United States) Dick Chapman
1948	U.S. Amateur	2 & 1	(United States) Ray Billows

=== Results timeline ===
Tournament	1933	1934	1935	1936	1937	1938	1939
Masters Tournament	NYF	45					T26
U.S. Open							T47
U.S. Amateur	R16	QF	R16	R64		1	R32
British Amateur							

Tournament	1940	1941	1942	1943	1944	1945	1946	1947	1948	1949
Masters Tournament	T47			NT	NT	NT				
U.S. Open		T40	NT	NT	NT	NT				
U.S. Amateur	R16		NT	NT	NT	NT	R64		1	SF
British Amateur	NT	NT	NT	NT	NT	NT		1	SF	2

Tournament	1950	1951	1952	1953	1954	1955	1956	1957
Masters Tournament								
U.S. Open								
U.S. Amateur	R32	R128			R128	R32	R64	R32
British Amateur	R64	R64						

Note: Turnesa never played in the British Open or PGA Championship.

Win
Top 10
Did not play

NT = No tournament
NYF = Not yet founded
CUT = missed the half-way cut
R128, R64, R32, R16, QF, SF = Round in which player lost in match play
"T" indicates a tie for a place

Source for The Masters: www.masters.com

Source for U.S. Open and U.S. Amateur: USGA Championship Database

Source for 1948 British Amateur: The Glasgow Herald, May 29, 1948, pg. 3.

Source for 1950 British Amateur: The Glasgow Herald, May 25, 1950, pg. 9.

Source for 1951 British Amateur: The Glasgow Herald, May 24, 1951, pg. 7.

== U.S. national team appearances ==
Amateur

- Walker Cup: 1947 (winners), 1949 (winners), 1951 (winners, playing captain)
