= Skip Alexander =

American professional golfer (1918–1997)

Personal information
- Full name: Stewart Murray Alexander, Jr.
- Nationality: United States
- Born: August 6, 1918 Philadelphia, Pennsylvania, U.S.
- Died: October 24, 1997 (aged 79) St. Petersburg, Florida, U.S.

Career
- Sport: Golf
- College: Duke University
- Turned professional: 1941
- Former tour: PGA Tour
- Professional wins: 5

Number of wins by tour
- PGA Tour: 3

Best results in major championships
- Masters Tournament: T14: 1950
- PGA Championship: T9: 1948
- U.S. Open: 11th: 1948
- The Open Championship: DNP

Stewart Murray "Skip" Alexander, Jr. (August 6, 1918 – October 24, 1997) was an American collegiate and professional golfer.

== Early life and amateur career ==
Alexander was born in Philadelphia, Pennsylvania, but was raised in Durham, North Carolina. He attended Duke University from 1937 to 1940. During that time, he helped Duke win the Southern Conference Championship in golf three times, won the individual conference title twice, was a two-time Southern Intercollegiate medalist and twice reached the quarter-finals of the National Intercollegiate Tournament.

== Professional career ==
In 1941, Alexander turned professional and joined the PGA Tour in 1946. In 1948, he won his first tour event, the Tucson Open. He would win twice more on tour.

On September 24, 1950, Alexander was the lone survivor of a plane crash in Evansville, Indiana, in which he was severely burned over 70% of his body. After 17 operations, one of which was to permanently freeze his badly burned fingers around the grip of a golf club instead of removing them, he returned to help the United States win the 1951 Ryder Cup. Sam Snead, the Ryder Cup captain that year, paired Alexander against the British champion, John Panton, in the singles portion of the competition. Although the thought was that it might well be a throwaway match, it would at least save their other players from playing Panton, who was beating everyone at that time. Alexander, with both hands bleeding, won the match by the largest margin in Ryder Cup history to that point, 8 & 7.

Alexander served as the golf pro at Lakewood Country Club (now known as St. Petersburg Country Club) in St. Petersburg, Florida starting in 1951, and served in that capacity for 34 years.

== Awards and honors ==
- In 1959, Alexander was awarded the Ben Hogan Award for golfers who make a comeback after suffering a physical handicap
- In 1986, he was inducted into the Carolinas Golf Hall of Fame
- In 1987, was inducted for into the North Carolina Sports Hall of Fame as well as the Duke Hall of Fame.

== Personal life ==
Alexander's son Buddy, a former U.S. Amateur champion, was the head golf coach at the University of Florida from 1988 to 2014. He also coached at Georgia Southern University (1977–80) and Louisiana State University (1983–87).

In 1997, Alexander died at his home in St. Petersburg.

== Amateur wins ==
this list may be incomplete

- 1941 North and South Amateur

== Professional wins ==
=== PGA Tour wins (3) ===
No.	Date	Tournament	Winning score	Margin of victory	Runner-up
1	Feb 1, 1948	Tucson Open	−16 (67-63-72-62=264)	1 stroke	(United States) Johnny Palmer
2	May 2, 1948	National Capital Open	−17 (69-66-68-68=271)	6 strokes	(South Africa) Bobby Locke
3	Sep 5, 1950	Empire State Open	−5 (72-71-66-70=279)	Playoff	(United States) Ky Laffoon

=== Other wins ===
this list may be incomplete

- 1946 Carolinas Open, Gainesville Open

== Team appearances ==
- Ryder Cup: 1949 (winners), 1951 (winners)
