= Claude Harmon =

American professional golfer (1916–1989)

Personal information
- Full name: Eugene Claude Harmon Sr.
- Nationality: United States
- Born: July 14, 1916 Savannah, Georgia, U.S.
- Died: July 23, 1989 (aged 73) Houston, Texas, U.S.
- Spouses: Alice Cullen McKee Harmon; Anne Keane Harmon
- Children: 6, including Butch

Career
- Sport: Golf
- Status: Professional
- Former tour: PGA Tour
- Professional wins: 15

Number of wins by tour
- PGA Tour: 1
- Other: 14

Best results in major championships (wins: 1)
- Masters Tournament: Won: 1948
- PGA Championship: T3: 1945, 1948, 1953
- U.S. Open: T3: 1959
- The Open Championship: 27th: 1948

Eugene Claude Harmon Sr. (July 14, 1916 – July 23, 1989) was an American professional golfer and golf instructor.

== Early life and amateur career ==
Harmon was born in Savannah, Georgia. He spent much of his boyhood in Florida, in the Orlando area. A youthful prodigy, he qualified for the U.S. Amateur at age 15 in 1931.

== Professional career ==
Harmon was a club professional when he won the 1948 Masters Tournament by five shots to earn $2,500. He was a semi-finalist three times in the PGA Championship competing as a club pro against full-time tour players. Claude Harmon also finished in third place at the 1959 U.S. Open, which was held at his home course at Winged Foot.

From 1945 to 1978, Harmon was the head professional at Winged Foot Golf Club in Mamaroneck, New York, and also served as the winter professional for many years at the Seminole Golf Club in Juno Beach, Florida. In 1959, Harmon played in the U.S. Open at Winged Foot and placed third. In 1959, he was hired as the head professional at Thunderbird Country Club in Rancho Mirage, California, where he served for over a decade. Lastly, he took a club job in Texas in the Houston area.

== Personal life ==
Harmon had four sons and two daughters. All of his sons became golf professionals and instructors. His son, Butch Harmon, has served as the golf coach for Greg Norman and Tiger Woods, among others. In addition, his sons Craig and Bill have been noted in Golf Digest's "top 50 teachers" list. His third eldest son, Dick (1947–2006), was also a golf instructor, as is grandson Claude Harmon III.

Harmon was one of the few close friends of legendary star Ben Hogan, and the two played together frequently and worked together on their games.

Harmon died of heart failure following surgery in Houston, aged 73.

== Awards and honors ==
- Harmon is a member of the World Golf Teachers' Hall of Fame
- Harmon is a member of the PGA of America Hall of Fame.

== Professional wins (15) ==
=== PGA Tour wins (1) ===
- 1948 **Masters Tournament**

Major championship is shown in bold.

=== Other wins (14) ===
this list may be incomplete

- 1946 Westchester Open, Metropolitan PGA Championship
- 1947 Westchester Open
- 1948 Westchester PGA Championship
- 1949 Westchester PGA Championship, Havana Invitational
- 1950 Miami International Four-Ball (with Pete Cooper), Westchester Open
- 1951 Westchester Open, Metropolitan PGA Championship, Metropolitan Open
- 1953 Westchester Open
- 1958 Westchester PGA Championship
- 1960 Westchester Open

== Major championships ==
=== Wins (1) ===
Year	Championship	54 holes	Winning score	Margin	Runner-up
1948	Masters Tournament	2 shot lead	−9 (70-70-69-70=279)	5 strokes	(United States) Cary Middlecoff

=== Results timeline ===
Tournament	1940	1941	1942	1943	1944	1945	1946	1947	1948	1949
Masters Tournament				NT	NT	NT	18	T26	**1**	T11
U.S. Open	DQ		NT	NT	NT	NT	T15	T19	CUT	T8
The Open Championship	NT	NT	NT	NT	NT	NT			27	
PGA Championship				NT		SF	R64	R16	SF	R32

Tournament	1950	1951	1952	1953	1954	1955	1956	1957	1958	1959
Masters Tournament	T32	T35	T14	T34	T53	T28	T46	T38	T9	CUT
U.S. Open	T38	T54		CUT	T15	CUT			CUT	T3
The Open Championship										
PGA Championship	R16	R64		SF	R32	R16	R32	6	T56	T38

Tournament	1960	1961	1962	1963	1964	1965	1966	1967	1968	1969
Masters Tournament	T16	CUT	CUT	WD	CUT	CUT	WD	WD	WD	WD
U.S. Open	T27		CUT		CUT					
The Open Championship										
PGA Championship		CUT	T44							

Tournament	1970	1971
Masters Tournament		WD
U.S. Open		
The Open Championship		
PGA Championship		

Win
Top 10
Did not play

NT = no tournament
WD = withdrew
DQ = disqualified
CUT = missed the half-way cut
R64, R32, R16, QF, SF = Round in which player lost in PGA Championship match play
"T" indicates a tie for a place

=== Summary ===
Tournament	Wins	2nd	3rd	Top-5	Top-10	Top-25	Events	Cuts made
Masters Tournament	1	0	0	1	2	6	25	14
U.S. Open	0	0	1	1	2	5	15	9
The Open Championship	0	0	0	0	0	0	1	1
PGA Championship	0	0	3	3	7	10	16	15
Totals	1	0	4	5	11	21	57	39

- Most consecutive cuts made – 12 (1948 Open Championship – 1953 Masters)
- Longest streak of top-10s – 2 (twice)
