= Charles Coe =

American amateur golfer (1923–2001)

Personal information
- Full name: Charles Robert Coe
- Nickname: Bucket
- Nationality: United States
- Born: October 26, 1923 Ardmore, Oklahoma, U.S.
- Died: May 16, 2001 (aged 77) Oklahoma City, Oklahoma, U.S.
- Height: 6 ft 1 in (1.85 m)
- Weight: 135 lb (61 kg; 9.6 st)
- Spouse: Elizabeth Coe (m. 1948–2001)
- Children: Charles, Jr., Ross, Ward

Career
- Sport: Golf
- College: University of Oklahoma
- Status: Amateur

Best results in major championships
- Masters Tournament: T2: 1961
- PGA Championship: DNP
- U.S. Open: T13: 1958
- The Open Championship: DNP

Achievements and awards
- Bob Jones Award: 1964

Charles Robert Coe (October 26, 1923 – May 16, 2001) was an American amateur golfer who is considered by many to be one of the greatest American amateurs in history.

== Early life ==
Born in Ardmore, Oklahoma, Coe served as a pilot during World War II, and later attended the University of Oklahoma from 1946 to 1948. He won the Big Seven Conference championship all three years. He was a member of the Gamma Phi chapter of Beta Theta Pi.

== Golf career ==
Coe did not turn professional. He later stated, "When I was growing up, golf was a gentleman's game." In addition, his wife did not think Coe's potential career as a touring professional was amenable for family life. "If I thought I was going to raise three children out of a suitcase, I was crazy," she later said. For his career, Coe worked in the oil business.

Coe won the U.S. Amateur in 1949, beating Rufus King 11 & 10 in the finals, and won it again in 1958 with a 5 & 4 victory over Tommy Aaron. He finished runner-up to Jack Nicklaus in the 1959 tournament. Coe won the Western Amateur in 1950, and made the finals of the British Amateur in 1951, losing to Dick Chapman. He won four Trans-Mississippi Amateurs, in 1947, 1949, 1952, and 1956. He played on six Walker Cup teams from 1949 to 1963, including as playing captain on the 1959 team, and was non-playing captain on a seventh team in 1957.

Coe made 19 Masters Tournament appearances and owns almost every Masters amateur record, including most cuts made (15); top-25 finishes (9); top-10 finishes (3); eagles (6), rounds played (67) and most times low amateur (6). Coe won low amateur honors at Augusta in four consecutive decades: 1940s, 1950s, 1960s and 1970s. He also holds the amateur records for best finish (2nd in 1961), lowest third round score (67 in 1959), and lowest 72-hole score (281 in 1961). In 1961, Coe rallied in the final round from six shots down to finish one stroke behind Gary Player.

== Personal life ==
Coe was married to Elizabeth. They had three children.

== Death and legacy ==
Coe died in his sleep on May 16, 2001, in Oklahoma City, Oklahoma. When he died, the Rocky Mountain News quoted a Castle Pines golf club member saying, "Charlie Coe was an amateur at everything except life."

The Charlie Coe Golf Center at the University of Oklahoma was named after him. In addition, five years after his death Jack Nicklaus named him an honoree at his Memorial Tournament.

== Award and honors ==
- In 1964, Coe received the Bob Jones Award, given by the United States Golf Association in recognition of distinguished sportsmanship in golf.
- In 1987, Coe was inducted into the Oklahoma Sports Hall of Fame.
- In 2006, Coe was posthumously named an honoree at the Memorial Tournament.
- The Charlie Coe Golf Center at the University of Oklahoma is named in his honor.

== Amateur wins (7) ==
this list is probably incomplete

- 1947 Trans-Mississippi Amateur
- 1949 U.S. Amateur, Trans-Mississippi Amateur
- 1950 Western Amateur
- 1952 Trans-Mississippi Amateur
- 1956 Trans-Mississippi Amateur
- 1958 U.S. Amateur
- 1963 Mt. Vernon Classic

== Major championships ==
=== Amateur wins (2) ===
Year	Championship	Winning score	Runner-up
1949	U.S. Amateur	11 & 10	(United States) Rufus King
1958	U.S. Amateur	5 & 4	(United States) Tommy Aaron

=== Results timeline ===
Tournament	1947	1948	1949
Masters Tournament			T16 LA
U.S. Open			
U.S. Amateur	R128	SF	1
British Amateur			

Tournament	1950	1951	1952	1953	1954	1955	1956	1957	1958	1959
Masters Tournament	T32	T12 LA	T46	T16	T20	T32		DQ	T23	6 LA
U.S. Open									T13 LA	T38
U.S. Amateur	R32	QF	R16	R64	R256	R256	R16	R32	1	2
British Amateur		2								R64

Tournament	1960	1961	1962	1963	1964	1965	1966	1967	1968	1969
Masters Tournament	T39	T2 LA	T9 LA	T37	CUT	CUT	T50			
U.S. Open										
U.S. Amateur	R64	R64	R256	SF		–	–	–	–	–
British Amateur										

Tournament	1970	1971
Masters Tournament	T23 LA	CUT
U.S. Open		

Note: Coe never played in The Open Championship nor the PGA Championship.

Win
Top 10
Did not play

LA = Low amateur
DQ = disqualified
CUT = missed the half-way cut
R256, R128, R64, R32, R16, QF, SF = Round in which player lost in match play
"T" indicates a tie for a place

Source for The Masters: www.masters.com

Source for U.S. Open and U.S. Amateur: USGA Championship Database

Source for 1959 British Amateur: The Glasgow Herald, May 28, 1959, pg. 9.

== U.S. national team appearances ==
Amateur

- Walker Cup: 1949 (winners), 1951 (winners), 1953 (winners), 1957 (winners, non-playing captain) 1959 (winners, playing captain), 1961 (winners), 1963 (winners)
- Eisenhower Trophy: 1958
- Americas Cup: 1952 (winners), 1954 (winners), 1958 (winners), 1960 (winners), 1961 (winners), 1963 (winners)
