= 1958 Masters Tournament =

- Front cover of the 1958 Masters Guide

Tournament information
- Dates: April 3–6, 1958
- Location: Augusta, Georgia; 33.503°N 82.020°W
- Course: Augusta National Golf Club
- Organized by: Augusta National Golf Club
- Tour: PGA Tour

Statistics
- Par: 72
- Length: 6,980 yards (6,383 m)
- Field: 86 players, 43 after cut
- Cut: 149 (+5)
- Prize fund: $60,050
- Winner's share: $11,250

Champion
- (United States) Arnold Palmer
- 284 (−4)
- Location in the United States Location in Georgia

The 1958 Masters Tournament was the 22nd Masters Tournament, held April 3–6 at Augusta National Golf Club in Augusta, Georgia. Arnold Palmer won the first of his four Masters titles, one stroke ahead of runners-up Doug Ford and Fred Hawkins. It was the first of his seven major titles.

== Recap ==
Arnold Palmer, age 28, was the third round co-leader and eagled the 13th hole on Sunday to propel him to victory, as he three-putted on the final green. Three-time champion Sam Snead, age 45, was the other co-leader after 54 holes, but shot a 79 (+7) on Sunday to fall to 13th place. One stroke back entering the final round was 1955 champion Cary Middlecoff, who carded a 75 in the final round and tied for 6th.

Palmer's first Masters victory was not without some controversy. On the 12th hole of the final round, Palmer thought his tee ball was embedded behind the green but the on-site rules official would not give him relief. Playing that ball as it lay, Palmer made a double-bogey. Upset over the questionable ruling and the double-bogey, Palmer then played a second ball from behind the green and, after taking relief, made a par. Several holes later word came from the tournament officials that Palmer was entitled to relief and his par score on 12 would stand.

Palmer's caddy was Nathaniel "Iron Man" Avery.

Prior to the tournament, two stone arch bridges crossing Rae's Creek were dedicated, honoring two-time champions Ben Hogan and Byron Nelson. Hogan's is at the par-3 12th hole, and commemorated his record 72-hole score in 1953, his second win at Augusta and first of three consecutive majors that year. The other bridge departs the 13th tee; Nelson went birdie-eagle at these two holes in the final round in 1937, gained six strokes on the leader, and won the first of his five majors.

Sports Illustrated writer Herbert Warren Wind first used the term "Amen Corner" in a story to describe where the critical final day's action had occurred.

This was the first major to have a five-figure winner's share; six figures arrived at the 1983 PGA Championship and seven at the 2001 Masters.

During the first day of the tournament, a man named Allen W. Perkins gained entry to Augusta National by asking golfer Cary Middlecoff to share a ride from the hotel where they both were staying. As club staff assumed he was a player, Perkins proceeded to help himself to a spot in the locker room, practice on the putting green, and begin golfing on hole 1, Tea Olive. Perkins was forced by security to buy a ticket and remove his belongings from the clubhouse.

== Field ==
1. Masters champions

Jack Burke Jr. (4,8,11), Jimmy Demaret (8,9), Doug Ford (4,8,11), Claude Harmon (10), Ben Hogan (2,3,4), Herman Keiser, Cary Middlecoff (2,9), Byron Nelson (2,4,8), Henry Picard (4), Gene Sarazen (2,3,4), Horton Smith, Sam Snead (3,4,8,9), Craig Wood (2)

- Ralph Guldahl (2) did not play.

The following categories only apply to Americans

2. U.S. Open champions

Julius Boros (9), Billy Burke, Jack Fleck, Ed Furgol (8,11), Tony Manero, Lloyd Mangrum, Dick Mayer (9,10,11), Fred McLeod, Sam Parks Jr., Lew Worsham

3. The Open champions

Jock Hutchison (4), Denny Shute (4)

4. PGA champions

Walter Burkemo (9,10), Vic Ghezzi, Chick Harbert (9), Chandler Harper, Lionel Hebert (10,11), Johnny Revolta, Paul Runyan, Jim Turnesa

5. U.S. Amateur and Amateur champions

Dick Chapman (7,a), Charles Coe (a), Hillman Robbins (7,a), Harvie Ward (8,a)

6. Members of the 1957 U.S. Walker Cup team

Rex Baxter (7,a), Arnold Blum (a), Joe Campbell (a), William C. Campbell (a), Bill Hyndman (9,a), Chuck Kocsis (a), Dale Morey (a), Billy Joe Patton (9,a), Mason Rudolph (7,a), Bud Taylor (7,8,a)

- Morey was a reserve for the team.

7. 1957 U.S. Amateur quarter-finalists

Gene Andrews (a), Phil Rodgers (a)

- Dick Yost did not play.

8. Top 24 players and ties from the 1957 Masters Tournament

Billy Casper, Mike Fetchick (9), Dow Finsterwald (9,10,11), Marty Furgol, Fred Hawkins (9,11), Jay Hebert (10), Al Mengert, Arnold Palmer, Henry Ransom, Ken Venturi (9)

- Johnny Palmer's wife was having a baby and he did not play.

9. Top 16 players and ties from the 1957 U.S. Open

Billy Maxwell, Frank Stranahan

10. 1957 PGA Championship quarter-finalists

Charles Sheppard, Don Whitt

11. Members of the U.S. 1957 Ryder Cup team

Tommy Bolt, Ted Kroll, Art Wall Jr.

12. One player, either amateur or professional, not already qualified, selected by a ballot of ex-Masters champions

Mike Souchak

13. One professional, not already qualified, selected by a ballot of ex-U.S. Open champions

Gene Littler

14. One amateur, not already qualified, selected by a ballot of ex-U.S. Amateur champions

Don Cherry (a)

15. Two players, not already qualified, from a points list based on finishes in the winter part of the 1958 PGA Tour

Dave Ragan, Bo Wininger

16. Winner of the 1957 Canadian Open

George Bayer

17. Foreign invitations

Al Balding (8), Bob Charles (a), Bruce Crampton (8), Henri de Lamaze (a), Roberto De Vicenzo (9), Stan Leonard (8), Torakichi Nakamura, Koichi Ono, Frank Phillips, Gary Player (8), Peter Thomson (3,8), Flory Van Donck, Norman Von Nida, Nick Weslock (a)

- Numbers in brackets indicate categories that the player would have qualified under had they been American.

== Round summaries ==
=== First round ===
Thursday, April 3, 1958

Place	Player	Score	To par
1	(United States) Ken Venturi	68	−4
T2	(United States) Jimmy Demaret	69	−3
T2	(United States) Chick Harbert	69	−3
T2	(Australia) Norman Von Nida	69	−3
T2	(United States) Bo Wininger	69	−3
T6	(United States) Cary Middlecoff	70	−2
T6	(United States) Arnold Palmer	70	−2
T6	(Belgium) Flory Van Donck	70	−2
T9	(Argentina) Roberto De Vicenzo	71	−1
T9	(United States) Jack Fleck	71	−1
T9	(United States) Claude Harmon	71	−1
T9	(United States) Fred Hawkins	71	−1
T9	(United States) Lionel Hebert	71	−1
T9	(United States) Bill Hyndman (a)	71	−1
T9	(United States) Billy Maxwell	71	−1
T9	(United States) Byron Nelson	71	−1
T9	(United States) Art Wall Jr.	71	−1

=== Second round ===
Friday, April 4, 1958

Place	Player	Score	To par
1	(United States) Ken Venturi	68-72=140	−4
T2	(United States) Billy Maxwell	71-70=141	−3
T2	(United States) Billy Joe Patton (a)	72-69=141	−3
T4	(Canada) Stan Leonard	72-70=142	−2
T4	(United States) Bo Wininger	69-73=142	−2
T6	(United States) Dow Finsterwald	72-71=143	−1
T6	(United States) Chick Harbert	69-74=143	−1
T6	(United States) Cary Middlecoff	70-73=143	−1
T6	(United States) Arnold Palmer	70-73=143	−1
T6	(United States) Sam Snead	72-71=143	−1
T6	(United States) Art Wall Jr.	71-72=143	−1

=== Third round ===
Saturday, April 5, 1958

Place	Player	Score	To par
T1	(United States) Arnold Palmer	70-73-68=211	−5
T1	(United States) Sam Snead	72-71-68=211	−5
3	(United States) Cary Middlecoff	70-73-69=212	−4
T4	(United States) Billy Maxwell	71-70-72=213	−3
T4	(United States) Al Mengert	73-71-69=213	−3
T4	(United States) Art Wall Jr.	71-72-70=213	−3
T4	(United States) Bo Wininger	69-73-71=213	−3
T8	(United States) Fred Hawkins	71-75-68=214	−2
T8	(United States) Billy Joe Patton (a)	72-69-73=214	−2
T8	(United States) Ken Venturi	68-72-74=214	−2

=== Final round ===
Sunday, April 6, 1958

==== Final leaderboard ====
Champion
Silver Cup winner (low amateur)
(a) = amateur
(c) = past champion

Top 10
Place	Player	Score	To par	Money (US$)
1	(United States) Arnold Palmer	70-73-68-73=284	−4	11,250
T2	(United States) Doug Ford (c)	74-71-70-70=285	−3	4,500
T2	(United States) Fred Hawkins	71-75-68-71=285	−3	4,500
T4	(Canada) Stan Leonard	72-70-73-71=286	−2	1,969
T4	(United States) Ken Venturi	68-72-74-72=286	−2	1,969
T6	(United States) Cary Middlecoff (c)	70-73-69-75=287	−1	1,519
T6	(United States) Art Wall Jr.	71-72-70-74=287	−1	1,519
8	(United States) Billy Joe Patton (a)	72-69-73-74=288	E	0
T9	(United States) Claude Harmon (c)	71-76-72-70=289	+1	1,266
T9	(United States) Jay Hebert	72-73-73-71=289	+1	1,266
T9	(United States) Billy Maxwell	71-70-72-76=289	+1	1,266
T9	(United States) Al Mengert	73-71-69-76=289	+1	1,266

Leaderboard below the top 10
Place	Player	Score	To par	Money ($)
13	(United States) Sam Snead (c)	72-71-68-79=290	+2	1,125
T14	(United States) Jimmy Demaret (c)	69-79-70-73=291	+3	1,050
T14	(United States) Ben Hogan (c)	72-77-69-73=291	+3	1,050
T14	(United States) Mike Souchak	72-75-73-71=291	+3	1,050
T17	(United States) Dow Finsterwald	72-71-74-75=292	+4	975
T17	(United States) Chick Harbert	69-74-73-76=292	+4	975
T17	(United States) Bo Wininger	69-73-71-79=292	+4	975
T20	(United States) Billy Casper	76-71-72-74=293	+5	956
T20	(United States) Byron Nelson (c)	71-77-74-71=293	+5	956
22	(United States) Phil Rodgers (a)	77-72-73-72=294	+6	0
T23	(United States) Charles Coe (a)	73-76-69-77=295	+7	0
T23	(United States) Ted Kroll	73-75-75-72=295	+7	900
T23	(Australia) Peter Thomson	72-74-73-76=295	+7	900
T26	(Canada) Al Balding	75-72-71-78=296	+8	900
T26	(Australia) Bruce Crampton	73-76-72-75=296	+8	900
T26	(United States) Bill Hyndman (a)	71-76-70-79=296	+8	0
T29	(United States) George Bayer	74-75-72-76=297	+9	350
T29	(United States) Arnold Blum (a)	72-74-75-76=297	+9	0
T29	(United States) Joe Campbell (a)	73-75-74-75=297	+9	0
T32	(United States) Tommy Bolt	74-75-74-75=298	+10	350
T32	(United States) Lionel Hebert	71-77-75-75=298	+10	350
T32	(Belgium) Flory Van Donck	70-74-75-79=298	+10	350
T35	(United States) Marty Furgol	74-73-75-77=299	+11	350
T35	(United States) Dave Ragan	73-73-77-76=299	+11	350
T35	(United States) Paul Runyan	73-76-73-77=299	+11	350
T35	(United States) Jim Turnesa	72-76-76-75=299	+11	350
T39	(United States) Julius Boros	73-72-78-77=300	+12	350
T39	(United States) Jack Fleck	71-76-78-75=300	+12	350
41	(Japan) Torakichi Nakamura	76-73-76-76=301	+13	350
42	(United States) Gene Littler	75-73-74-80=302	+14	350
43	(Australia) Norman Von Nida	69-80-79-80=308	+20	350
CUT	(United States) Rex Baxter (a)	72-78=150	+6	
CUT	(United States) Henry Picard (c)	72-78=150	+6	
CUT	(South Africa) Gary Player	74-76=150	+6	
CUT	(United States) Jack Burke Jr. (c)	74-77=151	+7	
CUT	(Argentina) Roberto De Vicenzo	71-80=151	+7	
CUT	(United States) Chuck Kocsis (a)	76-75=151	+7	
CUT	(United States) Lloyd Mangrum	76-75=151	+7	
CUT	(United States) Dale Morey (a)	74-77=151	+7	
CUT	(United States) Henry Ransom	73-78=151	+7	
CUT	(United States) Frank Stranahan	72-79=151	+7	
CUT	(United States) William C. Campbell (a)	77-75=152	+8	
CUT	(United States) Mason Rudolph (a)	79-73=152	+8	
CUT	(United States) Harvie Ward (a)	76-76=152	+8	
CUT	(United States) Don Whitt	72-80=152	+8	
CUT	(United States) Ed Furgol	75-78=153	+9	
CUT	(United States) Dick Mayer	74-79=153	+9	
CUT	(Canada) Nick Weslock (a)	76-77=153	+9	
CUT	(United States) Walter Burkemo	74-80=154	+10	
CUT	(United States) Mike Fetchick	75-79=154	+10	
CUT	(United States) Chandler Harper	79-75=154	+10	
CUT	(United States) Johnny Revolta	74-80=154	+10	
CUT	(United States) Gene Andrews (a)	73-82=155	+11	
CUT	(United States) Vic Ghezzi	78-77=155	+11	
CUT	(Japan) Koichi Ono	74-81=155	+11	
CUT	(United States) Dick Chapman (a)	82-75=157	+13	
CUT	(New Zealand) Bob Charles (a)	77-80=157	+13	
CUT	(United States) Herman Keiser (c)	76-81=157	+13	
CUT	(United States) Denny Shute	75-82=157	+13	
CUT	(United States) Lew Worsham	75-82=157	+13	
CUT	(United States) Sam Parks Jr.	78-80=158	+14	
CUT	(Australia) Frank Phillips	75-83=158	+14	
CUT	(United States) Gene Sarazen (c)	81-78=159	+15	
CUT	(United States) Craig Wood (c)	82-77=159	+15	
CUT	(United States) Charles Sheppard	83-79=162	+18	
CUT	(United States) Bud Taylor (a)	79-83=162	+18	
CUT	(United States) Billy Burke	80-83=163	+19	
CUT	(United States) Don Cherry (a)	76-87=163	+19	
CUT	(United States) Tony Manero	82-82=164	+20	
CUT	(United States) Hillman Robbins (a)	80-84=164	+20	
CUT	(France) Henri de Lamaze (a)	84-81=165	+21	
CUT	(United States) Horton Smith (c)	80-86=166	+22	
WD	(United States) Jock Hutchison			
WD	(United States) Fred McLeod			

==== Scorecard ====
Hole	1	2	3	4	5	6	7	8	9	10	11	12	13	14	15	16	17	18
Par	4	5	4	3	4	3	4	5	4	4	4	3	5	4	5	3	4	4
(United States) Palmer	−5	−5	−5	−5	−4	−4	−4	−5	−5	−4	−4	−4	−6	−6	−6	−5	−5	−4
(United States) Ford	−1	−2	−2	−2	−2	−2	−2	−3	−3	−3	−3	−3	−3	−3	−3	−3	−3	−3
(United States) Hawkins	−2	−2	−2	−2	−2	−2	−2	−2	−3	−2	−1	−1	−1	−1	−2	−2	−3	−3
(Canada) Leonard	−1	−1	−1	−1	−2	−2	−3	−3	−4	−3	−3	−3	−3	−2	−2	−2	−2	−2
(United States) Venturi	−3	−3	−3	−4	−4	−3	−3	−3	−3	−3	−3	−3	−4	−3	−2	−1	−1	−2
(United States) Middlecoff	−4	−5	−3	−3	−3	−3	−2	−2	−2	−1	−1	−1	−1	−2	−1	−1	−1	−1
(United States) Wall	−2	−3	−3	−3	−4	−4	−3	−3	−3	−3	−3	−2	−1	−1	−1	−1	−1	−1
(United States) Snead	−3	−3	−3	−4	−3	−2	−2	−3	−3	−2	E	E	E	+1	+1	+2	+2	+2

Cumulative tournament scores, relative to par

Eagle	Birdie	Bogey	Double bogey
