= 1957 Masters Tournament =

- Front cover of the 1957 Masters Guide

Tournament information
- Dates: April 4–7, 1957
- Location: Augusta, Georgia; 33.503°N 82.020°W
- Course: Augusta National Golf Club
- Organized by: Augusta National Golf Club
- Tour: PGA Tour

Statistics
- Par: 72
- Length: 6,980 yards (6,383 m)
- Field: 101 players, 40 after cut
- Cut: 150 (+6)
- Winner's share: $8,750

Champion
- (United States) Doug Ford
- 283 (−5)

Location map
- Location in the United States Location in Georgia

The 1957 Masters Tournament was the 21st Masters Tournament, held April 4–7 at Augusta National Golf Club in Augusta, Georgia. This was the first Masters played with a 36-hole cut; 101 players started and forty made the cut at 150 (+6).

Doug Ford won his only Masters, three strokes ahead of runner-up Sam Snead, a three-time champion. Snead was the third round leader, but could only shoot even-par in a round that included six birdies and six bogeys. Ford was three strokes back after 54 holes, but was bogey-free on Sunday. On the final hole, Ford holed out from the bunker for birdie for his 66 (–6). This was Ford's second and final major title; he also won the 1955 PGA Championship.

This year was the Masters debut of Gary Player, age 21, and he tied for 24th. He won three Masters, in 1961, 1974, and 1978. Five-time British Open winner Peter Thomson was fifth, his best career finish in the Masters. Amateur Harvie Ward was fourth at even-par 288, five strokes behind Ford.

Two-time champion Ben Hogan had finished in the top ten in the last fourteen Masters that he had entered, but had 32 putts on Friday and missed the event's first-ever cut by a stroke. It was the only cut he missed at Augusta; in nine more Masters he had three top ten finishes, including his final appearance at age 54 in 1967.

== Field ==
This was the last year when professionals were invited based solely on qualification in amateur events.

1. Masters champions

Jack Burke Jr. (4,8,10,11), Jimmy Demaret, Claude Harmon (10), Ben Hogan (2,3,4,8,9), Herman Keiser, Cary Middlecoff (2,8,9,11), Byron Nelson (2,4), Henry Picard (4), Gene Sarazen (2,3,4), Horton Smith, Sam Snead (3,4,8,9,10,11), Craig Wood

- Ralph Guldahl (2) did not play.

The following categories only apply to Americans

2. U.S. Open champions

Julius Boros (8,9), Billy Burke, Jack Fleck, Ed Furgol (8,9,10), Lawson Little (5), Tony Manero, Lloyd Mangrum (8), Fred McLeod, Sam Parks Jr., Lew Worsham

3. The Open champions

Jock Hutchison (4), Denny Shute (4)

4. PGA champions

Walter Burkemo (8), Doug Ford (8,9,11), Vic Ghezzi, Bob Hamilton, Chick Harbert (11), Chandler Harper (11), Johnny Revolta, Paul Runyan, Jim Turnesa (8)

5. U.S. Amateur and Amateur champions

Dick Chapman (a), Charles Coe (a), Joe Conrad (6), Gene Littler (8), Billy Maxwell (9), Arnold Palmer (8,9), Skee Riegel, Frank Stranahan (8), Sam Urzetta (8), Bud Ward, Harvie Ward (6,7,a)

6. Members of the 1955 U.S. Walker Cup team

William C. Campbell (a), Don Cherry (a), Bruce Cudd (a), Jimmy Jackson (a), Ed Meister (a), Dale Morey (a), Billy Joe Patton (8,9,a), Hillman Robbins (8,a), Dick Yost (a)

- Robbins and Meister were reserves for the team.

7. 1956 U.S. Amateur quarter-finalists

Rex Baxter (a), Arnold Blum (a), Joe Campbell (a), Sarg Fontanini (a), Ted Gleichmann (a), Chuck Kocsis (a)

8. Top 24 players and ties from the 1956 Masters Tournament

Jerry Barber (9,11), Tommy Bolt (9,11), Pete Cooper (9), Dow Finsterwald, Shelley Mayfield, Al Mengert, Johnny Palmer, Bob Rosburg, Mike Souchak, Ken Venturi (9)

9. Top 24 players and ties from the 1956 U.S. Open

Errie Ball, Johnny Bulla, Billy Casper, Wes Ellis, Fred Haas, Dutch Harrison, Jay Hebert, Bob Kay, Ted Kroll (10,11), Bill Ogden, Bob Toski

10. 1956 PGA Championship quarter-finalists

Fred Hawkins, Bill Johnston, Terl Johnson, Henry Ransom

11. Members of the U.S. 1955 Ryder Cup team

Marty Furgol

12. One player, either amateur or professional, not already qualified, selected by a ballot of ex-Masters champions

Mike Fetchick

13. One professional, not already qualified, selected by a ballot of ex-U.S. Open champions

Dick Mayer

14. One amateur, not already qualified, selected by a ballot of ex-U.S. Amateur champions

Bud Taylor (a)

15. Two players, not already qualified, from a points list based on finishes in the winter part of the 1957 PGA Tour

Gardner Dickinson, Art Wall Jr.

16. Winner of the 1956 Canadian Open

Doug Sanders

17. Foreign invitations

Al Balding, Henry Cotton (9), Bruce Crampton, Stan Leonard (8), Jerry Magee (7,a), Moe Norman, Gary Player, Peter Thomson (8), Harry Weetman, Trevor Wilkes

- Numbers in brackets indicate categories that the player would have qualified under had they been American.

== Round summaries ==
=== First round ===
Thursday, April 4, 1957

Place	Player	Score	To par
1	(United States) Jack Burke Jr.	71	−1
T2	(Australia) Bruce Crampton	72	E
T2	(United States) Jimmy Demaret	72	E
T2	(United States) Doug Ford	72	E
T2	(Australia) Peter Thomson	72	E
T2	(United States) Sam Snead	72	E
T7	(Canada) Al Balding	73	+1
T7	(United States) Jerry Barber	73	+1
T7	(England) Henry Cotton	73	+1
T7	(United States) Ed Furgol	73	+1
T7	(United States) Marty Furgol	73	+1
T7	(United States) Arnold Palmer	73	+1
T7	(United States) Skee Riegel	73	+1
T7	(United States) Bud Ward	73	+1
T7	(United States) Harvie Ward (a)	73	+1

=== Second round ===
Friday, April 5, 1957

Place	Player	Score	To par
1	(United States) Sam Snead	72-68=140	−4
2	(United States) Jimmy Demaret	72-70=142	−2
3	(United States) Jack Burke Jr.	71-72=143	−1
T4	(United States) Ed Furgol	73-71=144	E
T4	(United States) Harvie Ward (a)	73-71=144	E
T6	(United States) Doug Ford	72-73=145	+1
T6	(Australia) Peter Thomson	72-73=145	+1
T8	(Canada) Al Balding	73-73=146	+2
T8	(England) Henry Cotton	73-73=146	+2
T8	(United States) Jay Hebert	74-72=146	+2
T8	(United States) Byron Nelson	74-72=146	+2
T8	(United States) Arnold Palmer	73-73=146	+2

=== Third round ===
Saturday, April 6, 1957

Place	Player	Score	To par
1	(United States) Sam Snead	72-68-74=214	−2
T2	(Canada) Stan Leonard	75-72-68=215	−1
T2	(United States) Arnold Palmer	73-73-69=215	−1
T2	(United States) Harvie Ward (a)	73-71-71=215	−1
5	(United States) Ed Furgol	73-71-72=216	E
T6	(United States) Jack Burke Jr.	71-72-74=217	+1
T6	(United States) Jimmy Demaret	72-70-75=217	+1
T6	(United States) Doug Ford	72-73-72=217	+1
T9	(England) Henry Cotton	73-73-72=218	+2
T9	(Australia) Peter Thomson	72-73-73=218	+2

=== Final round ===
Sunday, April 7, 1957

==== Final leaderboard ====
Champion
Silver Cup winner (low amateur)
(a) = amateur
(c) = past champion

Top 10
Place	Player	Score	To par	Money (US$)
1	(United States) Doug Ford	72-73-72-66=283	−5	8,750
2	(United States) Sam Snead (c)	72-68-74-72=286	−2	4,375
3	(United States) Jimmy Demaret (c)	72-70-75-70=287	−1	2,625
4	(United States) Harvie Ward (a)	73-71-71-73=288	E	0
5	(Australia) Peter Thomson	72-73-73-71=289	+1	1,750
6	(United States) Ed Furgol	73-71-72-74=290	+2	1,313
T7	(United States) Jack Burke Jr. (c)	71-72-74-74=291	+3	1,138
T7	(United States) Dow Finsterwald	74-74-73-70=291	+3	1,138
T7	(United States) Arnold Palmer	73-73-69-76=291	+3	1,138
10	(United States) Jay Hebert	74-72-76-70=292	+4	1,006

Leaderboard below the top 10
Place	Player	Score	To par	Money ($)
T11	(United States) Marty Furgol	73-74-73-73=293	+5	941
T11	(Canada) Stan Leonard	75-72-68-78=293	+5	941
T13	(England) Henry Cotton	73-73-72-76=294	+6	853
T13	(United States) Bud Taylor (a)	74-74-77-69=294	+6	0
T13	(United States) Ken Venturi	74-76-74-70=294	+6	853
T16	(Canada) Al Balding	73-73-73-76=295	+7	779
T16	(United States) Billy Casper	75-75-75-70=295	+7	779
T16	(United States) Mike Fetchick	74-73-72-76=295	+7	779
T16	(United States) Fred Hawkins	75-74-72-74=295	+7	779
T16	(United States) Byron Nelson (c)	74-72-73-76=295	+7	779
T21	(Australia) Bruce Crampton	72-75-78-71=296	+8	729
T21	(United States) Al Mengert	75-75-71-75=296	+8	729
T21	(United States) Henry Ransom	75-73-72-76=296	+8	729
T24	(United States) Johnny Palmer	77-73-73-74=297	+9	700
T24	(South Africa) Gary Player	77-72-75-73=297	+9	700
T26	(United States) Jerry Barber	73-77-78-70=298	+10	500
T26	(United States) Jack Fleck	76-74-75-73=298	+10	500
T28	(United States) Bill Johnston	77-70-78-74=299	+11	300
T28	(United States) Lawson Little	76-72-77-74=299	+11	300
T28	(United States) Lloyd Mangrum	77-71-74-77=299	+11	300
T31	(United States) Skee Riegel	73-74-78-75=300	+12	300
T31	(United States) Doug Sanders	76-72-75-77=300	+12	300
T31	(United States) Bud Ward	73-75-76-76=300	+12	300
34	(United States) Rex Baxter (a)	79-71-73-78=301	+13	0
T35	(United States) Dick Mayer	80-70-75-77=302	+14	300
T35	(United States) Henry Picard (c)	79-71-78-74=302	+14	300
T35	(United States) Sam Urzetta	74-73-78-77=302	+14	300
T38	(United States) Don Cherry (a)	78-72-76-77=303	+15	0
T38	(United States) Claude Harmon (c)	78-72-77-76=303	+15	300
40	(United States) Hillman Robbins (a)	77-73-74-80=304	+16	0
CUT	(United States) Tommy Bolt	74-77=151	+7	
CUT	(United States) Bruce Cudd (a)	74-77=151	+7	
CUT	(United States) Ben Hogan (c)	76-75=151	+7	
CUT	(United States) Gene Littler	76-75=151	+7	
CUT	(Canada) Moe Norman	77-74=151	+7	
CUT	(United States) Bill Ogden	74-77=151	+7	
CUT	(United States) Bob Toski	78-73=151	+7	
CUT	(United States) Art Wall Jr.	79-72=151	+7	
CUT	(South Africa) Trevor Wilkes	75-76=151	+7	
CUT	(United States) Ted Gleichmann (a)	76-76=152	+8	
CUT	(United States) Cary Middlecoff (c)	79-73=152	+8	
CUT	(United States) Bob Rosburg	76-76=152	+8	
CUT	(United States) Mike Souchak	78-74=152	+8	
CUT	(United States) Jim Turnesa	76-76=152	+8	
CUT	(United States) Errie Ball	75-78=153	+9	
CUT	(United States) Arnold Blum (a)	79-74=153	+9	
CUT	(United States) Gardner Dickinson	77-76=153	+9	
CUT	(United States) Paul Runyan	74-79=153	+9	
CUT	(United States) Lew Worsham	77-76=153	+9	
CUT	(United States) Dick Yost (a)	74-79=153	+9	
CUT	(United States) Walter Burkemo	79-75=154	+10	
CUT	(United States) Joe Conrad	78-76=154	+10	
CUT	(United States) Chick Harbert	79-75=154	+10	
CUT	(United States) Chuck Kocsis (a)	77-77=154	+10	
CUT	(United States) Denny Shute	75-79=154	+10	
CUT	(United States) Frank Stranahan	79-75=154	+10	
CUT	(United States) Pete Cooper	80-75=155	+11	
CUT	(United States) Vic Ghezzi	79-76=155	+11	
CUT	(United States) Fred Haas	74-81=155	+11	
CUT	(United States) Shelley Mayfield	78-77=155	+11	
CUT	(United States) Ed Meister (a)	80-75=155	+11	
CUT	(United States) Gene Sarazen (c)	80-75=155	+11	
CUT	(United States) Dick Chapman (a)	79-77=156	+12	
CUT	(United States) Dutch Harrison	75-81=156	+12	
CUT	(United States) Ted Kroll	79-77=156	+12	
CUT	(Canada) Jerry Magee (a)	77-79=156	+12	
CUT	(England) Harry Weetman	79-77=156	+12	
CUT	(United States) Joe Campbell (a)	78-79=157	+13	
CUT	(United States) Wes Ellis	80-77=157	+13	
CUT	(United States) Terl Johnson	77-80=157	+13	
CUT	(United States) Sam Parks Jr.	81-76=157	+13	
CUT	(United States) Julius Boros	79-79=158	+14	
CUT	(United States) William C. Campbell (a)	82-76=158	+14	
CUT	(United States) Chandler Harper	80-78=158	+14	
CUT	(United States) Herman Keiser (c)	80-78=158	+14	
CUT	(United States) Dale Morey (a)	80-78=158	+14	
CUT	(United States) Jimmy Jackson (a)	83-76=159	+15	
CUT	(United States) Horton Smith (c)	77-82=159	+15	
CUT	(United States) Craig Wood (c)	82-77=159	+15	
CUT	(United States) Billy Joe Patton (a)	77-83=160	+16	
CUT	(United States) Johnny Revolta	81-79=160	+16	
CUT	(United States) Johnny Bulla	80-82=162	+18	
CUT	(United States) Tony Manero	78-84=162	+18	
CUT	(United States) Bob Kay	88-78=166	+22	
CUT	(United States) Sarg Fontanini (a)	85-83=168	+24	
WD	(United States) Bob Hamilton	78	+6	
WD	(United States) Billy Maxwell	81	+9	
WD	(United States) Jock Hutchison	83	+11	
WD	(United States) Billy Burke	85	+13	
WD	(United States) Fred McLeod	88	+16	
DQ	(United States) Charles Coe (a)	86	+14	

==== Scorecard ====
Hole	1	2	3	4	5	6	7	8	9	10	11	12	13	14	15	16	17	18
Par	4	5	4	3	4	3	4	5	4	4	4	3	5	4	5	3	4	4
(United States) Ford	E	E	E	E	E	E	E	−1	−1	−1	−1	−2	−2	−3	−4	−4	−4	−5
(United States) Snead	−1	−2	−2	−3	−3	−3	−4	−4	−3	−2	−1	−1	E	+1	E	−1	−1	−2
(United States) Demaret	+1	+1	+1	+1	+1	E	E	E	E	+1	+1	+1	E	E	−1	−1	−1	−1
(United States) Ward	−1	−1	E	E	E	−1	−1	−1	E	E	+1	+2	+1	+1	+1	+1	+1	E
(Australia) Thomson	+2	+2	+1	+2	+2	+2	+2	+1	+1	+1	+1	+1	E	E	E	E	+1	+1
(United States) Furgol	−1	E	E	−1	+1	+2	+2	+1	+1	+1	+2	+3	+3	+3	+2	+2	+2	+2
(United States) Palmer	−1	−2	−2	−2	−1	E	E	−1	E	E	E	E	E	E	E	+3	+4	+3
(Canada) Leonard	−1	−1	−1	−1	−1	−1	−1	E	E	+2	+3	+3	+5	+5	+5	+5	+5	+5

Cumulative tournament scores, relative to par

Birdie	Bogey	Double bogey	Triple bogey+
