= 1956 Masters Tournament =

- Front cover of the 1956 Masters Guide

Tournament information
- Dates: April 5–8, 1956
- Location: Augusta, Georgia; 33.503°N 82.020°W
- Course: Augusta National Golf Club
- Organized by: Augusta National Golf Club
- Tour: PGA Tour

Statistics
- Par: 72
- Length: 6,965 yards (6,369 m)
- Field: 84 players
- Cut: None
- Winner's share: $6,000

Champion
- (United States) Jack Burke Jr.
- 289 (+1)

Location map
- Location in the United States Location in Georgia

The 1956 Masters Tournament was the 20th Masters Tournament, held April 5–8 at Augusta National Golf Club in Augusta, Georgia.

Jack Burke Jr. won his first major championship and only Masters, one stroke ahead of amateur Ken Venturi. It was the final Masters played without a 36-hole cut. CBS televised the third and fourth rounds of the tournament for the first time, and has done so every year since.

Burke shot a 71 (−1) on Sunday, one of only two players to break par in the final round; he rallied from a tournament record eight shots back to pass Venturi, who had led the entire tournament. Then a 24-year-old amateur, Venturi opened with a first round 66 (−6), the best round to date at the Masters by an amateur. But on Sunday, he shot a 42 (+6) on the final nine holes to card a disappointing 80 (+8). Burke's 289, along with Sam Snead in 1954 and Zach Johnson in 2007, remains the highest winning total in Masters history.

Burke was late arriving at the course for his final round on Sunday after going to church and had only fifteen minutes to warm up. He won a second (and final) major title in late July at the PGA Championship, in its penultimate edition as a match play competition.

== Field ==
1. Masters champions

Jimmy Demaret, Claude Harmon, Ben Hogan (2,4,6,9,10), Cary Middlecoff (2,7,9,10,12), Byron Nelson (2,6,9), Henry Picard (6), Gene Sarazen (2,4,6), Horton Smith, Sam Snead (4,6,7,9,10), Craig Wood

- Ralph Guldahl (2) and Herman Keiser did not play.

2. U.S. Open champions

Julius Boros (9,10), Billy Burke, Johnny Farrell, Jack Fleck (10), Ed Furgol (9), Lawson Little (3,5), Tony Manero, Lloyd Mangrum (9), Fred McLeod, Sam Parks Jr., George Sargent, Lew Worsham (12)

3. U.S. Amateur champions

Dick Chapman (5,a), Gene Littler (9,10), Billy Maxwell (9), Arnold Palmer (9,10), Skee Riegel (9), Sam Urzetta, Harvie Ward (5,8,9,10,11,a)

4. British Open champions

Jock Hutchison (6), Denny Shute (6)

5. British Amateur champions

Joe Conrad (8,9,a), Frank Stranahan (9,10)

6. PGA champions

Walter Burkemo (9), Doug Ford (7,10,12), Vic Ghezzi, Chick Harbert (7), Johnny Revolta, Jim Turnesa

7. Members of the U.S. 1955 Ryder Cup team

Jerry Barber, Tommy Bolt (9,10,12), Jack Burke Jr. (9,10,12), Ted Kroll

- Marty Furgol and Chandler Harper (6) did not play.

8. Members of the U.S. 1955 Walker Cup team

Rex Baxter (a), William C. Campbell (a), Don Cherry (a), Bruce Cudd (a), Jimmy Jackson (a), Ed Meister (a), Dale Morey (a), Billy Joe Patton (a)

- Dick Yost (a) did not play. Baxter and Meister were reserves for the team.

9. Top 24 players and ties from the 1955 Masters Tournament

Pete Cooper, Jay Hebert, Dick Mayer, Johnny Palmer, Bob Rosburg (10), Mike Souchak (10)

10. Top 24 players and ties from the 1955 U.S. Open

Bob Harris, Fred Hawkins (12), Bud Holscher, Walker Inman, Shelley Mayfield (12), Al Mengert, George Schneiter, Ernie Vossler, Art Wall Jr.

- Smiley Quick did not play.

11. 1955 U.S. Amateur quarter-finalists

Bill Booe (a), Joe Campbell (a), Ed Hopkins (a), Bill Hyndman (a), Charles Kunkle (a), Jim McCoy (a), Hillman Robbins (9,a)

12. 1955 PGA Championship quarter-finalists

Don Fairfield

13. One player, either amateur or professional, not already qualified, selected by a ballot of ex-Masters champions

Ken Venturi (a)

14. One amateur, not already qualified, selected by a ballot of ex-U.S. Amateur champions

Don Bisplinghoff (a)

15. One professional, not already qualified, selected by a ballot of ex-U.S. Open champions

Fred Haas

16. Two players, not already qualified, from a points list based on finishes in the winter part of the 1956 PGA Tour

Dow Finsterwald, Lionel Hebert

17. Foreign invitations

Al Balding, Henry Cotton (4), Roberto De Vicenzo, Stan Leonard (9), Moe Norman (a)

- Numbers in brackets indicate categories that the player would have qualified under had they been American.

== Round summaries ==
=== First round ===
Thursday, April 5, 1956

Place	Player	Score	To par
1	(United States) Ken Venturi (a)	66	−6
2	(United States) Cary Middlecoff	67	−5
T3	(United States) Tommy Bolt	68	−4
T3	(United States) Shelley Mayfield	68	−4
5	(United States) Ben Hogan	69	−3
T6	(United States) Doug Ford	70	−2
T6	(United States) Bob Rosburg	70	−2
T6	(United States) Billy Joe Patton (a)	70	−2
T9	(United States) Jerry Barber	71	−1
T9	(United States) Fred Hawkins	71	−1

=== Second round ===
Friday, April 6, 1956

Place	Player	Score	To par
1	(United States) Ken Venturi (a)	66-69=135	−9
2	(United States) Cary Middlecoff	67-72=139	−5
T3	(United States) Tommy Bolt	68-74=142	−2
T3	(United States) Pete Cooper	72-70=142	−2
T3	(United States) Doug Ford	70-72=142	−2
T3	(United States) Shelley Mayfield	68-74=142	−2
T7	(United States) Jack Burke Jr.	72-71=143	−1
T7	(United States) Jerry Barber	71-72=143	−1
T9	(United States) Fred Hawkins	71-73=144	E
T9	(United States) Bob Rosburg	70-74=144	E

=== Third round ===
Saturday, April 7, 1956

Place	Player	Score	To par
1	(United States) Ken Venturi (a)	66-69-75=210	−6
2	(United States) Cary Middlecoff	67-72-75=214	−2
3	(United States) Doug Ford	70-72-75=217	+1
T4	(United States) Jack Burke Jr.	72-71-75=218	+2
T4	(United States) Lloyd Mangrum	72-74-72=218	+2
T6	(United States) Jerry Barber	71-72-76=219	+3
T6	(United States) Pete Cooper	72-70-77=219	+3
T8	(United States) Tommy Bolt	68-74-78=220	+4
T8	(United States) Fred Hawkins	71-73-76=220	+4
T8	(United States) Mike Souchak	73-73-74=220	+4

=== Final round ===
Sunday, April 8, 1956

==== Final leaderboard ====
Champion
Silver Cup winner (low amateur)
(a) = amateur
(c) = past champion

Top 10
Place	Player	Score	To par	Money (US$)
1	(United States) Jack Burke Jr.	72-71-75-71=289	+1	6,000
2	(United States) Ken Venturi (a)	66-69-75-80=290	+2	0
3	(United States) Cary Middlecoff (c)	67-72-75-77=291	+3	3,750
T4	(United States) Lloyd Mangrum	72-74-72-74=292	+4	2,325
T4	(United States) Sam Snead (c)	73-76-72-71=292	+4	2,325
T6	(United States) Jerry Barber	71-72-76-75=294	+6	1,350
T6	(United States) Doug Ford	70-72-75-77=294	+6	1,350
T8	(United States) Tommy Bolt	68-74-78-76=296	+8	975
T8	(United States) Ben Hogan (c)	69-78-74-75=296	+8	975
T8	(United States) Shelley Mayfield	68-74-80-74=296	+8	975

Leaderboard below the top 10
Place	Player	Score	To par	Money ($)
11	(United States) Johnny Palmer	76-74-74-73=297	+9	825
T12	(United States) Pete Cooper	72-70-77-79=298	+10	735
T12	(United States) Gene Littler	73-77-74-74=298	+10	735
T12	(United States) Billy Joe Patton (a)	70-76-79-73=298	+10	0
T12	(United States) Sam Urzetta	73-75-76-74=298	+10	735
16	(United States) Bob Rosburg	70-74-81-74=299	+11	675
T17	(United States) Walter Burkemo	72-74-78-76=300	+12	660
T17	(Argentina) Roberto De Vicenzo	75-72-78-75=300	+12	660
T17	(United States) Hillman Robbins (a)	73-73-78-76=300	+12	0
T17	(United States) Mike Souchak	73-73-74-80=300	+12	660
21	(United States) Arnold Palmer	73-75-74-79=301	+13	630
T22	(United States) Frank Stranahan	72-75-79-76=302	+14	630
T22	(United States) Jim Turnesa	74-74-74-80=302	+14	630
T24	(United States) Julius Boros	73-78-72-80=303	+15	480
T24	(United States) Dow Finsterwald	74-73-79-77=303	+15	480
T24	(United States) Ed Furgol	74-75-78-76=303	+15	480
T24	(Canada) Stan Leonard	75-75-79-74=303	+15	480
T24	(United States) Al Mengert	74-72-79-78=303	+15	480
T29	(Canada) Al Balding	75-78-77-74=304	+16	300
T29	(United States) Vic Ghezzi	74-77-77-76=304	+16	300
T29	(United States) Fred Haas	78-72-75-79=304	+16	300
T29	(United States) Fred Hawkins	71-73-76-84=304	+16	300
T29	(United States) Walker Inman	73-75-74-82=304	+16	300
T34	(United States) Jimmy Demaret (c)	73-75-76-81=305	+17	300
T34	(United States) Billy Maxwell	75-75-81-74=305	+17	300
T34	(United States) Art Wall Jr.	75-80-75-75=305	+17	300
T34	(United States) Harvie Ward (a)	76-70-81-78=305	+17	0
T34	(United States) Lew Worsham	74-72-80-79=305	+17	300
39	(United States) Byron Nelson (c)	73-75-78-80=306	+18	300
T40	(United States) Chick Harbert	73-76-78-80=307	+19	300
T40	(United States) Bob Harris	73-79-77-78=307	+19	300
T40	(United States) Skee Riegel	72-79-76-80=307	+19	300
T43	(United States) William C. Campbell (a)	77-78-77-76=308	+20	0
T43	(United States) Jack Fleck	74-77-76-81=308	+20	300
T43	(United States) Dick Mayer	75-74-81-78=308	+20	300
T46	(United States) Rex Baxter (a)	76-79-79-75=309	+21	0
T46	(United States) Claude Harmon (c)	77-79-76-77=309	+21	300
T46	(United States) Henry Picard (c)	75-76-82-76=309	+21	300
T49	(United States) Bud Holscher	73-81-80-76=310	+22	300
T49	(United States) Gene Sarazen (c)	77-75-78-80=310	+22	300
T51	(United States) Jimmy Jackson (a)	77-74-76-84=311	+23	0
T51	(United States) Ted Kroll	75-75-79-82=311	+23	300
T53	(United States) Bruce Cudd (a)	78-77-84-74=313	+25	0
T53	(United States) Jay Hebert	74-76-82-81=313	+25	300
T53	(United States) Bill Hyndman (a)	79-77-77-80=313	+25	0
T56	(United States) Joe Campbell (a)	77-80-78-79=314	+26	0
T56	(United States) Ed Hopkins (a)	76-76-82-80=314	+26	0
T58	(United States) Don Bisplinghoff (a)	77-80-81-78=316	+28	0
T58	(United States) Don Fairfield	78-75-77-86=316	+28	300
T58	(United States) Ed Meister (a)	78-78-84-76=316	+28	0
T61	(United States) Joe Conrad (a)	76-79-81-81=317	+29	0
T61	(United States) Lionel Hebert	77-77-80-83=317	+29	300
T61	(United States) Ernie Vossler	78-79-83-77=317	+29	300
64	(United States) George Schneiter	77-80-82-79=318	+30	300
T65	(United States) Dick Chapman (a)	79-82-82-76=319	+31	0
T65	(United States) Dale Morey (a)	83-75-83-78=319	+31	0
T65	(United States) Sam Parks Jr.	80-82-76-81=319	+31	300
T68	(England) Henry Cotton	77-83-81-80=321	+33	300
T68	(United States) Jim McCoy (a)	77-81-81-82=321	+33	0
70	(United States) Craig Wood (c)	76-80-78-88=322	+34	300
71	(United States) Denny Shute	82-79-89-74=324	+36	300
T72	(United States) Don Cherry (a)	79-81-81-84=325	+37	0
T72	(United States) Lawson Little	77-81-85-82=325	+37	300
74	(United States) Bill Booe (a)	82-80-87-77=326	+38	0
75	(United States) Johnny Revolta	84-81-79-84=328	+40	300
76	(United States) Horton Smith (c)	86-84-84-82=336	+48	300
77	(United States) Charles Kunkle (a)	78-82-85-95=340	+52	0
WD	(United States) Johnny Farrell	79-86-86=251	+35	
WD	(Canada) Moe Norman (a)	75-78=153	+9	
WD	(United States) Billy Burke	80-80=160	+16	
WD	(United States) Tony Manero	81-80=161	+17	
WD	(United States) Fred McLeod	90-88=178	+34	
WD	(United States) Jock Hutchison	83	+11	
WD	(United States) George Sargent			

==== Scorecard ====
Hole	1	2	3	4	5	6	7	8	9	10	11	12	13	14	15	16	17	18
Par	4	5	4	3	4	3	4	5	4	4	4	3	5	4	5	3	4	4
(United States) Burke	+2	+1	+1	+1	+1	+1	+1	+1	+1	+1	+2	+1	+1	+2	+2	+2	+1	+1
(United States) Venturi	−5	−5	−5	−5	−5	−5	−5	−5	−4	−3	−2	−1	−1	E	+1	+1	+2	+2
(United States) Middlecoff	−3	−4	−4	−3	−1	−1	+1	+1	E	+1	+1	+1	+1	+1	+1	+1	+3	+3

Cumulative tournament scores, relative to par

Eagle	Birdie	Bogey	Double bogey
