= 1955 Masters Tournament =

- Front cover of the 1955 Masters Guide

Tournament information
- Dates: April 7–10, 1955
- Location: Augusta, Georgia; 33.503°N 82.020°W
- Course: Augusta National Golf Club
- Organized by: Augusta National Golf Club
- Tour: PGA Tour

Statistics
- Par: 72
- Length: 6,950 yards (6,355 m)
- Field: 78 players
- Cut: None
- Prize fund: $25,000
- Winner's share: $5,000

Champion
- (United States) Cary Middlecoff
- 279 (−9)
- Location in the United States Location in Georgia

The 1955 Masters Tournament was the 19th Masters Tournament, held April 7–10 at Augusta National Golf Club in Augusta, Georgia. It was the last one before CBS began televising the tournament the following year.

Cary Middlecoff shot a 65 in the second round, including a then-record 31 on the first nine, to win his only Masters, seven strokes ahead of runner-up Ben Hogan, and the second of his three major championships.

After a third round at even-par 72, Middlecoff entered the final round with a four shot lead over Hogan, the champion in 1951 and 1953. The victory margin of seven strokes was a tournament record for ten years, until Jack Nicklaus won by nine strokes over Arnold Palmer and Gary Player in 1965, later increased to twelve in 1997 by Tiger Woods. The previous record was five strokes, set in 1948 by Claude Harmon and tied by Hogan in 1953. The runner-up finish was Hogan's fourth at the Masters.

Arnold Palmer, a professional for less than a year, finished tied for tenth in his first Masters.

The Sarazen Bridge, approaching the left side of the 15th green, was dedicated on Wednesday to commemorate the 20th anniversary of Gene Sarazen's double eagle in 1935. Included was a contest to duplicate the 232-yard (212 m) shot, with the closest by Fred Haas at 4 feet 1 inch (1.24 m) away.

== Course ==
Hole	Name	Yards	Par	Hole	Name	Yards	Par
1	White Pine	400	4	10	Camellia	470	4
2	Woodbine	555	5	11	Dogwood	445	4
3	Flowering Peach	355	4	12	Golden Bell	155	3
4	Palm	220	3	13	Azalea	470	5
5	Magnolia	450	4	14	Spanish Dagger	420	4
6	Juniper	190	3	15	Firethorn	505	5
7	Pampas	365	4	16	Redbud	190	3
8	Yellow Jasmine	520	5	17	Nandina	400	4
9	Carolina Cherry	420	4	18	Holly	420	4
Out		3,475	36	In		3,475	36
Source:				Total		6,950	72

^ Holes 1, 2, 4, 11, and 14 were later renamed.

== Field ==
1. Masters champions

Claude Harmon (10), Ben Hogan (2,4,6,9,10), Herman Keiser, Byron Nelson (2,6,9), Henry Picard (6), Gene Sarazen (2,4,6), Horton Smith, Sam Snead (4,6,9,10,12), Craig Wood (2)

- Jimmy Demaret and Ralph Guldahl (2) did not play.

2. U.S. Open champions

Julius Boros (9,10), Billy Burke, Johnny Farrell, Ed Furgol (10), Lawson Little (3,5), Tony Manero, Lloyd Mangrum (9,10), Fred McLeod, Cary Middlecoff (9,10,12), Sam Parks Jr., Lew Worsham (9,10)

3. U.S. Amateur champions

Ted Bishop (a), Dick Chapman (5,9,10,a), Charles Coe (9,a), Gene Littler (9,10), Billy Maxwell, Arnold Palmer (11), Skee Riegel (9), Jess Sweetser (5,a), Bud Ward

4. British Open champions

Jock Hutchison (6), Denny Shute (6)

5. British Amateur champions

Frank Stranahan, Robert Sweeny Jr. (11,a), Harvie Ward (8,9,a)

6. PGA champions

Walter Burkemo (9,12), Vic Ghezzi, Chick Harbert (9,12), Chandler Harper, Johnny Revolta, Jim Turnesa

7. Members of the U.S. 1955 Ryder Cup team

- Team not selected in time for inclusion

8. Members of the U.S. 1955 Walker Cup team

Rex Baxter (a), William C. Campbell (10,a), Don Cherry (11,a), Joe Conrad (a), Bruce Cudd (a), Jimmy Jackson (a), Ed Meister (11,a), Dale Morey (11,a), Billy Joe Patton (9,10,a), Hillman Robbins (a)

- Dick Yost (a) did not play. Baxter, Meister and Robbins were reserves for the team.

9. Top 24 players and ties from the 1954 Masters Tournament

Jerry Barber (12), Al Besselink, Tommy Bolt (10,12), Jack Burke Jr. (10), Pete Cooper, Marty Furgol (10), Jay Hebert (10), Ed Oliver, Bob Rosburg, Earl Stewart, Bob Toski (10)

- Dutch Harrison and Ken Venturi (a) did not play.

10. Top 24 players and ties from the 1954 U.S. Open

Max Evans, Leland Gibson, Fred Haas, Dick Mayer, Shelley Mayfield (12), Al Mengert, Johnny Weitzel

11. 1954 U.S. Amateur quarter-finalists

Ted Lenczyk (a), Davis Love Jr. (a)

- Ed Martin (a) did not play.

12. 1954 PGA Championship quarter-finalists

13. One amateur, not already qualified, selected by a ballot of ex-U.S. Amateur champions

Bill Goodloe (a)

14. One professional, not already qualified, selected by a ballot of ex-U.S. Open champions

Johnny Palmer

15. Two players, not already qualified, from a points list based on finishes in the winter part of the 1955 PGA Tour

Mike Souchak, Bo Wininger

16. Foreign invitations

Pat Fletcher, Rudy Horvath (10), Stan Leonard, Peter Thomson (4,9)

- Numbers in brackets indicate categories that the player would have qualified under had they been American.

== Round summaries ==
=== First round ===
Thursday, April 7, 1955

Place	Player	Score	To par
1	(United States) Jack Burke Jr.	67	−5
T2	(United States) Julius Boros	71	−1
T2	(United States) Mike Souchak	71	−1
T4	(United States) Cary Middlecoff	72	E
T4	(United States) Byron Nelson	72	E
T4	(United States) Bob Rosburg	72	E
T4	(United States) Sam Snead	72	E
T8	(United States) Walter Burkemo	73	+1
T8	(United States) Pete Cooper	73	+1
T8	(United States) Ben Hogan	73	+1
T8	(United States) Skee Riegel	73	+1

=== Second round ===
Friday, April 8, 1955

Place	Player	Score	To par
1	(United States) Cary Middlecoff	72-65=137	−7
2	(United States) Ben Hogan	73-68=141	−3
T3	(United States) Jack Burke Jr.	67-76=143	−1
T3	(United States) Sam Snead	72-71=143	−1
5	(United States) Bob Rosburg	72-72=144	E
6	(United States) Mike Souchak	71-74=145	+1
T7	(United States) Tommy Bolt	76-70=146	+2
T7	(United States) Julius Boros	71-75=146	+2
T7	(United States) Walter Burkemo	73-73=146	+2
T7	(United States) Pete Cooper	73-73=146	+2
T7	(United States) Ed Furgol	74-72=146	+2
T7	(United States) Skee Riegel	73-73=146	+2
T7	(United States) Harvie Ward (a)	77-69=146	+2

=== Third round ===
Saturday, April 9, 1955

Place	Player	Score	To par
1	(United States) Cary Middlecoff	72-65-72=209	−7
2	(United States) Ben Hogan	73-68-72=213	−3
3	(United States) Jack Burke Jr.	67-76-71=214	−2
4	(United States) Bob Rosburg	72-72-72=216	E
T5	(United States) Sam Snead	72-71-74=217	+1
T5	(United States) Mike Souchak	71-74-72=217	+1
T7	(United States) Julius Boros	71-75-72=218	+2
T7	(United States) Walter Burkemo	73-73-72=218	+2
T7	(Canada) Stan Leonard	77-73-68=218	+2
T10	(United States) Lloyd Mangrum	74-73-72=219	+3
T10	(United States) Skee Riegel	73-73-73=219	+3

=== Final round ===
Sunday, April 10, 1955

==== Final leaderboard ====
Champion
Silver Cup winner (low amateur)
(a) = amateur
(c) = past champion

Top 10
Place	Player	Score	To par	Money (US$)
1	(United States) Cary Middlecoff	72-65-72-70=279	−9	5,000
2	(United States) Ben Hogan (c)	73-68-72-73=286	−2	3,125
3	(United States) Sam Snead (c)	72-71-74-70=287	−1	2,125
T4	(United States) Julius Boros	71-75-72-71=289	+1	1,333
T4	(United States) Bob Rosburg	72-72-72-73=289	+1	1,333
T4	(United States) Mike Souchak	71-74-72-72=289	+1	1,333
7	(United States) Lloyd Mangrum	74-73-72-72=291	+3	875
T8	(Canada) Stan Leonard	77-73-68-74=292	+4	813
T8	(United States) Harvie Ward (a)	77-69-75-71=292	+4	0
T10	(United States) Dick Mayer	78-72-72-71=293	+5	696
T10	(United States) Byron Nelson (c)	72-75-74-72=293	+5	696
T10	(United States) Arnold Palmer	76-76-72-69=293	+5	696

Leaderboard below the top 10
Place	Player	Score	To par	Money ($)
T13	(United States) Jack Burke Jr.	67-76-71-80=294	+6	594
T13	(United States) Skee Riegel	73-73-73-75=294	+6	594
T15	(United States) Walter Burkemo	73-73-72-77=295	+7	563
T15	(United States) Jay Hebert	75-74-74-72=295	+7	563
T15	(United States) Frank Stranahan	77-76-71-71=295	+7	563
T18	(United States) Joe Conrad (a)	77-71-74-75=297	+9	0
T18	(United States) Billy Maxwell	77-72-77-71=297	+9	525
T18	(United States) Johnny Palmer	77-73-72-75=297	+9	525
T18	(Australia) Peter Thomson	74-73-74-76=297	+9	525
T22	(United States) Tommy Bolt	76-70-77-75=298	+10	513
T22	(United States) Gene Littler	75-72-76-75=298	+10	513
T24	(United States) Pete Cooper	73-73-78-75=299	+11	500
T24	(United States) Ed Furgol	74-72-78-75=299	+11	500
T24	(United States) Hillman Robbins (a)	77-76-74-72=299	+11	0
27	(United States) Max Evans	76-75-75-76=302	+14	500
T28	(United States) Bill Goodloe (a)	74-73-81-75=303	+15	0
T28	(United States) Claude Harmon (c)	77-75-78-73=303	+15	250
T30	(United States) Don Cherry (a)	79-75-78-72=304	+16	0
T30	(United States) Bud Ward	77-73-77-77=304	+16	250
T32	(United States) Charles Coe (a)	74-77-76-78=305	+17	0
T32	(Canada) Pat Fletcher	76-75-77-77=305	+17	250
T32	(United States) Chick Harbert	76-80-73-76=305	+17	250
T32	(United States) Al Mengert	79-71-78-77=305	+17	250
T36	(United States) Billy Burke	75-78-77-76=306	+18	250
T36	(United States) William C. Campbell (a)	77-73-80-76=306	+18	0
T36	(United States) Bruce Cudd (a)	75-74-79-78=306	+18	0
T36	(United States) Shelley Mayfield	77-73-80-76=306	+18	250
T36	(United States) Denny Shute	78-71-77-80=306	+18	250
T41	(United States) Henry Picard (c)	78-79-75-75=307	+19	250
T41	(United States) Bob Toski	78-71-79-79=307	+19	250
T43	(United States) Marty Furgol	79-74-79-76=308	+20	250
T43	(United States) Leland Gibson	81-75-75-77=308	+20	250
T43	(Canada) Rudy Horvath	79-77-76-76=308	+20	250
T43	(United States) Jimmy Jackson (a)	79-75-77-77=308	+20	0
T43	(United States) Earl Stewart	78-80-72-78=308	+20	250
48	(United States) Jim Turnesa	77-75-79-78=309	+21	250
T49	(United States) Billy Joe Patton (a)	79-76-77-78=310	+22	0
T49	(United States) Johnny Revolta	75-78-79-78=310	+22	250
T49	(United States) Johnny Weitzel	78-80-78-74=310	+22	250
T49	(United States) Lew Worsham	80-75-79-76=310	+22	250
T53	(United States) Dick Chapman (a)	74-79-73-85=311	+23	0
T53	(United States) Vic Ghezzi	78-79-77-77=311	+23	250
T53	(United States) Ed Oliver	77-76-81-77=311	+23	250
T56	(United States) Jerry Barber	75-77-77-83=312	+24	250
T56	(United States) Herman Keiser (c)	82-79-75-76=312	+24	250
58	(United States) Rex Baxter (a)	74-76-80-83=313	+25	0
T59	(United States) Ted Lenczyk (a)	77-80-77-81=315	+27	0
T59	(United States) Horton Smith (c)	81-81-79-74=315	+27	250
61	(United States) Sam Parks Jr.	80-80-78-78=316	+28	250
62	(United States) Craig Wood (c)	81-81-79-76=317	+29	250
T63	(United States) Al Besselink	80-75-80-83=318	+30	250
T63	(United States) Dale Morey (a)	82-77-81-78=318	+30	0
65	(United States) Lawson Little	81-77-77-84=319	+31	250
66	(United States) Bo Wininger	81-74-81-84=320	+32	250
67	(United States) Ed Meister (a)	86-87-74-77=324	+36	0
68	(United States) Davis Love Jr. (a)	82-85-83-77=327	+39	0
WD	(United States) Ted Bishop (a)	79-76-80=235	+19	
WD	(United States) Fred Haas	75-77=152	+8	
WD	(United States) Chandler Harper	77-79=156	+12	
WD	(United States) Gene Sarazen (c)	83-80=163	+19	
WD	(United States) Johnny Farrell	81-84=165	+21	
WD	(United States) Jess Sweetser (a)	79	+7	
WD	(United States) Jock Hutchison	83	+11	
WD	(United States) Tony Manero	87	+15	
WD	(United States) Fred McLeod	91	+19	
WD	(United States) Robert Sweeny Jr. (a)			

==== Scorecard ====
Hole	1	2	3	4	5	6	7	8	9	10	11	12	13	14	15	16	17	18
Par	4	5	4	3	4	3	4	5	4	4	4	3	5	4	5	3	4	4
(United States) Middlecoff	−7	−8	−8	−8	−7	−8	−9	−9	−9	−7	−7	−8	−8	−8	−9	−9	−8	−9
(United States) Hogan	−3	−3	−3	−3	−2	−2	−2	−3	−3	−2	−1	−1	−2	−2	−2	−2	−2	−2
(United States) Snead	E	E	E	E	E	+1	+1	+1	+1	+1	+1	+1	E	E	−1	−1	−1	−1
(United States) Boros	+2	+2	+2	+2	+3	+3	+4	+4	+4	+4	+4	+4	+3	+3	+2	+1	+1	+1
(United States) Rosburg	+1	+1	+1	+2	+3	+3	+3	+3	+3	+3	+3	+3	+2	+3	+1	+1	+1	+1
(United States) Souchak	+1	E	E	E	E	E	E	−1	E	E	E	E	+1	+1	E	+1	+1	+1
(United States) Burke	−1	−1	−1	−1	−1	−1	−1	−1	−1	E	E	+1	+5	+5	+5	+5	+6	+6

Cumulative tournament scores, relative to par

Eagle	Birdie	Bogey	Double bogey	Triple bogey +
