= Pacific Northwest Amateur =

Annual amateur golf tournament in the USA

The Pacific Northwest Amateur is an annual amateur golf tournament. It is one of the oldest amateur tournaments in the United States having first been played in 1899. It is organized by the Pacific Northwest Golf Association (PNGA) and the tournament is also known as the PNGA Men's Amateur. It is played at a variety of courses in the Pacific Northwest.

== Winners ==
- 2026 Byungho Lee
- 2025 Sam Renner
- 2024 Sam Renner
- 2023 Joshua Koo
- 2022 Paul Mitzel
- 2021 Alfred Raja
- 2020 Canceled
- 2019 Laurent Desmarchais
- 2018 Mitchell Baldridge
- 2017 Emmett Oh
- 2016 Yuan Yechun
- 2015 Anthony Quayle
- 2014 James Beale
- 2013 Cameron Peck
- 2012 Shotaro Ban
- 2011 Zac Blair
- 2010 Brett Drewitt
- 2009 Tyler Matthews
- 2008 Jason Kang
- 2007 Jake Younan-Wise
- 2006 Danny Green
- 2005 Jordan Madison
- 2004 David Fern
- 2003 Nick Flanagan
- 2002 Brady Stockton
- 2001 Jason Hartwick
- 2000 Jeff Quinney
- 1999 Michael Beard
- 1998 Jeff Quinney
- 1997 Ben Crane
- 1996 Joel Kribel
- 1995 Birk Nelson
- 1994 Tiger Woods
- 1993 Chris Jorgensen
- 1992 Scott Bennett
- 1991 Craig Kanada
- 1990 Warren Vickers
- 1989 Todd Kernaghan
- 1988 Mike Swingle
- 1987 Scott Sullivan
- 1986 Jim Strickland
- 1985 Mike Hegarty
- 1984 Jeff Ellis
- 1983 Dave DeLong
- 1982 Eric Johnson
- 1981 Rick Fehr
- 1980 Brian Haugen
- 1979 Mark Wiebe
- 1978 Scott Tuttle
- 1977 Jeff Coston
- 1976 Bill Sander
- 1975 Bob Mitchell
- 1974 Ed Jonson
- 1973 Dave Mick
- 1972 Jim McLean
- 1971 Jim McLean
- 1970 Pat Welch
- 1969 Jim McLean
- 1968 Allen Brooks
- 1967 Donny Power
- 1966 Elwin Fanning
- 1965 George Holland
- 1964 Mickey Shaw
- 1963 Ken Storey
- 1962 Kermit Zarley
- 1961 Harry Givan
- 1960 Ron Willey
- 1959 Ron Willey
- 1958 George Holland
- 1957 Bill Warner
- 1956 Bob Kidd
- 1955 Dick Yost
- 1954 Bob Fleming
- 1953 Dick Yost
- 1952 Bill Mawhinney
- 1951 Jack Westland
- 1950 Al Mengert
- 1949 Bruce McCormick
- 1948 Glen Sherriff
- 1947 Ray Weston
- 1946 Harry Givan
- 1945 Harry Givan
- 1942–44 No tournament
- 1941 Bud Ward
- 1940 Jack Westland
- 1939 Jack Westland
- 1938 Jack Westland
- 1937 Harry Givan
- 1936 Harry Givan
- 1935 Albert Campbell
- 1934 Kenneth Storey
- 1933 Albert Campbell
- 1932 Chandler Egan
- 1931 Frank Dolp
- 1930 Eddie Hogan
- 1929 Frank Dolp
- 1928 Oscar Willing
- 1927 Rudolph Wilhelm
- 1926 Forest Watson
- 1925 Chandler Egan
- 1924 Oscar Willing
- 1923 Chandler Egan
- 1922 George Von Elm
- 1921 George Von Elm
- 1920 Chandler Egan
- 1919 Clare Griswold
- 1918 H. A. Fleager
- 1917 Rudolph Wilhelm
- 1916 S. R. Smith
- 1915 Chandler Egan
- 1914 Jack Neville
- 1913 A. V. Macan
- 1912 R. N. Kincks
- 1911 W. B. Mixter
- 1910 R. L. MacLeay
- 1909 Douglas Grant
- 1908 George Ladd Munn
- 1907 T. S. Lippy
- 1906 C.K. Magill
- 1905 R. L. MacLeay
- 1904 R. L. MacLeay
- 1903 R. L. MacLeay
- 1902 F. C. Newton
- 1901 A. H. Goldfinch
- 1900 P. B. Gifford
- 1899 Charles H. Mallott
