= Don Cherry discography =

Don Cherry discography may refer to the discography of multiple musicians:

- Don Cherry (singer) discography (1924–2018), American traditional pop music and big band singer and golfer
- Don Cherry (trumpeter) discography (1936–1995), American jazz trumpeter
