= Jim McLean (golfer) =

American golf instructor (born 1950)

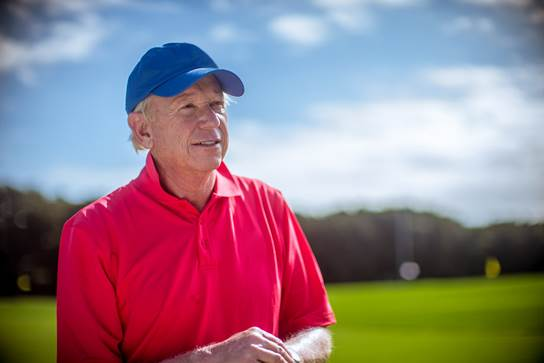
- McLean in 2018

Personal information
- Full name: James C. McLean
- Nationality: United States
- Born: May 18, 1950 (age 76)

Career
- Sport: Golf
- College: University of Houston
- Turned professional: 1973
- Professional wins: 2

Best results in major championships
- Masters Tournament: T43: 1972
- PGA Championship: DNP
- U.S. Open: CUT: 1971, 1972
- The Open Championship: DNP

Achievements and awards
- World Teacher's Golf Hall of Fame: 2018
- Pacific Northwest Golf Assoc. Hall of Fame: 2003
- National PGA Teacher of the Year: 1994

James C. McLean (born May 18, 1950) is a leading American golf instructor. He is known for coining the phrase “X-Factor”, observing that the greater the differential between the hips and shoulders at the top of the swing, the more power the golfer can create. McLean is CEO of the Jim McLean Golf School, which operates from seven locations.

== Amateur career ==
McLean was Washington State Junior Champion two times. He also won the Pacific Northwest Amateur three times. He also won The Seattle Amateur and The 4 States Amateur in Texarkana, Texas in 1972. McLean was an All-American at the University of Houston where he played for the golf team from 1969 to 1973. He had three college victories. He qualified for the U.S. Junior Amateur and the U.S. Amateur three times. His best result at the U.S. Amateur was fourth in 1971. McLean played in the 1972 Masters Tournament as an amateur, finishing tied for 43rd. He won the Pacific Coast Amateur in 1971 and was named first alternate to the U.S. Amateur World Cup team in 1972. McLean won 12 USGA medals for the U.S. Junior, U.S. Amateur, U.S. Open, and U.S. Senior Open.

== Professional career ==
McLean was a touring professional golfer for two years. He qualified for ten national club professional events, won the Westchester PGA Championship in the PGA Met Section, and won the National Skins Game held in Palm Springs, California. His first club professional position was as an assistant at Westchester Country Club. McLean was the director of golf at Sunningdale Country Club in Greenville, New York; Quaker Ridge Golf Club in Scarsdale, New York; Tamarisk Country Club in Rancho Mirage, California; Sleepy Hollow CC in Westchester, New York; and The Doral Golf Resort and Spa in Miami, Florida. McLean became a member of the South Florida PGA Hall of Fame in 2017 and the Miami Sports Hall of Fame in 2008. The PGA of America gave McLean the PGA National Player Development award in 2021.

== Broadcasting ==
McLean has been a golf analyst for CNBC for the PGA Champions Tour and was an analyst for NBC for the 1991 Ryder Cup Matches. He has been the co-host of Golf School on SiriusXM for 6 years and also an analyst for the major championships on Sirius XM PGA Tour Radio.

== Teaching ==
In 1991, McLean became the Director of Golf at Doral Resort in Miami, Florida (now named Trump National Doral). McLean started to run golf schools in the winter at Doral. In 1993, he established The Jim McLean Golf School. He has taught Tom Kite, Cristie Kerr, Liselotte Neumann, Lexi Thompson, Keegan Bradley, and Gary Woodland, all of whom have won professional major championships. Over 200 of his former assistants have become club head professionals or directors of instruction. McLean taught Russell Henley in 2022 and 2023. Henley was ranked #3 in the world in 2025. McLean is currently teaching Scarlett Schremmer who is on the golf team at the University of Miami. McLean is currently teaching James Nicholas and has taught numerous PGA and LPGA touring professionals. He has worked with Lucy Li, Ben Crenshaw, Curtis Strange, Sergio García, and Gary Player among others.

In 2017, McLean announced the relocation of the headquarters of his school to the Miami Biltmore Hotel.

McLean pioneered the use of video for golf instruction and was one of the first adopters of radar technology used in swing analysis tools like TrackMan. McLean's teaching philosophy is based on position teaching using detailed parameters, safety zones, and what he calls "The Powerline." He is also known for The X-Factor and The X-Factor Stretch.

Both of McLean's sons are golf professionals. Matt McLean teaches at Fishers Island Club in the summer months then at Bobby Jones Golf Club in Sarasota, Florida, in the winter. Jon McLean teaches at Shinnecock Hills in the summer months and is a Vice President for The Jim McLean Golf Schools.

== Books and videos ==
- The Eight Step Swing, ISBN 0060958006.
- The Putter’s Pocket Companion, ISBN 0060171898
- The Power Game Pocket Companion, ISBN 0060958006
- Ben Hogan. The Golf Swing, ISBN 0470876247
- The Wedge Game Pocket Companion, ISBN 006270141X
- The Jim McLean Golf Digest Ultimate Drill Book, ISBN 1592408451
- Golf Digest’s The Drill System for Better Golf, ISBN 1416592571
- The X-Factor, ISBN 0062701428
- The Slot Swing, ISBN 0470444991
- Golf School, ISBN 0385492871
- The 3 Scoring Clubs, ISBN 1592401171
- The Complete Idiot’s Guide to the Short Game, ISBN 0028638891
- The Jim McLean System: Your Swing Solution, ISBN 1635763711
- The Ultimate Guide to Trackman Swing Analysis (With Adam Kolloff) (2015).
- 18 Ways to Become the Undisputed #1 Business in Your Category.
- Build Your Swing. 2020.
- Power Golf Pocket Companion. 2020.
- Short Game Pocket Companion. 2020.
- The Houston Dynasty. 2026.
- X FACTOR II. 2026.

== Recognition ==
McLean was inducted into the Pacific Northwest Golf Association Hall of Fame in 2003. He is a member of the Pacific Northwest Hall of Fame, the MET PGA Hall of Fame, the South Florida PGA Hall of Fame, the Miami Sports Hall of Fame, and the Long Island Hall of Fame. He has consistently been recognized as a leading golf teacher and was inducted into the World Teachers Hall of Fame.

McLean has won the following PGA Awards:

- 1986 Metropolitan Teacher of the Year
- 1987 Metropolitan Horton Smith Award
- 1994 National PGA Teacher of the Year
- 1996 South Florida Teacher of the Year
- 1998 South Florida Teacher of the Year
- 2000 South Florida Junior Leader Award
- Golf Magazine: Top 100 Teachers in America
- Golf Digest: Ranked #3 Teacher in America for 25 years
- South Florida PGA Professional Development Award 2019
- PGA of America Professional Development National Award 2020
- Inducted into the PGA Hall of Fame in 2025

"The Golf Swing: Ben Hogan" video has won 6 awards (3 Aurora awards in 2000 and 3 Telly awards in 2001).

Sports Illustrated listed The Eight-Step Swing as one of the top golf books of the 20th Century.

== Amateur wins ==
- 1969 Pacific Northwest Amateur
- 1971 Pacific Coast Amateur, Pacific Northwest Amateur
- 1972 Pacific Northwest Amateur, Texas Amateur, Oklahoma Amateur, Arkansas Amateur, Louisiana Amateur

== Professional wins ==
- 1970 Northwest Open (as an amateur)
- 1987 Westchester PGA Championship
