= Jack Westland =

American politician and golfer (1904–1982)

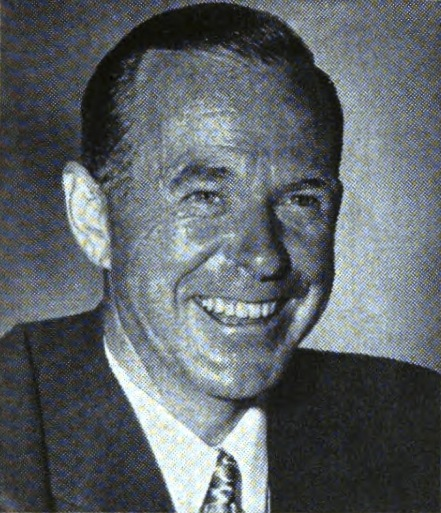

Member of the U.S. House of Representatives from Washington's 2nd district
- In office January 3, 1953 – January 3, 1965
- Preceded by: Scoop Jackson
- Succeeded by: Lloyd Meeds

Personal details
- Born: Alfred John Westland; December 14, 1904 Everett, Washington, U.S.
- Died: November 3, 1982 (aged 77) Pebble Beach, California, U.S.
- Party: Republican
- Spouses: Marcia Westland (m. 1931; div. 1957) Helen Geis (m. 1959)
- Education: University of Washington Law School

Jack Westland
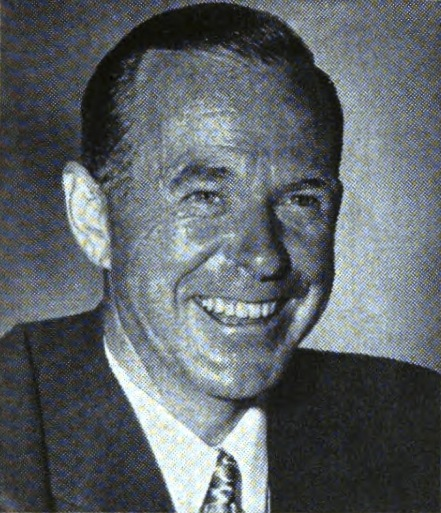

Personal information
- Nationality: United States

Career
- Sport: Golf
- Status: Amateur

Best results in major championships
- Masters Tournament: T53: 1953
- PGA Championship: DNP
- U.S. Open: T41: 1934
- The Open Championship: DNP
- U.S. Amateur: Won: 1952
- British Amateur: T33: 1934

Alfred John "Jack" Westland (December 14, 1904 – November 3, 1982) was an American politician who served as a member of the United States House of Representatives from 1953 to 1965. He represented the Second Congressional District of Washington as a Republican. He was also an accomplished amateur golfer.

== Political career ==
Westland was born in Everett, Washington. He was elected to the House in 1952, taking the seat previously held by Democrat Scoop Jackson who had won election to the United States Senate. Westland was re-elected in 1954, 1956, 1958, 1960, and 1962. Westland voted in favor of the Civil Rights Acts of 1957, 1960, and 1964, as well as the 24th Amendment to the U.S. Constitution. He was defeated in 1964 by Democrat Lloyd Meeds. Westland subsequently moved to California, where he lived until his death in 1982.

== Golf career ==
Westland was an accomplished amateur golfer for over 25 years. He won the 1929 French Amateur. He finished runner-up to Francis Ouimet in the 1931 U.S. Amateur. He won the 1933 Western Amateur and played on three Walker Cup teams (1932, 1934, 1953). He was also non-playing captain of the 1961 team. In 1952, at the age of 47, Westland won the U.S. Amateur over Al Mengert. He is the oldest golfer ever to win the Amateur.

Westland also won the Pacific Northwest Amateur four times (1938, 1939, 1940, 1951), the Washington State Amateur three times (1924, 1947, 1948) and the Chicago District Amateur three times (1927, 1929, 1934).

In 1978, Westland was inducted into the Pacific Northwest Golf Association's Hall of Fame.

== Tournament wins (13) ==
- 1924 Washington State Amateur
- 1927 Chicago District Amateur
- 1929 French Amateur, Chicago District Amateur
- 1933 Western Amateur
- 1934 Chicago District Amateur
- 1938 Pacific Northwest Amateur
- 1939 Pacific Northwest Amateur
- 1940 Pacific Northwest Amateur
- 1947 Washington State Amateur
- 1948 Washington State Amateur
- 1951 Pacific Northwest Amateur
- 1952 **U.S. Amateur**

Amateur majors shown in bold.

== Major championships ==
=== Amateur wins (1) ===
Year	Championship	Winning score	Runner-up
1952	U.S. Amateur	3 & 2	(United States) Al Mengert

=== Results timeline ===
Note: As an amateur, Westland could not play in the PGA Championship. He did not play in The Open Championship.

Tournament	1926	1927	1928	1929
Masters Tournament	NYF	NYF	NYF	NYF
U.S. Open	T43			
U.S. Amateur	R32		DNQ	
The Amateur Championship				

Tournament	1930	1931	1932	1933	1934	1935	1936	1937	1938	1939
Masters Tournament	NYF	NYF	NYF	NYF		63				
U.S. Open					T41				CUT	
U.S. Amateur	DNQ	2	R16	QF	R64	R32		R64		
The Amateur Championship					R64					

Tournament	1940	1941	1942	1943	1944	1945	1946	1947	1948	1949
Masters Tournament				NT	NT	NT				
U.S. Open			NT	NT	NT	NT				
U.S. Amateur			NT	NT	NT	NT		R256		
The Amateur Championship	NT	NT	NT	NT	NT	NT				

Tournament	1950	1951	1952	1953	1954	1955	1956	1957	1958	1959
Masters Tournament				T53						CUT
U.S. Open										
U.S. Amateur			**1**	R64						R64
The Amateur Championship										

Tournament	1960	1961
Masters Tournament		
U.S. Open		
U.S. Amateur		R128
The Amateur Championship		

Win
Top 10
Did not play

LA = Low Amateur
NYF = Tournament not yet founded
NT = No tournament
"T" indicates a tie for a place
DNQ = Did not qualify for match play portion
R256, R128, R64, R32, R16, QF, SF = Round in which player lost in match play

Sources: U.S. Open and U.S. Amateur, The Masters, 1934 British Amateur

== U.S. national team appearances ==
- Walker Cup: 1932 (winners), 1934 (winners), 1953 (winners), 1961 (winners, non-playing captain)

== See also ==
- Washington's congressional delegations

U.S. House of Representatives
Preceded by Henry M. Jackson	Member of the U.S. House of Representatives from Washington's 2nd congressional district 1953–1965	Succeeded by Lloyd Meeds
