= Lloyd Meeds =

American politician (1927–2005)

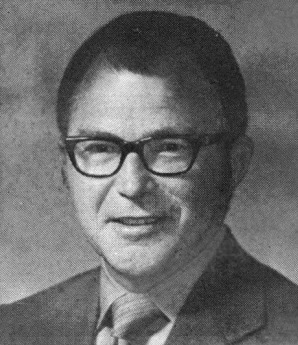

Member of the U.S. House of Representatives from Washington's 2nd district
- In office January 3, 1965 – January 3, 1979
- Preceded by: Jack Westland
- Succeeded by: Al Swift

Personal details
- Born: December 11, 1927 Dillon, Montana, U.S.
- Died: August 17, 2005 (aged 77) Church Creek, Maryland, U.S.
- Resting place: Arlington National Cemetery; Arlington, Virginia
- Party: Democratic
- Spouse: Mary Yang Meeds (his death)Barbara Meeds (divorce)
- Children: 3
- Education: Gonzaga University, (LL.B. 1958); Everett Junior College, 1950

Military service
- Allegiance: United States
- Branch/service: United States Navy
- Years of service: 1946–1947
- Rank: SPI3

Edwin Lloyd Meeds (December 11, 1927 – August 17, 2005) was an American politician who served as a member of the United States House of Representatives from 1965 to 1979. He represented the second district of Washington as a Democrat.

== Early years ==
Born in Dillon, Montana, Meeds moved with his family to Monroe, Washington, northeast of Seattle, in 1944. He graduated from Monroe High school in 1946, served in the United States Navy from 1946 to 1947, and graduated from Everett Junior College in 1950. Meeds owned and operated a gas station until 1954, when he returned to school. He earned his law degree from Gonzaga University in Spokane in 1958, and passed the bar; he was a prosecutor, briefly in Spokane County, then in Snohomish County.

== Congress ==
Meeds first won election to Congress in 1964 by defeating incumbent Republican Alfred Westland. Meeds won each of his subsequent bids for re-election with comfortable margins from 1966 up to 1974. In that year, when U.S. District Court Judge George Hugo Boldt ruled that treaties entitled Native Americans to half of the fish caught in their usual and customary fishing grounds, Meeds angered many of his constituents with his comment that the tribes had the law on their side and that people needed to move on. As a result, he won his 1976 reelection by only 542 votes, which led to his announcement in late 1977 that he would not seek re-election in 1978; he retired from the House and returned to practicing law in early 1979. His seat was won by former aide Al Swift.

While a congressman, Meeds was known for his work on conservation and education issues. He helped create the Alpine Lakes Wilderness Area and the North Cascades National Park. A memorial to Meeds was erected in 2007 at the Snow Lake trailhead near Snoqualmie Pass, in honor of his work for the creation of Alpine Lakes Wilderness. Snow Lake lies within Alpine Lakes and is one of the most popular day-hike destinations in it. Harvey Manning describes Meeds' work in wilderness preservation efforts in his 2007 book Wilderness Alps: Conservation and Conflict in Washington's North Cascades published by the North Cascades Conservation Council.

In contrast to his conservation efforts in Washington state, Meeds was central to efforts to limit land preservation in the bill that eventually became the Alaska National Interest Lands Conservation Act, signed into law by President Jimmy Carter in December 1980. Following his retirement from the House in 1979, he became a Washington lobbyist and worked closely with the state of Alaska, Representative Don Young (R-AK), and the Citizens for the Management of Alaskan Lands to limit the scope of federal land preservation in Alaska in the final bill.

== Later life ==
After his service in Congress ended in 1979, he stayed in the nation's capital as a partner in the law firm of Preston Gates Ellis, & Rouvelas Meeds, the D.C. office of Seattle-based Preston Gates & Ellis.

== Death ==
After suffering from lung cancer, Meeds died at age 77 at his home in Church Creek, Maryland, and is buried at Arlington National Cemetery. He was survived by his wife of 38 years, Mary Yang Meeds, and their daughter; he had two children from a previous marriage.

== See also ==
- Washington's congressional delegations

U.S. House of Representatives
Preceded by Jack Westland	Member of the U.S. House of Representatives from Washington's 2nd congressional district January 3, 1965 – January 3, 1979	Succeeded by Al Swift
