= 1953 Walker Cup =

Golf tournament

14th Walker Cup Match
- Dates: September 4–5, 1953
- Venue: The Kittansett Club
- Location: Marion, Massachusetts
- Captains: Charlie Yates (USA); Tony Duncan (GB&I)
(United States)	9	3	(United Kingdom) (Republic of Ireland)
- United States wins the Walker Cup

The 1953 Walker Cup, the 14th Walker Cup Match, was played on September 4 and 5, 1953, at the Kittansett Club, Marion, Massachusetts. The United States won by 9 matches to 3.

== Format ==
Four 36-hole matches of foursomes were played on Friday and eight singles matches on Saturday. Each of the 12 matches was worth one point in the larger team competition. If a match was all square after the 36th hole extra holes were not played. The team with most points won the competition. If the two teams were tied, the previous winner would retain the trophy.

== Teams ==
Ten players for the United States and Great Britain & Ireland participated in the event. Great Britain & Ireland had a playing captain, while the United States had a non-playing captain. Tony Duncan, the Great Britain and Ireland playing captain, did not select himself for any of the matches.

=== United States ===
Captain: Charlie Yates

- William C. Campbell
- Dick Chapman
- Don Cherry
- Charles Coe
- Jimmy Jackson
- Gene Littler
- Sam Urzetta
- Ken Venturi
- Harvie Ward
- Jack Westland

=== Great Britain & Ireland ===
&
Playing captain: (Wales) Tony Duncan

- (Republic of Ireland) Joe Carr
- (Northern Ireland) Norman Drew
- (England) John Langley
- (Scotland) Roy MacGregor
- (England) Gerald Micklem
- (Wales) John Llewellyn Morgan
- (England) Arthur Perowne
- (England) Ronnie White
- (Scotland) James Wilson

== Friday's foursomes ==
&	Results
Carr/White	(United States) 6 & 4	Urzetta/Venturi
Langley/Perowne	(United States) 9 & 8	Ward/Westland
Wilson/MacGregor	(United States) 3 & 2	Jackson/Littler
Micklem/Morgan	(United Kingdom) (Republic of Ireland) 4 & 3	Campbell/Coe
1	Foursomes	3
1	Overall	3

== Saturday's singles ==
&	Results
Joe Carr	(United States) 4 & 3	Harvie Ward
Ronnie White	(United Kingdom) (Republic of Ireland) 1 up	Dick Chapman
Gerald Micklem	(United States) 5 & 3	Gene Littler
Roy MacGregor	(United States) 7 & 5	Jack Westland
Norman Drew	(United States) 9 & 7	Don Cherry
James Wilson	(United States) 9 & 8	Ken Venturi
John Llewellyn Morgan	(United Kingdom) (Republic of Ireland) 3 & 2	Charles Coe
John Langley	(United States) 3 & 2	Sam Urzetta
2	Singles	6
3	Overall	9
