= Al Swift =

American politician

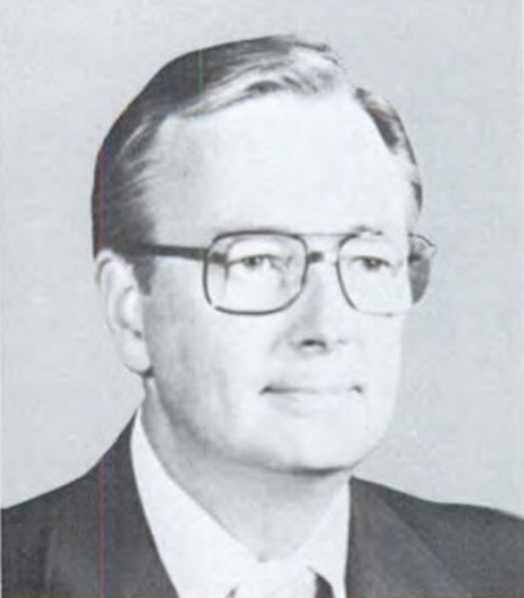

Member of the U.S. House of Representatives from Washington's 2nd district
- In office January 3, 1979 – January 3, 1995
- Preceded by: Lloyd Meeds
- Succeeded by: Jack Metcalf

Personal details
- Born: Allan Byron Swift; September 12, 1935 Tacoma, Washington, U.S.
- Died: April 20, 2018 (aged 82) Alexandria, Virginia, U.S.
- Party: Democratic
- Education: Central Washington University
- Al Swift's voice Al Swift addresses concerns with the National Voter Registration Act of 1993; Recorded June 16, 1992

Allan Byron Swift (September 12, 1935 – April 20, 2018) was an American Emmy award–winning broadcaster and politician who served as a member of the United States House of Representatives for eight terms from 1979 to 1995. He represented the second congressional district of Washington as a Democrat.

== Biography ==
Swift was born in Tacoma, Washington, in 1935. He studied for two years at Whitman College where he was a member of the Sigma Chi Chapter. He received a bachelor's degree from the Central Washington College of Education in 1957.

Prior to his sixteen years in Congress, Swift was a broadcaster in several stations throughout Washington State in the towns of Walla Walla (KUJ), Ellensburg (KXLE) and Bellingham (KVOS-TV). At KVOS, he was Director of News and Public Affairs, producing a series of weekly public interest programs and documentaries and earning an Emmy from the National Academy of Television Arts and Sciences.

=== Congress ===
He was first elected to the House in 1978, replacing the retiring Lloyd Meeds, for whom Swift had served as an administrative assistant from 1965 to 1969 and from 1977 to 1978. Swift won re-election in 1980, 1982, 1984, 1986, 1988, 1990, and 1992. Swift served on the powerful Energy and Commerce Committee, of which he was the 5th ranking member during his final term and chair of the subcommittee on Transportation and Hazardous Materials. He also chaired the Subcommittee on Elections of the House Administration Committee. Among his accomplishments was authorship of the Emergency Planning and Community Right-to-Know Act, which was designed to support emergency planning regarding Superfund sites. Swift also authored and led the passage of the National Voter Registration Act of 1993, otherwise known as motor-voter, which expanded voter registration options nationwide including drivers license offices and mail-in registration. He retired and did not run for re-election in 1994, an election in which the Democrats lost this seat.

=== Later career ===
Following his final term in Congress, Swift was Vice President of Governmental Affairs with Burlington Northern Railroad until its merger with Santa Fe Railroad in 1996 and had a new railroad siding south of Blaine, WA named after him (Swift) . He was later a principal with the Washington, D.C., political strategy firm Colling, Swift & Hynes and a regular member of the internet based radio talk show called Backroom Politics. He and his wife, Paula, had two daughters, Amy Swift Donovan and Lauri Swift, and resided in Alexandria, Virginia.

=== Death ===
Swift died on April 20, 2018, in Alexandria, Virginia.

== See also ==
- Washington's congressional delegations

U.S. House of Representatives
Preceded by Lloyd Meeds	Member of the U.S. House of Representatives from Washington's 2nd congressional district 1979–1995	Succeeded by Jack Metcalf
