= Americas Cup (golf) =

Tournament information
- Established: 1952
- Format: Team match play
- Final year: 1967

Final champion
- United States

The Americas Cup was a biennial men's team golf tournament between teams of amateurs golfers from the United States, Canada and Mexico. It was held nine times between 1952 and 1967. The United States won all the matches except in 1965 when Canada won the cup.

The matches followed on from an informal match that had been played in 1951 at Saucon Valley Country Club between teams from the United States and Canada. A trophy was donated by Jerome P. Bowes, Jr.

The event was held in even-numbered years from 1952 to 1960 when there was no Walker Cup match. However from 1961 to 1967 it was held in odd-numbered years, to avoid clashing with the Eisenhower Trophy which started in 1958 and was held in even-numbered years. The venue cycled between the United States, Canada and Mexico.

Until 1967 teams consisted of seven players, six of whom played in each session. In 1967 the teams were reduced to five with four playing in each session.

All nine events were held over two days. Matchplay threesomes were used in which each of the three played the other two simultaneously. Alternate-shot matches were played as well as single matches. In 1952 and 1954, 36-hole matches were played with extra holes played to obtain a result. There were three sets of alternate-shot matches on the first day and six sets of singles on the second day. From 1956, all matches were over 18 holes; extra holes were not played. Until 1967, there were three sets of alternate-shot matches and six sets of singles on both days. In 1967, there were only two sets of alternate-shot matches and four sets of singles each day.

== Results ==
Year	Dates	Venue	Winners	Points	Second	Points	Third	Points	Ref
1952	Aug 14–15	Seattle Golf Club	United States	12	Canada	10	Mexico	5	
1954	Aug 12–13	London Hunt and Golf Club	United States	14	Canada	13	Mexico	0	
1956	Oct 27–28	Club Campestre de la Ciudad de México	United States	29½	Mexico	13	Canada	11½	
1958	Sep 5–6	Olympic Country Club	United States	30	Canada	17	Mexico	7	
1960	Aug 11–12	Ottawa Hunt and Golf Club	United States	21½	Canada	20	Mexico	12½	
1961	Oct 21–22	Club Campestre Monterrey	United States	29	Canada	14	Mexico	11	
1963	Sep 5–6	Wakonda Club	United States	26½	Canada	19½	Mexico	8	
1965	Aug 6–7	St. Charles Country Club	Canada	22	United States	19½	Mexico	12½	
1967	Oct 7–8	Guadalahara Country Club	United States	14½	Canada	11½	Mexico	10	

== Appearances ==
The following are those who have played in at least one of the matches.

=== United States ===
- Don Allen 1965, 1967
- Rex Baxter 1958
- Deane Beman 1960, 1961, 1963
- Joe Campbell 1956
- William C. Campbell 1952, 1954, 1956, 1965, 1967
- Don Cherry 1954, 1960
- Charles Coe 1952, 1954, 1958, 1960, 1961, 1963
- Joe Conrad 1954, 1956
- Richard Davies 1963
- Bob Dickson 1967
- Dave Eichelberger 1965
- Joe Gagliardi 1952
- Robert W. Gardner 1961
- Vinny Giles 1967
- Downing Gray 1965, 1967
- Labron Harris Jr. 1963
- John Mark Hopkins 1965
- Bill Hyndman 1958, 1960, 1961
- John Konsek 1960
- Dale Morey 1954, 1965
- Jack Nicklaus 1960, 1961
- Billy Joe Patton 1954, 1956, 1958, 1963
- Hillman Robbins 1956, 1958
- Charlie Smith 1961
- Frank Stranahan 1952
- R. H. Sikes 1963
- Bud Taylor 1958, 1960
- Ed Tutwiler 1965
- Ed Updegraff 1963
- Sam Urzetta 1952
- Ken Venturi 1952, 1956
- Harvie Ward 1952, 1954, 1956, 1958
- Dudley Wysong 1961

=== Canada ===
- Keith Alexander 1960, 1961, 1963, 1965, 1967
- Doug Bajus 1956, 1958
- Gordon Ball 1958
- Phil Brownlee 1960
- Bruce Castator 1958
- Percy Clogg 1952
- Gary Cowan 1958, 1960, 1961, 1963, 1965, 1967
- Don Doe 1954
- Phil Farley 1952, 1954
- Bob Fleming 1954
- Ted Homenuik 1961
- Eric Hudson 1958
- John Johnston 1958, 1960, 1961, 1965, 1967
- Peter Kelly 1952
- Ben Kern 1967
- Jerry Kesselring 1952
- Bob Kidd 1956, 1958
- George Knudson 1956
- Joe Leblanc 1956
- Gordon Mackenzie 1956
- Jerry Magee 1956
- Bill Mawhinney 1952^
- Walter McElroy 1952, 1954
- Moe Norman 1954
- Bill Pidlaski 1963, 1965
- John Russell 1967
- Douglas Silverberg 1954, 1956, 1963, 1965
- Bert Ticehurst 1961, 1963, 1965
- Bill Wakeham 1963
- Nick Weslock 1952, 1954, 1960, 1961, 1963, 1965
- Ron Willey 1960
- Bob Wylie 1960, 1961

=== Mexico ===
- Hector Alvarez 1960, 1961, 1967
- Reynaldo Avila 1952
- Carlos Belmont 1952, 1954
- Luis Brauer 1963
- Percy Clifford 1952
- Alejandro Cumming 1952, 1954, 1956
- Juan Antonio Estrada 1954, 1956, 1958, 1960, 1961, 1963, 1965, 1967
- Enrique Farias 1958, 1961
- Fernando Garza 1960
- Fernando Gonzalez 1952
- Roberto Halpern 1960, 1961, 1965, 1967
- Tomás Lehmann 1956, 1960, 1961, 1963, 1965, 1967
- Ignacio Lopez 1956, 1958
- Fernando Mendez 1954, 1956, 1958
- Jorge Molinar 1965
- Roberto Morris 1952, 1954
- Jose Luis Ortega 1958, 1963
- Carlos Porraz 1952^, 1954
- Rafael Quiroz 1958, 1960, 1961, 1963
- Antonio Rivas 1954, 1956
- Armando Rivero 1956
- Agustin Silveyra 1963, 1965
- Mauricio Urdaneta 1958, 1960, 1961, 1963, 1965
- Ricardo Vega 1965

^ In the final team but did not play in any matches.
