= Bud Taylor (golfer) =

American golfer (1916–1991)

Personal information
- Full name: Frank Monroe Taylor Jr.
- Nationality: United States
- Born: June 16, 1916 Ontario, California
- Died: March 30, 1991 (aged 74) Hamilton, Montana

Career
- Sport: Golf
- Status: Amateur

Best results in major championships
- Masters Tournament: T13: 1957
- PGA Championship: DNP
- U.S. Open: T29: 1956
- The Open Championship: DNP

Frank Monroe "Bud" Taylor Jr. (June 16, 1916 – March 30, 1991) was an American amateur golfer. He played in the 1957, 1959 and 1961 Walker Cup matches.

== Golf career ==
Taylor represented the United States in the Walker Cup in 1957, 1959, and 1961, in the 1958 Eisenhower Trophy and also in the Americas Cup in 1958 and 1960. He won the California State Amateur Championship in successive years, 1954 and 1955. He played in the Masters five times, twice finishing in the top 20. He also played in the U.S. Open three times. In 1956 he was in the top 10 after two rounds but faded and finished tied for 29th place. Taylor reached the final of the U.S. Amateur in 1957, losing 5 & 4 to Hillman Robbins.

== Personal life ==
Taylor trained as a dentist at the University of Southern California and served in the U.S. Army during World War II. After the war he practiced dentistry in Pomona, California, and later in Palm Springs until retiring in 1985. In 1990 he moved with his second wife Jane to Victor, Montana. Both he and his wife were suffering from ill-health and on March 30, 1991, they committed suicide. A hose was connected from a car exhaust into the interior of the car and the couple died of carbon monoxide poisoning.

== Amateur wins ==
- 1954 California State Amateur Championship
- 1955 California State Amateur Championship

== Results in major championships ==
Tournament	1955	1956	1957	1958	1959	1960	1961
Masters Tournament			T13	CUT	CUT	T20	CUT
U.S. Open	CUT	T29	CUT				

Note: Taylor never played in The Open Championship or the PGA Championship.

Did not play

CUT = missed the half-way cut
"T" indicates a tie for a place

== U.S. national team appearances ==
- Walker Cup: 1957 (winners), 1959 (winners), 1961 (winners)
- Americas Cup: 1958 (winners), 1960 (winners)
- Eisenhower Trophy: 1958
