= Harvie Ward =

American golfer (1925–2004)

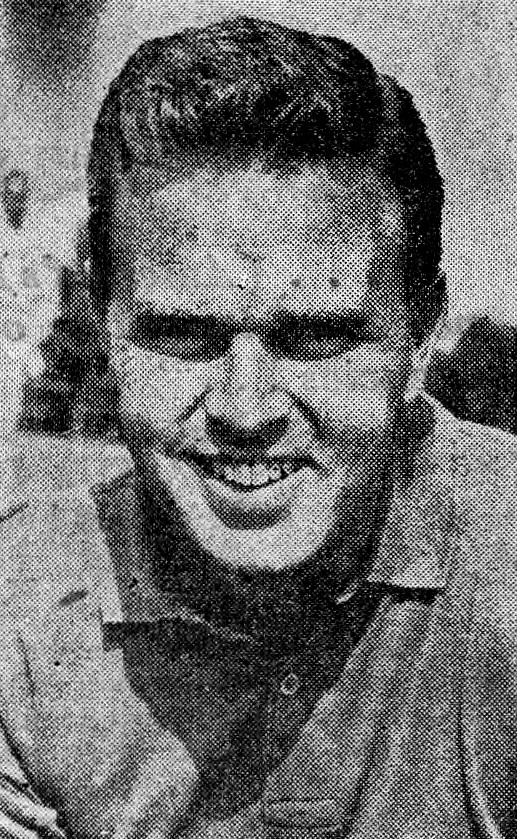
- Ward, circa 1955

Personal information
- Full name: Edward Harvie Ward, Jr.
- Nationality: United States
- Born: December 8, 1925 Tarboro, North Carolina, U.S.
- Died: September 4, 2004 (aged 78) Pinehurst, North Carolina, U.S.

Career
- Sport: Golf
- College: North Carolina
- Turned professional: 1974
- Former tour: Champions Tour

Best results in major championships (wins: 3)
- Masters Tournament: 4th: 1957
- PGA Championship: DNP
- U.S. Open: T7: 1955
- The Open Championship: DNP
- U.S. Amateur: Won: 1955, 1956
- British Amateur: Won: 1952

Edward Harvie Ward, Jr. (December 8, 1925 – September 4, 2004) was an American golfer best known for his amateur career. He is best known for winning both the U.S. Amateur (twice) and the British Amateur.

== Early life ==
Born in Tarboro, North Carolina, Ward attended the University of North Carolina in Chapel Hill. As a North Carolina Tar Heel, he won the NCAA individual championship in 1949, and graduated with a degree in economics.

== Amateur career ==
Ward's win in the British Amateur came in 1952 (he finished runner-up in 1953), and his consecutive U.S. Amateur wins came in 1955 and 1956. He also won several other significant amateur events including the Canadian Amateur, making him one of two golfers to win the U.S., British, and Canadian Amateurs (the other is Dick Chapman). Ward is the only player in history to have won those three titles along with the NCAA Championship. He finished runner-up in the 1952 Western Amateur.

Ward played on three winning Walker Cup teams (1953, 1955, 1959), winning all six of his matches.

In 1957, Ward lost his amateur status, in a controversial ruling by the United States Golf Association, for accepting expense money from sponsors for golf tournaments. The ruling was reversed in 1958. His primary sponsor, Eddie Lowery, who was serving at the time on the USGA's Executive Committee, had incorrectly claimed income tax deductions for the money he was spending to sponsor Ward, one of his car dealership employees in the San Francisco area. Ward was unaware of this situation, and was not personally at fault. Following the ruling, Ward's life went into a tailspin, and he took several years to recover.

Ward played in 19 professional majors. In 11 Masters Tournament appearances, he finished in the top 10 twice (4th in 1957 and tied for 8th in 1955), in the top 25 five times, and only missed two cuts. In the U.S. Open, he made the cut in five of eight appearances, including a tie for 7th in 1955.

== Professional career ==
In 1974, Ward turned professional. He became a club professional and golf instructor. His best-known student was three-time major winner Payne Stewart. He worked at Foxfire Country Club (Jackson Springs, North Carolina), Grand Cypress Golf Club (Orlando, Florida), Interlachen Golf Club (Winter Park, Florida), and Pine Needles Lodge & Golf Club (Southern Pines, North Carolina). He also won the 1977 North Carolina Open as a professional.

He played occasionally on the Senior PGA Tour from 1980 to 1990.

== Awards and honors ==
- In 1965, Ward was inducted into the North Carolina Sports Hall of Fame
- In 1981, Ward was inducted into the Carolinas Golf Reporters Association - Carolinas Golf Hall of Fame
- In 1996, Ward was inducted into the Carolinas PGA Hall of Fame

== Amateur wins ==
- 1948 North and South Amateur
- 1949 NCAA Championship, Carolinas Amateur, Tournament of Golf Champions
- 1952 British Amateur, Dogwood Invitational
- 1953 Dogwood Invitational
- 1954 Canadian Amateur
- 1955 U.S. Amateur, San Francisco City Championship
- 1956 U.S. Amateur

== Professional wins ==
- 1977 North Carolina Open

== Major championships ==
=== Amateur wins (3) ===
Year	Championship	Winning score	Runner-up
1952	British Amateur	6 & 5	(United States) Frank Stranahan
1955	U.S. Amateur	9 & 8	(United States) Bill Hyndman
1956	U.S. Amateur	5 & 4	(United States) Chuck Kocsis

=== Results timeline ===
Tournament	1947	1948	1949	1950	1951	1952	1953	1954	1955	1956	1957	1958	1959	1960	1961	1962	1963	1964	1965	1966
Masters Tournament		T51		T35	T35	T21	T14 LA	T20	T8 LA	T34	4 LA	CUT								CUT
U.S. Open					T39		CUT	CUT	T7 LA	47	T26	T37	CUT							
U.S. Amateur	QF	R128	R16	R128	R32	R32	R32	R64	1	1		R16	R16	R16	R64	R32				
British Amateur						1	2													

Note: Ward never played in The Open Championship or the PGA Championship.

Win
Top 10
Did not play

LA = low amateur
CUT = missed the half-way cut
R128, R64, R32, R16, QF, SF = round in which player lost in match play
"T" indicates a tie for a place

Sources: Masters, U.S. Open and U.S. Amateur

== U.S. national team appearances ==
Amateur

- Walker Cup: 1953 (winners), 1955 (winners), 1959 (winners)
- Americas Cup: 1952 (winners), 1954 (winners), 1956 (winners), 1958 (winners)
