= Henry Ransom =

American golfer (1911–1987)

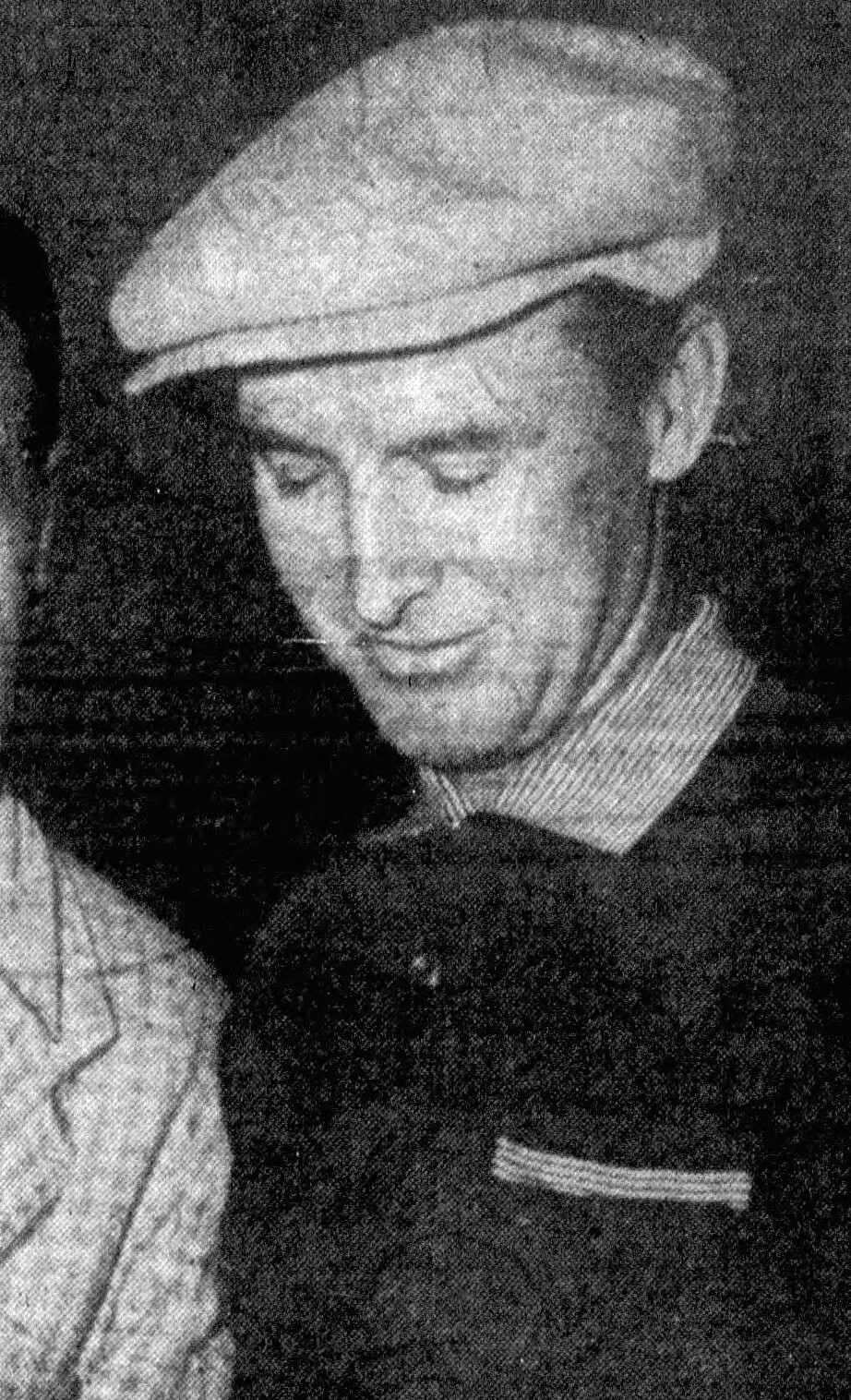
- Ransom in 1951

Personal information
- Full name: Henry B. Ransom
- Nationality: United States
- Born: February 25, 1911 Houston, Texas, U.S.
- Died: December 21, 1987 (aged 76)
- Height: 5 ft 10.25 in (1.78 m)
- Weight: 180 lb (82 kg; 13 st)

Career
- Sport: Golf
- Turned professional: 1933
- Former tour: PGA Tour
- Professional wins: 7

Number of wins by tour
- PGA Tour: 4
- Other: 3

Best results in major championships
- Masters Tournament: T21: 1957
- PGA Championship: T5: 1953, 1956
- U.S. Open: T5: 1950
- The Open Championship: DNP

Henry B. Ransom (February 25, 1911 – December 21, 1987) was an American professional golfer who played on the PGA Tour in the 1940s and 1950s.

== Early life ==
In 1911, Ransom was born in Houston, Texas.

== Professional career ==
In 1933, Ransom turned professional. He won five PGA Tour events during his career, and was a member of the 1951 Ryder Cup team. His best finishes in the major championships were a T-5 at the 1950 U.S. Open and at the 1953 and 1956 PGA Championships (lost in quarter-finals of match play).

At a tournament in Texas in 1948, Ransom was involved in a fist-fight with one of his playing partners, the diminutive, short-tempered Australian Norman Von Nida that resulted in police having to pull them apart.

Ransom was forced off the tour in the late 1950s because of an allergy to grass. After retiring as a tour player, he coached the Texas A&M University golf team from 1959 to 1973, winning six Southwest Conference titles. He was also a golf course architect; his designs included Idylwild Golf Club in Sour Lake, Texas.

== Professional wins ==
=== PGA Tour wins (4) ===
- 1946 St. Paul Open
- 1949 Wilmington Open
- 1950 World Championship of Golf
- 1955 Rubber City Open

=== Other wins ===
this list may be incomplete

- 1945 Long Island Open
- 1948 Illinois PGA Championship
- 1951 Inverness Invitational Four-Ball (with Roberto De Vicenzo)

== Results in major championships ==
| Tournament | 1938 | 1939 | 1940 | 1941 | 1942 | 1943 | 1944 | 1945 | 1946 | 1947 | 1948 | 1949 |
|---|---|---|---|---|---|---|---|---|---|---|---|---|
| Masters Tournament | | | | WD | | NT | NT | NT | | | | |
| U.S. Open | | CUT | T29 | T13 | NT | NT | NT | NT | T22 | T29 | | |
| PGA Championship | R64 | | | R64 | | NT | | | R32 | R32 | R16 | R32 |

| Tournament | 1950 | 1951 | 1952 | 1953 | 1954 | 1955 | 1956 | 1957 | 1958 | 1959 | 1960 | 1961 |
|---|---|---|---|---|---|---|---|---|---|---|---|---|
| Masters Tournament | WD | T25 | | | | | | T21 | CUT | | | |
| U.S. Open | T5 | T16 | CUT | | | | | CUT | CUT | T28 | T43 | CUT |
| PGA Championship | | R64 | R64 | QF | R32 | | QF | R16 | | | | |

Note: Ransom never played in The Open Championship.

Top 10
Did not play

NT = no tournament
WD = withdrew
CUT = missed the half-way cut
R64, R32, R16, QF, SF = round in which player lost in PGA Championship match play
"T" indicates a tie for a place

=== Summary ===
| Tournament | Wins | 2nd | 3rd | Top-5 | Top-10 | Top-25 | Events | Cuts made |
|---|---|---|---|---|---|---|---|---|
| Masters Tournament | 0 | 0 | 0 | 0 | 0 | 2 | 5 | 2 |
| U.S. Open | 0 | 0 | 0 | 1 | 1 | 4 | 13 | 8 |
| The Open Championship | 0 | 0 | 0 | 0 | 0 | 0 | 0 | 0 |
| PGA Championship | 0 | 0 | 0 | 2 | 4 | 8 | 12 | 12 |
| Totals | 0 | 0 | 0 | 3 | 5 | 14 | 30 | 22 |

- Most consecutive cuts made – 8 (1941 U.S. Open – 1949 PGA)
- Longest streak of top-10s – 1 (five times)
