= Pacific Northwest Golf Association =

- Abbreviation: PNGA
- Formation: February 4, 1899
- Type: Non-profit
- Location: Federal Way, Washington
- Website: thepnga.org

The Pacific Northwest Golf Association (PNGA) was established on February 4, 1899, and serves as a golf governing body that conducts championships and promotes golf activities to golfers located in the Pacific Northwest region of North America. The territory of the PNGA is divided into five different zones, made up of about 175,000 members and 650 golf courses.

== Championships ==
The PNGA conducts 16 championships for amateur golfers in the Pacific Northwest throughout the year.

- PNGA Cup
- Men's Master-40 Amateur Championship
- Senior Men's Amateur Championship
- Super Senior Men's Amateur Championship
- Men's Amateur Championship
- Women's Amateur Championship
- Women's Mid-Amateur Championship
- Junior Boys' Amateur Championship
- Junior Girls' Amateur Championship
- Men's Mid-Amateur Championship
- Women's Senior Team Championship
- Women's Super Senior Team Championship
- Men's Senior Team Championship
- Men's Super Senior Team Championship
- Senior Women's Amateur
- Super Senior Women's Amateur

== Allied associations ==
The PNGA works with six allied associations to help grow the game of golf in North America.

- United States Golf Association
- Golf Canada
- British Columbia Golf
- Idaho Golf Association
- Oregon Golf Association
- Washington State Golf Association

== Zone breakdown ==
The PNGA is broken down into five different zones which make up all of the 175,000 members and 650 golf courses.

1. Zone 1: Oregon
2. Zone 2: Eastern Washington
3. Zone 3: Western Washington and Alaska
4. Zone 4: British Columbia and Alberta
5. Zone 5: Idaho and Montana
