= Joe Conrad =

American golfer (1930–2018)

Personal information
- Full name: Joseph William Conrad
- Nationality: United States
- Born: March 14, 1930 San Antonio, Texas, U.S.
- Died: December 12, 2018 (aged 88) San Antonio, Texas, U.S.

Career
- Sport: Golf
- College: North Texas State
- Turned professional: 1956
- Former tour: PGA Tour

Best results in major championships
- Masters Tournament: T18: 1955
- PGA Championship: T44: 1964
- U.S. Open: CUT: 1952, 1953, 1954, 1959,1964
- The Open Championship: T22: 1955

Joseph William Conrad (March 14, 1930 – December 12, 2018) was an American professional golfer. He had a successful amateur career, playing in the 1955 Walker Cup and winning the 1955 Amateur Championship. He turned professional at the end of 1956 but had limited success as a tournament professional.

== Amateur career ==
Conrad had early successes as an amateur winning the Mexican Amateur in 1950 and the Texas Amateur in 1951. He attended North Texas State, playing in the team that won the NCAA Men's Golf Championship in 1950, 1951 and 1952. He had further successes, winning the Southern Amateur and Trans-Mississippi Amateur in 1953 and the Southern Amateur for a second time in 1954. He was selected for the Americas Cup team in 1954.

In January 1955, Conrad was selected for the Walker Cup team on the Old Course at St Andrews. He won his foursomes match but lost in the singles to David Blair by 1 hole, although the United States still won the match by 10 matches to 2. The Amateur Championship was played at Royal Lytham soon after the Walker Cup. Conrad met Alan Slater in the final. Conrad led by 4 holes after the first round but Slater reduced the deficit to 1 hole with 9 to play before Conrad won two holes to win 3 & 2. The following week he lost in the semi-final of the French Amateur championship to Henri de Lamaze. Conrad stayed on to play in the 1955 Open Championship on the Old Course. He qualified well, tying for 4th place, but in the Open itself he only just made the cut after a second round 76, one of three amateurs to make the cut. Rounds of 74 and 71 on the final day lifted him into a tie for 22nd place and he won the Silver Medal as the leading amateur.

In 1956 Conrad travelled to Troon, Scotland to defend his Amateur Championship title. He reached the quarter-finals before losing to Reid Jack by 1 hole. Later in the year he also made his second appearance in the Americas Cup.

== Professional career ==
Conrad turned professional at the end of 1956 and played on the PGA tour for two seasons. He had a top-20 finish in the 1957 Colonial National Invitation and played in the 1957 Masters Tournament. Conrad received an invitation for the 1957 Masters as an Amateur Championship winner but from 1958 winners of the U.S. Amateur and Amateur Championships no longer received invitations if they turned professional, unless they qualified in a different category.

== Amateur wins ==
- 1950 Mexican Amateur
- 1951 Texas Amateur
- 1953 Southern Amateur, Trans-Mississippi Amateur
- 1954 Southern Amateur
- 1955 Amateur Championship

== Results in major championships ==
Tournament	1952	1953	1954	1955	1956	1957	1958	1959	1960	1961	1962	1963	1964	1965	1966	1967	1968
Masters Tournament				T18	T61	CUT											
U.S. Open	CUT	CUT	CUT					CUT					CUT				
The Open Championship				T22LA													
PGA Championship													T44		64		CUT

Did not play

LA = Low amateur
CUT = missed the half-way cut
"T" indicates a tie for a place

== U.S. national team appearances ==
Amateur

- Walker Cup: 1955 (winners)
- Americas Cup: 1954 (winners), 1956 (winners)
