= Moe Norman =

Canadian professional golfer

Personal information
- Full name: Murray Irwin Norman
- Nickname: Moe
- Nationality: Canada
- Born: July 10, 1929 Kitchener, Ontario, Canada
- Died: September 4, 2004 (aged 75) Kitchener, Ontario, Canada

Career
- Sport: Golf
- Turned professional: 1957
- Former tour: Canadian Tour
- Professional wins: 55

Best results in major championships
- Masters Tournament: CUT: 1957
- PGA Championship: DNP
- U.S. Open: DNP
- The Open Championship: DNP

Achievements and awards
- Canadian Golf Hall of Fame: 1995
- Canada's Sports Hall of Fame: 2006

Murray Irwin "Moe" Norman (July 10, 1929 – September 4, 2004) was a Canadian professional golfer whose accuracy and ability to hit shot after shot perfectly straight gave him the reputation as a golf swing "genius" with the nicknames, "Pipeline Moe" and golf's savant "Rain Man". During his career, Norman won 65 Canadian Golf Tour tournaments and set 33 course records.

Ken Venturi claimed Norman was one of golf's "premier ball-strikers", and Tiger Woods said Norman and Ben Hogan were the only two golfers in history to have "owned their swings".

Over 1995 to 2006, Norman was inducted into the Canadian Golf Hall of Fame, the Ontario Sports Hall of Fame, and Canada's Sports Hall of Fame.

== Early life ==
Born in 1929 in Kitchener, Ontario, Canada, Norman developed his golf from childhood at the Rockway Golf Course, starting as a caddie in his preteen years. Norman's family discouraged him from playing golf, a factor that may have contributed to his growing solitary lifestyle, eccentricities, and exclusive focus to refining his golf skills. He developed his skills with extraordinary perseverance by hitting hundreds of practice balls per session until his hands bled, and by competing in numerous Ontario youth tournaments. Norman was self-taught and never took a golf lesson.

== Amateur career ==
Norman's first win was in 1949 – a one-day amateur event at the St. Thomas Golf and Country Club.

Norman won the Canadian Amateur Championship in 1955 and 1956. He played on the PGA Tour beginning in 1956 as an amateur, with two appearances by invitation as an amateur in the Masters Tournament.

== Professional career ==
In 1958, Norman turned professional, winning the Ontario Open in his first event, later entering 21 separate tournaments and winning 17. Over his career, he shot 59 three times and made 17 holes in one.

He played briefly on the PGA Tour, but due to shyness and bullying he encountered from certain pros, and a preference to stay in Canada, he played primarily in Ontario rather than travel to the United States. During tournament rounds, Norman would chat with spectators, and even take bets from the gallery about whether he could bounce a ball off the face of his driver more than 100 times, or whether he could hit a ball into a shirt pocket.

After finishing fourth in the 1959 Greater New Orleans Open tournament, PGA officials and other players gave Norman a dressing down for his eccentric behavior during the tournament, refusal to use a caddie, and wearing shoddy clothes. Feeling disappointed by the PGA's attitude, Norman vowed not to return to competition in the United States, deciding to play only in Canada where the purses were much lower.

Norman spent most of his playing career living in poverty. He lived above a bar and in a Kitchener motel, slept many nights during tournaments in his car or in sand traps on the golf courses, kept his belongings in his car, and spent winters setting pins in a bowling alley for low pay.

Norman's rapid playing style, along with his odd choice of clothes, were unconventional – he wore long-sleeved shirts in any weather, buttoned to his chin, and his pants did not fit well. He devised what is known as the "single plane golf swing", involving rigid arms extended far from his body, a wide stance with minimal knee bend, shorter-than-usual backswing, and an extended upward follow-through with minimal hand action, producing highly accurate ball placement. Playing extremely fast, he sometimes did not bother to take a practice swing or line up his putts. Norman had an outstanding memory for numbers, and was able to recite the exact hole yardages for 375 of the 434 courses he played over his career, giving him further reputation as golf's "Rain Man".

Norman was known for his unconventional playing strategy. It is said that on one hole his caddie told him he could get to the green with a driver and a 9-iron. Confidently, he used a 9-iron off the tee, and then landed his ball on the green using his driver.

While playing in a 1960 exhibition match with his hero, Sam Snead, rather than lay up short of a creek hazard, which Snead said could not be carried, Norman purposely hit his drive onto the bridge, with the ball crossing the creek safely, bouncing toward the green.

Overall, Norman won 65 career Canadian Tour and other Canadian event victories. He was the Canadian PGA champion in 1966 and 1974, and won the Canadian Seniors PGA Championship seven consecutive times starting in 1979, tying for fifth in the next championship, and winning the following championship by eight strokes.

Later in his career, Norman found better financial security when Natural Golf, an instruction company, sponsored his demonstrations for a few hundred dollars per event, often performing exhibitions across Canada.

In 1995, Acushnet, the manufacturer of Titleist golf equipment and balls, signed him to a lifetime contract for $5,000 per month after he allegedly told a reporter, "Titleist never did nothing for me." Wally Uihlein, president of Acushnet and Titleist, considered the stipend as a loyalty reward for Norman using only Titleist golf balls for 40 years.

== Death ==
In September 2004, Norman died in a Kitchener hospital from congestive heart failure, having suffered from the condition since heart bypass surgery six years earlier. He also had a heart attack two years before his death. A Titleist driver was placed in Norman's coffin.

Found in the trunk of his car after his death were more than 1,000 loose golf balls, most of them Titleist Pro V1s, 10 pairs of golf shoes, various irons, and $20,000 in cash hidden throughout the car, as Norman disliked using banks.

== Legacy ==
Periodically over decades, Golf Digest conducted analyses of Moe Norman's golf swing, featuring him on the cover in 1995.

A 2021 report indicated that Wayne Gretzky was producing a film about Norman, who was commonly described as the "greatest ball striker who ever lived." Ken Venturi stated: "Because Moe is kind of eccentric, he never got the credit he deserved or played the kind of golf he was capable of. You had to ignore the way he looked over the ball and judge his ball-striking. Hogan, Snead, Nelson — they all look esthetic. Moe looked very awkward. But he could do anything. He is one of the premier ball-strikers I have ever seen." Lee Trevino said: "When you talk about Moe Norman, you're talking about a legend. I think the guy's a genius."

Vijay Singh called Norman "God's gift to golf." Gary Player stated in 2015 that he "loved his method of play, his teaching, which... was absolutely magnificent... He knew a lot about the game, he was a very good player." In January 2005, Tiger Woods told Golf Digest's Jaime Diaz that only two golfers in history "owned their swings": Moe Norman and Ben Hogan.

== Awards and honors ==
- In 1995, he was inducted into the Canadian Golf Hall of Fame.
- In 1999, he was inducted into the Ontario Sports Hall of Fame.
- In 2006, he was inducted into Canada's Sports Hall of Fame.

== In popular culture ==
- Norman's golf achievements and eccentric personality inspired many articles and biographic books including The Feeling of Greatness – The Moe Norman Story, by Tim O'Connor (ISBN 1-57028-086-X), The Single Plane Golf Swing, Play Better Golf the Moe Norman Way by Todd Graves with Tim O'Connor (ISBN 978-1-61254-192-1), Moe Norman: The Canadian Golfing Legend with the Perfect Swing, by Stan Sauerwein (ISBN 978-1-55153-953-9), Moe and Me: Encounters with Moe Norman, Golf's Mysterious Genius by Lorne Rubinstein, (ISBN 1-77041-053-8), Finish To The Sky, by Greg Lavern (ISBN 978-0994886118) and Send In The Clown by Andrew Stelmack. (ISBN 978-1778225215)
- A documentary film about Norman's life, The Feeling of Greatness, was in production, and scheduled for completion in December 2018.
- A film, Dance the Green was in production as of 1999. Wayne Gretzky was one of the investors.
- A film, The Place I Belong: The Moe Norman Story, produced by David Carver, was scheduled to start production in 2024.

== Amateur wins ==
- 1955 Canadian Amateur
- 1956 Canadian Amateur

== Professional wins ==
this list is incomplete

- 1966 Canadian PGA Championship
- 1974 Canadian PGA Championship
- 1979 Canadian PGA Seniors Championship
- 1980 Canadian PGA Seniors Championship
- 1981 Canadian PGA Seniors Championship
- 1982 Canadian PGA Seniors' Championship
- 1983 Canadian PGA Seniors' Championship
- 1984 Canadian PGA Seniors' Championship
- 1985 Canadian PGA Seniors' Championship
- 1987 Canadian PGA Seniors' Championship

== Results in major championships ==
Tournament	1956	1957
Masters Tournament	WD	CUT

== Team appearances ==
- Americas Cup (representing Canada): 1954
- World Cup (representing Canada): 1971
