= 1955 Walker Cup =

Golf tournament

15th Walker Cup Match
- Dates: 20–21 May 1955
- Venue: Old Course at St Andrews
- Location: St Andrews, Scotland
- Captains: Alec Hill (GB&I); William C. Campbell (USA)
(United Kingdom) (Republic of Ireland)	2	10	(United States)
- United States wins the Walker Cup

The 1955 Walker Cup, the 15th Walker Cup Match, was played on 20 and 21 May 1955, on the Old Course at St Andrews, Scotland. The United States won by 10 matches to 2.

The United States won all four of the foursomes matches on the first day. Great Britain and Ireland won just two of the singles matches on the second day, both at the final hole, to give the United States a convincing victory. William C. Campbell, the United States playing captain, did not select himself for any of the matches.

== Format ==
Four 36-hole matches of foursomes were played on Friday and eight singles matches on Saturday. Each of the 12 matches was worth one point in the larger team competition. If a match was all square after the 36th hole extra holes were not played. The team with most points won the competition. If the two teams were tied, the previous winner would retain the trophy.

== Teams ==
Great Britain & Ireland had a team of 10 plus a non-playing captain. The United States only selected a team of 9, which included a playing captain.

=== Great Britain & Ireland ===
&
Captain: (England) Alec Hill

- (Scotland) David Blair
- (England) Ian Caldwell
- (Republic of Ireland) Joe Carr
- (Scotland) Robin Cater
- (Republic of Ireland) Cecil Ewing
- (England) Gerald Micklem
- (England) Bunny Millward
- (Wales) John Llewellyn Morgan
- (England) Philip Scrutton
- (England) Ronnie White

=== United States ===
Playing captain: William C. Campbell

- Don Cherry
- Joe Conrad
- Bruce Cudd
- Jimmy Jackson
- Dale Morey
- Billy Joe Patton
- Harvie Ward
- Dick Yost

== Friday's foursomes ==
&	Results
Carr/White	(United States) 1 up	Ward/Cherry
Micklem/Morgan	(United States) 2 & 1	Patton/Yost
Caldwell/Millward	(United States) 3 & 2	Conrad/Morey
Blair/Cater	(United States) 5 & 4	Cudd/Jackson
0	Foursomes	4
0	Overall	4

== Saturday's singles ==
&	Results
Ronnie White	(United States) 6 & 5	Harvie Ward
Philip Scrutton	(United States) 2 & 1	Billy Joe Patton
Ian Caldwell	(United Kingdom) (Republic of Ireland) 1 up	Dale Morey
Joe Carr	(United States) 5 & 4	Don Cherry
David Blair	(United Kingdom) (Republic of Ireland) 1 up	Joe Conrad
Bunny Millward	(United States) 2 up	Bruce Cudd
Cecil Ewing	(United States) 6 & 4	Jimmy Jackson
John Llewellyn Morgan	(United States) 8 & 7	Dick Yost
2	Singles	6
2	Overall	10
