= Dick Yost =

American golfer (1929–1973)

Personal information
- Full name: Richard Lewis Yost
- Nationality: United States
- Born: December 27, 1929 Portland, Oregon, U.S.
- Died: August 3, 1973 (aged 43) Portland, Oregon, U.S.

Career
- Sport: Golf
- College: Oregon State University
- Status: Amateur

Best results in major championships
- Masters Tournament: CUT: 1957
- PGA Championship: DNP
- U.S. Open: DNP
- The Open Championship: DNP

Richard Lewis Yost (December 27, 1929 – August 3, 1973) was an American amateur golfer. He played in the 1955 Walker Cup match.

== Golf career ==
Yost attended Oregon State University from 1948 to 1951, winning the 1950 Oregon Amateur title during his time there. He won the Pacific Northwest Amateur in 1953 and was selected for the 1955 Walker Cup on the Old Course at St Andrews. The United States won by 10 matches to 2 with Yost winning both of his matches. After his return he won the 1955 Pacific Northwest Amateur and in 1958 he won the Oregon Open. Yost played just once in the Masters, in 1957 when he missed the cut.

Yost was inducted to the Oregon Sports Hall of Fame in 1982, the Oregon State Athletics Hall of Fame in 1990 and the Pacific Northwest Golf Association Hall of Fame in 1991.

== Amateur wins ==
- 1950 Oregon Amateur
- 1953 Pacific Northwest Amateur
- 1955 Pacific Northwest Amateur
- 1958 Oregon Open

== U.S. national team appearances ==
- Walker Cup: 1955 (winners)
