= Rex Baxter =

American professional golfer (1936–2024)

Personal information
- Full name: Rex Bernice Baxter Jr.
- Nationality: United States
- Born: February 28, 1936 Amarillo, Texas, U.S.
- Died: August 1, 2024 (aged 88) Pompano Beach, Florida, U.S.

Career
- Sport: Golf
- College: University of Houston
- Status: Professional
- Former tours: PGA Tour; Champions Tour
- Professional wins: 4

Number of wins by tour
- PGA Tour: 1
- Other: 3

Best results in major championships
- Masters Tournament: 34th: 1957
- PGA Championship: T68: 1972
- U.S. Open: T40: 1965
- The Open Championship: DNP

Rex Bernice Baxter Jr. (February 28, 1936 – August 1, 2024) was an American professional golfer who played on the PGA Tour and Senior PGA Tour.

== Early life and amateur career ==
Baxter is a native of Amarillo, Texas. Baxter won the U.S. Junior Amateur at Tulsa's Southern Hills Country Club in 1953. He attended the University of Houston, where he was an All-American member of the golf team and individually the 1957 NCAA national champion.

== Professional career ==
Baxter won the 1963 Cajun Classic Open Invitational. He also won the 1970 PGA Professional National Championship. His best finish in a major is T-33 at the 1960 U.S. Open.

Late in his career, Baxter worked as a club pro at various clubs including Beechmont Country Club in Cleveland, Ohio, Glen Oaks Country Club on Long Island, and High Ridge in Lantana, Florida. He was also an instructor at Ballen Isles Country Club in Palm Beach Gardens and for Golf Digest Schools at PGA National in Palm Beach Gardens, Florida thereafter.

== Personal life ==
Baxter died on August 1, 2024 at the age of 88.

== Awards and honors ==
Baxter was inducted into the University of Houston Athletics Hall of Honor in 1971; he was the first member of the golf team to receive this honor.

== Amateur wins (5) ==
- 1953 U.S. Junior Amateur Golf Championship
- 1956 Missouri Valley Conference tournament (individual medalist)
- 1957 Missouri Valley Conference tournament (individual medalist), NCAA Championship, Trans-Mississippi Amateur

== Professional wins (4) ==
=== PGA Tour wins (1) ===
No.	Date	Tournament	Winning score	Margin of victory	Runner-up
1	Nov 24, 1963	Cajun Classic Open Invitational	−9 (68-71-68-68=275)	2 strokes	(United States) Bob Shave Jr.

=== Other wins (3) ===
- 1965 Waterloo Open Golf Classic
- 1966 Brazil Open
- 1970 PGA Professional National Championship

== U.S. national team appearances ==
Amateur

- Walker Cup: 1957 (winners)
- Americas Cup: 1958 (winners)

Professional

- Diamondhead Cup/PGA Cup: 1974 (winners), 1976 (winners)
