= Billy Joe Patton =

American amateur golfer (1922–2011)

Personal information
- Full name: William Joseph Patton
- Nationality: United States
- Born: April 19, 1922 Morganton, North Carolina, U.S.
- Died: January 1, 2011 (aged 88) Morganton, North Carolina, U.S.

Career
- Sport: Golf
- Status: Amateur
- Professional wins: 2

Best results in major championships
- Masters Tournament: 3rd: 1954
- PGA Championship: DNP
- U.S. Open: T6: 1954
- The Open Championship: DNP
- U.S. Amateur: T3: 1962
- British Amateur: T5: 1955

Achievements and awards
- Bob Jones Award: 1982

William Joseph Patton (April 19, 1922 – January 1, 2011) was an American golfer best known for almost winning the 1954 Masters Tournament.

== Early life and amateur career ==
Patton was born in Morganton, North Carolina in 1922. He graduated from Wake Forest University in 1943.

== Professional career ==
In the 1954 Masters Tournament at Augusta National Golf Club, Patton came within one stroke of being in a three-man playoff with Ben Hogan and Sam Snead. His final round 71 included a hole-in-one on the par-3 6th hole and a double bogey on the par-5 13th hole, when he tried to reach the green in two and put his ball into Rae's Creek.

Patton won several amateur tournaments including the North and South Amateur three times and the Southern Amateur twice. He also won the Carolinas Open twice.

Patton played on five Walker Cup teams: in 1955, 1957, 1959, 1963, and 1965 and was captain of the 1969 team. He played on the Eisenhower Trophy team in 1958 and 1962.

== Tournament wins ==
- 1947 Carolinas Amateur
- 1951 Carolinas Open
- 1952 Carolinas Open (tied with Bobby Locke)
- 1954 North and South Amateur
- 1958 Carolinas Amateur
- 1961 Southern Amateur, Azalea Invitational, Carolinas Amateur
- 1962 North and South Amateur
- 1963 North and South Amateur
- 1964 North Carolina Amateur
- 1965 Southern Amateur
- 1979 Carolinas Senior Amateur
- 1981 Carolinas Senior Amateur

== Awards and honors ==
- In 1967, Patton was inducted into the North Carolina Sports Hall of Fame.
- In 1974, he was inducted into the Wake Forest University's Sports Hall of Fame.
- In 1975, Patton earned entry into the Southern Golf Association Hall of Fame.
- In 1981, the Carolinas Golf Reporters' Association inducted him into the Carolinas Golf Hall of Fame.
- In 1982, Patton was awarded the Bob Jones Award by the United States Golf Association.
- In 2007, he was inducted into the Burke County Sports Hall of Fame.

== Results in major championships ==
Tournament	1949	1950	1951	1952	1953	1954	1955	1956	1957	1958	1959
Masters Tournament						3 LA	T49	T12	CUT	8 LA	T8
U.S. Open		CUT		T36	T54	T6 LA		13	T8 LA	CUT	
U.S. Amateur	R64		R32	R64		R64	R256	R32	R128	R64	R32
The Amateur Championship							QF				R128

Tournament	1960	1961	1962	1963	1964	1965	1966	1967	1968	1969	1970	1971	1972
Masters Tournament	T13 LA	CUT	CUT	48	T37	CUT	CUT						
U.S. Open			CUT		CUT								
U.S. Amateur	R64	R32	SF	R64	R16	T19	T26		T8	CUT			T23
The Amateur Championship				R256									

Top 10
Did not play

LA = low amateur
CUT = missed the half-way cut
"T" indicates a tie for a place
R256, R128, R64, R32, R16, QF, SF = Round in which player lost in match play

Sources: Masters, U.S. Open, U.S. Amateur, British Amateur: 1955, 1959

== U.S. national team appearances ==
- Walker Cup: 1955 (winners), 1957 (winners), 1959 (winners), 1963 (winners), 1965 (tied, cup retained), 1969 (non-playing captain, winners)
- Eisenhower Trophy: 1958, 1962 (winners)
- Americas Cup: 1954 (winners), 1956 (winners), 1958 (winners), 1963 (winners)
