= Dale Morey =

American basketball player and golfer

- Morey in 1939

Personal information
- Born: December 1, 1918 Martinsville, Indiana, U.S.
- Died: May 14, 2002 (aged 83) High Point, North Carolina, U.S.

Career information
- High school: Martinsville (Martinsville, Indiana)
- College: LSU (1939–1942)
- Playing career: 1946–1947
- Position: Forward

Career history

Playing
- 1946–1947: Anderson Packers
- 1947: Louisville Colonels

Coaching
- 1942–1944: LSU

Dale E. Morey (December 1, 1918 – May 14, 2002) was an American amateur golfer and professional basketball player. In basketball, he played in the National Basketball League for the Anderson Duffey Packers during the 1946–47 season. In golf, he won 261 tournaments and made nine holes-in-one in his career.

== Basketball career ==
Morey played college basketball at Louisiana State University (LSU) between 1939 and 1942. Morey then took over as head coach of the team after graduating in 1942 because then-head coach Harry Rabenhorst was called into military service during World War II. He posted a 28–19 overall record in his two seasons as LSU coach. Several years later, Morey played professionally. In 1946–47 he suited up for the Anderson Duffey Packers in the National Basketball League, and in 1947–48 he played for the Louisville Colonels in the Professional Basketball League of America.

== Golf career ==
Morey had a long amateur golf career. He turned professional for a time, but later had his amateur status reinstated. He played college golf at LSU where he was a three-time All-American and helped the LSU team to NCAA titles in 1940 and 1942. He won several top amateur events: the Southern Amateur in 1950 and 1964, the Western Amateur in 1953, the Azalea Invitational in 1960, the North and South Amateur in 1964, the Mexican Amateur in 1968, and the Mid-Atlantic Amateur in 1972. Morey finished runner-up to Gene Littler in the 1953 U.S. Amateur, held at the Oklahoma City Golf & Country Club, losing on the final hole. Morey courageously rallied by winning the 16th and 17th holes with successive birdies to tie the match, however he found a greenside bunker at the 18th hole and blasted out 15 feet from the pin. Littler sank a 20-foot birdie putt to win.

He played on the winning Walker Cup teams in 1955 and 1965, the Americas Cup team in 1954 and 1965, and the Eisenhower Trophy team in 1964. Morey also won many state titles against both amateurs and professionals: Indiana Amateur (four times), Indiana Open (four times), North Carolina Amateur (twice), and North Carolina Open (once). His amateur career extended into senior years, winning the U.S. Senior Amateur twice, 1974 and 1978, and finishing runner-up in 1981. He also won the U.S. Senior Golf Association Championship three times, the American Seniors five times, as well as the International Seniors and the British Senior Amateur. He also held executive positions in several golf associations including the Indiana Golf Association, Carolinas Golf Association, and Southern Golf Association.

== Awards and honors ==
- Morey has been inducted into the Indiana High School Golf Hall of Fame and the Indiana Sports Hall of Fame.
- In 1966, he was inducted into the Indiana Golf Hall of Fame.
- Morey was a Golf Digest Senior Amateur of the Year six times: 1974, 1977, 1978, 1979, 1982, and 1983.
- In 1979, he was inducted into the Southern Golf Association Hall of Fame
- Morey earned Golf Digest's Outstanding Senior Amateur of Decade for the 1970s.
- In 1980, Morey was inducted into the North Carolina Sports Hall of Fame.
- In 1982, he was inducted into the North Carolina Golf Hall of Fame.
- In 1995, Morey was honored as the American Seniors Golf Association Distinguished Senior
- Morey was inducted into the North Carolina Sportswriters Hall of Fame over the course of his life.

== Tournament wins ==
- 1936 Indiana Junior
- 1943 All-American Amateur, Indiana Amateur
- 1944 Indiana Amateur
- 1950 Southern Amateur
- 1951 Indiana Amateur, Indiana Open, Greenwood Open
- 1953 Indiana Amateur, Indiana Open, Western Amateur, Westborough Round Robin
- 1957 Indiana Open
- 1959 Indiana Open
- 1960 Azalea Invitational
- 1964 Southern Amateur, North and South Amateur
- 1966 International Men's Four-Ball Championship
- 1967 North Carolina Open, Carolinas Amateur
- 1968 Mexican Amateur, North Carolina Amateur
- 1969 North Carolina Amateur, Carolinas Golf Association Senior
- 1970 International Men's Four-Ball Championship
- 1971 American Amateur Classic
- 1972 Mid-Atlantic Amateur
- 1974 U.S. Senior Amateur
- 1975 U.S. Senior Golf Association Championship, American Seniors
- 1976 U.S. Senior Golf Association Championship, Southern Senior
- 1977 U.S. Senior Golf Association Championship, U.S. Senior Amateur, American Seniors, International Seniors
- 1979 American Seniors, North and South Senior Amateur
- 1980 North and South Senior Amateur
- 1981 American Seniors
- 1982 American Seniors, Carolinas PGA Senior, Wild Dunes Seniors
- 1983 American Seniors, Wild Dunes Seniors
- 1984 Carolinas Senior
- 1985 British Senior Amateur

== U.S. national team appearances ==
- Americas Cup: 1954 (winners), 1965
- Walker Cup: 1955 (winners), 1965 (tied, cup retained)
- Eisenhower Trophy: 1964
