= Don Cherry (singer) =

American singer and golfer (1924–2018)

- Birth name: Donald Ross Cherry
- Born: January 11, 1924 Wichita Falls, Texas, U.S.
- Died: April 4, 2018 (aged 94) Las Vegas, Nevada, U.S.
- Genres: Big band; traditional pop
- Years active: 1951–1960s
- Labels: Decca; Columbia

Donald Ross Cherry (January 11, 1924 – April 4, 2018) was an American traditional pop and big band singer and golfer. In music, he is best known for his 1955 hit "Band of Gold".

== Biography ==
Cherry was born in Wichita Falls, Texas. He started in his early 20s as a big band singer in the orchestras of Jan Garber and Victor Young. During World War II, he served in the U.S. Army Air Forces. In 1951, he recorded his first solo hits, "Thinking of You" and "Belle, Belle, My Liberty Belle". In 1955, came his biggest hit, "Band of Gold", which reached No. 4 on the Billboard chart. It sold over one million copies, and was awarded a gold disc. The track peaked at No. 6 in the UK Singles Chart. He had three more hits in 1956: "Wild Cherry", "Ghost Town", and "Namely You", all backed by orchestra leader Ray Conniff. He was also the voice of the Mr. Clean commercials during the late 1950s and early 1960s. In 1962, he also recorded the original version of "Then You Can Tell Me Goodbye", which became a hit much later for The Casinos and others.

Throughout his singing career, Cherry was also a top-ranked amateur golfer, and was in contention to win the 1960 U.S. Open before eventually finishing tied for ninth along with Ben Hogan, four strokes behind winner Arnold Palmer. Cherry played on three Walker Cup teams (1953, 1955, and 1961), in the Americas Cup twice (1954 and 1960) and in nine Masters Tournaments, making the cut seven times with a best finish of T-25 in 1959. He captured the Canadian Amateur Championship in 1953 and the prestigious Sunnehanna Amateur title in 1954. In 1962, Cherry decided to turn professional and "Pro" became his nickname among fellow entertainers. His volcanic temper on the golf course (which, according to Cherry, "...made Tommy Bolt look like a choir boy!") was in startling contrast to his velvety-smooth singing voice and pleasant stage persona.

Cherry published his biography, Cherry's Jubilee, with co-writer Neil Daniels. He was a good friend of Willie Nelson, and had collaborated on three albums with him, Augusta (1995), The Eyes of Texas (2002), and It's Magic (2007). Cherry was married four times, once to 1956 Miss America Sharon Ritchie, before wedding Francine Bond Smith, in 1993. They lived in Las Vegas, Nevada. His son, Stephen, was a casualty of the 9/11 attacks when American Airlines Flight 11 crashed into the North Tower. Stephen left behind four sons.

He was also married to Miss Nevada, Joy Garner and singer, Dean Martin was the best man at their wedding. Miss Garner was also a Copa showgirl at the Sands Hotel.

Cherry died at a hospice on April 4, 2018, at the age of 94. He is survived by his wife, Francine.

== Singles ==
Year	Title	Chart positions
Year	Title	US
1950	"Mona Lisa" (with Victor Young)	7
1950	"The 3rd Man Theme" (with Victor Young)	22
1950	"Thinking of You"	4
1951	"Vanity"	11
1951	"Belle, Belle, My Liberty Belle" (with Sonny Burke)	25
1955	"Band of Gold"^{A}" (with Ray Conniff)	4
1956	"Wild Cherry" (with Ray Conniff)	29
1956	"I'm Still a King to You" (with Ray Conniff)	72
1956	"Ghost Town" (with Ray Conniff)	22
1956	"I'll Be Around" (with Ray Conniff)	78
1956	"Namely You" (with Ray Conniff)	65
1956	"Give me More" (with Ray Conniff)	—
1966	"Married"^{B}	—
1966	"I Love You Drops"	112
1967	"There Goes My Everything"	113
1968	"Take a Message to Mary"^{C}	—

- ^{A}"Band of Gold" also peaked at No. 6 in UK Singles Chart.
- ^{B}"Married" also peaked at No. 30 in Adult Contemporary singles.
- ^{C}"Take a Message to Mary" also peaked at No. 71 in Billboard country chart

== Sources ==
- Cherry, Don; Daniels, Neil (2006). Cherry's Jubilee: Singin' and Swingin' Through Life with Dino and Frank, Arnie and Jack. Triumph Books. ISBN 978-1-57243-834-7.
