= Hillman Robbins =

American professional golfer

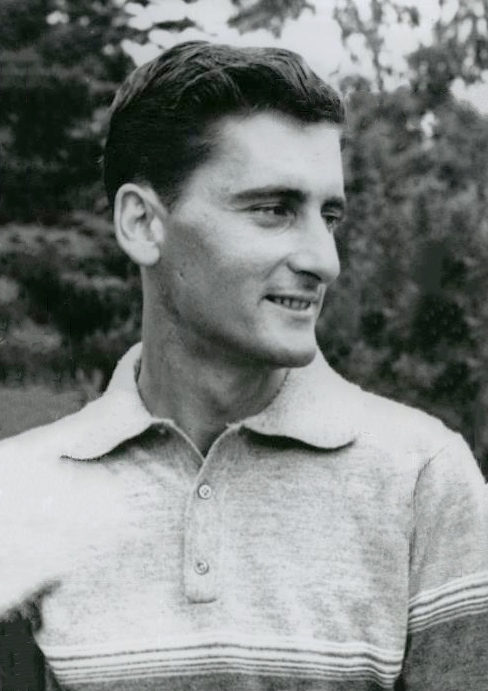
- Robbins in 1958

Personal information
- Full name: Clarence Hillman Robbins Jr.
- Nationality: United States
- Born: April 22, 1932 Memphis, Tennessee, U.S.
- Died: November 6, 1981 (aged 49)

Career
- Sport: Golf
- College: Memphis State College
- Turned professional: 1958

Best results in major championships
- Masters Tournament: T17: 1956
- PGA Championship: DNP
- U.S. Open: CUT: 1952, 1953, 1959
- The Open Championship: DNP

Clarence Hillman Robbins Jr. (April 22, 1932 – November 6, 1981) was an American professional golfer who is best known for his amateur career, including winning the 1957 U.S. Amateur.

== Early life ==
Robbins was born in Memphis, Tennessee. He was the son of Hillman Robbins Sr., a clerk at the Square-D liquor store, also located in Memphis, who was shot to death by paranoid lawyer Glenn Nash on December 6, 1966.

== Amateur career ==
He played college golf at Memphis State College where he won the NCAA Championship in 1954. In 1957, while on leave from duty in the Air Force, he won the U.S. Amateur at The Country Club in Brookline, Massachusetts, beating Bud Taylor, 5 & 4. He won several other amateur tournaments and played on the 1957 Walker Cup team.

== Professional career ==
Robbins turned professional in 1958 but did not enjoy as much success as he had as an amateur. He served as the club professional at Galloway Golf Course in Memphis from 1966 until his death in 1981.

Robbins was inducted into the Tennessee Golf Hall of Fame in 1995.

== Tournament wins ==
- 1951 Western Junior
- 1953 Tennessee State Amateur, Southeastern Open
- 1954 Southern Intercollegiate, NCAA Championship, Arkansas Open
- 1955 Sunnehanna Amateur, Southeastern Open
- 1956 North and South Amateur, Air Force Championship
- 1957 U.S. Amateur, All-Services Tournament

== U.S. national team appearances ==
Amateur

- Walker Cup: 1957 (winners)
- Americas Cup: 1956 (winners), 1958 (winners)
