= Martha Burk =

American feminist

- Born: October 18, 1941 (age 84)
- Occupations: Political psychologist, feminist
- Spouse: Ralph Estes

Martha Gertrude Burk (born October 18, 1941) is an American political psychologist, feminist, and former (2000-2005) Chair of the National Council of Women's Organizations.

== Career ==
In 1992, Burk became an associate of the Women's Institute for Freedom of the Press (WIFP). She authored Cult of Power: Sex Discrimination in Corporate America and What Can Be Done About It, published by Scribner in 2005, and more recently Your Money and Your Life: The High Stakes for Women Voters in '08 and Beyond (2008), followed by five editions (2012-2020) of Your Voice, Your Vote: The Savvy Woman's Guide to Power, Politics, and the Change We Need.

Burk served as Senior Policy Advisor for Women's Issues to New Mexico Governor Bill Richardson from 2007-2010, when he left office due to term limitations. As part of her service under Richardson, she designed and instituted a first in the nation state gender pay equity initiative, which requires state contractors to submit gender pay equity statistics as a condition of bidding.

Burk currently runs the Corporate Accountability Project for the National Council of Women's Organizations, which started the Women on Wall Street project to investigate sex discrimination at companies associated with Augusta National. She is a syndicated columnist, and serves as Money Editor for Ms. She also is producer/host of Equal Time With Martha Burk on Santa Fe Public Radio, and sits on the editorial board of the Journal of Women, Politics & Policy.

== Controversy with Augusta National Golf Club ==
Burk is widely known for a disagreement beginning in 2002 with William "Hootie" Johnson, then chairman of Augusta National Golf Club, over admission of female members to Augusta National. Burk contended that hosting the Masters Tournament at a male-only club, constituted sexism because 15% of the club's membership were CEOs, many of them Fortune 500 CEOs. After calls to boycott the companies which sponsored the Masters, Johnson responded by dropping all commercial sponsorship from the tournament in both 2003 and 2004. He argued that he did not want the tournament's sponsors to become associated with a controversy surrounding the club itself. Following the discord, two club members resigned, Thomas H. Wyman, a former CEO of CBS, and John Snow, when President George W. Bush nominated him to serve as Secretary of the Treasury.

By 2011, no woman had been admitted to Augusta National. The controversy was discussed by the International Olympic Committee when re-examining whether golf meets Olympic criteria of a "sport practiced without discrimination with a spirit of friendship, solidarity and fair play." In August 2012, the Augusta National board of directors extended membership to two women, in the wake of two gender discrimination lawsuits facilitated by Burk's organization against companies associated with Augusta National, resulting in $79 million in settlements, and programmatic relief prohibiting these companies from entertaining at or in conjunction with facilities that discriminate on the basis of race or gender.

== Selected bibliography ==
- Burk, Martha; Hartmann, Heidi I. (10 June 1996). "Beyond the gender gap: what must the women's movement do to recover?". The Nation. 262 (23): 18.
