= Billy Payne =

American businessman and sports administrator

Billy Payne Olympic Order
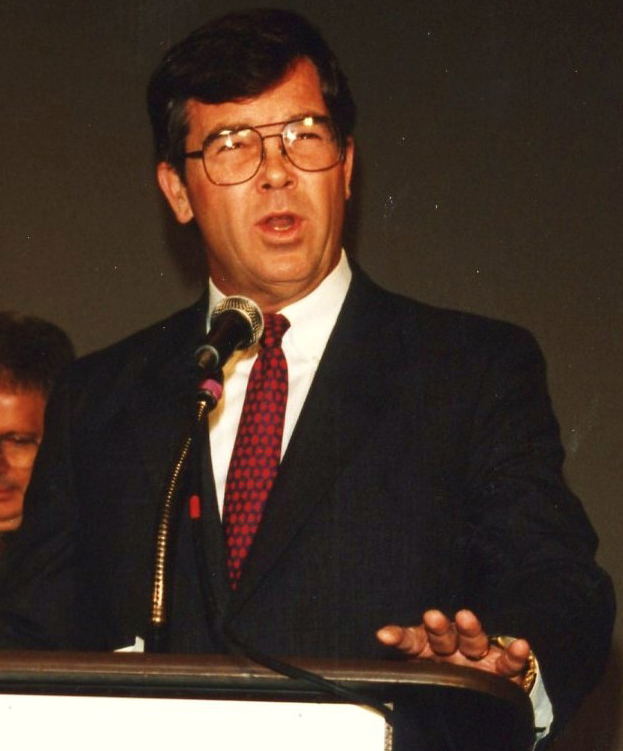
- Payne in 1994

Chairman of Augusta National Golf Club
- In office October 16, 2006 – October 15, 2017
- Preceded by: Hootie Johnson
- Succeeded by: Fred Ridley

President and CEO of the Atlanta Committee for the Olympic Games
- In office August 9, 1992 – August 4, 1996
- IOC President: Juan Antonio Samaranch
- Preceded by: Pasqual Maragall
- Succeeded by: John Iliffe; Michael Knight

Chair of the Atlanta Committee for the Olympic Games
- In office 1991–1996
- Preceded by: Committee established
- Succeeded by: Position dissolved

Personal details
- Born: William Porter Payne; October 13, 1947 (age 78) Athens, Georgia, U.S.
- Education: University of Georgia (BA, JD)

William Porter Payne (born October 13, 1947) is an American lawyer and businessman who served as the former chairman of Augusta National Golf Club, having served in that position from 2006 to 2017 and overseeing the introduction of the first women to the club's membership rolls.

He was managing director of Gleacher & Company, Vice Chairman of Bank of America, Vice Chairman of Premiere Global Services, Inc., Vice Chairman of WebMD, and a member of the board of directors of Lincoln National Corporation and Cousins Properties. He is chairman of Centennial Holding Company, an Atlanta-based real estate investment concern.

Through the late 1980s and early 1990s, Payne was a leading advocate for bringing the Olympic Games to Atlanta and, in 1996, he was named president and chief executive officer of the Atlanta Committee for the Olympic Games.

== Early life and education ==
Born in Athens, Georgia, Payne played football for the hometown University of Georgia; in his sophomore season in 1966, the fourth-ranked Bulldogs lost one game by one point, and he caught a touchdown pass in their Cotton Bowl victory. His number was 87.

Payne received his Bachelor of Arts (A.B.) with honors in political science in 1969 from the university as well as his Juris Doctor (J.D.) from its School of Law in 1973. While at the university, he was initiated into the Gridiron Secret Society and the Georgia Alpha chapter of Phi Delta Theta fraternity. He received an honorary degree Doctor of Laws from Oglethorpe University in 1991.

== 1996 Summer Olympics ==
Payne first had the idea of Atlanta hosting the Olympic Games in 1987 and began to bring others to support this vision. He first gained support of Atlanta leaders for this effort, including then-mayor Andrew Young, an ally who helped Payne convince International Olympic Committee members to award Atlanta the games. Payne's plan for the games depended heavily on private support, leading him to convince sponsors to back the games. In September 1990, Atlanta was selected by the IOC to host the 1996 Games, surprising many.

After winning the bid, Payne remained as the head of the Atlanta Committee for the Olympic Games, serving as the chief administrator to organize the Olympics. He was the first person to lead the bid effort and then remain to lead the Games.

== Tenure as Augusta National chairman ==
On May 5, 2006, Billy Payne was announced as the replacement for Hootie Johnson as chairman of Augusta National Golf Club (ANGC), home of the Masters Tournament, with Payne taking office with the opening of the club's season that October. As chairman, Payne made some adjustments at the Masters, including a new television contract with ESPN that allowed for unprecedented coverage of the par-3 tournament, beginning in 2008. Also that same year, a junior-patrons program was instituted, which allows one Augusta National Golf Club-accredited patron the opportunity to personally bring one junior patron (aged 8–16) free of charge to each of the four competitive rounds of the Masters. The program is not available on practice round days, and is also unavailable to company patrons.

On April 7, 2010, immediately before that year's Masters Tournament, Payne criticized Tiger Woods, stating that he failed as a role model. In the HBO Max documentary series Tiger, Los Angeles Times writer Thomas Bonk said the elite golf tournament always had "a thin undercurrent of racism" and called Payne's comments "a public whipping", a characterization backed up by Bryant Gumbel.

In 2011, Payne and his fellow members at ANGC continued further with diverting from the club's usually uncompromising, tradition-laden ways by establishing another contemporary modification to their featured golf tournament. They sanctioned a video game, Tiger Woods PGA Tour 2012: The Masters, that featured the Masters name, logo, and their fabled golf course. PGA Tour 2012 was so technologically sophisticated that if rain – for example – should happen to be falling in Augusta on the day an end-user powered up the game from anywhere around the world, rain will also be simulated on the end-user's video screen.

Payne said in a statement that the game would "inspire the next generation of golfers". According to Payne's release, the proceeds from sales of the video game made by Augusta National benefited a non-profit foundation that promotes youth golf.

At the 2012 Masters Tournament, the public was reminded that some traditions at ANGC still hold true to form as Payne sideswiped reporters' questions about any prospect of allowing a woman (specifically IBM CEO Virginia Rometty) to join ANGC. Payne explained the issue of who gets invited to join ANGC, which was notoriously known for having male-only members, is "subject to the private deliberations of the members." ANGC offered prior membership to the last four IBM CEOs, as IBM is one of three major corporate sponsors of the Masters. However, on August 20, 2012, Payne announced that former secretary of state Condoleezza Rice and business executive Darla Moore would be the first female members of the club after 75 years of all male membership.

On August 23, 2017, ANGC announced that Payne would retire as chairman of the club effective October 16, to be succeeded by Fred Ridley.

== Honors ==
Payne received the Olympic Order in Gold at the closing ceremonies of the Atlanta Olympic Games in 1996. In 2014, he was inducted as a Georgia Trustee. The honor is given by the Georgia Historical Society, in conjunction with the Governor of Georgia, to individuals whose accomplishments and community service reflect the ideals of the founding body of Trustees, which governed the Georgia colony from 1732 to 1752. He was elected to the World Golf Hall of Fame, class of 2019, in the lifetime achievement category.

Sporting positions
Preceded by (Spain) Pasqual Maragall	President of Organizing Committee for Summer Olympic Games; 1996	Succeeded by (Australia) Michael Knight
