= Fred Ridley =

American amateur golfer and lawyer (born 1952)

Personal information
- Full name: Fred Scobie Ridley
- Nationality: United States
- Born: August 16, 1952 (age 74) Lakeland, Florida, U.S.
- Spouse: Elizabeth Herndon
- Children: 3

Career
- Sport: Golf
- College: University of Florida
- Status: Amateur

Best results in major championships
- Masters Tournament: CUT: 1976, 1977, 1978
- PGA Championship: DNP
- U.S. Open: CUT: 1976
- The Open Championship: CUT: 1976

Chairman of Augusta National Golf Club
- Incumbent
- Assumed office October 16, 2017
- Preceded by: Billy Payne

Fred Scobie Ridley (born August 16, 1952) is an American amateur golfer and golf administrator. Ridley won the U.S. Amateur in 1975, was elected president of the United States Golf Association (USGA) in 2004, and became chairman of Augusta National Golf Club in 2017.

== Early life and education ==
Fred Scobie Ridley was born on August 16, 1952, in Lakeland, Florida. He attended Winter Haven High School in nearby Winter Haven, Florida.

== Amateur career ==
Ridley attended the University of Florida in Gainesville, Florida. While attending the university, he played for coach Buster Bishop's Florida Gators men's golf team and was an alternate on the Gators golf team that won the NCAA national tournament in 1973. He graduated from the University of Florida's College of Business Administration with a bachelor's degree in marketing in 1974.

In 1975, Ridley won the U.S. Amateur, the preeminent amateur golf tournament in the United States, on the James River Course of the Country Club of Virginia in Richmond, Virginia. He defeated Keith Fergus in the 36-hole final, having beaten Curtis Strange and Andy Bean in previous rounds of the match-play championship. At the end of 1975 Ridley was ranked the #2 amateur in the country by Golf Digest.

In 1976 he won the Monroe Invitational. He also competed in the 1976 British Open later in the year. Ridley was a member of the 1976 Eisenhower Trophy team. Late in the year he was ranked the #10 amateur in the country by Golf Digest.

In 1977 he competed in the British Amateur. In the 1977 Walker Cup, he won two singles matches (both against Sandy Lyle) and lost his foursomes match.

Between 1974 and 1977 Ridley was a law student. He earned a Juris Doctor degree from Stetson University College of Law in 1977.

== Later career ==
Ridley never turned professional. Ridley remains the last U.S. Amateur champion to have never become a professional golfer. Ridley worked as a lawyer and golf administrator for most of his career.

Ridley still occasionally played notable amateur events, however. For example, Ridley played the 1987 British Amateur. He also served as captain for the American sides of the 1987 Walker Cup, 1989 Walker Cup, and the 2010 Eisenhower Trophy.

Ridley was elected president of the United States Golf Association (USGA) in 2004. He has also served as co-chairman of the International Golf Federation. He had been elected as a member of the executive board, treasurer, vice president of the USGA, and has also served as the chairman of the USGA's Championship Committee, Amateur Status and Conduct Committee, and International Team Selection Committee. Late in his career he was inducted into the University of Florida Athletic Hall of Fame as a "Distinguished Letterwinner."

Ridley, who is a member of Augusta National Golf Club, served as the competition committee chairman for 2011 Masters Tournament. On August 23, 2017, Augusta National announced that Ridley would succeed Billy Payne as chairman of the club. Ridley took over when the club reopened for its 2017–18 season on October 16, 2017.

== Personal life ==
Ridley works as a commercial real estate lawyer in Tampa, Florida. He is a partner in the law firm of Foley & Lardner, and practices in the areas of commercial real estate finance and development, planned unit development, resort development, and multifamily and condominium development. He is married to the former Elizabeth ("Betsy") Herndon, a fellow University of Florida graduate. They have three daughters.

== Amateur wins ==
- 1975 U.S. Amateur
- 1976 Monroe Invitational

== Results in major championships ==
Tournament	1976	1977	1978
Masters Tournament	CUT	CUT	CUT
U.S. Open	CUT		
The Open Championship	CUT		

Note: Ridley never played in the PGA Championship.

Did not play

CUT = missed the half-way cut

== U.S. national team appearances ==
Amateur

- Eisenhower Trophy: 1976
- Walker Cup: 1977 (winners), 1987 (winners, non-playing captain), 1989 (non-playing captain)

== See also ==
- Florida Gators
- List of Stetson University College of Law alumni
- List of University of Florida alumni
- List of University of Florida Athletic Hall of Fame members
