= Masters Tournament =

Golf tournament held in Augusta, Georgia, United States

Coordinates: 33.5025°N 82.0200°W

Tournament information
- Location: Augusta, Georgia, U.S.
- Established: 1934; 92 years ago
- Course: Augusta National Golf Club
- Par: 72
- Length: 7,565 yards (6,917 m)
- Organized by: Augusta National Golf Club
- Tours: PGA Tour; European Tour; Japan Golf Tour
- Format: Stroke play
- Prize fund: US$22,500,000
- Month played: April (Note: An exception is the 2020 Masters Tournament, which was played in November after the suspension of the 2019–20 PGA Tour due to the COVID-19 pandemic.)
- Website: masters.com

Tournament record score
- Aggregate: 268 Dustin Johnson (2020)
- To par: −20 as above

Current champion
- (Northern Ireland) Rory McIlroy (2026)

Current tournament
- 2026 Masters Tournament

Location map
- Location in United States Location in Georgia

The Masters Tournament (usually referred to as simply the Masters, or as the U.S. Masters outside North America) is one of the four men's major championships in professional golf. Scheduled for the first full week in April, the Masters is the first major golf tournament of the year. Unlike the other major tournaments which change host venues with each tournament, the Masters is always held at the same host venue: Augusta National Golf Club, a private course in the city of Augusta, Georgia.

Amateur golf champion Bobby Jones and investment banker Clifford Roberts founded the tournament. After his grand slam in 1930, Jones acquired a former plant nursery and co-designed Augusta National with course architect Alister MacKenzie. First played in 1934 as the "Augusta National Invitation Tournament", (Note: The tournament was officially renamed the 'Masters Tournament' in 1939, although it was informally called 'the Masters' from the beginning.) the Masters is an official money event on the PGA Tour, the European Tour, and the Japan Golf Tour. The field of players is smaller than those of the other major championships because it is an invitational event, held by the Augusta National Golf Club.

The tournament has a number of traditions. Since the 1949 Masters, a green jacket (specifically Pantone 342C, "Augusta Green") has been awarded to the champion, who must return it to the clubhouse one year after his victory, although it remains his personal property and is stored with other champions' jackets in a specially designated cloakroom. In most instances, only a first-time and reigning champion may remove his jacket from the club grounds. A golfer who wins the event multiple times uses the same green jacket awarded upon his initial win unless he needs to be re-fitted with a new jacket. The Champions Dinner, inaugurated by Ben Hogan at the 1952 Masters, is held on the Tuesday before each Masters and is open only to past champions and certain board members of the Augusta National Golf Club. Beginning in 1963, distinguished golfers, usually past champions, have hit an honorary tee shot on the morning of the first round to commence play. These have included Fred McLeod, Jock Hutchinson, Gene Sarazen, Sam Snead, Byron Nelson, Arnold Palmer, Jack Nicklaus, Gary Player, Lee Elder, and Tom Watson. Since 1960, a semi-social contest on the Par 3 course has been played on Wednesday, the day before the first round.

Nicklaus has the most Masters wins, with six between 1963 and 1986. Tiger Woods won five between 1997 and 2019. Palmer won four between 1958 and 1964. Five have won three titles at Augusta: Jimmy Demaret, Sam Snead, Gary Player, Nick Faldo, and Phil Mickelson. Gary Player, from South Africa, was the first non-American player to win the tournament, in 1961; the second was Seve Ballesteros of Spain, the champion in 1980 and 1983.

The Augusta National course first opened in 1933 and has been modified many times by different architects. Among the changes: greens have been reshaped and, on occasion, entirely re-designed, bunkers have been added, water hazards have been extended, new tee boxes have been built, hundreds of trees have been planted, and several mounds have been installed.

== History ==
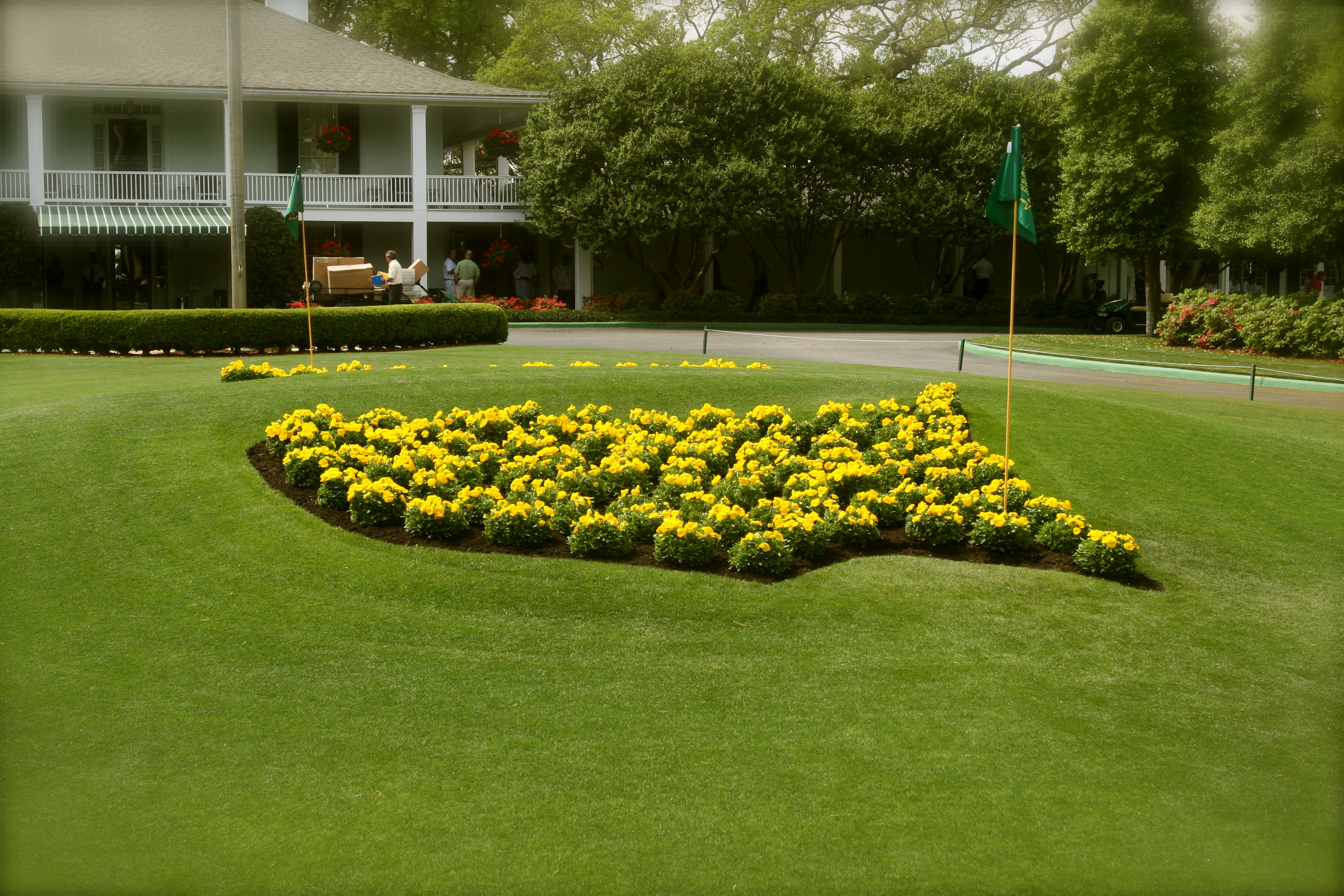
Masters logo at the club entrance known as Founder's Circle

=== Augusta National Golf Club ===
The idea for Augusta National originated with Bobby Jones, who wanted to build a golf course after his retirement from the game. He sought advice from Clifford Roberts, who later became the chairman of the club. They came across a piece of land in Augusta, Georgia, of which Jones said: "Perfect! And to think this ground has been lying here all these years waiting for someone to come along and lay a golf course upon it." The land had been an indigo plantation in the early nineteenth century and a plant nursery since 1857. Jones hired Alister MacKenzie to help design the course, and work began in 1931. The course formally opened in 1933, but MacKenzie died before the first Masters Tournament was played.

=== Early tournament years ===
After Clifford Roberts invited then-USGA tournament committee chairman Prescott Bush to ANGC in early 1933, Jones and Roberts strenuously petitioned the USGA to hold the U.S. Open at Augusta in 1934, but the USGA denied the petition, noting that the hot Georgia summers would create difficult playing conditions. Indeed, the professional golf schedule would have needed to change, and to date no golf major had been held in the south. The club was deeply disappointed and had been seeking publicity as it was struggling financially and in debt, but Roberts took the rejection as an opportunity to found his own annual tournament.

Roberts told the PGA of his plan for a new tournament in late 1933. The official PGA schedule, in a small endnote, mentioned Augusta's tournament alongside three others: the 1934 Tournament of the Gardens Open, the 1934 North and South Open, and a tournament in Columbus, Georgia. The fact that the new tournament would bring Jones out of retirement made the idea attractive to both Augusta and the PGA, which itself was facing hard times financially; Grantland Rice announced the news in a syndicated column.

Due to Augusta National's financial hardships, the tournament was set to feature a small contingent of players. Initially the Augusta National Invitation field was composed largely of Bobby Jones' close associates. Due to the early calendar date of the Masters, it was not uncommon for professional golfers to be unable to attend because of jobs and prior commitments.

The first "Augusta National Invitation Tournament", as the Masters was originally known, began on March 22, 1934, and was won by Horton Smith, who took the first prize of $1,500. (The club could not afford to pay the winnings, so 17 Augusta National members personally chipped in instead.) Roberts had borrowed chairs for spectators to use from two local funeral homes, and the printed program included advertisements given for free to the club's creditors. Tournament passes cost $2.00. The tournament was played with current holes 10 through 18 played as the first nine, and 1 through 9 as the second nine, then reversed permanently to its present layout for the 1935 tournament. After the first tournament, around 20 new members joined ANGC, giving the club a much-needed financial lifeline.

The present name, Masters Tournament, was officially adopted in 1939, but had been in use since the first tournament (newspapers sometimes called it the "Masters Open").

Gene Sarazen hit the "shot heard 'round the world" in 1935, holing a shot from the fairway on the par 5 15th for a double eagle (albatross). This tied Sarazen with Craig Wood, and in the ensuing 36-hole playoff, Sarazen was the victor by five strokes. Roberts would later contend that Sarazen's shot had "put the Masters in business", but attendance fell in 1935 and 1936. Throughout the rest of the 1930s, the numbers of players who accepted tournament invitations fell despite an increase in sent invitations, falling to a nadir of 42 golfers at the 1938 Masters. The club was in an inconvenient location and the effects of the Depression were still lingering.

The gallery for Sunday's final two rounds at the 1939 Masters was estimated at 10,000 spectators.

In 1940, Roberts stated that the Masters was one of the top tournaments in the United States, if not the biggest. He stated, "I am told that the Masters has outdistanced in attendance both the U.S. Amateur and the PGA." The tournament was not played from 1943 to 1945, due to World War II. To assist the war effort, cattle and turkeys were raised on the Augusta National grounds.

After the war, ticket sales were still a struggle: club member Jerry Franklin would plead with Augusta Chronicle owner William Morris Jr. to buy a group of tickets.

Byron Nelson won the first of two Masters titles in 1937. Jimmy Demaret won three times as did Sam Snead in the 1940s and 1950s. Ben Hogan won the 1951 and 1953 Masters and was runner-up on four occasions.

The club raised ticket prices to $10 for the 1951 tournament; spectators were not pleased.

=== 1960s–1970s ===
Through the 50s and into the 60s, the Masters was still not widely attended. Locals were able to buy tickets at the gate on the day of each round. The city held a "Masters hospitality week", featuring a parade, from 1957 through 1967.

In 1967, series badge prices rose to $15; by 1975, they were $30.

The "Big Three" of Arnold Palmer, Gary Player, and Jack Nicklaus dominated the Masters from 1960 through 1978, winning the event 11 times between them during that span. After winning by one stroke in 1958, Palmer won by one stroke again in 1960 in memorable circumstances. Trailing Ken Venturi by one shot in the 1960 event, Palmer made birdies on the last two holes to prevail. Palmer would go on to win another two Masters in 1962 and 1964. Palmer's caddie at Augusta each time was Nathaniel "Iron Man" Avery.

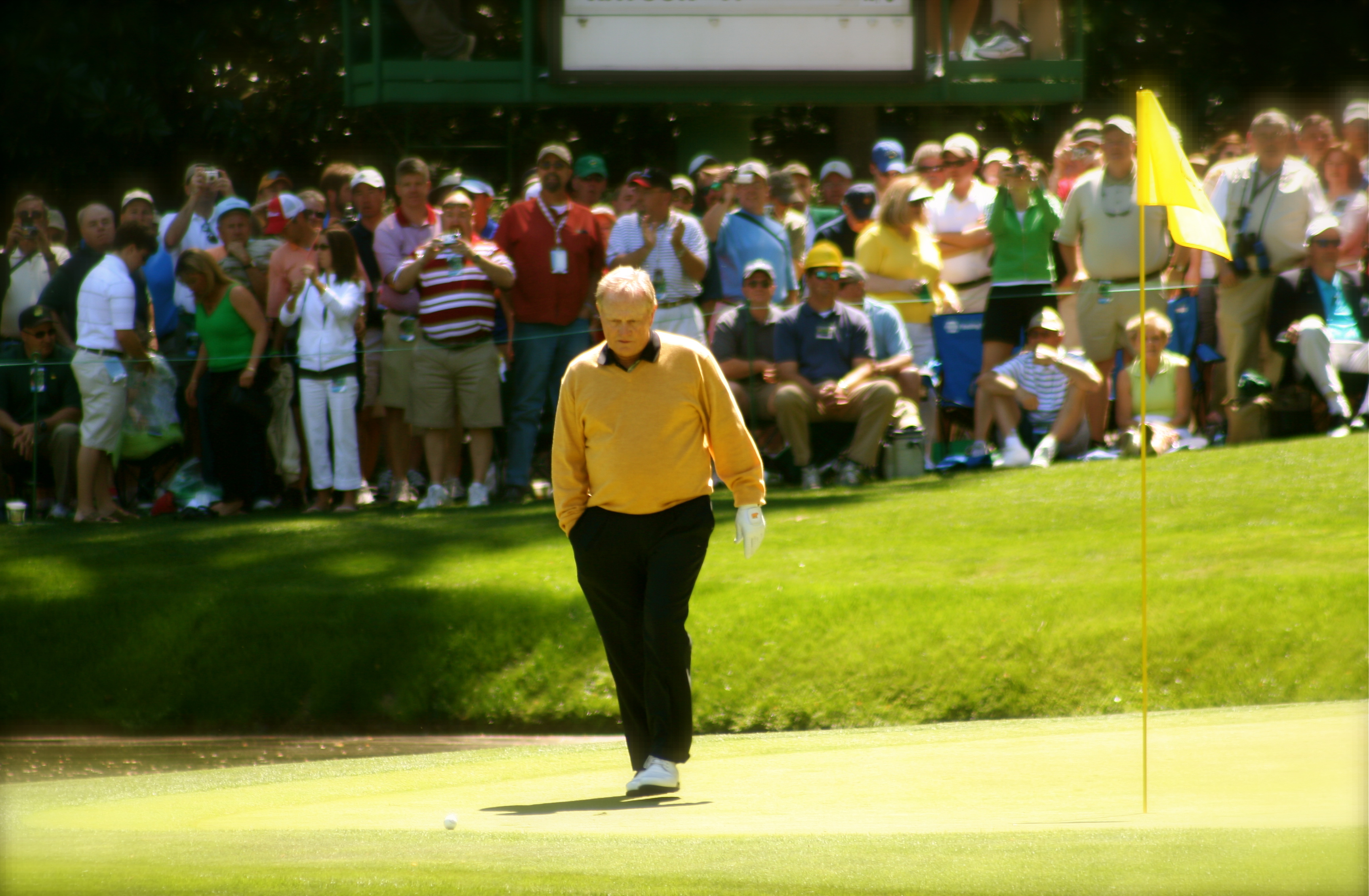
Jack Nicklaus at the 2006 par 3 contest

Nicklaus emerged in the early 1960s and served as a rival to the popular Palmer. Nicklaus won his first green jacket in 1963, defeating Tony Lema by one stroke. Two years later, he shot a then-course record of 271 (17 under par) for his second Masters win, leading Bobby Jones to say that Nicklaus played "a game with which I am not familiar." The next year, Nicklaus won his third green jacket in a grueling 18-hole playoff against Tommy Jacobs and Gay Brewer. This made Nicklaus the first player to win consecutive Masters. He won again in 1972 by three strokes. In 1975, Nicklaus won by one stroke in a close contest with Tom Weiskopf and Johnny Miller in one of the most exciting Masters to date.

Player became the first non-American to win the Masters in 1961, beating Palmer, the defending champion, by one stroke when Palmer double-bogeyed the final hole. In 1974, he won again by two strokes. After not winning a tournament on the U.S. PGA tour for nearly four years, and at the age of 42, Player won his third and final Masters in 1978 by one stroke over three players. Player is second in consecutive cuts made with 23 straight (tied with Fred Couples), and has played in a record 52 Masters.

A controversial ending to the Masters occurred in 1968. Argentine champion Roberto De Vicenzo signed his scorecard (attested by playing partner Tommy Aaron) incorrectly recording him as making a par 4 instead of a birdie 3 on the 17th hole of the final round. According to the rules of golf, if a player signs a scorecard (thereby attesting to its veracity) that records a score on a hole higher than what he actually made on the hole, the player receives the higher score for that hole. This extra stroke cost De Vicenzo a chance to be in an 18-hole Monday playoff with Bob Goalby, who won the green jacket. De Vicenzo's mistake led to the famous quote, "What a stupid I am."

In 1975, Lee Elder became the first African American to play in the Masters, doing so 15 years before Augusta National admitted its first black member, Ron Townsend, as a result of the Shoal Creek Controversy.

=== 1980s–2000s ===
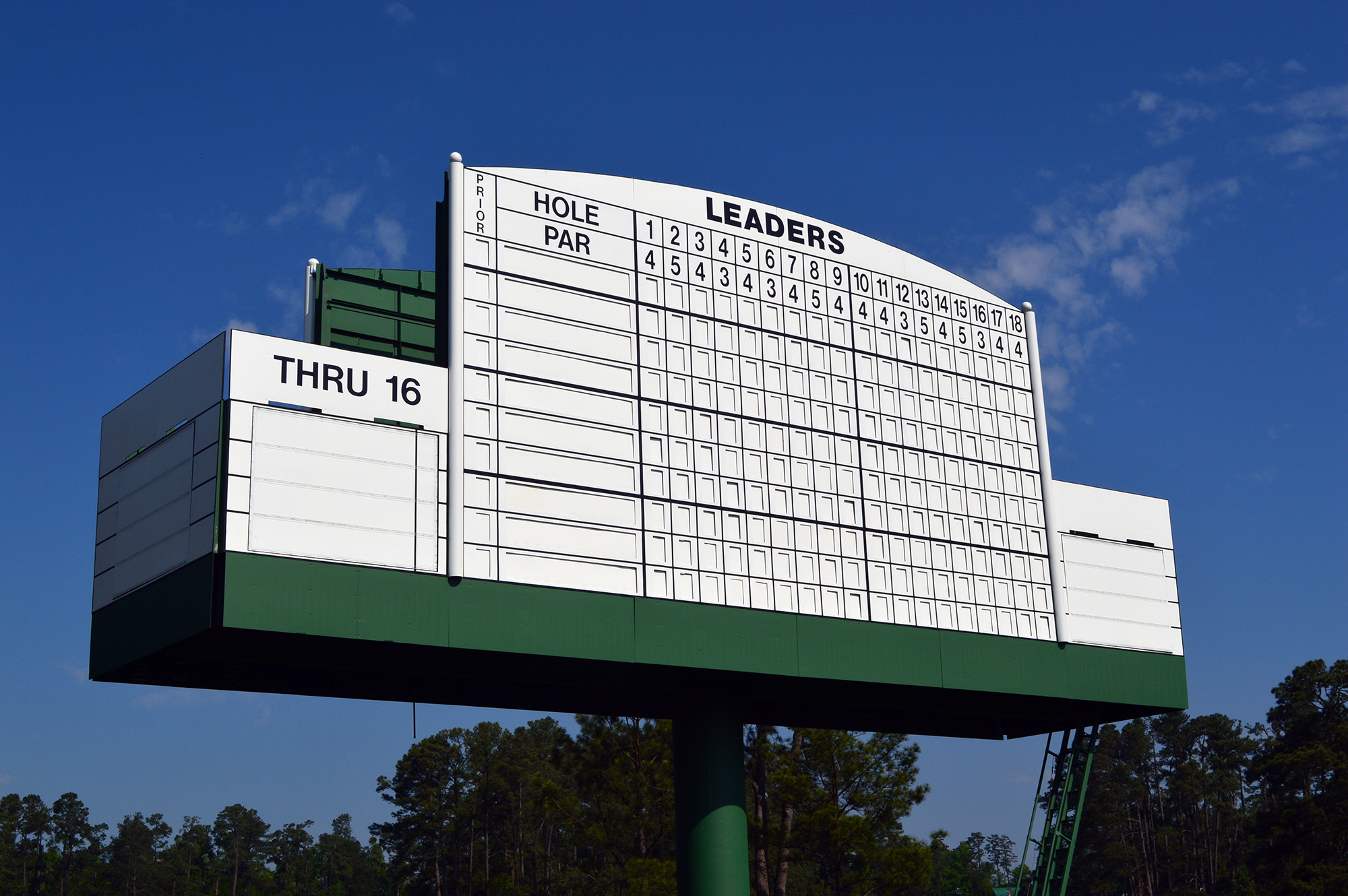
A leaderboard at the Masters

Non-Americans collected 11 victories in 20 years in the 1980s and 1990s, by far the strongest run they have had in any of the three majors played in the United States since the early days of the U.S. Open. The first European to win the Masters was Seve Ballesteros in 1980; badges at that point were $48. Nicklaus became the oldest player to win the Masters in 1986 when he won for the sixth time at age 46.

During this period, no golfer suffered more disappointment at the Masters than Greg Norman. In his first appearance at Augusta in 1981, he led during the second nine but ended up finishing fourth. In 1986, after birdieing holes 14 through 17 to tie Nicklaus for the lead, he badly pushed his 4-iron approach on 18 into the patrons surrounding the green and missed his par putt for a closing bogey. In 1987, Norman lost a sudden-death playoff when Larry Mize holed out a remarkable 45-yard pitch shot to birdie the second playoff hole. Mize thus became the first Augusta native to win the Masters. In 1996, Norman tied the course record with an opening-round 63 and had a six-stroke lead over Nick Faldo entering the final round. However, he stumbled to a closing 78 while Faldo, his playing partner that day, carded a 67 to win by five shots for his third Masters championship. Norman also led the 1999 Masters on the second nine of the final round, only to falter again and finish third behind winner José María Olazábal, who won his second green jacket. Norman finished in the top five at the Masters eight times, but never won.

In 1993, the price of a four-day badge was raised to $100.

Two-time champion Ben Crenshaw captured an emotional Masters win in 1995, just days after the death of his lifelong teacher and mentor Harvey Penick. After making his final putt to win, he broke down sobbing at the hole and was consoled and embraced by his caddie Carl Jackson. In the post-tournament interview, Crenshaw said: "I had a 15th club in my bag," a reference to Penick. (The "15th club" reference is based on the golf rule that limits a player to carrying 14 clubs during a round.) Crenshaw first won at Augusta in 1984.

In 1997, 21-year-old Tiger Woods became the youngest champion in Masters history, winning by 12 shots with an 18-under par 270 which broke the 72-hole record that had stood for 32 years. In 2001, Woods completed his "Tiger Slam" by winning his fourth straight major championship at the Masters by two shots over David Duval. He won again the following year, making him only the third player in history (after Nicklaus and Faldo) to win the tournament in consecutive years, as well as in 2005 when he defeated Chris DiMarco in a playoff for his first major championship win in almost three years.

The cost of a four-day badge rose to $125 for the 2001 tournament.

In 2003, the Augusta National Golf Club was targeted by Martha Burk, who organized a failed protest at that year's Masters to pressure the club into accepting female members. Burk planned to protest at the front gates of Augusta National during the third day of the tournament, but her application for a permit to do so was denied. A court appeal was dismissed. In 2004, Burk stated that she had no further plans to protest against the club. The club admitted its first two women members, Condoleezza Rice and Darla Moore, in 2012.

Augusta National chairman Billy Payne himself made headlines in April 2010 when he commented at the annual pre-Masters press conference on Tiger Woods' off-the-course behavior. "It's not simply the degree of his conduct that is so egregious here," Payne said, in his opening speech. "It is the fact he disappointed all of us and more importantly our kids and grandkids."

In 2003, Mike Weir became the first Canadian to win a men's major championship and the first left-hander to win the Masters when he defeated Len Mattiace in a playoff. The following year another left-hander, Phil Mickelson, won his first major championship by making a birdie on the final hole to beat Ernie Els by a stroke. Mickelson also won the tournament in 2006 and 2010. In 2011, unheralded South African Charl Schwartzel birdied the final four holes to win by two strokes. In 2012, Bubba Watson won the tournament on the second playoff hole over Louis Oosthuizen. In 2013 Adam Scott won the Masters in a playoff over 2009 champion Ángel Cabrera, making him the first Australian to win the tournament. Watson won the 2014 Masters by three strokes over Jordan Spieth and Jonas Blixt, his second Masters title in three years and the sixth for a left-hander in 12 years. In 2015, Spieth would become the second-youngest winner (behind Woods) in just his second Masters, equaling Woods' 72-hole scoring record. In 2017, Sergio García beat Justin Rose in a playoff for his long-awaited first major title. In 2019, Tiger Woods captured his fifth Masters, his first win at Augusta National in 14 years and his first major title since 2008.

In 2009, the price for a four-day badge rose to $200; it hit $250 in 2012, and $325 in 2015.

The 2020 Masters Tournament, originally scheduled to be played April 9–12, was postponed until November due to the coronavirus outbreak. Dustin Johnson won the tournament by five strokes.

Rory McIlroy's No. 12 tee shot in the second round on April 10, 2026.

In 2025, a monument in Augusta, Georgia was erected by artist Baruti Tucker to honor the black caddies at Augusta National Golf Club for the Masters Tournament. Rory McIlroy won the 2025 Masters and completed the sixth grand slam in a playoff over Justin Rose. The next year, McIlroy won again, becoming the fourth player to go back-to-back at the Masters.

The price for a four-day badge to the Masters rose to $450 in 2023, and reached $525 for 2026.

== Traditions, logistics, and rules ==
Augusta National annual golf schedule
Friday	Saturday	Sunday	Monday	Tuesday	Wednesday	Thursday	Friday	Saturday	Sunday
Augusta National Women's Amateur (final round)		Drive, Chip and Putt	Masters practice rounds			Masters Tournament			
Augusta National Women's Amateur (final round)		Drive, Chip and Putt	Amateur Dinner	Champions' Dinner	Par 3 Contest	Masters Tournament			

=== Pre-tournament events ===
==== Augusta National Women's Amateur ====
The Augusta National Women's Amateur (ANWA) is held the week before the Masters. The ANWA was established in 2019 by Augusta National chairman Fred Ridley. The winner of the Augusta National Women's Amateur is exempt from two women's golf majors.

==== Drive, Chip and Putt ====
In 2013, Augusta National partnered with the USGA and the PGA of America to establish "Drive, Chip and Putt" (DCP), a youth golf skills competition which was first held in 2014. The event was established as part of an effort to help promote the sport of golf among youth; the winners of local qualifiers in different age groups advance to the national finals, which have been held at Augusta National on the Sunday immediately preceding the Masters. The driving and chipping portions of the event are held on the course's practice range, and the putting portion has been played on the 18th hole.

==== Practice rounds ====
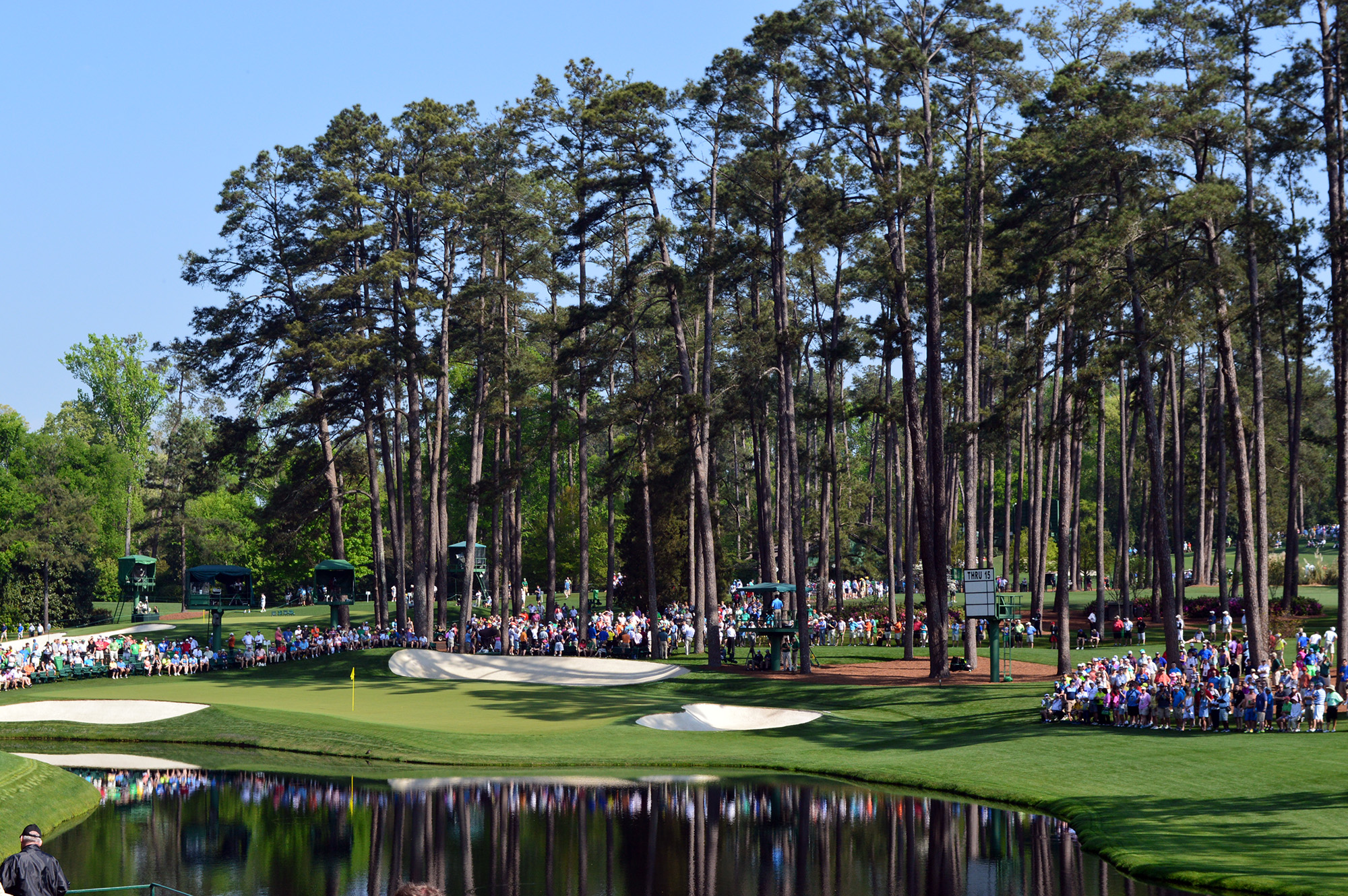
Hole 16, Redbud, where spectators encourage players to skip the ball across the pond

Practice rounds are held on the Monday, Tuesday, and Wednesday before the tournament begins on Thursday. During the practice rounds, Redbud (hole 16) is well-known for spectators shouting "Skip it!" at players, encouraging the golfers to attempt to skip the ball across the pond.

The three days of practice are the only times during which attendees are allowed to bring cameras onto the course.

==== Amateur Dinner ====
First established in 1948, the Amateur Dinner is held on the Monday before the tournament, on the same day practice rounds begin. The amateurs competing in the Masters are invited.

==== Champions' Dinner ====
The Champions' Dinner is held each year on the Tuesday evening preceding Thursday's first round. The dinner was first held in 1952, hosted by defending champion Ben Hogan, to honor the past champions of the tournament. At that time 15 tournaments had been played, and the number of past champions was 11. Officially known as the "Masters Club", it includes only past winners of the Masters, although selected members of the Augusta National Golf Club have been included as honorary members, usually the chairman.

The defending champion, as host, selects the menu for the dinner. Frequently, Masters champions have served cuisine from their home regions prepared by the Masters chef. Notable examples have included haggis, served by Scotsman Sandy Lyle in 1989, and bobotie, a South African dish, served at the behest of 2008 champion Trevor Immelman. Other examples include German Bernhard Langer's 1986 Wiener schnitzel, Britain's Nick Faldo's fish and chips, Canadian Mike Weir's elk and wild boar, and Vijay Singh's tom kha thale and chicken phanaeng. The 2011 dinner of Phil Mickelson was a Spanish-themed menu in hopes that Seve Ballesteros would attend, but he was too sick and died weeks later.

In 1998, Tiger Woods served cheeseburgers, chicken sandwiches, french fries and milkshakes. Woods was the youngest winner, and when asked about his food choices, he responded with "They said you could pick anything you want ... Hey, it's part of being young, that's what I eat." Fuzzy Zoeller, the 1979 champion, created a media storm when he suggested that Woods refrain from serving collard greens and fried chicken, dishes commonly associated with African-American culture.

==== Par 3 Contest ====
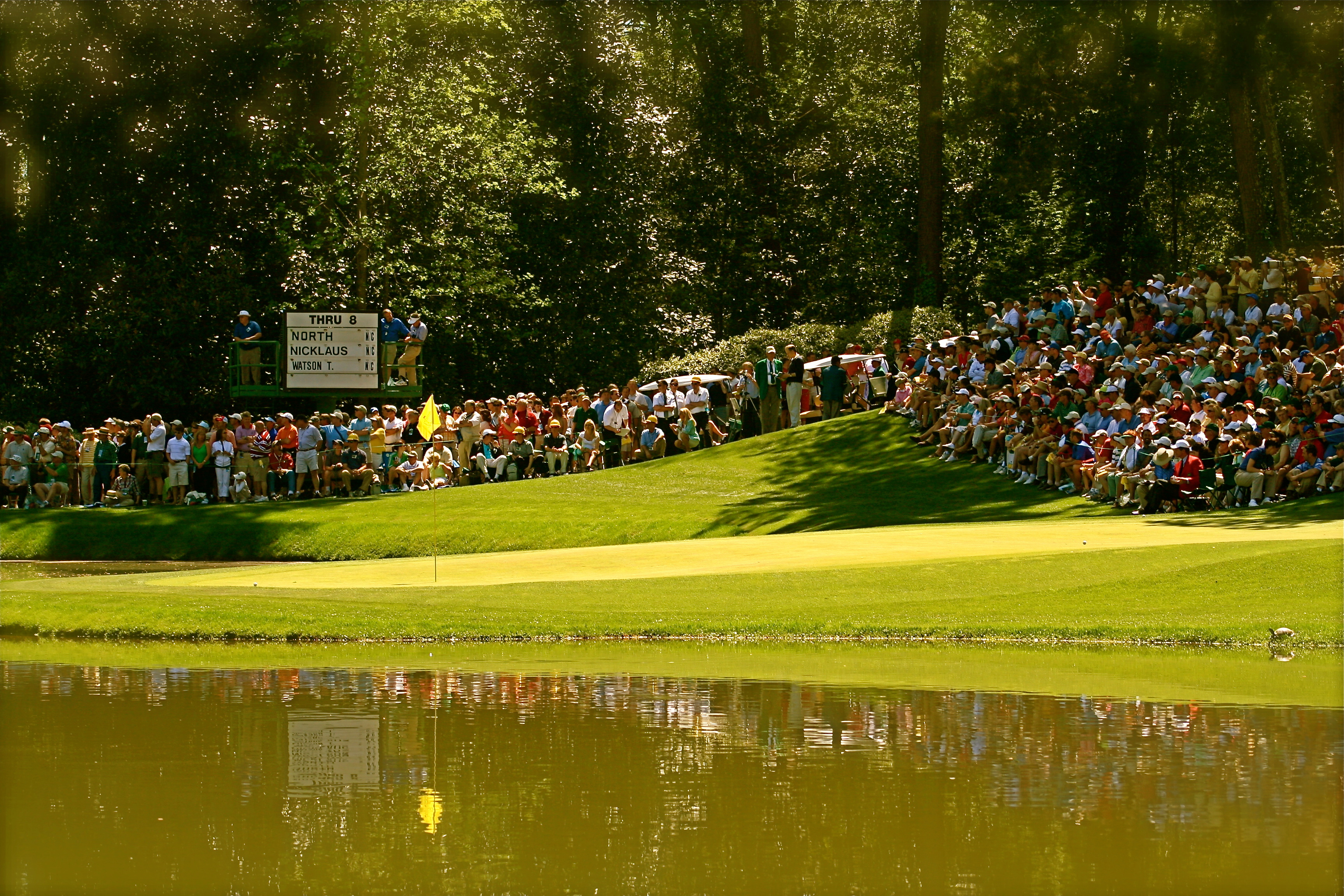
The 9th hole on the Par 3 Course

The Par 3 Contest was first introduced in 1960, and was won that year by Snead. Since then it has traditionally been played on the Wednesday before the tournament starts. The Par 3 Course was built in 1958. It is a nine-hole course with a par of 27 and a length of 1,090 yards (1,000 m).

Through 2026, 119 holes-in-one had been recorded in the contest, with a record nine occurring in 2016, during which Rickie Fowler and Justin Thomas scored back-to-back holes in one on the 4th hole, while playing in a group with reigning champion Jordan Spieth. In the 2015 Par 3 Contest, Camilo Villegas made holes-in-one on the fourth and eighth holes. This achievement was duplicated by Séamus Power, who scored back-to-back holes in one on holes 8 and 9 during the 2023 Par 3 Contest. As of 2026, no Par 3 Contest winner has also won the Masters in the same year. There have been several repeat winners, including Pádraig Harrington, Sandy Lyle, Sam Snead, and Tom Watson.

Players often have family members, including their spouses, children and grandchildren, serve as caddies during the contest. In 2008, the event was televised for the first time by ESPN.

The winner of the Par 3 Contest, which is played the day before the tournament begins, wins a crystal bowl.

=== Tournament ===
==== Opening tee shot ====
Since 1963, the custom in most years has been to start the tournament with an honorary opening tee shot at the first hole, typically by one or more older players. For a number of years before 1963, Jock Hutchison and Fred McLeod had been the first pair to tee off, both being able to play as past major championship winners. In 1963 the eligibility rules were changed and they were no longer able to compete. The idea of honorary starters was introduced with Hutchison and McLeod being the first two. This twosome led off every tournament from 1963 until 1973 when poor health prevented Hutchison from swinging a club. McLeod continued on until his death in 1976. Byron Nelson and Gene Sarazen started in 1981 and were then joined by Sam Snead in 1984. This trio continued until 1999 when Sarazen died, while Nelson stopped in 2001. Snead hit his final opening tee shot in 2002, a little over a month before he died.

In 2007, Arnold Palmer took over as the honorary starter. Palmer also had the honor in 2008 and 2009. At the 2010 and 2011 Masters Tournaments, Jack Nicklaus joined Palmer as an honorary starter for the event. In 2012, Gary Player joined them. Palmer announced in March 2016 that a lingering shoulder issue would prevent him from partaking in the 2016 tee shot. Palmer was still in attendance for the ceremony.

Following Palmer's death in 2016, the 2017 ceremony featured tributes; his green jacket was draped over an empty white chair, while everyone in attendance wore "Arnie's Army" badges.

In 2021 Lee Elder joined Nicklaus and Player as an honorary starter. He was invited to join them as he was the first African-American to take part in the Masters in 1975. Despite bad health preventing Elder from hitting a shot, he was still present and received a standing ovation from the crowd.

Two-time Masters champion Tom Watson joined Nicklaus and Player, starting in 2022.

==== Caddies ====
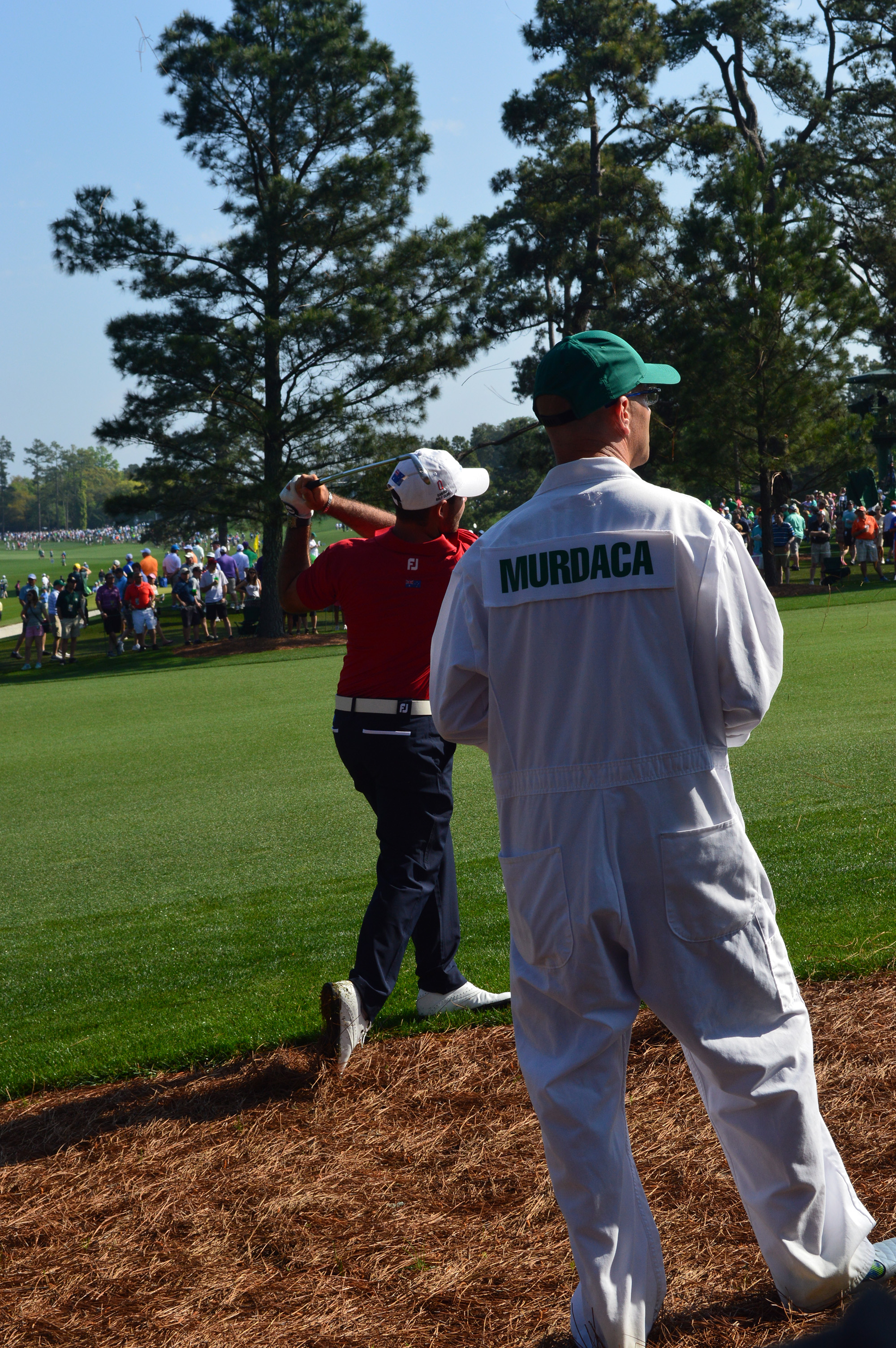
A caddie at the Masters (right) in white jumpsuit bearing player's name

Until 1983, all players in the Masters were required to use the services of an Augusta National Club caddie, who by club tradition was always an African-American man. Club co-founder Clifford Roberts is reputed to have said, "As long as I'm alive, golfers will be white, and caddies will be black." Since 1983—six years after Roberts's death in 1977—players have been allowed the option of bringing their own caddie to the tournament.

The Masters requires caddies to wear a uniform consisting of a white jumpsuit, a green Masters cap, and white tennis shoes. The surname, and sometimes first initial, of each player is found on the back of his caddie's uniform. The defending champion always receives caddie number "1": other golfers get their caddie numbers from the order in which they register for the tournament. The other majors and some PGA Tour events formerly had a similar policy concerning caddies well into the 1970s; the U.S. Open first allowed players to use their own caddies in 1976.

==== Awards ====
The total prize money for the 2025 Masters Tournament was $21,000,000, with $4,200,000 going to the winner. In the inaugural year of 1934, the winner Horton Smith received $1,500 out of a $5,000 purse. After Nicklaus's first win in 1963, he received $20,000, while after his final victory in 1986 he won $144,000. In recent years the purse has grown quickly. Between 2001 and 2014, the winner's share grew by $612,000, and the purse grew by $3,400,000.

===== Green jacket =====
In addition to a cash prize, the tournament winner receives a green jacket, a tradition introduced in 1949. Previous champions were also awarded jackets retroactively. The green sport coat is the official attire worn by members of Augusta National while on the club grounds; each Masters winner becomes an honorary member of the club. The winner is presented with the green jacket in a televised ceremony in Butler Cabin, followed by a second presentation outside the clubhouse in front of patrons. Winners keep their jacket for the year after their victory, then return it to the club to wear whenever they are present on the club grounds. Sam Snead was the first Masters champion to be awarded the green jacket after he took his first Masters title in 1949.

The green jacket is only allowed to be removed from the Augusta National grounds by the reigning champion, after which it must remain at the club. Exceptions to this rule include Gary Player, who in his joy of winning mistakenly took his jacket home to South Africa after his 1961 victory; Seve Ballesteros who, in an interview with Peter Alliss from his home in Pedreña, showed one of his two green jackets in his trophy room. Ballesteros declined a request from Augusta National chairman Hootie Johnson to return his jacket in 2002. Henry Picard's jacket, which was removed from the club before the tradition was well established, remained in his closet for a number of years, and is now on display at Canterbury Golf Club in Beachwood, Ohio, where he was the club professional for many years.

By tradition, the winner of the previous year's Masters Tournament puts the jacket on the winner at the end of the tournament. In 1966, Jack Nicklaus became the first player to win in consecutive years and he donned the jacket himself. When Nick Faldo (in 1990), Tiger Woods (in 2002), and Rory McIlroy (in 2026) won in consecutive years, the chairman of Augusta National put the jacket on them.

In addition to the green jacket, winners of the tournament receive a gold medal. In 2017, a green jacket that was found at a thrift store in 1994 was sold at auction for $139,000.

===== Trophies =====
Winners also have their names engraved on the actual silver Masters trophy. The runner-up receives a silver medal, introduced in 1951. Beginning in 1978, a silver salver was added as an award for the runner-up.

In 1952, the Masters began presenting an award, known as the Silver Cup, to the lowest scoring amateur to make the cut. In 1954, they began presenting an amateur silver medal to the low amateur runner-up.

The original trophy weighs over 130 pounds (59 kg) and sits on a 4-foot-wide (1.2 m) base. It resides permanently at Augusta National and depicts the clubhouse. Winners instead receive a replica, which is significantly smaller, stands just 6.5 inches (17 cm) tall, and weighs 20 pounds (9.1 kg), which they get to keep. The champion and the runner-up both have their names engraved on the permanent trophy.

There are several awards presented to players who perform exceptional feats during the tournament. The player who has the daily lowest score receives a crystal vase, while players who score a hole-in-one or a double eagle win a large crystal bowl. For each eagle a player makes, they receive a pair of crystal goblets.

The Double Eagle trophy was introduced in 1967 when Bruce Devlin holed out for double eagle on number 8. He was only the second to do so, and the first in 32 years, following Gene Sarazen on hole 15 in 1935. The trophy is a large crystal bowl with "Masters Tournament" engraved around the top.

==== Player invitations ====
As with the other majors, winning the Masters gives a golfer several privileges which make his career more secure. Masters champions are automatically invited to play in the other three majors (the U.S. Open, The Open Championship, and the PGA Championship) for the next five years (except for amateur winners, unless they turn pro within the five-year period), and earn a lifetime invitation to the Masters. They also receive membership on the PGA Tour for the following five seasons and invitations to The Players Championship for five years.

Because the tournament was established by a lifelong amateur, Bobby Jones, the Masters has a tradition of honoring amateur golf. For much of its history it extended invitations to a substantial number of top players from the previous year's U.S. Amateur (other majors traditionally only would automatically invite the winner and possibly the runner-up), as well as all American players from team competitions such as the Walker Cup and Eisenhower Trophy. While changes to qualification rules have lowered the amount of amateurs in the field, it still invites winners of the most prestigious amateur tournaments in the world. Also, the current U.S. Amateur champion always plays in the same group as the defending Masters champion for the first two days of the tournament.

Amateurs in the field are welcome to stay in the "Crow's Nest" atop the Augusta National clubhouse during the tournament. The Crow's Nest is 1,200 square feet (110 m^{2}) with lodging space for five during the competition.

While the tournament now has a wide range of qualifying criteria for international golfers, for much of its history the only point of entry to the Masters for non-Americans was via "special international invitation", or by winning or placing highly in the tournament in a previous year. 1999 was the first year the Official World Golf Ranking was used to give invitations to top players who mostly played outside the PGA Tour, followed a year later by exemptions for top finishers in the Open Championship

=== Experience and hospitality ===
==== Berckmans Place ====
Berckmans Place, sometimes called Berckmans or BP, is a 90,000-square-foot (8,400 m^{2}) non-public shopping and dining complex built in 2012. It operates for one week each year, during the tournament. Entry passes for the week cost $10,000 (up from $6,000) are sold only to corporations, and require Augusta National's approval; there is a 10-ticket limit per pass. As in the rest of the club, neither cell phones nor photography are allowed. The price includes free dining at Berckmans' five full-service restaurants, each of which can seat hundreds of guests: Augusta's (a seafood restaurant), Calamity Jane's, Ike's at the Pavilion, Isabella, and MacKenzie's Pub. Bathroom stalls are attended and cleaned after each use. There is a pro shop and four putting greens dubbed the "Putting Experience": three slightly smaller replicas of holes 7, 14, and 16; and a "composite course". BP customers can use an exclusive parking lot and entryway (Gate 9). The complex is located near hole 5.

Berckmans Place is named after Belgian Louis Mathieu Berckmans, whose family owned the land the club is built on from 1858 to 1910.

==== Concessions ====
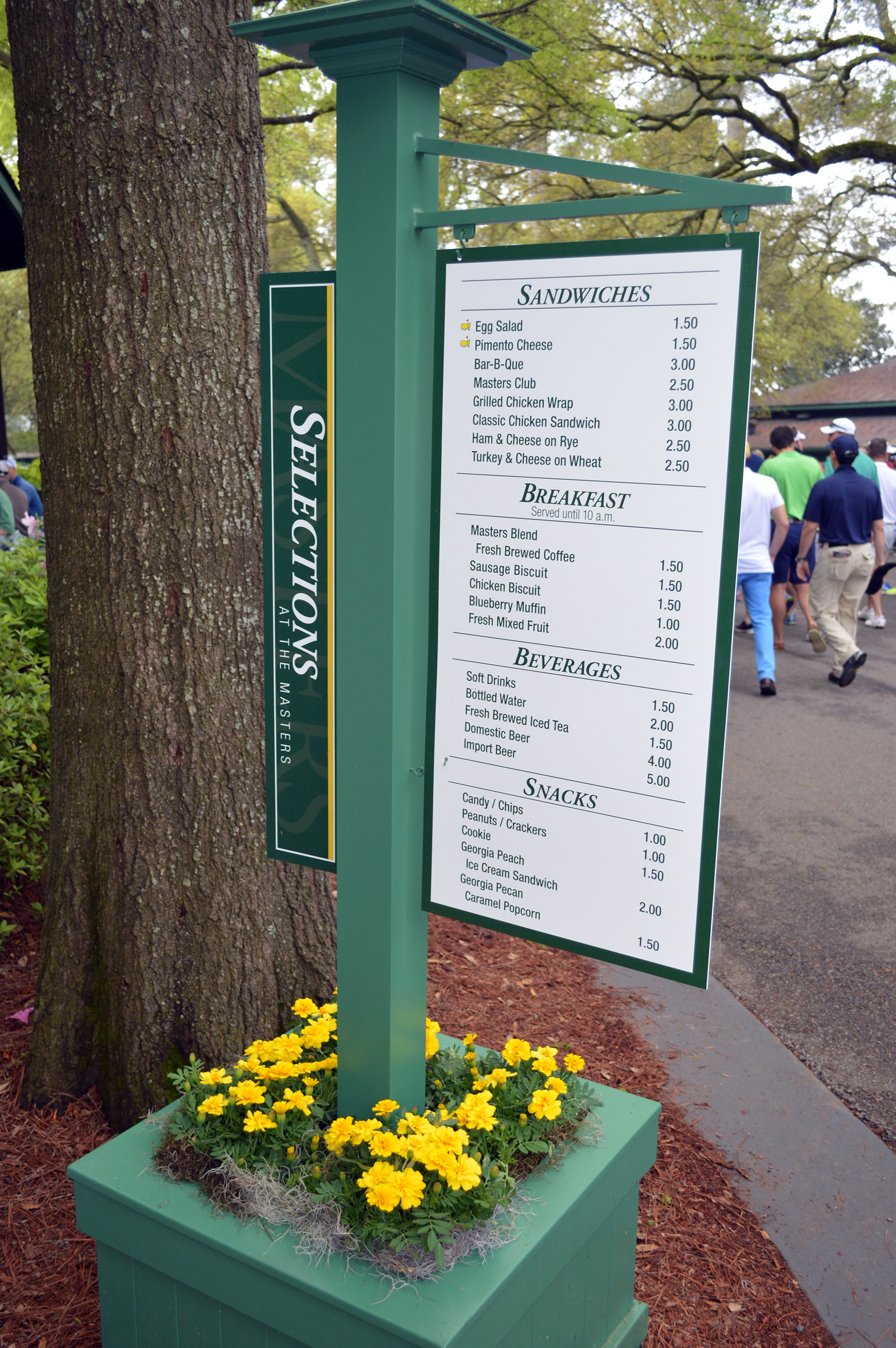
The food menu for attendees at the 2015 Masters

Pimento cheese sandwiches have a long history at the Masters. They have been served as a concession since the 1940s. Minor controversy ensued in 2013 when the club switched food suppliers for the Masters and the new supplier was unable to duplicate the recipe used by the previous supplier, resulting in a sandwich with a markedly different taste. Southern Living and Golf Digest called the sandwich "iconic" of the tournament. Sports Illustrated called the sandwich "legendary" and "more than a food option – it's a representation of the sport's history and its traditions".

The club introduced its own private label wheat ale beer called Crow's Nest in 2021, which is served in its own green cup and only sold during the Masters. The beer is not available during any other time of the year. The club's private-label cola is widely believed to be made by Coca-Cola.

Concessions at the Masters are renowned for their low prices compared to other sporting events in North America; the aforementioned pimento cheese sandwich is $1.50, no food item on the menu is more expensive than $3, and a pint of Crow's Nest sells for $6.

==== Map & Flag ====
Augusta National opened its own "hospitality experience" in 2024 called Map & Flag. Located across Washington Street from the main property, the venue is only accessible with a $17,000 week-long pass.

Map & Flag is operated by Endeavor-owned On Location Experiences.

==== Merchandise ====
Merchandise sold at the tournament has become a large business for Augusta National, bringing in an estimated $70 million in revenue. All items are only available in-person at the Masters, making the merchandise into a status symbol and creating a secondhand market.

Especially popular are the annual garden gnomes, first introduced in 2016 (then exclusive to Berckmans Place) and produced each year since with a new design (excluding 2017). Interest in the gnomes as collector's items skyrocketed after the COVID-19 pandemic; customers are limited to one gnome per person, as they resell on the secondary market for several times their retail value. Golf Digest reported that for the 2025 tournament, Augusta offered around 1,000 gnomes for sale each day, and some reporting has indicated that the gnomes may be discontinued after 2026.

Goodr manufactures sunglasses with a variety of Masters-exclusive designs that reference Augusta National. The Masters has also produced an annual collectable commemorative pin for each year's tournament since at least the 1990s, which included a line of pins themed to the course's holes sold from 2001 through 2018.

==== Ticketing ====
Although tickets (referred to as "badges") for the Masters are not expensive at face value compared with other high-level sporting events (as of 2026, $525 for a four-day pass), they are very difficult to come by. Masters tickets are considered the second-hardest to obtain in sports, trailing only the Super Bowl. Even the practice rounds can be difficult to gain entrance into. Practice rounds and daily tournament passes are sold in advance, through a selection process, only after receipt of an online application. All tickets are sold in advance and there are none sold at the gates. Additionally, Georgia state law prohibits tickets from being bought, sold, or handed off within a 2,700-foot (820 m) boundary around the club.

Since the first Masters, badges have displayed the ticket price, tournament dates, and ANGC logo. They were made from cardboard until 1953, when they switched to paper; all badges have been made of plastic since 1961. In 2017, the club began including a color bar encoding the ticket number printed on the front. Badges each contain an RFID chip.

Open applications for practice rounds and individual daily tournament tickets have to be made nearly a year in advance and the successful applicants are chosen by random selection. Series badges for the actual tournament, that is a badge valid for all four tournament rounds, are made available and sold only to individuals of a patrons list, which is closed. A waiting list for the patrons list was opened in 1972 and closed in 1978. It was reopened in 2000 and subsequently closed once again. Individuals who are on the patron list are given the recurring opportunity to purchase series badges each year for life. According to Augusta National, after the death of a badge holder, a series badge account is transferable only to a surviving spouse and no other family members.

In 2008, as part of their Junior Pass Program, the Masters also began allowing children (between the ages of 8 and 16) to enter on tournament days for free if they are accompanied by the patron who is the original applicant of his or her series badge. The Junior Pass Program does not apply to individual daily tournament tickets, only to series badge patrons.

The difficulty in acquiring Masters badges has made the tournament one of the largest events on the secondary resale ticket market. Since a majority of the badges for the Masters are made available to the same group of patrons each year, these perennial ticket holders sometimes decide to sell their badges through large ticket marketplaces or third party ticket brokers, although they do so at their own detriment as this action is strictly prohibited in the ticket purchase agreement and ticket policy; those caught are banned from future tournaments. Since 2025, ANGC has more strictly enforced its no-resale policy.

Augusta National has for decades made 100 series badges available to Fort Gordon, which holds a lottery for service members to buy tickets for a day.

==== Venue regulations and prohibited items ====
"I just don't think [cell phones are] appropriate. The noise is an irritation to not only the players, the dialing, the conversation; it's a distraction. And that's the way we have chosen to deal with it."

— Former Augusta National chairman Billy Payne about Masters Tournament and immersion

Patrons who have obtained a ticket to access Augusta National must comply with a strict policy regarding the use of electronic devices during the tournament. The organization clearly states that "the use of any device for phone calls, emails, text messaging, or to record and/or transmit voice, video or data is strictly prohibited," and that cameras are "strictly prohibited on Tournament days" but "are permitted for still photography and personal use only" on practice days, at the start of the competition week. Noise and music-producing devices (radios, TVs, speakers), flags, posters, and weapons are also forbidden. Breaking these rules may lead to ejection from the venue and permanent loss of tickets. Complimentary phones are available throughout the course for spectators needing to make a call. These policies were established to reduce distractions and encourage patrons to carpe diem, ensuring smooth play and calm on the course while upholding the tournament's etiquette, atmosphere, and tradition.

Parking is provided to spectators for free.

=== Post-tournament events ===
Augusta National holds a lottery for members of the press pool to play the course the Monday after the end of the Masters; the event is called the Monday Golf Outing.

== Format ==
The Masters is the first major championship of the year. Since 1948, its final round has been scheduled for the second Sunday of April, with several exceptions. It ended on the first Sunday four times (1952, 1957, 1958, 1959) and the 1979 and 1984 tournaments ended on April 15, the month's third Sunday. The first edition in 1934 was held in late March and the next ten were in early April, with only the 1942 event scheduled to end on the second Sunday. The 2020 event, postponed by the COVID-19 pandemic, was held from November 12 to 15, thus being the last major of the year.

Similar to the other majors, the tournament consists of four rounds at 18 holes each, Thursday through Sunday (when there are no delays). The Masters has a relatively small field of contenders when compared with other golf tournaments, so the competitors play in groups of three for the first two rounds (36 holes) and the field is not split to start on the 1st and 10th tees unless weather shortens the available playing time. The tournament is unique in that it is the only major tournament conducted by a private club rather than a national golf organization like the PGA.

Originally, the Masters was the only tournament to use two-man pairings during the first two rounds. It was also the only event to re-pair based on the leaderboard before Friday's round, as most tournaments only do this on the weekend. This practice ended in the early 2000s when the Masters switched to the more standard three-man groups and the groups are now kept intact on Friday, with players sharing the same playing partners in both of the first two rounds.

After 36 holes of play, a cut-off score is calculated to reduce the size of the field for the weekend rounds. In 2020, to "make the cut", players must be in the top 50 places (ties counting). Before 1957, there was no 36-hole cut and all of the invitees played four rounds, if desired. From 1957 to 1961, the top 40 scores (including ties) made the cut. From 1962 to 2012, it was the top 44 (and ties) or within 10 strokes of the lead. From 2013 to 2019, it was the top 50 (and ties) or within 10 strokes of the lead.

Following the cut, an additional 36 holes are played over the final two days. Should the fourth round fail to produce a winner, all players tied for the lead enter a sudden-death playoff. Play begins on the 18th hole, followed by the adjacent 10th, repeating until one player wins. Adopted in 1976, the sudden-death playoff was originally formatted to start on the first hole, but was not needed for the first three years. It was changed for 1979 to the inward (final) nine holes, starting at the tenth tee, where the television coverage began. First employed that same year, the Masters' first sudden-death playoff, won by Fuzzy Zoeller, ended on the 11th green. The current arrangement, beginning at the 18th tee, was amended for 2004 and first used the following year. Through 2017, the eleven sudden-death playoffs have yet to advance past the second extra hole. The Masters is the only major tournament that currently uses a sudden-death playoff, which is used on most professional tour tournaments. Earlier playoffs were 18 holes on the following day, except for the first in 1935, which was 36 holes (Gene Sarazen defeated Craig Wood); the last 18-hole playoff was in 1970 when Billy Casper defeated Gene Littler, and none of the full-round playoffs went to additional holes.

=== Planning ===
The Masters is planned by 24 committees made up of Augusta National members, which include:

- Beautification Committee
- Competition Committee
- Concession Committee
- Executive Committee
- Finance Committee
- Grounds Committee
- Litter Control Committee
- Local Operating Committee
- Media Committee
- Motion Picture Committee
- Pin Placement Committee
- Press Committee
- Rules Committee
- Tee Marking Committee
- Television Committee
- Tournament Improvements Committee

== Course ==
The golf course was formerly a plant nursery and each hole is named after the tree or shrub with which it has become associated.
The 11th, 12th, and 13th holes have been referred to as Amen Corner. The course layout in 2026:

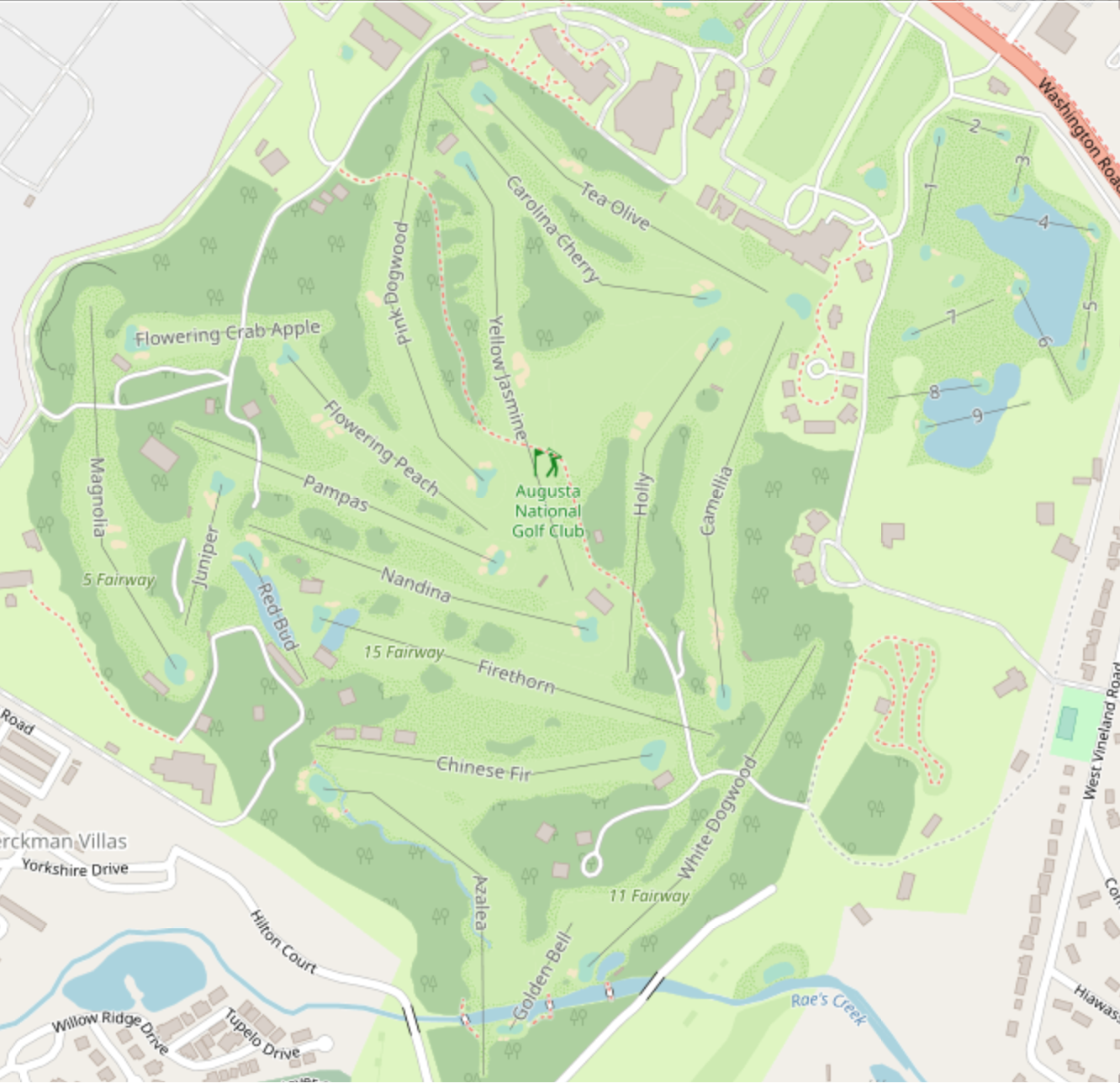
Layout of Augusta National Golf Club

Hole	Name	Yards	Par	Hole	Name	Yards	Par
1	Tea Olive	445	4	10	Camellia	495	4
2	Pink Dogwood	585	5	11	White Dogwood	520	4
3	Flowering Peach	350	4	12	Golden Bell	155	3
4	Flowering Crab Apple	240	3	13	Azalea	545	5
5	Magnolia	495	4	14	Chinese Fir	440	4
6	Juniper	180	3	15	Firethorn	550	5
7	Pampas	450	4	16	Redbud	170	3
8	Yellow Jasmine	570	5	17	Nandina	450	4
9	Carolina Cherry	460	4	18	Holly	465	4
Out		3,775	36	In		3,790	36
Source:				Total		7,565	72

Lengths of the course for the Masters at the start of each decade:

- 2020: 7,475 yards (6,835 m)
- 2010: 7,435 yards (6,799 m)
- 2000: 6,985 yards (6,387 m)
- 1990: 6,905 yards (6,314 m)
- 1980: 7,040 yards (6,437 m)
- 1970: 6,980 yards (6,383 m)
- 1960: 6,980 yards (6,383 m)
- 1950: 6,900 yards (6,309 m)
- 1940: 6,800 yards (6,218 m)

=== Course adjustments ===
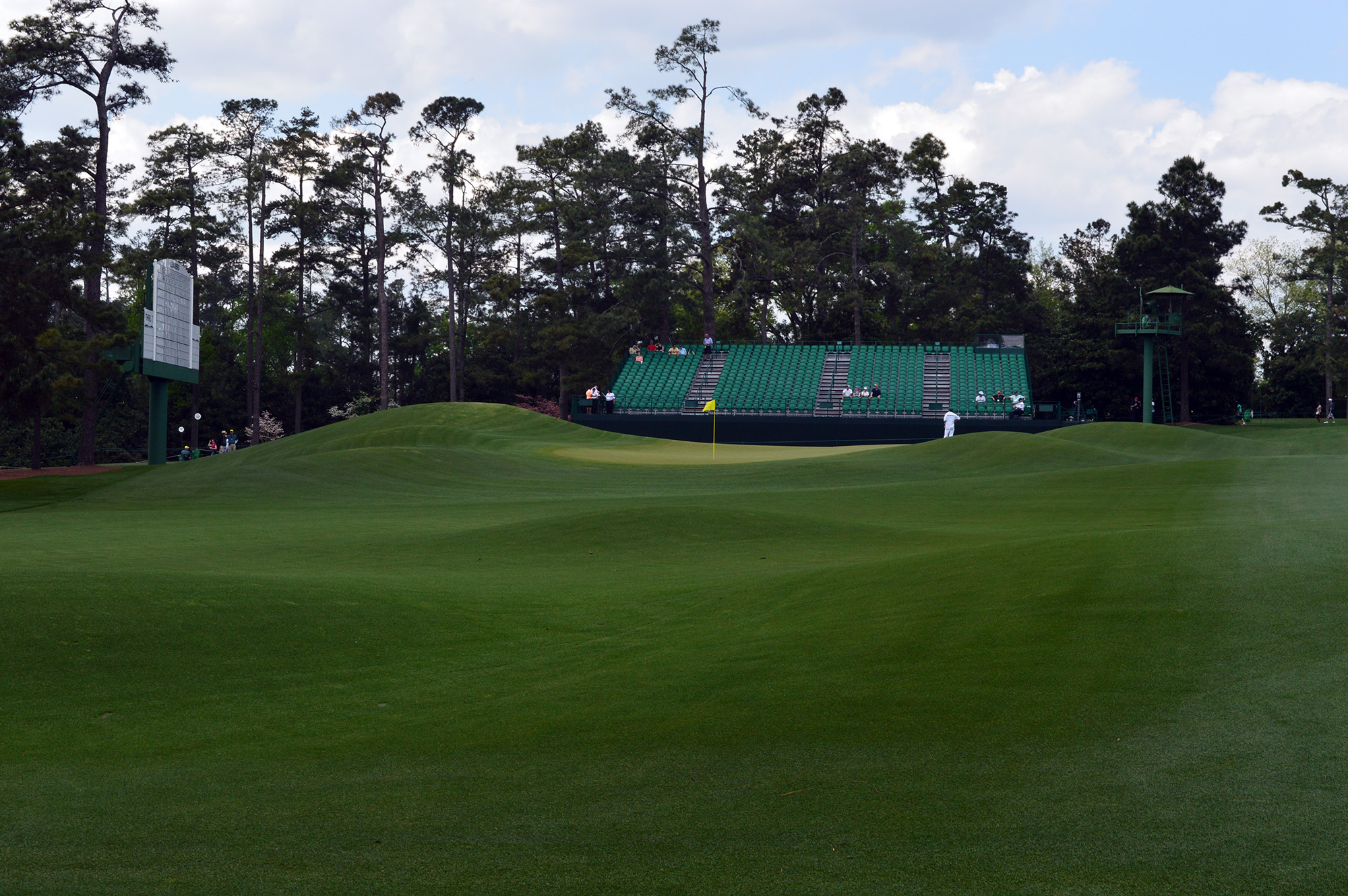
The course at Augusta National

As with many other courses, Augusta National's championship setup was lengthened in recent years. In 2001, the course measured 6,925 yards (6,332 m) and was extended to 7,270 yards (6,648 m) for 2002, and again in 2006 to 7,445 yards (6,808 m); 520 yards (475 m) longer than the 2001 course. The changes attracted many critics, including the most successful players in Masters history, Jack Nicklaus, Arnold Palmer, Gary Player and Tiger Woods. Woods claimed that the "shorter hitters are going to struggle". Augusta National chairman Hootie Johnson was unperturbed, stating, "We are comfortable with what we are doing with the golf course." After a practice round, Gary Player defended the changes, saying, "There have been a lot of criticisms, but I think unjustly so, now I've played it ... The guys are basically having to hit the same second shots that Jack Nicklaus had to hit (in his prime)".

The first hole was shortened by 10 yards (9 m) for the 2009 Masters Tournament. For the 2019 Masters Tournament, the fifth hole was lengthened by 40 yards (37 m) from 455 yards to 495 yards, with two new gaping bunkers on the left side of the fairway. For the 2026 Masters Tournament, the 17th hole was lengthened by 10 yards (9 m) to 450 yards (411 m), bringing the course's total length to 7,565 yards (6,917 m).

Originally, the grass on the putting greens was wide-bladed Bermuda. The greens lost speed, especially during the late 1970s, after the introduction of a healthier strain of narrow-bladed Bermuda, which thrived and grew thicker. In 1978, the greens on the Par 3 course were reconstructed with bentgrass, a narrow-bladed species that could be mowed shorter, eliminating grain. After this test run, the greens on the main course were replaced with bentgrass in time for the 1981 Masters. The bentgrass resulted in significantly faster putting surfaces, which has required a reduction in some of the contours of the greens over time.

Just before the 1975 tournament, the common beige sand in the bunkers was replaced with the now-signature white feldspar. It is a quartz derivative of the mining of feldspar and is shipped in from North Carolina.

== Field ==
The Masters has the smallest field of the major championships, with 85–100 players. Unlike other majors, there are no alternates or qualifying tournaments. It is an invitational event, with invitations largely issued on an automatic basis to players who meet published criteria. The top 50 players in the Official World Golf Ranking are all invited.

Past champions are always eligible, but since 2002 the Augusta National Golf Club has discouraged them from continuing to participate at an advanced age. Some will later become honorary starters.

=== Invitation categories (from 2026) ===
See footnote.
Note: Categories 7–12 are honored only if the participants maintain their amateur status prior to the tournament.

1. Masters Tournament Champions (lifetime)
2. U.S. Open champions (five years)
3. The Open champions (five years)
4. PGA champions (five years)
5. Winners of the Players Championship (three years)
6. Current Olympic Gold Medalist (one year)
7. Current U.S. Amateur champion and runner-up
8. Current British Amateur champion
9. Current Asia-Pacific Amateur champion
10. Current Latin America Amateur champion
11. Current U.S. Mid-Amateur champion
12. Current NCAA Division I individual champion
13. The first 12 players, including ties, in the previous year's Masters Tournament
14. The first 4 players, including ties, in the previous year's U.S. Open
15. The first 4 players, including ties, in the previous year's Open Championship
16. The first 4 players, including ties, in the previous year's PGA Championship
17. Winners of PGA Tour events that award at least a full-point allocation for the FedEx Cup, from one Masters Tournament to the next
18. Those qualifying and eligible for the previous year's season-ending Tour Championship (top 30 in FedEx Cup prior to tournament)
19. Winners of the most recent editions of the Scottish Open, Spanish Open, South African Open, Hong Kong Open, Australian Open, and Japan Open (one year each)
20. The 50 leaders on the final Official World Golf Ranking for the previous calendar year
21. The 50 leaders on the Official World Golf Ranking published during the week prior to the current Masters Tournament

Most of the top current players will meet the criteria of multiple categories for invitation. The Masters Committee, at its discretion, can also invite any golfer not otherwise qualified, although in practice these invitations are mostly reserved for international players.

=== Changes since 2014 ===
Changes for the 2014 tournament include invitations now being awarded to the autumn events in the PGA Tour, which now begin the wraparound season, tightening of qualifications (top 12 plus ties from the Masters, top 4 from the U.S. Open, Open Championship, and PGA Championship), and the top 30 on the PGA Tour now referencing the season-ending points before the Tour Championship, not the former annual money list. The 2015 Masters added the winner of the newly established Latin America Amateur Championship, which effectively replaced the exemption for the U.S. Amateur Public Links, which ended after the 2014 tournament. (The final Public Links champion played in the 2015 Masters.)

Prior to the start of the 2023 Masters Tournament, several changes to the criteria were announced to come into effect from 2024. An additional criterion was added for amateur golfers, for the reigning individual champion of the NCAA Division I Men's Golf Championship, and PGA Tour criteria were modified to account for scheduling changes (previously only regular season and playoff events were included) and to clarify that players must remain eligible for the Tour Championship.

== Most wins ==
The first winner of the Masters Tournament was Horton Smith in 1934, and he repeated in 1936. The player with the most Masters victories is Jack Nicklaus, who won six times between 1963 and 1986. Tiger Woods has five wins, followed by Arnold Palmer with four, and Jimmy Demaret, Gary Player, Sam Snead, Nick Faldo, and Phil Mickelson have three titles to their name. Player was the tournament's first overseas winner with his first victory in 1961. Two-time champions include Byron Nelson, Ben Hogan, Tom Watson, Seve Ballesteros, Bernhard Langer, Ben Crenshaw, José María Olazábal, Bubba Watson, Scottie Scheffler, and Rory McIlroy.

== Winners ==
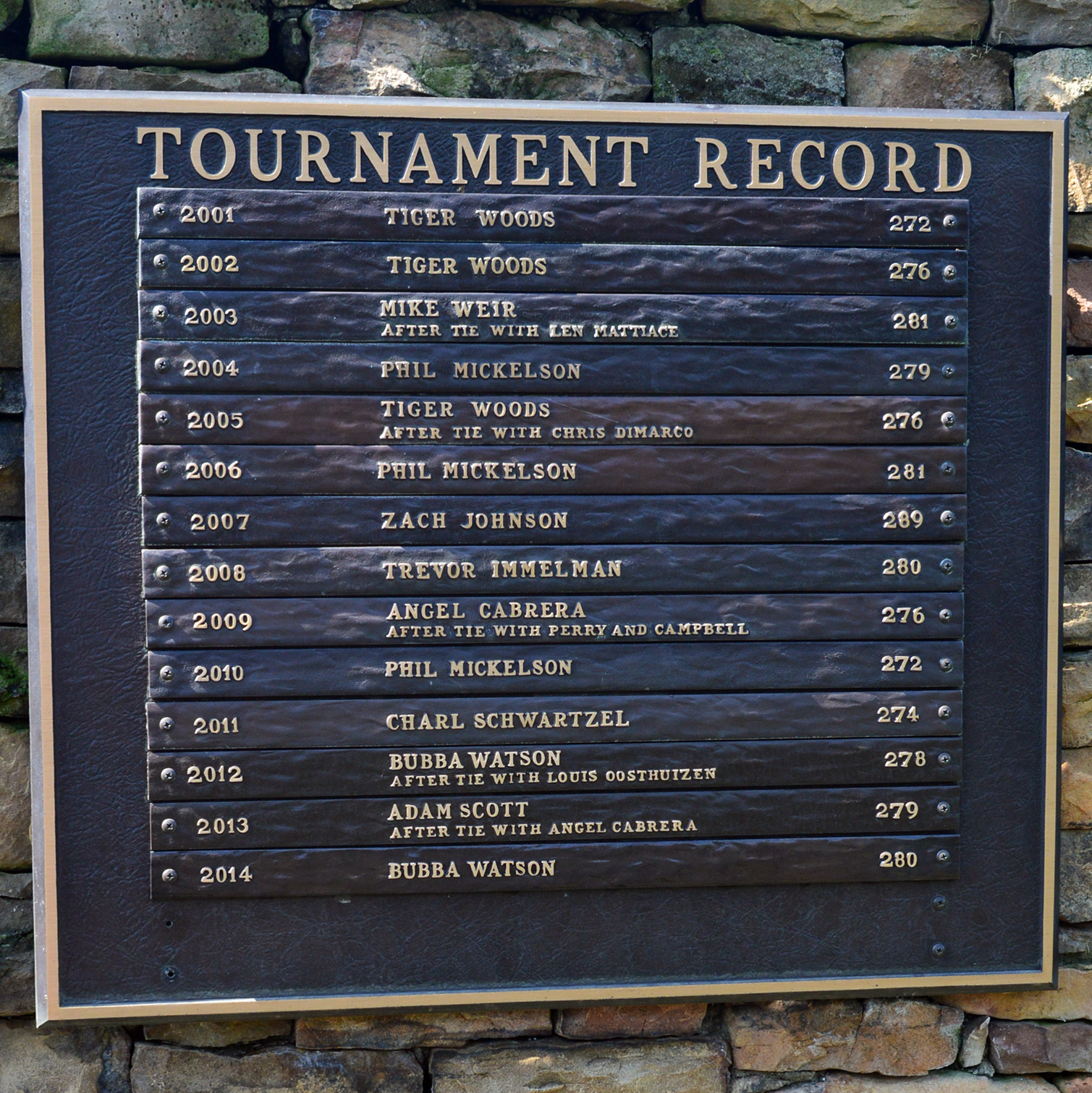
Plaque at Augusta National listing winners of the Masters, pictured in 2015

Year	Winner	Score	To par	Margin of victory	Runner(s)-up	Winner's share ($)
2026	(Northern Ireland) Rory McIlroy (2)	276	−12	1 stroke	(United States) Scottie Scheffler	4,500,000
2025	(Northern Ireland) Rory McIlroy	277	−11	Playoff	(England) Justin Rose	4,200,000
2024	(United States) Scottie Scheffler (2)	277	−11	4 strokes	(Sweden) Ludvig Åberg	3,600,000
2023	(Spain) Jon Rahm	276	−12	4 strokes	(United States) Brooks Koepka (United States) Phil Mickelson	3,240,000
2022	(United States) Scottie Scheffler	278	−10	3 strokes	(Northern Ireland) Rory McIlroy	2,700,000
2021	(Japan) Hideki Matsuyama	278	−10	1 stroke	(United States) Will Zalatoris	2,070,000
2020	(United States) Dustin Johnson	268	−20	5 strokes	(South Korea) Im Sung-jae (Australia) Cameron Smith	2,070,000
2019	(United States) Tiger Woods (5)	275	−13	1 stroke	(United States) Dustin Johnson (United States) Brooks Koepka (United States) Xander Schauffele	2,070,000
2018	(United States) Patrick Reed	273	−15	1 stroke	(United States) Rickie Fowler	1,980,000
2017	(Spain) Sergio García	279	−9	Playoff	(England) Justin Rose	1,980,000
2016	(England) Danny Willett	283	−5	3 strokes	(United States) Jordan Spieth (England) Lee Westwood	1,800,000
2015	(United States) Jordan Spieth	270	−18	4 strokes	(United States) Phil Mickelson (England) Justin Rose	1,800,000
2014	(United States) Bubba Watson (2)	280	−8	3 strokes	(Sweden) Jonas Blixt (United States) Jordan Spieth	1,620,000
2013	(Australia) Adam Scott	279	−9	Playoff	(Argentina) Ángel Cabrera	1,440,000
2012	(United States) Bubba Watson	278	−10	Playoff	(South Africa) Louis Oosthuizen	1,440,000
2011	(South Africa) Charl Schwartzel	274	−14	2 strokes	(Australia) Jason Day (Australia) Adam Scott	1,440,000
2010	(United States) Phil Mickelson (3)	272	−16	3 strokes	(England) Lee Westwood	1,350,000
2009	(Argentina) Ángel Cabrera	276	−12	Playoff	(United States) Kenny Perry (United States) Chad Campbell	1,350,000
2008	(South Africa) Trevor Immelman	280	−8	3 strokes	(United States) Tiger Woods	1,350,000
2007	(United States) Zach Johnson	289	+1	2 strokes	(South Africa) Retief Goosen (South Africa) Rory Sabbatini (United States) Tiger Woods	1,305,000
2006	(United States) Phil Mickelson (2)	281	−7	2 strokes	(South Africa) Tim Clark	1,260,000
2005	(United States) Tiger Woods (4)	276	−12	Playoff	(United States) Chris DiMarco	1,260,000
2004	(United States) Phil Mickelson	279	−9	1 stroke	(South Africa) Ernie Els	1,117,000
2003	(Canada) Mike Weir	281	−7	Playoff	(United States) Len Mattiace	1,080,000
2002	(United States) Tiger Woods (3)	276	−12	3 strokes	(South Africa) Retief Goosen	1,008,000
2001	(United States) Tiger Woods (2)	272	−16	2 strokes	(United States) David Duval	1,008,000
2000	(Fiji) Vijay Singh	278	−10	3 strokes	(South Africa) Ernie Els	828,000
1999	(Spain) José María Olazábal (2)	280	−8	2 strokes	(United States) Davis Love III	720,000
1998	(United States) Mark O'Meara	279	−9	1 stroke	(United States) Fred Couples (United States) David Duval	576,000
1997	(United States) Tiger Woods	270	−18	12 strokes	(United States) Tom Kite	486,000
1996	(England) Nick Faldo (3)	276	−12	5 strokes	(Australia) Greg Norman	450,000
1995	(United States) Ben Crenshaw (2)	274	−14	1 stroke	(United States) Davis Love III	396,000
1994	(Spain) José María Olazábal	279	−9	2 strokes	(United States) Tom Lehman	360,000
1993	(Germany) Bernhard Langer (2)	277	−11	4 strokes	(United States) Chip Beck	306,000
1992	(United States) Fred Couples	275	−13	2 strokes	(United States) Raymond Floyd	270,000
1991	(Wales) Ian Woosnam	277	−11	1 stroke	(Spain) José María Olazábal	243,000
1990	(England) Nick Faldo (2)	278	−10	Playoff	(United States) Raymond Floyd	225,000
1989	(England) Nick Faldo	283	−5	Playoff	(United States) Scott Hoch	200,000
1988	(Scotland) Sandy Lyle	281	−7	1 stroke	(United States) Mark Calcavecchia	183,800
1987	(United States) Larry Mize	285	−3	Playoff	(Spain) Seve Ballesteros (Australia) Greg Norman	162,000
1986	(United States) Jack Nicklaus (6)	279	−9	1 stroke	(United States) Tom Kite (Australia) Greg Norman	144,000
1985	(West Germany) Bernhard Langer	282	−6	2 strokes	(Spain) Seve Ballesteros (United States) Raymond Floyd (United States) Curtis Strange	126,000
1984	(United States) Ben Crenshaw	277	−11	2 strokes	(United States) Tom Watson	108,000
1983	(Spain) Seve Ballesteros (2)	280	−8	4 strokes	(United States) Ben Crenshaw (United States) Tom Kite	90,000
1982	(United States) Craig Stadler	284	−4	Playoff	(United States) Dan Pohl	64,000
1981	(United States) Tom Watson (2)	280	−8	2 strokes	(United States) Johnny Miller (United States) Jack Nicklaus	60,000
1980	(Spain) Seve Ballesteros	275	−13	4 strokes	(United States) Gibby Gilbert (Australia) Jack Newton	55,000
1979	(United States) Fuzzy Zoeller	280	−8	Playoff	(United States) Ed Sneed (United States) Tom Watson	50,000
1978	(South Africa) Gary Player (3)	277	−11	1 stroke	(United States) Rod Funseth (United States) Hubert Green (United States) Tom Watson	45,000
1977	(United States) Tom Watson	276	−12	2 strokes	(United States) Jack Nicklaus	40,000
1976	(United States) Raymond Floyd	271	−17	8 strokes	(United States) Ben Crenshaw	40,000
1975	(United States) Jack Nicklaus (5)	276	−12	1 stroke	(United States) Johnny Miller (United States) Tom Weiskopf	40,000
1974	(South Africa) Gary Player (2)	278	−10	2 strokes	(United States) Dave Stockton (United States) Tom Weiskopf	35,000
1973	(United States) Tommy Aaron	283	−5	1 stroke	(United States) J. C. Snead	30,000
1972	(United States) Jack Nicklaus (4)	286	−2	3 strokes	(Australia) Bruce Crampton (United States) Bobby Mitchell (United States) Tom Weiskopf	25,000
1971	(United States) Charles Coody	279	−9	2 strokes	(United States) Johnny Miller (United States) Jack Nicklaus	25,000
1970	(United States) Billy Casper	279	−9	Playoff	(United States) Gene Littler	25,000
1969	(United States) George Archer	281	−7	1 stroke	(United States) Billy Casper (Canada) George Knudson (United States) Tom Weiskopf	20,000
1968	(United States) Bob Goalby	277	−11	1 stroke	(Argentina) Roberto De Vicenzo	20,000
1967	(United States) Gay Brewer	280	−8	1 stroke	(United States) Bobby Nichols	20,000
1966	(United States) Jack Nicklaus (3)	288	E	Playoff	(United States) Tommy Jacobs (2nd) (United States) Gay Brewer (3rd)	20,000
1965	(United States) Jack Nicklaus (2)	271	−17	9 strokes	(United States) Arnold Palmer (South Africa) Gary Player	20,000
1964	(United States) Arnold Palmer (4)	276	−12	6 strokes	(United States) Dave Marr (United States) Jack Nicklaus	20,000
1963	(United States) Jack Nicklaus	286	−2	1 stroke	(United States) Tony Lema	20,000
1962	(United States) Arnold Palmer (3)	280	−8	Playoff	(South Africa) Gary Player (2nd) (United States) Dow Finsterwald (3rd)	20,000
1961	(South Africa) Gary Player	280	−8	1 stroke	(United States) Charles Coe (a) (United States) Arnold Palmer	20,000
1960	(United States) Arnold Palmer (2)	282	−6	1 stroke	(United States) Ken Venturi	17,500
1959	(United States) Art Wall Jr.	284	−4	1 stroke	(United States) Cary Middlecoff	15,000
1958	(United States) Arnold Palmer	284	−4	1 stroke	(United States) Doug Ford (United States) Fred Hawkins	11,250
1957	(United States) Doug Ford	283	−5	3 strokes	(United States) Sam Snead	8,750
1956	(United States) Jack Burke Jr.	289	+1	1 stroke	(United States) Ken Venturi (a)	6,000
1955	(United States) Cary Middlecoff	279	−9	7 strokes	(United States) Ben Hogan	5,000
1954	(United States) Sam Snead (3)	289	+1	Playoff	(United States) Ben Hogan	5,000
1953	(United States) Ben Hogan (2)	274	−14	5 strokes	(United States) Ed Oliver	4,000
1952	(United States) Sam Snead (2)	286	−2	4 strokes	(United States) Jack Burke Jr.	4,000
1951	(United States) Ben Hogan	280	−8	2 strokes	(United States) Skee Riegel	3,000
1950	(United States) Jimmy Demaret (3)	283	−5	2 strokes	(Australia) Jim Ferrier	2,400
1949	(United States) Sam Snead	282	−6	3 strokes	(United States) Johnny Bulla (United States) Lloyd Mangrum	2,750
1948	(United States) Claude Harmon	279	−9	5 strokes	(United States) Cary Middlecoff	2,500
1947	(United States) Jimmy Demaret (2)	281	−7	2 strokes	(United States) Byron Nelson (United States) Frank Stranahan (a)	2,500
1946	(United States) Herman Keiser	282	−6	1 stroke	(United States) Ben Hogan	2,500
1943–45: Cancelled due to World War II
1942	(United States) Byron Nelson (2)	280	−8	Playoff	(United States) Ben Hogan	1,500
1941	(United States) Craig Wood	280	−8	3 strokes	(United States) Byron Nelson	1,500
1940	(United States) Jimmy Demaret	280	−8	4 strokes	(United States) Lloyd Mangrum	1,500
1939	(United States) Ralph Guldahl	279	−9	1 stroke	(United States) Sam Snead	1,500
1938	(United States) Henry Picard	285	−3	2 strokes	(England) Harry Cooper (United States) Ralph Guldahl	1,500
1937	(United States) Byron Nelson	283	−5	2 strokes	(United States) Ralph Guldahl	1,500
1936	(United States) Horton Smith (2)	285	−3	1 stroke	(England) Harry Cooper	1,500
1935	(United States) Gene Sarazen	282	−6	Playoff	(United States) Craig Wood	1,500
1934	(United States) Horton Smith	284	−4	2 strokes	(United States) Craig Wood	1,500

- Record for score, to par, and margin of victory
- In the "Runner(s)-up" column, the names are sorted alphabetically, based on the last name of that year's runner(s)-up.
- The sudden-death format was adopted in 1976, first used in 1979, and revised in 2004.
  - None of the 11 sudden-death playoffs has advanced past the second hole; four were decided at the first hole, seven at the second.
- Playoffs prior to 1976 were full 18-hole rounds, except for 1935, which was 36 holes.
  - None of the six full-round playoffs were tied at the end of the round; the closest margin was one stroke in 1942 and 1954.
  - The 1962 playoff included three players: Arnold Palmer (68), Gary Player (71), and Dow Finsterwald (77).
  - The 1966 playoff included three players: Jack Nicklaus (70), Tommy Jacobs (72), and Gay Brewer (78).

== Low amateurs ==
In 1952, the Masters began presenting an award, known as the Silver Cup, to the lowest-scoring amateur to make the cut. In 1954 they began presenting an amateur silver medal to the low amateur runner-up. There have been seven players to win low amateur and then go on to win the Masters as a professional. These players are Cary Middlecoff, Jack Nicklaus, Ben Crenshaw, Phil Mickelson, Tiger Woods, Sergio García, and Hideki Matsuyama.

Year	Low amateur	To par	Place
1934	(United States) Charlie Yates	+9	T21
1935	(United States) Lawson Little	E	6
1936	(United States) Johnny Dawson	+6	T9
1937	(United States) Charlie Yates (2)	+13	T26
1938	(United States) Tommy Suffern Tailer	+10	T18
1939	(United States) Chick Harbert (United States) Charlie Yates (3)	+8	T18
1940	(United States) Charlie Yates (4)	+5	T17
1941	(United States) Dick Chapman	+9	T19
1942	(United States) Bud Ward (United States) Charlie Yates (5)	+16	T28
1943–1945	Cancelled due to World War II		
1946	(United States) Cary Middlecoff	+5	T12
1947	(United States) Frank Stranahan	−5	T2
1948	(United States) Skee Riegel	+5	T13
1949	(United States) Charles Coe (United States) Johnny Dawson (2)	+7	T16
1950	(United States) Frank Stranahan (2)	+9	T14
1951	(United States) Charles Coe (2)	+5	T12
1952	(United States) Chuck Kocsis	+9	T14
1953	(United States) Frank Stranahan (3) (United States) Harvie Ward	+3	T14
1954	(United States) Billy Joe Patton	+2	3
1955	(United States) Harvie Ward (2)	+2	T8
1956	(United States) Ken Venturi	+2	2
1957	(United States) Harvie Ward (3)	E	4
1958	(United States) Billy Joe Patton (2)	E	8
1959	(United States) Charles Coe (3)	E	6
1960	(United States) Jack Nicklaus (United States) Billy Joe Patton (3)	+5	T13
1961	(United States) Charles Coe (4)	−7	T2
1962	(United States) Charles Coe (5)	E	T9
1963	(United States) Labron Harris Jr.	+10	T32
1964	(United States) Deane Beman (Canada) Gary Cowan	+3	T25
1965	(United States) Downing Gray	+6	T31
1966	(United States) Jimmy Grant	+11	T28
1967	(United States) Downing Gray (2)	+9	T36
1968	(United States) Vinny Giles	E	T22
1969	(United States) Bruce Fleisher	+12	44
1970	(United States) Charles Coe (6)	+4	T23
1971	(United States) Steve Melnyk	+4	T24
1972	(United States) Ben Crenshaw	+7	T19
1973	(United States) Ben Crenshaw (2)	+7	T24
1974	None made the cut		
1975	(United States) George Burns	+4	T30
1976	(United States) Curtis Strange	+3	T15
1977	(United States) Bill Sander	+11	49
1978	(United States) Lindy Miller	−2	T16
1979	(United States) Bobby Clampett	+2	T23
1980	(United States) Jay Sigel	+1	T26
1981	(United States) Jay Sigel (2)	+6	T35
1982	(United States) Jodie Mudd	+6	T20
1983	(United States) Jim Hallet	+9	T40
1984	(United States) Rick Fehr	E	T25
1985	(United States) Sam Randolph	+2	T18
1986	(United States) Sam Randolph (2)	+5	T36
1987	(United States) Bob Lewis	+21	54
1988	(United States) Jay Sigel (3)	+12	T39
1989	None made the cut		
1990	(United States) Chris Patton	+9	T39
1991	(United States) Phil Mickelson	+2	T46
1992	(South Africa) Manny Zerman	+6	T59
1993	None made the cut		
1994	(United States) John Harris	+17	T50
1995	(United States) Tiger Woods	+5	T41
1996	None made the cut		
1997	None made the cut		
1998	(United States) Matt Kuchar	E	T21
1999	(Spain) Sergio García	+7	T38
2000	(United States) David Gossett	+15	T54
2001	None made the cut		
2002	None made the cut		
2003	(United States) Ricky Barnes	+3	21
2004	(United States) Casey Wittenberg	E	T13
2005	(United States) Ryan Moore	−1	T13
2006	None made the cut		
2007	None made the cut		
2008	None made the cut		
2009	None made the cut		
2010	(Italy) Matteo Manassero	+4	T36
2011	(Japan) Hideki Matsuyama	−1	T27
2012	(United States) Patrick Cantlay	+7	T47
2013	(China) Guan Tianlang	+12	58
2014	(Australia) Oliver Goss	+10	49
2015	None made the cut		
2016	(United States) Bryson DeChambeau	+5	T21
2017	(United States) Stewart Hagestad	+6	T36
2018	(United States) Doug Ghim	+8	T50
2019	(Norway) Viktor Hovland	−3	T32
2020	(United States) Andy Ogletree	−2	T34
2021	None made the cut		
2022	None made the cut		
2023	(United States) Sam Bennett	−2	T16
2024	(United States) Neal Shipley	+12	T53
2025	None made the cut		
2026	None made the cut		

- Records for to par and place

== Records ==
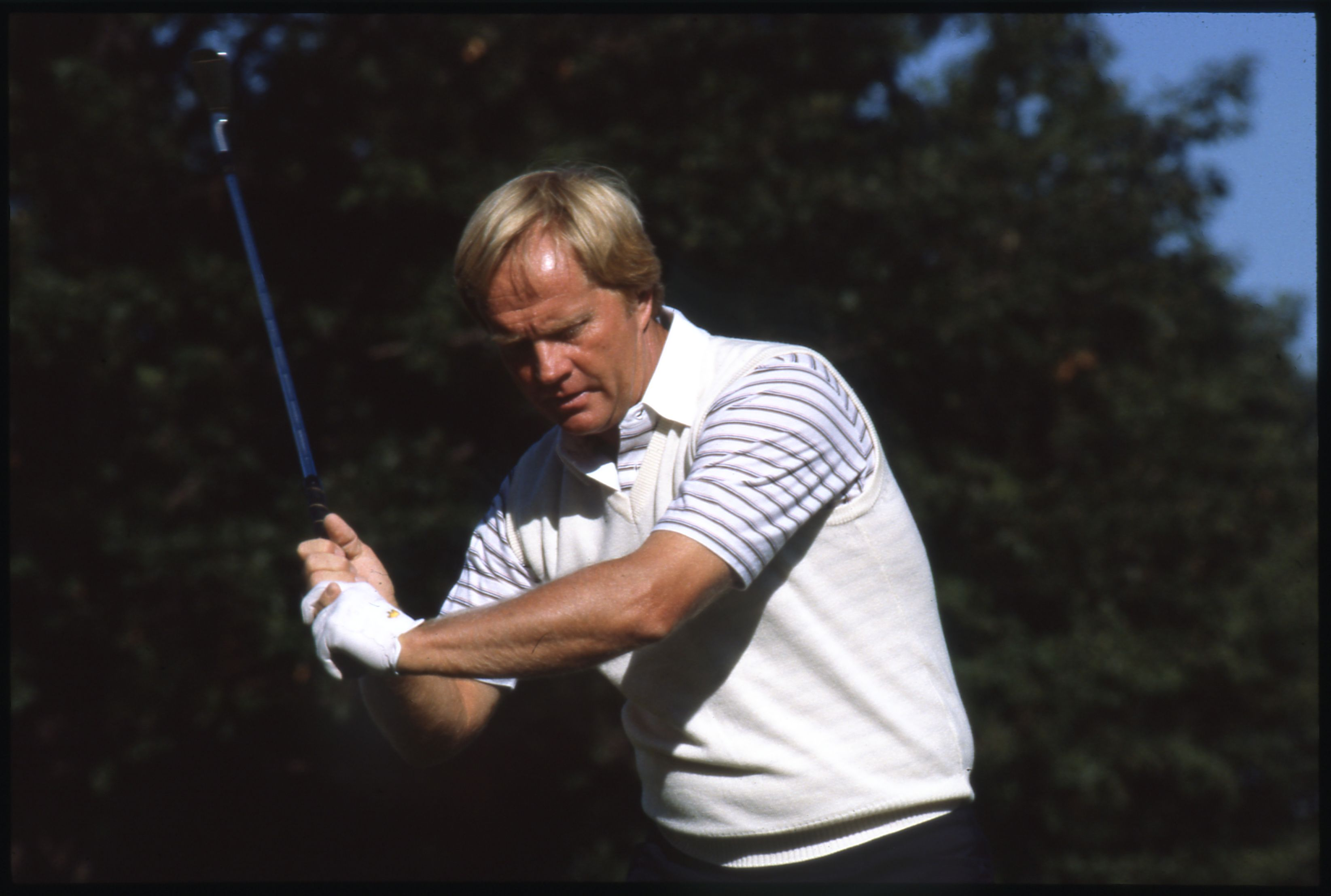
Jack Nicklaus has won the most Masters, with six wins

Jack Nicklaus has won the most Masters (six) and was 46 years, 82 days old when he won in 1986, making him the oldest winner of the Masters. Nicklaus is the record holder for the most top tens, with 22, and the most cuts made, with 37. The youngest winner of the Masters is Tiger Woods, who was 21 years, 104 days old when he won in 1997. In that year, Woods also broke the records for the widest winning margin (12 strokes), and the lowest winning score, with 270 (−18). Jordan Spieth tied his score record in 2015. Dustin Johnson broke the record in 2020 with a 268 (−20).

In 2013, Guan Tianlang became the youngest player to compete in the Masters, at age 14 years, 168 days on the opening day of the tournament; the following day, he became the youngest to make the cut at the Masters or any men's major championship.

Justin Rose holds the record for the most times having led the tournament field after the first round, having done it 5 times. These were achieved in 2004, 2007, 2008, 2021 and 2025.

In 2020, Australian Cameron Smith became the first golfer in Masters history to shoot all four rounds in the 60s (67, 68, 69, 69), finishing at 15 under par, en route to a tie for second-place finish with Sungjae Im.

Gary Player holds the record for most appearances, with 52. Tiger Woods holds the record for consecutive cuts made with 24 between 1997 and 2024; he did not compete in 2014, 2016, 2017, and 2021. In 2023, Fred Couples became the oldest player to make the cut, doing so at age 63 years, 186 days.

Nick Price and Greg Norman share the course record of 63, with their rounds coming in 1986 and 1996 respectively.

The highest winning score of 289 (+1) has occurred three times: Sam Snead in 1954, Jack Burke Jr. in 1956, and Zach Johnson in 2007. Anthony Kim holds the record for most birdies in a round with 11 in 2009 during his second round.

There have been only four double eagles carded in the history of the Masters; the latest was by a contender in the fourth round in 2012. In the penultimate pairing with eventual champion Bubba Watson, Louis Oosthuizen's 260-yard (238 m) downhill 4 iron from the fairway made the left side of the green at the par-5 second hole, called Pink Dogwood, rolled downhill, and in. The other two occurrences of this feat after Sarazen's double eagle on the course's Fire Thorn hole in 1935: Bruce Devlin made double eagle from 248 yards (227 m) out with a 4-wood at the eighth hole (Yellow Jasmine) in the first round in 1967, while Jeff Maggert hit a 3-iron 222 yards (203 m) at the 13th hole (Azalea) in the fourth round in 1994.

Three players share the record for most runner-up finishes with four – Ben Hogan (1942, 1946, 1954, 1955), Tom Weiskopf (1969, 1972, 1974, 1975), and Jack Nicklaus (1964, 1971, 1977, 1981). Nicklaus and Tiger Woods are the only golfers to have won the Masters in three separate decades.

The highest official score in a round was 95 by Charles Kunkle in 1956 and the highest unofficial score was 106 by Billy Casper in 2005 (he refused to hand in his scorecard to avoid holding the record).

== Broadcasting ==
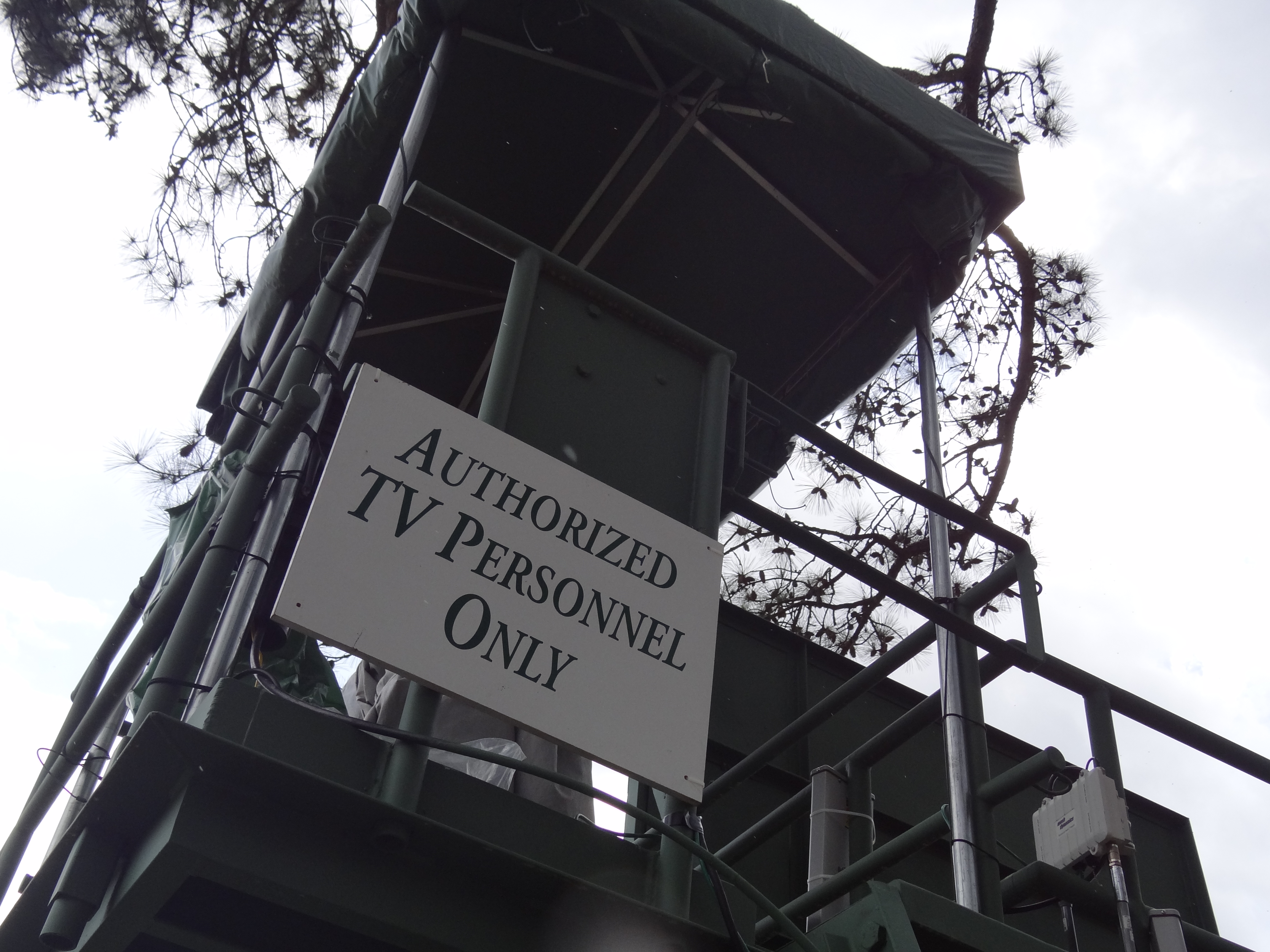
A sign at the Masters indicating an area for broadcast workers

=== United States television ===
Network	Years of broadcast
CBS (Paramount+)	1956–present
USA Network	1982–2007
ESPN (ESPN+)	2008–present
Amazon Prime Video	2026–present

NBC acquired the radio rights to the Masters from CBS in the 1940s, which also included television coverage, but never opted to televise the tournament. After years of pressure from Clifford Roberts to air the Masters on TV, NBC instead decided not to renew its contract. CBS then picked up the Masters again and broadcast the 1956 Masters Tournament on TV to 10 million viewers.

CBS has televised the Masters in the United States every year since 1956, when it used six cameras and covered only the final four holes. Tournament coverage of the first eight holes did not begin until 1993 because of resistance from the tournament organizers, but by 2006, more than 50 cameras were used. Chairman Jack Stephens felt that the back nine was always more "compelling", increased coverage would increase the need for sponsorship spending, and that broadcasting the front nine of the course on television would cut down on attendance and television viewership for the tournament. USA Network added first- and second-round coverage in 1982. In 2008, ESPN replaced USA as broadcaster of early-round coverage. These broadcasts use the CBS Sports production staff and commentators, but with ESPN personality Scott Van Pelt (succeeding Mike Tirico, who replaced Bill Macatee's similar role under USA Network) as studio host, as well as Curtis Strange as studio analyst. CBS carries two 15-minute highlight programs in late night covering the first and second rounds, which airs after their affiliates' late night local newscasts.

In 2005, CBS broadcast the tournament with high-definition fixed and handheld wired cameras, as well as standard-definition wireless handheld cameras. In 2006, a webcast called "Amen Corner Live" began providing coverage of all players passing through holes 11, 12, and 13 through all four rounds. This was the first full tournament multi-hole webcast from a major championship. In 2007, CBS added "Masters Extra," an extra hour of full-field bonus coverage daily on the internet, preceding the television broadcasts. In 2008, CBS added full coverage of holes 15 and 16 live on the web. In 2011, "Masters Extra" was dropped after officials gave ESPN an extra hour each day on Thursday and Friday. In 2016, the Amen Corner feed was broadcast in 4K ultra high definition exclusively on DirecTV—as one of the first live U.S. sports telecasts in the format. A second channel of 4K coverage covering holes 15 and 16 was added in 2017, and this coverage was produced with high-dynamic-range (HDR) color in 2018. In 2025, Paramount+ began streaming two-hour blocks of third- and final-round coverage preceding CBS television coverage. In 2026, Amazon Prime Video similarly began streaming two-hour blocks of early-round coverage preceding ESPN's television coverage.

While Augusta National Golf Club has consistently chosen CBS as its U.S. broadcast partner, it has done so in successive one-year contracts. Former CBS Sports president Neal Pilson stated that their relationship had gotten to the point where the contracts could be negotiated in just hours. Due to the lack of long-term contractual security, as well as the club's limited dependence on broadcast rights fees (owing to its affluent membership), it is widely held that CBS allows Augusta National greater control over the content of the broadcast, or at least performs some form of self-censorship, in order to maintain future rights. The club has insisted it does not make any demands with respect to the content of the broadcast. Despite this, announcers who have been deemed not to have acted with the decorum expected by the club have been removed, notably Jack Whitaker and Gary McCord, and there also tends to be a lack of discussion of any controversy involving Augusta National, such as the 2003 Martha Burk protests.

The coverage itself carries a more formal style than other golf telecasts; announcers refer to the gallery as patrons rather than as spectators or fans. Gallery itself is also used. The club also disallows promotions for other network programs, or other forms of sponsored features. Significant restrictions have been placed on the tournament's broadcast hours compared to other major championships. Only in the 21st century did the tournament allow CBS to air 18-hole coverage of the leaders, a standard at the other three majors. Since 1982, CBS has used "Augusta" by Dave Loggins as the event telecast's distinctive theme music. Loggins originally came up with the song during his first trip to the Augusta course in 1981.

==== Sponsorship ====
The club mandates minimal commercial interruption, currently limited to four minutes per hour (as opposed to the usual 12 or more). This is subsidized by sponsorship packages to a small number of companies – as of 2025, these "Champion Partners" are AT&T, Bank of America, IBM, and Mercedes-Benz. The club also sells separate sponsorship packages, which do not provide rights to air commercials on the U.S. telecasts, to three "Tournament Partners"; as of 2025, those companies are Delta Air Lines, Rolex, and UPS (the last of which replaced Mercedes-Benz upon that company's elevation to "Champion Partner" status).

During CBS's first couple Masters TV broadcasts in 1956 and 1957, the network failed to attract a sponsor. In 1958, Augusta National brought on American Express as a sponsor through 1962, when it was replaced by Cluett Peabody & Company; Cadillac took over in 1969. Travelers became a sponsor in 1959. (All of these companies, or their parent companies, were run by ANGC members.) These sponsors were encouraged to film commercials on the grounds of Augusta National.

AT&T (then SBC) and IBM sponsored the tournament from 2005, joined at first by ExxonMobil, which in 2014 was replaced as a global sponsor by Mercedes-Benz, and joined by Bank of America in 2025. In 2002, in the wake of calls to boycott tournament sponsors over the Martha Burk controversy, club chairman Hootie Johnson suspended all television sponsorship of the 2003 tournament. He argued that it was "unfair" to have the Masters' sponsors become involved with the controversy by means of association with the tournament, as their sponsorship is of the Masters and not Augusta National itself. CBS agreed to split production costs for the tournament with the club to make up for the lack of sponsorship. After the arrangement continued into 2004, the tournament reinstated sponsorships for 2005, with the new partners of ExxonMobil, IBM, and SBC.

=== Radio coverage ===
The first tournament in 1934, broadcast by CBS, was the first golf tournament aired nationally in the US; Roberts saw this as an advertising opportunity. CBS declined to renew its contract in the early 1940s, and NBC took over radio broadcasts.

Historically, network radio coverage of the Masters Tournament in the United States was provided for decades by Westwood One and its predecessors, including CBS News Radio and Dial Global. During Masters week, Westwood One syndicated live hole-by-hole coverage to affiliate stations, along with regular leaderboard updates and a nightly review program known as "The Masters Tonight".

Since 2021, SiriusXM has been the exclusive audio broadcaster of the Masters Tournament, producing and presenting live play-by-play audio coverage of all four rounds, pre-round and recap programming, and special event coverage on its PGA Tour Radio channel, which temporarily rebrands to "Masters Radio" for the week of the tournament.

The current SiriusXM broadcast team features lead play-by-play announcers and on-course reporters covering the action around Augusta National Golf Club, and Masters Radio also includes related programming such as tournament specials and ancillary event coverage.

=== International television ===
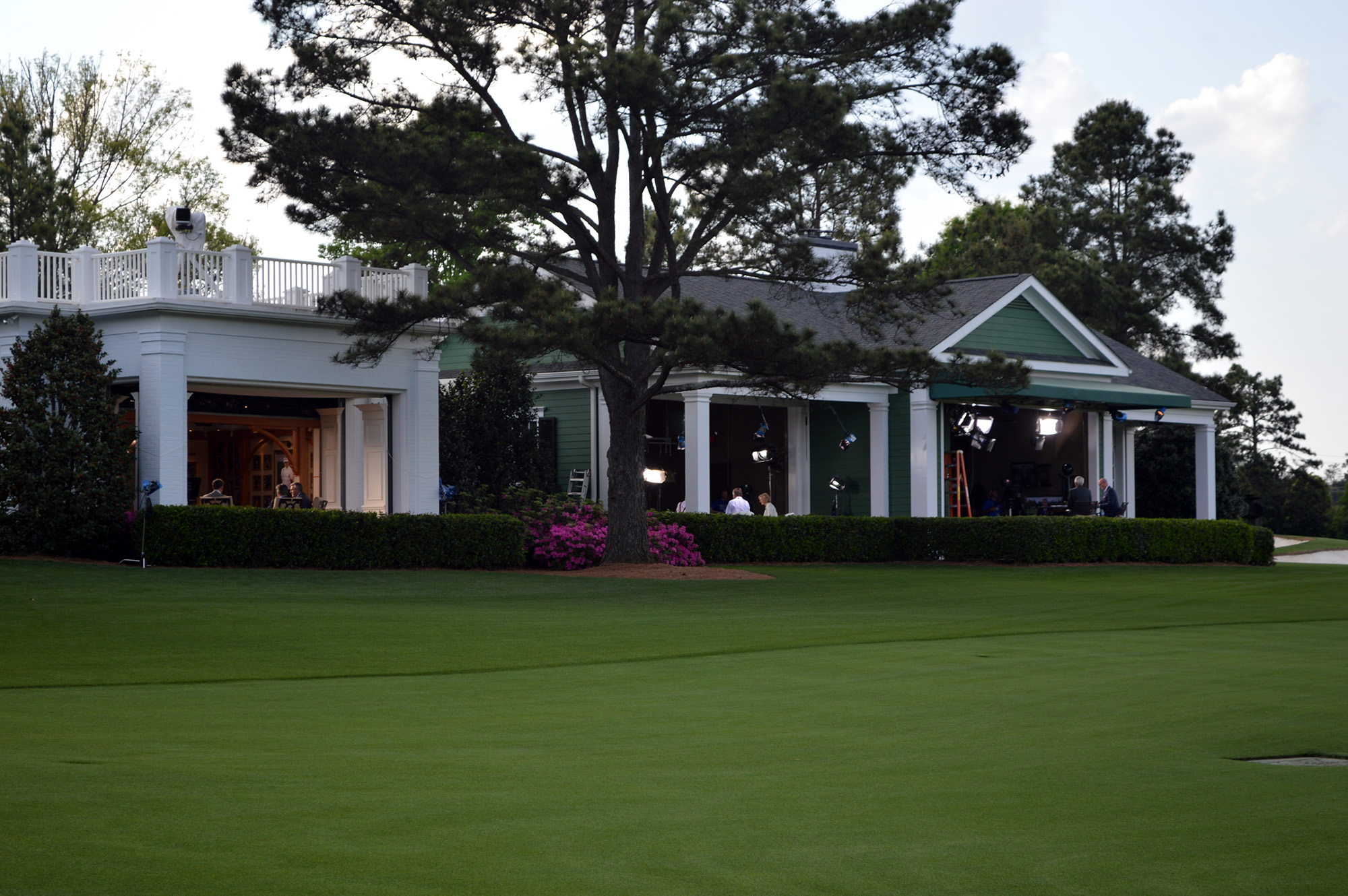
TV broadcast booths

The first UK live coverage of the event was in 1984 when Channel 4 aired coverage of the closing moments of the 3rd and 4th rounds. Channel 4 repeated this level of coverage in 1985. The rights then transferred to the BBC which also initially only provided coverage of the 3rd and 4th rounds. With the 2007 launch of BBC HD, UK viewers were able to watch the championship in that format. BBC Sport held the exclusive TV and radio rights through to 2010. The BBC's coverage airs without commercials because it is financed by a licence fee. From the 2011 Masters, Sky Sports began broadcasting all four days, as well as the par 3 contest in HD and, for the first time, in 3D. The BBC continued to air live coverage of the weekend rounds in parallel with Sky until 2019, when it was announced that Sky will hold exclusive rights to live coverage of all four rounds beginning 2020. The BBC will only hold rights to delayed highlights. With its loss of live rights to the Open Championship to Sky in 2016, it marks the first time since 1955 that the BBC no longer holds any rights to live professional golf. although the Corporation continues to provide live radio commentary on BBC Radio 5 Live.

In Ireland, Setanta Ireland previously showed all four rounds, and now since 2017 Eir Sport broadcast all four rounds live having previously broadcast the opening two rounds with RTÉ broadcasting the weekend coverage. After Eir Sport's closure in 2021, Sky Sports will broadcast the event exclusively in Ireland for the first time, like in the UK.

In Canada, broadcast rights to the Masters are held by Bell Media, with coverage divided between TSN (cable), which carries live simulcasts and primetime encores of CBS and ESPN coverage for all four rounds, CTV (broadcast), which simulcasts CBS's coverage of the weekend rounds, and RDS, which carries French-language coverage. Prior to 2013, Canadian broadcast rights were held by a marketing company, Graham Sanborn Media, which in turn bought time on the Global Television Network, TSN, and RDS (except for 2012 when French-language coverage aired on TVA and TVA Sports) to air the broadcasts, also selling all of the advertising for the Canadian broadcasts. This was an unusual arrangement in Canadian sports broadcasting, as in most cases broadcasters acquire their rights directly from the event organizers or through partnerships with international rightsholders, such as ESPN International (ESPN owns a minority stake in TSN). In 2013, Global and TSN began selling advertising directly, and co-produced supplemental programs covering the tournament (while still carrying U.S. coverage for the tournament itself).

On December 15, 2015, TSN parent company Bell Media announced that it had acquired exclusive Canadian rights to the tournament beginning 2016 under a multi-year deal. Broadcast television coverage moved to co-owned broadcast network CTV, while TSN uses its expanded five-channel service to carry supplemental feeds (including the Amen Corner feed and early coverage of each round) that were previously exclusive to digital platforms.

In France, the Masters is broadcast live on Canal+ and Canal+ Sport.

In 53 countries, including much of Latin America, broadcast rights for the entire tournament are held by the ESPN International networks.

=== Other ===
The Masters has an app developed by IBM as a "365-day operation" for its development team.

In 2025, ANGC introduced Mornings @ The Masters, a 45-minute daily live-streamed show focused on culture and lifestyle, featuring influencers Hally Leadbetter and Roger Steele, co-produced with CBS Sports, and broadcast on YouTube.
