= William "Hootie" Johnson =

American businessman and golf administrator

- Born: William Woodward Johnson; February 16, 1931; Augusta, Georgia, U.S.
- Died: July 14, 2017 (aged 86); Columbia, South Carolina, U.S.
- Education: University of South Carolina
- Occupations: businessman, banker
- Known for: Former chairman of the Bank of America executive committee, Augusta National Golf Club

Chairman of Augusta National Golf Club
- In office 1998 – October 16, 2006
- Preceded by: Jackson T. Stephens
- Succeeded by: Billy Payne

William Woodward "Hootie" Johnson (February 16, 1931 – July 14, 2017) was the chairman of the executive committee at Bank of America, a member of the South Carolina Business Hall of Fame, and a chairman of Augusta National Golf Club.

== Early life and personal ==
Johnson was born to Dewey H. and Mabel (née Woodward) Johnson, in 1931 at Augusta, Georgia and grew up in Greenwood, South Carolina, attending Greenwood High School. He attended the University of South Carolina on a football scholarship.

Johnson was married to Pierrine Johnson and had four daughters, ten grandchildren and 12 great-grandchildren. He died of congestive heart failure on July 14, 2017, at the age of 86.

== Banking career ==
After graduating, Johnson returned home and worked with his father at the Bank of Greenwood, which eventually evolved into the State Bank and Trust Company, and subsequently was renamed Bankers Trust of South Carolina in 1969. By 1965, Johnson had assumed control of the bank, and under his leadership, Bankers Trust of South Carolina rose from obscurity to become a high-performance, widely respected bank. Johnson served as chairman of the executive committee at Bank of America, and also a director of the company. He also served on the boards of Duke Power, Liberty Corporation, Alltel and Stephens, Inc.

== Augusta National ==
Johnson was the chairman of Augusta National Golf Club, which hosts the annual Masters Tournament, from 1998 to 2006. He directed two significant overhauls of the golf course, allowed 18-hole network television coverage of the Masters for the first time, and made significant changes to the tournament's qualifying procedures. He was succeeded by Billy Payne, and was named the club's chairman emeritus.

=== 2002 membership controversy ===
Johnson was widely known for a disagreement beginning in 2002 with Martha Burk, then chairwoman of the Washington-based National Council of Women's Organizations, over admission of female members to Augusta National. Burk contended that hosting the Masters Tournament at a male-only club, constituted sexism because 15% of the club's membership were CEO's, many of them Fortune 500 CEO's. Johnson characterized Burk's approach as "offensive and coercive", and despite efforts to conflate the issue with sexism and civil rights, Johnson maintained the issue had to do with the rights of any private club.

Our membership is single gender just as many other organizations and clubs all across America. These would include junior Leagues, sororities, fraternities, Boy Scouts, Girl Scouts, and countless others. And we all have a moral and legal right to organize our clubs the way we wish.

Burk – whose childhood nickname was also Hootie – was "called a man hater, anti-family, lesbian, all the usual things." According to Hugh McColl, former CEO and chairman of Bank of America, and a friend and member of Augusta National, Johnson was portrayed as a Senator Claghorn type – a blustery defender of all things Southern.

Following the discord, which included Burk's launching a now defunct website augustadiscriminates.org, two club members resigned: Thomas H. Wyman, a former CEO of CBS, and John Snow, following his nomination by then-President George W. Bush to serve as Secretary of the Treasury.

In 2012, Johnson nominated Darla Moore to become a member of Augusta National; Moore and Condoleezza Rice became the first two female members of the club.

== Political career ==
Johnson was a member of the South Carolina House of Representatives during 1957 and 1958. He also was a trustee of historically black Benedict College. Johnson served as former board member of the National Urban League; served as co-chairman of committee that developed a plan to desegregate universities in South Carolina, and in 1975, received the Outstanding Citizen Award from B'nai B'rith. He had supported African-Americans for public office. As a banker, he had appointed African-Americans and women to his corporate boards. He made loans to minorities. Following the 1968 Orangeburg massacre (in which three South Carolina State University students were killed by state troopers while participating in civil rights protests), Johnson had worked on a desegregation plan for the state's colleges and universities. Johnson had also been the first businessman who pushed to have the Confederate flag removed from the state house in Columbia.

Johnson also served as chairman of the South Carolina State Ports Authority, chairman of the South Carolina Research Authority, and trustee of the University of South Carolina Business Partnership Foundation.
