= Joe Campbell (golfer) =

American professional golfer (1935–2024)

Personal information
- Full name: Joseph Edward Campbell
- Nationality: United States
- Born: November 5, 1935 Anderson, Indiana, U.S.
- Died: November 27, 2024 (aged 89) Lake Wales, Florida, U.S.
- Height: 5 ft 8.5 in (1.74 m)
- Weight: 175 lb (79 kg; 12.5 st)

Career
- Sport: Golf
- College: Purdue University
- Turned professional: 1958
- Former tours: PGA Tour; Champions Tour
- Professional wins: 15

Number of wins by tour
- PGA Tour: 3
- Other: 12

Best results in major championships
- Masters Tournament: T29: 1958
- PGA Championship: T27: 1962
- U.S. Open: T22: 1957
- The Open Championship: DNP

Joseph Edward Campbell (November 5, 1935 – November 27, 2024) was an American professional golfer who played on the PGA Tour in the late 1950s and 1960s.

== Early life ==
Campbell was born in Anderson, Indiana, where he attended Anderson High School – leading the Indians to IHSAA state titles in 1952 and 1953; winning the individual championships in both years.

== Amateur career ==
Campbell attended Purdue University, where he was a member of the golf team as well as a co-captain of the basketball team. He won the 1955 NCAA Championship as Purdue finished 2nd in the team standings, he was also the 1956 and 1957 Big Ten Conference Champion and led Purdue to the 1955 and 1956 Big Ten Team Championships. During his amateur career, he won the Indiana Amateur three times, the Indiana Open twice, and the Sunnehanna Amateur in 1957. His best finish in a major championship, which came during his amateur career, was T-22 at the 1957 U.S. Open. He was also a member of the United States' 1956 Americas Cup and 1957 Walker Cup team, leading the Americans to an 8½–3½ victory over Great Britain.

== Professional career ==
In 1958, Campbell turned professional. He joined the PGA Tour in 1959 and competed for fourteen years. He received Golf Digest's Rookie-of-the-Year award in 1959. His 43 top-10 finishes included three wins, seven runner-up and six third-place finishes; he finished in top-25 103 times. He played on the Senior PGA Tour from 1986 to 1989 and 1995 to 1996, with his best finish a T-24th at the 1987 Bank One Senior Golf Classic.

Campbell made his home in Knoxville, Tennessee after graduating from college in 1957 until 1974. After his days as a tour professional were over, he was the golf professional at Knoxville's Whittle Springs from 1967 to 1974. In 1974, he became the men's golf team coach at Purdue, leading them to the 1981 Big Ten Championship and 24 Invitational titles, he retired following the 1993 season.

== Personal life ==
Campbell lived in Lake Wales, Florida. He died there on November 27, 2024, at the age of 89.

== Awards and honors ==
- In 1959, he earned Golf Digest's Rookie of the Year award
- In 1969, Campbell was inducted into Indiana Golf Hall of Fame
- In 2001, he was inducted into the Purdue Intercollegiate Athletics Hall of Fame
- In 2007, Campbell was inducted into the Tennessee Golf Hall of Fame

== Amateur wins ==
- 1952 IHSAA Boys State Champion
- 1953 IHSAA Boys State Champion
- 1954 Indiana Amateur
- 1955 Indiana Amateur, Indiana Boys Junior, NCAA Championship (individual)
- 1956 Indiana Amateur, Indiana Boys Junior, Big Ten Conference Championship (individual)
- 1957 Sunnehanna Amateur, Big Ten Conference Championship (individual)

== Professional wins (15) ==
=== PGA Tour wins (3) ===
No.	Date	Tournament	Winning score	Margin of victory	Runner-up
1	Nov 12, 1961	Beaumont Open Invitational	−7 (72-71-68-66=277)	1 stroke	(United States) Bert Weaver
2	Mar 4, 1962	Baton Rouge Open Invitational	−14 (68-70-67-69=274)	2 strokes	(United States) Bob Rosburg
3	Feb 20, 1966	Tucson Open Invitational	−10 (69-70-69-70=278)	Playoff	(United States) Gene Littler

PGA Tour playoff record (1–2)

No.	Year	Tournament	Opponent	Result
1	1962	Bing Crosby National Pro-Am	(United States) Doug Ford	Lost to par on first extra hole
2	1966	Tucson Open Invitational	(United States) Gene Littler	Won with birdie on first extra hole
3	1967	Azalea Open Invitational	(United States) Randy Glover	Lost to birdie on second extra hole

=== Other wins (12) ===
- 1955 Indiana Open (as amateur)
- 1956 Indiana Open (as amateur)
- 1958 Tennessee Open
- 1965 Tennessee Open, Tennessee PGA Championship
- 1966 Tennessee PGA Championship
- 1967 Tennessee PGA Championship
- 1970 Tennessee PGA Championship
- 1972 Tennessee PGA Championship
- 1973 Tennessee Open
- 1977 Indiana Open
- 1981 Indiana Open

== U.S. national team appearances ==
Amateur

- Walker Cup: 1957 (winners)
- Americas Cup: 1956 (winners)
