= 1960 PGA Tour =

Golf tour season

1960 PGA Tour season
- Duration: January 8, 1960 – December 11, 1960
- Number of official events: 44
- Most wins: (United States) Arnold Palmer (8)
- Money list: (United States) Arnold Palmer
- PGA Player of the Year: (United States) Arnold Palmer

The 1960 PGA Tour was the 45th season of the PGA Tour, the main professional golf tour in the United States.

== Schedule ==
The following table lists official events during the 1960 season.

Date	Tournament	Location	Purse (US$)	Winner (Note: The number in parentheses after each winner's name is the number of PGA Tour events they had won up to and including that tournament. This information is only shown for PGA Tour members.)	Notes
Jan 12	Los Angeles Open	California	37,500	(United States) Dow Finsterwald (9)	
Jan 18	Yorba Linda Open Invitational	California	20,000	(United States) Jerry Barber (3)	New tournament
Jan 24	Bing Crosby National Pro-Am	California	50,000	(United States) Ken Venturi (9)	Pro-Am
Jan 31	San Diego Open Invitational	California	20,000	(United States) Mike Souchak (11)	
Feb 7	Palm Springs Desert Golf Classic	California	70,000	(United States) Arnold Palmer (14)	New tournament Pro-Am
Feb 15	Phoenix Open Invitational	Arizona	22,500	(United States) Jack Fleck (2)	
Feb 21	Tucson Open Invitational	Arizona	20,000	(United States) Don January (2)	
Feb 28	Texas Open Invitational	Texas	20,000	(United States) Arnold Palmer (15)	
Mar 6	Baton Rouge Open Invitational	Louisiana	15,000	(United States) Arnold Palmer (16)	
Mar 13	Pensacola Open Invitational	Florida	15,000	(United States) Arnold Palmer (17)	
Mar 21	St. Petersburg Open Invitational	Florida	15,000	(United States) George Bayer (4)	
Mar 27	De Soto Open Invitational	Florida	35,000	(United States) Sam Snead (79)	New tournament
Apr 3	Azalea Open	North Carolina	15,000	(United States) Tom Nieporte (2)	
Apr 10	Masters Tournament	Georgia	87,000	(United States) Arnold Palmer (18)	Major championship
Apr 17	Greater Greensboro Open	North Carolina	20,000	(United States) Sam Snead (80)	
Apr 24	Greater New Orleans Open Invitational	Louisiana	25,000	(United States) Dow Finsterwald (10)	
May 3	Houston Classic	Texas	35,000	(United States) Bill Collins (2)	
May 8	Tournament of Champions	Nevada	42,000	(United States) Jerry Barber (4)	Winners-only event
May 15	Colonial National Invitation	Texas	30,000	(United States) Julius Boros (9)	Invitational
May 22	Hot Springs Open Invitational	Arkansas	20,000	(United States) Bill Collins (3)	
May 22	Sam Snead Festival	West Virginia	15,000	(United States) Dave Marr (n/a)	Alternate event (Note: Official money; unofficial win.)
May 29	500 Festival Open Invitation	Indiana	50,000	(United States) Doug Ford (15)	New tournament
Jun 6	Memphis Open Invitational	Tennessee	30,000	(United States) Tommy Bolt (14)	
Jun 12	Oklahoma City Open Invitational	Oklahoma	30,000	(United States) Gene Littler (15)	
Jun 18	U.S. Open	Colorado	60,000	(United States) Arnold Palmer (19)	Major championship
Jul 4	Buick Open Invitational	Michigan	50,000	(United States) Mike Souchak (12)	
Jul 9	The Open Championship	Scotland	£7,000	(Australia) Kel Nagle (1)	Major championship (Note: Unofficial money event at the time, but retrospectively counted as an official win.)
Jul 9	Canadian Open	Canada	25,000	(United States) Art Wall Jr. (11)	
Jul 17	Western Open	Michigan	30,000	(Canada) Stan Leonard (3)	
Jul 24	PGA Championship	Ohio	65,000	(United States) Jay Hebert (5)	Major championship
Jul 31	Eastern Open Invitational	Maryland	25,000	(United States) Gene Littler (16)	
Aug 7	Insurance City Open Invitational	Connecticut	25,000	(United States) Arnold Palmer (20)	
Aug 21	St. Paul Open Invitational	Minnesota	30,000	(United States) Don Fairfield (2)	
Aug 28	Milwaukee Open Invitational	Wisconsin	30,000	(United States) Ken Venturi (10)	
Sep 5	Dallas Open Invitational	Texas	25,000	(United States) Johnny Pott (1)	
Sep 12	Utah Open Invitational	Utah	20,000	(United States) Bill Johnston (2)	
Sep 18	Carling Open Invitational	Washington	25,000	(United States) Ernie Vossler (3)	
Sep 25	Portland Open Invitational	Oregon	20,000	(United States) Billy Casper (11)	
Oct 3	Hesperia Open Invitational	California	15,000	(United States) Billy Casper (12)	
Oct 16	Orange County Open Invitational	California	15,000	(United States) Billy Casper (13)	
Nov 20	Cajun Classic Open Invitational	Louisiana	15,000	(United States) Lionel Hebert (3)	
Nov 27	Mobile Sertoma Open Invitational	Alabama	15,000	(United States) Arnold Palmer (21)	
Dec 4	West Palm Beach Open Invitational	Florida	15,000	(United States) Johnny Pott (2)	
Dec 11	Coral Gables Open Invitational	Florida	20,000	(United States) Bob Goalby (2)	

=== Unofficial events ===
The following events were sanctioned by the PGA Tour, but did not carry official money, nor were wins official.

Date	Tournament	Location	Purse ($)	Winner(s)	Notes
Jun 26	Canada Cup	Ireland	n/a	(United States) Arnold Palmer and (United States) Sam Snead	Team event
Jun 26	Canada Cup Individual Trophy	Ireland	n/a	(Belgium) Flory Van Donck	

== Money list ==
The money list was based on prize money won during the season, calculated in U.S. dollars.

Position	Player	Prize money ($)
1	(United States) Arnold Palmer	80,968
2	(United States) Ken Venturi	46,410
3	(United States) Dow Finsterwald	43,942
4	(United States) Billy Casper	38,107
5	(United States) Jay Hebert	36,840
6	(United States) Doug Ford	34,428
7	(United States) Gene Littler	32,568
8	(United States) Mike Souchak	32,121
9	(United States) Doug Sanders	30,506
10	(United States) Bill Collins	30,165

== Awards ==
Award	Winner	Ref.
PGA Player of the Year	(United States) Arnold Palmer	
Scoring leader (Vardon Trophy)	(United States) Billy Casper	
