= Houston Open =

Golf tournament held in Houston, Texas, US

Coordinates: 29.924°N 95.261°W

Texas Children's Houston Open

Tournament information
- Location: Houston, Texas
- Established: 1946
- Course: Memorial Park Municipal Golf Course
- Par: 70
- Length: 7,432 yards (6,796 m)
- Tour: PGA Tour
- Format: Stroke play
- Prize fund: US$9,900,000
- Month played: March
- Website: tchouopen.com

Tournament record score
- Aggregate: 259 Gary Woodland (2026)
- To par: −22 Vijay Singh (2002)

Current champion
- (United States) Gary Woodland

Final champion
- Location in the United States Location in Texas

The Texas Children's Houston Open is a professional golf tournament in Texas on the PGA Tour, played in March. As a part of a restructuring of the schedule, the event moved to the fall in 2019. Because the tour year starts the previous fall, the event was not a part of the 2019 PGA Tour, but was one of the first events of the 2020 PGA Tour. It is held at the Memorial Park Municipal Golf Course in Harris County near downtown Houston and the Galleria.

== History ==
The event was played at several Houston venues until the 1970s, starting 80 years ago at River Oaks Country Club in 1946 before moving to Memorial Park Golf Course in 1947 and, after a year off, moving again to Pine Forest Country Club in 1949 and BraeBurn Country Club in 1950. After this period of wandering, the tournament settled in at Memorial Park from 1951 through 1963. It was at Sharpstown Country Club in 1964 and 1965, moved to Champions Golf Club in 1966 for six years, and then to Westwood Country Club in 1972.

The tournament ventured outside of the city limits in 1973 and 1974 at Quail Valley Country Club in Missouri City, a southwest suburb. It relocated north to The Woodlands in 1975, at Woodlands Country Club until 1984, then at the TPC at The Woodlands through 2002. It moved to near Humble in 2003, where it stayed for 17 years; initially played at the Members Course, it changed to the Tournament Course in 2006. The facility was known as Redstone Golf Club until December 2013, and is now the Golf Club of Houston.

Previously held weeks later in mid-spring, the Houston Open was played the week before the Masters Tournament from 2007 through 2018 (except 2013, when it was two weeks before the Masters), and was the last chance to get into the field at Augusta through a win. The tournament also had up to four additional sponsor exemptions to enable nonmember Masters-qualified professionals from the top 100 of the Official World Golf Ranking to compete in the U.S. in the week prior to the Masters.

Shell Oil Company sponsored the event from 1992 through 2017. When the end of Shell's sponsorship was announced, the PGA Tour said it would seek a new sponsor for 2018. At that time, Houston Astros owner Jim Crane led a group of new sponsors who signed a five-year deal with the PGA Tour to ensure that the event stayed in Houston. The tournament is now operated under the Astros Foundation, under the umbrella Astros Golf Foundation, with a new logo inspired by the Astros' "Tequila Sunrise" uniforms of the 1980s.

Because of the wraparound calendar, there was no 2019 season event. The 2019 event moved to October and declared a 2020 season event, the last event held at the Golf Club of Houston. For the 2021 season (November 2020), it moved to the renovated Memorial Park Golf Course. The Astros Foundation committed $34 million to renovate and redesign the golf course facilities with input from golfer Brooks Koepka. Due to the COVID-19 pandemic, the PGA Tour announced schedule changes to the 2020–21 season schedule and moved the Houston Open to November 5–8, one week before the Masters Tournament. The tournament was sponsored by Vivint and the Astros Foundation allowed spectators.

The 2022 season (November 2021) event was sponsored by Hewlett Packard Enterprise.

The 2023 season (November 2022) event was sponsored by Cadence Bank.

The 2024 event will see a return to a calendar-year format for the PGA Tour, with the event returning to a spring date in March, being sponsored by Texas Children's Hospital.

== Winners ==
Year	Winner	Score	To par	Margin of victory	Runner(s)-up	Purse (US$)	Winner's share ($)
Texas Children's Houston Open
2026	(United States) Gary Woodland	259	−21	5 strokes	(Denmark) Nicolai Højgaard	9,900,000	1,782,000
2025	(Australia) Min Woo Lee	260	−20	1 stroke	(United States) Scottie Scheffler (United States) Gary Woodland	9,500,000	1,710,000
2024	(Germany) Stephan Jäger	268	−12	1 stroke	(Belgium) Thomas Detry (United States) Tony Finau (United States) Taylor Moore (United States) Scottie Scheffler (Argentina) Alejandro Tosti	9,100,000	1,638,000
2023: No tournament
Cadence Bank Houston Open
2022	(United States) Tony Finau	264	−16	4 strokes	(United States) Tyson Alexander	8,400,000	1,512,000
Hewlett Packard Enterprise Houston Open
2021	(United States) Jason Kokrak	270	−10	2 strokes	(United States) Scottie Scheffler (United States) Kevin Tway	7,500,000	1,350,000
Vivint Houston Open
2020	(Mexico) Carlos Ortiz	267	−13	2 strokes	(United States) Dustin Johnson (Japan) Hideki Matsuyama	7,000,000	1,260,000
Houston Open
2019	(United States) Lanto Griffin	274	−14	1 stroke	(United States) Scott Harrington (United States) Mark Hubbard	7,500,000	1,350,000
2018	(England) Ian Poulter	269	−19	Playoff	(United States) Beau Hossler	7,000,000	1,260,000
Shell Houston Open
2017	(United States) Russell Henley	268	−20	3 strokes	(South Korea) Kang Sung-hoon	7,000,000	1,260,000
2016	(United States) Jim Herman	273	−15	1 stroke	(Sweden) Henrik Stenson	6,800,000	1,224,000
2015	(United States) J. B. Holmes	272	−16	Playoff	(United States) Jordan Spieth (United States) Johnson Wagner	6,600,000	1,188,000
2014	(Australia) Matt Jones	273	−15	Playoff	(United States) Matt Kuchar	6,400,000	1,152,000
2013	(United States) D. A. Points	272	−16	1 stroke	(United States) Billy Horschel (Sweden) Henrik Stenson	6,200,000	1,116,000
2012	(United States) Hunter Mahan	272	−16	1 stroke	(Sweden) Carl Pettersson	6,000,000	1,080,000
2011	(United States) Phil Mickelson	268	−20	3 strokes	(United States) Chris Kirk (United States) Scott Verplank	5,900,000	1,062,000
2010	(United States) Anthony Kim	276	−12	Playoff	(United States) Vaughn Taylor	5,800,000	1,044,000
2009	(England) Paul Casey	277	−11	Playoff	(United States) J. B. Holmes	5,700,000	1,026,000
2008	(United States) Johnson Wagner	272	−16	2 strokes	(United States) Chad Campbell (Australia) Geoff Ogilvy	5,600,000	1,008,000
2007	(Australia) Adam Scott	271	−17	3 strokes	(Australia) Stuart Appleby (United States) Bubba Watson	5,500,000	990,000
2006	(Australia) Stuart Appleby (2)	269	−19	6 strokes	(United States) Bob Estes	5,500,000	990,000
2005	(Fiji) Vijay Singh (3)	275	−13	Playoff	(United States) John Daly	5,000,000	900,000
2004	(Fiji) Vijay Singh (2)	277	−11	2 strokes	(United States) Scott Hoch	5,000,000	900,000
2003	(United States) Fred Couples	267	−21	4 strokes	(Australia) Stuart Appleby (United States) Mark Calcavecchia (United States) Hank Kuehne	4,500,000	810,000
2002	(Fiji) Vijay Singh	266	−22	6 strokes	(Northern Ireland) Darren Clarke	4,000,000	720,000
2001	(United States) Hal Sutton	278	−10	3 strokes	(United States) Joe Durant (United States) Lee Janzen	3,400,000	612,000
2000	(Australia) Robert Allenby	275	−13	Playoff	(United States) Craig Stadler	2,800,000	504,000
1999	(Australia) Stuart Appleby	279	−9	1 stroke	(United States) John Cook (United States) Hal Sutton	2,500,000	450,000
1998	(United States) David Duval	276	−12	1 stroke	(United States) Jeff Maggert	2,000,000	360,000
1997	(United States) Phil Blackmar	276	−12	Playoff	(United States) Kevin Sutherland	1,600,000	288,000
1996	(United States) Mark Brooks	274	−14	Playoff	(United States) Jeff Maggert	1,500,000	270,000
1995	(United States) Payne Stewart	276	−12	Playoff	(United States) Scott Hoch	1,400,000	252,000
1994	(United States) Mike Heinen	272	−16	3 strokes	(United States) Tom Kite (United States) Jeff Maggert (United States) Hal Sutton	1,300,000	234,000
1993	(United States) Jim McGovern	199 (Note: Shortened to 54 holes due to weather.)	−17	Playoff	(United States) John Huston	1,300,000	234,000
1992	(United States) Fred Funk	272	−16	2 strokes	(United States) Kirk Triplett	1,200,000	216,000
Independent Insurance Agent Open
1991	(South Africa) Fulton Allem	273	−15	1 stroke	(United States) Billy Ray Brown (United States) Mike Hulbert (United States) Tom Kite	800,000	144,000
1990	(United States) Tony Sills	204	−12	Playoff	(United States) Gil Morgan	1,000,000	180,000
1989	(United States) Mike Sullivan	280	−8	1 stroke	(United States) Craig Stadler	800,000	144,000
1988	(United States) Curtis Strange (3)	270	−18	Playoff	(Australia) Greg Norman	700,000	126,000
Big "I" Houston Open
1987	(United States) Jay Haas	276	−12	Playoff	(United States) Buddy Gardner	600,000	108,000
Houston Open
1986	(United States) Curtis Strange (2)	274	−14	Playoff	(United States) Calvin Peete	500,000	90,000
1985	(United States) Raymond Floyd	277	−11	1 stroke	(South Africa) David Frost (United States) Bob Lohr	500,000	90,000
Houston Coca-Cola Open
1984	(United States) Corey Pavin	274	−10	1 stroke	(United States) Buddy Gardner	500,000	90,000
1983	(Australia) David Graham	275	−9	5 strokes	(United States) Lee Elder (United States) Jim Thorpe (United States) Lee Trevino	400,000	72,000
Michelob-Houston Open
1982	(United States) Ed Sneed	275	−9	Playoff	(Australia) Bob Shearer	350,000	63,000
1981	(United States) Ron Streck	198	−15	3 strokes	(United States) Hale Irwin (United States) Jerry Pate	262,500	47,250
1980	(United States) Curtis Strange	266	−18	Playoff	(United States) Lee Trevino	350,000	63,000
Houston Open
1979	(United States) Wayne Levi	268	−16	2 strokes	(United States) Mike Brannan	300,000	54,000
1978	(South Africa) Gary Player	270	−18	1 stroke	(United States) Andy Bean	200,000	40,000
1977	(United States) Gene Littler	276	−12	3 strokes	(United States) Lanny Wadkins	200,000	40,000
1976	(United States) Lee Elder	278	−10	1 stroke	(United States) Forrest Fezler	200,000	40,000
1975	(Australia) Bruce Crampton (2)	273	−15	2 strokes	(United States) Gil Morgan	150,000	30,000
1974	(United States) Dave Hill	276	−12	1 stroke	(United States) Rod Curl (United States) Steve Melnyk (United States) Andy North	150,000	30,000
1973	(Australia) Bruce Crampton	277	−11	1 stroke	(United States) Dave Stockton	205,000	41,000
1972	(Australia) Bruce Devlin	278	−10	2 strokes	(United States) Tommy Aaron (United States) Lou Graham (United States) Doug Sanders	125,000	25,000
Houston Champions International
1971	(United States) Hubert Green	280	−4	Playoff	(United States) Don January	125,000	25,000
1970	(United States) Gibby Gilbert	282	−2	Playoff	(Australia) Bruce Crampton	115,000	23,000
1969: No tournament - club hosted the 1969 U.S. Open
1968	(Argentina) Roberto De Vicenzo	274	−10	1 stroke	(United States) Lee Trevino	100,000	20,000
1967	(United States) Frank Beard	274	−10	1 stroke	(United States) Arnold Palmer	115,000	23,000
1966	(United States) Arnold Palmer (2)	275	−9	1 stroke	(United States) Gardner Dickinson	110,000	21,000
Houston Classic
1965	(United States) Bobby Nichols (2)	273	−11	1 stroke	(Australia) Bruce Devlin (United States) Chi-Chi Rodríguez	75,000	12,000
1964	(United States) Mike Souchak (2)	278	−6	1 stroke	(United States) Jack Nicklaus	50,000	7,500
1963	(New Zealand) Bob Charles	268	−20	1 stroke	(United States) Fred Hawkins	50,000	10,000
1962	(United States) Bobby Nichols	278	−10	Playoff	(United States) Jack Nicklaus (United States) Dan Sikes	50,000	9,000
1961	(United States) Jay Hebert	276	−12	Playoff	(United States) Ken Venturi	40,000	7,000
1960	(United States) Bill Collins	280	E	Playoff	(United States) Arnold Palmer	35,000	5,300
1959	(United States) Jack Burke Jr. (2)	277	−3	Playoff	(United States) Julius Boros	30,000	4,300
Houston Open
1958	(United States) Ed Oliver	281	+1	1 stroke	(Argentina) Roberto De Vicenzo (United States) Jay Hebert	30,000	4,300
1957	(United States) Arnold Palmer	279	−1	1 stroke	(United States) Doug Ford	36,000	7,500
1956	(United States) Ted Kroll	277	−3	3 strokes	(United States) Jack Burke Jr. (United States) Dave Douglas	30,000	6,000
1955	(United States) Mike Souchak	273	−7	2 strokes	(United States) Jerry Barber	30,000	6,000
1954	(United States) Dave Douglas	277	−3	2 strokes	(United States) Cary Middlecoff	30,000	6,000
1953	(United States) Cary Middlecoff (2)	283	+3	Playoff	(Australia) Jim Ferrier (United States) Shelley Mayfield (United States) Bill Nary (United States) Earl Stewart	20,000	4,000
1952	(United States) Jack Burke Jr.	277	−3	6 strokes	(United States) Frank Stranahan	10,000	2,000
1951	(United States) Marty Furgol	277	−3	1 stroke	(United States) Jack Burke Jr.	10,000	2,000
1950	(United States) Cary Middlecoff	277	−11	3 strokes	(United States) Pete Cooper	10,000	2,000
1949	(United States) Johnny Palmer	272	−16	1 stroke	(United States) Cary Middlecoff	10,000	2,000
1948: No tournament
1947	(South Africa) Bobby Locke	277	−11	5 strokes	(United States) Johnny Palmer (United States) Ellsworth Vines	10,000	2,000
1946	(United States) Byron Nelson	274	−10	2 strokes	(United States) Ben Hogan	10,000	2,000

Note: Green highlight indicates scoring records.

== See also ==
- Houston Open (early PGA Tour), an earlier Houston event recognized by the PGA Tour
