= Pensacola Open =

Golf tournament

Tournament information
- Location: Gulf Breeze, Florida
- Established: 1956
- Course: Tiger Point Golf Club
- Par: 72
- Length: 7,033 yards (6,431 m)
- Tour: PGA Tour
- Format: Stroke play
- Prize fund: US$400,000
- Month played: October
- Final year: 1988

Tournament record score
- Aggregate: 262 Gay Brewer (1967)
- To par: −26 as above

Final champion
- (United States) Andrew Magee
- Location in the United States Location in Florida

The Pensacola Open was a golf tournament on the PGA Tour. The inaugural version of the tournament was played in 1956 and its last edition in 1988.

== Tournament highlights ==
- 1960: Arnold Palmer birdies the 72nd hole to win by one shot over Doug Sanders. It is Palmer's third consecutive win in as many weeks.
- 1966: Defending champion Doug Sanders is ahead by four shots after 36 holes when he is disqualified for not signing his scorecard.
- 1967: Gay Brewer successfully defends his Pensacola Open. He shoots a then record 191 for 54 holes and wins by six shots over local pro Bob Keller.
- 1968: George Archer birdies the last three holes on Sunday on his way to a 65 and a one-shot win over Dave Marr and Tony Jacklin.
- 1972: Dave Hill wins for the first time in two years. He birdies the 72nd hole to beat Jerry Heard by one shot.
- 1974: Lee Elder birdies the 4th hole of a sudden death playoff to defeat Peter Oosterhuis and win for the first time ever on the PGA Tour. With the win, Elder becomes the first black golfer to qualify for the Masters Tournament.
- 1979: Future two-time U.S. Open champion Curtis Strange wins for the first time on the PGA Tour. He beats Billy Kratzert by one shot.
- 1981: Pensacola resident Jerry Pate wins by three shots over Steve Melnyk.
- 1982: Calvin Peete wins by seven shots over Hal Sutton and Dan Halldorson. It is Peete's 4th PGA Tour win for the year tying him for the most with Craig Stadler.
- 1986: As rain shortens the Pensacola Open to only 36 holes, Ernie Gonzalez becomes the first left-handed golfer to win on the PGA Tour since Bob Charles won the 1974 Greater Greensboro Open.
- 1988: Andrew Magee wins the last Pensacola Open. He beats Bruce Lietzke, Ken Green, and Tom Byrum by one shot.

== Tournament hosts ==
This list is incomplete.

- 1988 Tiger Point Golf & Country Club in Gulf Breeze, Florida
- 1978–1987 Perdido Bay Country Club in Pensacola, Florida
- 1958–1977 Pensacola Country Club in Pensacola, Florida

== Winners ==
| Year | Winner | Score | To par | Margin of victory | Runner(s)-up |
Pensacola Open
| 1988 | (United States) Andrew Magee | 271 | −17 | 1 stroke | (United States) Tom Byrum (United States) Ken Green (United States) Bruce Lietzke |
| 1987 | (United States) Doug Tewell | 269 | −15 | 3 strokes | (United States) Phil Blackmar (United States) Danny Edwards |
| 1986 | (United States) Ernie Gonzalez | 128 (Note: Shortened to 36 holes due to rain.) | −14 | 1 stroke | (United States) Joey Sindelar |
| 1985 | (United States) Danny Edwards | 269 | −15 | 1 stroke | (United States) John Mahaffey (United States) Gil Morgan |
| 1984 | (United States) Billy Kratzert | 270 | −14 | 2 strokes | (Scotland) Ken Brown (United States) John Mahaffey |
| 1983 | (United States) Mark McCumber | 266 | −18 | 4 strokes | (United States) Lon Hinkle (United States) Mark Lye |
| 1982 | (United States) Calvin Peete | 268 | −16 | 7 strokes | (Canada) Dan Halldorson (United States) Hal Sutton |
| 1981 | (United States) Jerry Pate | 271 | −17 | 3 strokes | (United States) Steve Melnyk |
| 1980 | (Canada) Dan Halldorson | 275 | −13 | 2 strokes | (United States) Gary Hallberg (United States) Mike Sullivan |
| 1979 | (United States) Curtis Strange | 271 | −17 | 1 stroke | (United States) Billy Kratzert |
| 1978 | (United States) Mac McLendon | 272 | −16 | Playoff | (United States) Mike Reid |
| 1977 | (United States) Leonard Thompson | 268 | −16 | 2 strokes | (United States) Curtis Strange |
| 1976 | (United States) Mark Hayes | 275 | −9 | 2 strokes | (United States) Lee Elder |
| 1975 | (United States) Jerry McGee | 271 | −13 | 2 strokes | (United States) Wally Armstrong |
Monsanto Open
| 1974 | (United States) Lee Elder | 274 | −10 | Playoff | (England) Peter Oosterhuis |
| 1973 | (United States) Homero Blancas | 277 | −11 | 1 stroke | (United States) Frank Beard |
| 1972 | (United States) Dave Hill | 271 | −13 | 1 stroke | (United States) Jerry Heard |
| 1971 | (United States) Gene Littler | 276 | −8 | 3 strokes | (United States) George Archer (United States) Pete Brown |
| 1970 | (United States) Dick Lotz | 275 | −9 | 3 strokes | (United States) Dave Stockton |
Monsanto Open Invitational
| 1969 | (United States) Jim Colbert | 267 | −17 | 2 strokes | (United States) Deane Beman |
Pensacola Open Invitational
| 1968 | (United States) George Archer | 268 | −20 | 1 stroke | (England) Tony Jacklin (United States) Dave Marr |
| 1967 | (United States) Gay Brewer (2) | 262 | −26 | 6 strokes | (United States) Bob Keller |
| 1966 | (United States) Gay Brewer | 272 | −16 | 3 strokes | (Australia) Bruce Devlin |
| 1965 | (United States) Doug Sanders (2) | 277 | −11 | Playoff | (United States) Jack Nicklaus |
| 1964 | (South Africa) Gary Player | 274 | −14 | Playoff | (United States) Miller Barber (United States) Arnold Palmer |
| 1963 | (United States) Arnold Palmer (2) | 273 | −15 | 2 strokes | (United States) Harold Kneece (South Africa) Gary Player |
| 1962 | (United States) Doug Sanders | 270 | −18 | 1 stroke | (United States) Don Fairfield |
| 1961 | (United States) Tommy Bolt | 275 | −13 | 2 strokes | (South Africa) Gary Player |
| 1960 | (United States) Arnold Palmer | 273 | −15 | 1 stroke | (United States) Doug Sanders |
| 1959 | (United States) Paul Harney | 269 | −19 | 3 strokes | (United States) Jay Hebert |
| 1958 | (United States) Doug Ford | 278 | −10 | 2 strokes | (United States) Ken Venturi (United States) Art Wall Jr. |
| 1957 | (United States) Art Wall Jr. | 273 | −15 | 2 strokes | (Australia) Peter Thomson |
| 1956 | (United States) Don Fairfield | 275 | −13 | 2 strokes | (United States) Bo Wininger |
