= 500 Festival Open Invitation =

Golf tournament

Coordinates: 39.789°N 86.229°W

Tournament information
- Location: Speedway, Indiana
- Established: 1960
- Course: Speedway Golf Course
- Par: 72
- Tour: PGA Tour
- Format: Stroke play
- Prize fund: US$100,000
- Final year: 1968

Tournament record score
- Aggregate: 264 Billy Casper (1962)
- To par: −20 as above

Final champion
- (United States) Billy Casper
- Location in United States Location in Indiana

The 500 Festival Open Invitation was a professional golf tournament on the PGA Tour, played during the 1960s in Indianapolis, Indiana. It was sponsored by The 500 Festival, a not-for-profit volunteer organization created in 1957 to organize civic events to promote the Indianapolis 500.

The tournament was played at the Speedway Golf Course, located in the Indianapolis Motor Speedway complex; the exception was in 1965, when it was played at Greentree Country Club while the Speedway was undergoing renovations.

== Tournament highlights ==
In 1961 Doug Ford won on the second hole of a sudden-death playoff over Arnold Palmer.

In 1963 the Indianapolis 500 was held on Thursday May 30, and the tournament was held over four days from Friday, May 31 to Monday, June 3. Previously the golf tournament was held prior to the running of the race. The one-day turnaround required grounds crews to quickly clean up the nine holes inside the track, used on race day for parking by fans. Considerable attention was given to the fact that several top names on the PGA Tour decided to skip the event. Among the reasons cited was the low purse, and the overall unchallenging nature of the course.

In 1964 the tournament was held from Wednesday, May 27 through Friday, May 29, then concluded Sunday May 31. The Indianapolis 500 was held Saturday May 30. Gary Player sank a birdie putt on the final hole to clinch the victory.

The 1965 tournament was held at Greentree Country Club. The Speedway Golf Course was undergoing a renovation project. In 1966 the tournament was moved out of the month of May and away from the activities directly surrounding the Indy 500. Billy Casper won the event three times while Doug Ford won it twice.

== Winners ==
Year	Winner	Score	To par	Margin of victory	Runner(s)-up	Winner's share ($)	Ref.
1968	(United States) Billy Casper (3)	280	−8	1 stroke	(United States) Frank Beard (United States) Mike Hill	20,000	
1967	(United States) Frank Beard	279	−9	3 strokes	(United States) Rod Funseth (United States) Rives McBee	20,000	
1966	(United States) Billy Casper (2)	277	−11	3 strokes	(United States) R. H. Sikes	16,400	
1965	(Australia) Bruce Crampton	279	−5	1 stroke	(United States) Jacky Cupit (United States) Lionel Hebert	15,200	
1964	(South Africa) Gary Player	273	−11	1 stroke	(United States) Doug Sanders (United States) Art Wall Jr.	12,000	
1963	(United States) Dow Finsterwald	268	−16	2 strokes	(United States) Tommy Aaron (United States) Julius Boros (United States) Tony Lema (United States) Bobby Nichols	10,000	
1962	(United States) Billy Casper	264	−20	1 stroke	(United States) George Bayer (United States) Jerry Steelsmith	9,000	
1961	(United States) Doug Ford (2)	273	−11	Playoff	(United States) Arnold Palmer	9,000	
1960	(United States) Doug Ford	270	−14	2 strokes	(United States) Jerry Barber	9,000	

== See also ==
- 500 Ladies Classic – LPGA Tour event held in June 1968
- Brickyard Crossing Championship – senior tour event was played from 1994 to 2000
- Indy Women in Tech Championship – LPGA Tour event from 2017 to 2019
