= 1966 PGA Tour =

Golf tour season

1966 PGA Tour season
- Duration: January 6, 1966 – November 27, 1966
- Number of official events: 40
- Most wins: (United States) Billy Casper (4)
- Money list: (United States) Billy Casper
- PGA Player of the Year: (United States) Billy Casper

The 1966 PGA Tour was the 51st season of the PGA Tour, the main professional golf tour in the United States.

== Schedule ==
The following table lists official events during the 1966 season.

| Date | Tournament | Location | Purse (US$) | Winner (Note: The number in parentheses after each winner's name is the number of PGA Tour events they had won up to and including that tournament. This information is only shown for PGA Tour members.) | Notes |
|---|---|---|---|---|---|
| Jan 9 | Los Angeles Open | California | 70,000 | (United States) Arnold Palmer (46) | |
| Jan 16 | San Diego Open Invitational | California | 45,000 | (United States) Billy Casper (29) | |
| Jan 23 | Bing Crosby National Pro-Am | California | 104,500 | (United States) Don Massengale (1) | Pro-Am |
| Jan 31 | Lucky International Open | California | 57,000 | (United States) Ken Venturi (14) | |
| Feb 6 | Bob Hope Desert Classic | California | 80,000 | (United States) Doug Sanders (15) | Pro-Am |
| Feb 14 | Phoenix Open Invitational | Arizona | 60,000 | (United States) Dudley Wysong (1) | |
| Feb 20 | Tucson Open Invitational | Arizona | 45,000 | (United States) Joe Campbell (3) | |
| Mar 7 | Pensacola Open Invitational | Florida | 50,000 | (United States) Gay Brewer (7) | |
| Mar 13 | Doral Open Invitational | Florida | 100,000 | (United States) Phil Rodgers (4) | |
| Mar 20 | Florida Citrus Open Invitational | Florida | 110,000 | (United States) Lionel Hebert (5) | New tournament |
| Mar 27 | Jacksonville Open | Florida | 82,000 | (United States) Doug Sanders (16) | |
| Apr 3 | Greater Greensboro Open | North Carolina | 100,000 | (United States) Doug Sanders (17) | |
| Apr 11 | Masters Tournament | Georgia | 100,000 | (United States) Jack Nicklaus (18) | Major championship |
| Apr 17 | Azalea Open Invitational | North Carolina | 22,800 | (United States) Bert Yancey (1) | Alternate event |
| Apr 18 | Tournament of Champions | Nevada | 100,000 | (United States) Arnold Palmer (47) | Winners-only event |
| Apr 26 | Dallas Open Invitational | Texas | 85,000 | (Argentina) Roberto De Vicenzo (5) | |
| May 1 | Texas Open Invitational | Texas | 80,000 | (South Africa) Harold Henning (1) | |
| May 16 | Greater New Orleans Open Invitational | Louisiana | 100,000 | (United States) Frank Beard (3) | |
| May 22 | Colonial National Invitation | Texas | 110,000 | (Australia) Bruce Devlin (2) | Invitational |
| May 29 | Oklahoma City Open Invitational | Oklahoma | 42,500 | (United States) Tony Lema (12) | |
| Jun 5 | Memphis Open Invitational | Tennessee | 100,000 | (United States) Bert Yancey (2) | |
| Jun 12 | Buick Open Invitational | Michigan | 100,000 | (United States) Phil Rodgers (5) | |
| Jun 20 | U.S. Open | California | 150,000 | (United States) Billy Casper (30) | Major championship |
| Jun 26 | Western Open | Illinois | 100,000 | (United States) Billy Casper (31) | |
| Jul 9 | The Open Championship | Scotland | £15,000 | (United States) Jack Nicklaus (19) | Major championship (Note: Unofficial money event at the time, but retrospectively counted as an official win.) |
| Jul 17 | Minnesota Golf Classic | Minnesota | 100,000 | (United States) Bobby Nichols (7) | |
| Jul 24 | PGA Championship | Ohio | 150,000 | (United States) Al Geiberger (4) | Major championship |
| Jul 31 | 500 Festival Open Invitation | Indiana | 100,000 | (United States) Billy Casper (32) | |
| Aug 7 | Cleveland Open | Ohio | 100,000 | (United States) R. H. Sikes (2) | |
| Aug 14 | Thunderbird Classic | New Jersey | 100,000 | (United States) Mason Rudolph (4) | |
| Aug 21 | Insurance City Open Invitational | Connecticut | 100,000 | (United States) Art Wall Jr. (13) | |
| Aug 28 | Philadelphia Golf Classic | Pennsylvania | 110,000 | (United States) Don January (5) | |
| Sep 3 | Carling World Open | England | 175,000 | (Australia) Bruce Devlin (3) | |
| Sep 18 | Portland Open Invitational | Oregon | 50,000 | (United States) Bert Yancey (3) | |
| Sep 25 | Greater Seattle-Everett Classic | Washington | 50,000 | (United States) Homero Blancas (1) | |
| Oct 2 | Canadian Open | Canada | 100,000 | (United States) Don Massengale (2) | |
| Oct 15 | Sahara Invitational | Nevada | 100,000 | (United States) Jack Nicklaus (20) | |
| Oct 30 | Hawaiian Open | Hawaii | 42,500 | (United States) Ted Makalena (1) | |
| Nov 20; ~~May 8~~ | Houston Champions International | Texas | 110,000 | (United States) Arnold Palmer (48) | |
| Nov 27 | Cajun Classic Open Invitational | Louisiana | 34,500 | (United States) Jacky Cupit (4) | |

=== Unofficial events ===
The following events were sanctioned by the PGA Tour, but did not carry official money, nor were wins official.

| Date | Tournament | Location | Purse ($) | Winner(s) | Notes |
|---|---|---|---|---|---|
| Nov 14 | Canada Cup | Japan | 6,300 | (United States) Jack Nicklaus and (United States) Arnold Palmer | Team event |
| Nov 14 | Canada Cup Individual Trophy | Japan | 6,300 | (Canada) George Knudson | |

== Money list ==
The money list was based on prize money won during the season, calculated in U.S. dollars.

| Position | Player | Prize money ($) |
|---|---|---|
| 1 | (United States) Billy Casper | 121,945 |
| 2 | (United States) Jack Nicklaus | 111,419 |
| 3 | (United States) Arnold Palmer | 110,468 |
| 4 | (United States) Doug Sanders | 80,096 |
| 5 | (United States) Gay Brewer | 75,688 |
| 6 | (United States) Phil Rodgers | 68,360 |
| 7 | (United States) Gene Littler | 68,345 |
| 8 | (United States) R. H. Sikes | 67,349 |
| 9 | (United States) Frank Beard | 66,041 |
| 10 | (United States) Al Geiberger | 63,220 |

== Awards ==
| Award | Winner | Ref. |
|---|---|---|
| PGA Player of the Year | (United States) Billy Casper | |
| Scoring leader (Vardon Trophy) | (United States) Billy Casper | |
