= Baton Rouge Open Invitational =

Golf tournament formerly on the PGA Tour

Tournament information
- Location: Baton Rouge, Louisiana
- Established: 1952
- Course: Baton Rouge Country Club
- Par: 72
- Tour: PGA Tour
- Format: Stroke play
- Prize fund: US$20,000
- Month played: March
- Final year: 1962

Tournament record score
- Aggregate: 266 Arnold Palmer (1961)
- To par: −14 Arnold Palmer (1961) −14 Joe Campbell (1962)

Final champion
- (United States) Joe Campbell
- Location in the United States Location in Louisiana

The Baton Rouge Open Invitational, first played as The Baton Rouge Open, was a PGA Tour event that was played in Baton Rouge, Louisiana in the 1950s and early 1960s. It was played at the Baton Rouge Country Club every year except 1961 when the event was played at Sherwood Forest Country Club. The Baton Rouge Country Club's par-72, 18-hole "Baton Rouge" course was designed by Joseph S. Finger and opened in 1916.

== Winners ==
Year	Winner	Score	To par	Margin of victory	Runner(s)-up	Winner's share ($)
Baton Rouge Open Invitational
1962	(United States) Joe Campbell	274	−14	2 strokes	(United States) Bob Rosburg	2,800
1961	(United States) Arnold Palmer (2)	266	−14	7 strokes	(United States) Wes Ellis	2,800
1960	(United States) Arnold Palmer	279	−9	7 strokes	(United States) Jay Hebert (United States) Ron Reif (United States) Doug Sanders	2,000
1959	(United States) Howie Johnson	283	−5	1 stroke	(United States) Jay Hebert	2,000
1958	(United States) Ken Venturi	276	−12	4 strokes	(United States) Lionel Hebert (United States) Arnold Palmer	2,000
1957	(United States) Jimmy Demaret	278	−10	1 stroke	(Australia) Peter Thomson	2,000
Baton Rouge Open
1956	(United States) Shelley Mayfield	277	−11	3 strokes	(United States) Walter Burkemo (United States) Jimmy Demaret (United States) Doug Ford (United States) Fred Haas (United States) Fred Hawkins	2,200
1955	(United States) Bo Wininger	278	−10	Playoff	(United States) Jimmy Clark (United States) Billy Maxwell	2,200
1954	(United States) Bob Toski	279	−9	1 stroke	(Australia) Jim Ferrier (United States) Chandler Harper (United States) Ted Kroll	2,000
1953	(United States) Sam Snead	275	−13	3 strokes	(United States) Dick Mayer	2,000
1952	(United States) Jack Burke Jr.	281	−7	Playoff	(United States) Tommy Bolt (United States) Bill Nary	2,000
