= Ernie Gonzalez =

American professional golfer (1961–2020)

Personal information
- Nationality: United States
- Born: February 19, 1961 San Diego, California, U.S.
- Died: May 15, 2020 (aged 59) Chicago, Illinois, U.S.
- Height: 5 ft 8 in (1.73 m)
- Weight: 210 lb (95 kg; 15 st)

Career
- Sport: Golf
- College: United States International University
- Turned professional: 1983
- Former tours: PGA Tour; Canadian Tour
- Professional wins: 2

Number of wins by tour
- PGA Tour: 1
- Other: 1

Best results in major championships
- Masters Tournament: CUT: 1987
- PGA Championship: CUT: 1987
- U.S. Open: CUT: 1987
- The Open Championship: DNP

Ernie Gonzalez (February 19, 1961 – May 15, 2020) was an American professional golfer who played on the PGA Tour in the 1980s. He won the only title of his career in 1986. By doing so, he became only the third left-handed golfer to win a Tour event.

== Early life and amateur career ==
Gonzalez was born in Chula Vista, California, a suburb of San Diego, on February 19, 1961. His father was of Mexican descent and his mother was Puerto Rican.

Gonzalez attended the United States International University, where he played on the golf team.

== Professional career ==
In 1983, Gonzalez turned professional.

Gonzalez played full-time on the PGA Tour from 1985 to 1989. He shot a 14-under-par 128 to edge Joey Sindelar by one stroke to win the rain-shortened 36-hole Pensacola Open in 1986 for his only Tour victory. The win by Gonzalez was the first by a left-handed golfer on the PGA Tour since Bob Charles at the 1974 Greater Greensboro Open. He also became only the third left-hander ever to win an event on Tour, after Charles and Sam Adams.

Gonzalez was friends with Phil Mickelson, a fellow left-hander and San Diegan. In 1988, Gonzalez's penultimate season on the Tour, he helped organize a practice round for Mickelson with Seve Ballesteros. This occurred during Mickelson's first PGA Tour event at the Shearson Lehman Hutton Andy Williams Open, where Mickelson entered as an amateur.

After losing his Tour card, Gonzalez worked as a golf instructor and a warehouseman at Wirtz Beverage Nevada. He has also played in a limited number of Nationwide Tour events, and in select PGA Tour events using exemptions. He lived with his family in Las Vegas, where he was employed at a beverage distributorship. The only event on the PGA Tour Champions that he participated in after turning 50 was the 2011 Senior Open Championship. However, he did not make the cut.

== Personal life ==
Gonzalez was married to Judy. Their son, David, was born in 1992, and Gonzalez later became teetotal to set a good example for him. His nephew was Brian Smock, who also played on the PGA Tour. Gonzalez was a Christian and attended Shadow Hills Baptist Church.

Gonzalez died on May 15, 2020, at a hospital in Chicago. He was 59, and had been suffering from complications of Alzheimer's disease.

== Professional wins (2) ==
=== PGA Tour wins (1) ===
No.	Date	Tournament	Winning score	Margin of victory	Runner-up
1	Oct 12, 1986	Pensacola Open	−14 (65-63=128) (Note: Shortened to 36 holes due to weather.)	1 stroke	(United States) Joey Sindelar

=== Canadian Tour wins (1) ===
No.	Date	Tournament	Winning score	Margin of victory	Runners-up
1	Aug 26, 1990	Canadian Tournament Players Championship	−10 (70-66-71-67=274)	1 stroke	(Canada) Dave Barr, (United States) Gene Elliott

== Results in major championships ==
Tournament	1987
Masters Tournament	CUT
U.S. Open	CUT
PGA Championship	CUT

CUT = missed the half-way cut
Note: Gonzalez never played in The Open Championship.

== Results in The Players Championship ==
Tournament	1987
The Players Championship	CUT

CUT = missed the half-way cut

== See also ==
- 1984 PGA Tour Qualifying School graduates
- 1985 PGA Tour Qualifying School graduates
