= Coral Gables Open Invitational =

Golf tournament in Florida, US

Tournament information
- Location: Coral Gables, Florida
- Established: 1931
- Course: Miami Biltmore Golf Course
- Par: 71
- Tour: PGA Tour
- Format: Stroke play
- Prize fund: US$20,000
- Month played: December
- Final year: 1962

Tournament record score
- Aggregate: 272 Bob Goalby (1960)
- To par: −12 as above

Final champion
- (United States) Gardner Dickinson
- Location in the United States Location in Florida

The Coral Gables Open Invitational was a golf tournament on the PGA Tour from 1931 to 1937 and 1959 to 1962. It was played at what is now the Miami Biltmore Golf Course in Coral Gables, Florida. It was also known as the Miami Biltmore Open in the 1930s.

== Winners ==
Year	Winner	Score	To par	Margin of victory	Runner(s)-up	Winner's share ($)	Ref
Coral Gables Open Invitational
1962	(United States) Gardner Dickinson	274	−10	1 stroke	(United States) Bill Collins (United States) Don Fairfield	2,800	
1961	(Canada) George Knudson	273	−11	1 stroke	(United States) Gay Brewer	2,800	
1960	(United States) Bob Goalby	272	−12	1 stroke	(United States) Dow Finsterwald	2,800	
1959	(United States) Doug Sanders	273	−11	3 strokes	(United States) Dow Finsterwald	2,880	
Miami Biltmore Open
1938–1958: No tournament
1937	(United States) Johnny Revolta	282		1 stroke	(United States) Dick Metz (United States) Jimmy Thomson	2,500	
1936	(United States) Ralph Guldahl	281		4 strokes	(United States) Horton Smith	2,500	
1935	(United States) Horton Smith	281	−3	3 strokes	(United States) Ky Laffoon (United States) Ted Turner	2,500	
1934	(United States) Olin Dutra	292		2 strokes	(United States) Mike Turnesa	1,200	
1933 (Dec)	(Scotland) Willie Macfarlane	288		4 strokes	(United States) Johnny Revolta	2,500	
1933 (Mar)	(United States) Paul Runyan	266	−18	10 strokes	(United States) Charlie Guest	1,000	
1932 (Nov)	(United States) Denny Shute	291	+7	1 stroke	(United States) Johnny Revolta	2,500	
Coral Gables Open
1932 (Mar)	(United States) Gene Sarazen	287		1 stroke	(United States) Walter Hagen (United States) Paul Runyan	2,500	
1931	(United States) Henry Ciuci (United States) Walter Hagen	143		Title shared		$350 (each)	
