= Dave Ragan =

American golfer, PGA Tour member, college golf coach (1945–2018)

Personal information
- Full name: David William Ragan, Jr.
- Nationality: United States
- Born: August 7, 1935 Daytona Beach, Florida, U.S.
- Died: March 13, 2018 (aged 82)
- Height: 5 ft 11 in (1.80 m)
- Weight: 185 lb (84 kg; 13.2 st)

Career
- Sport: Golf
- College: University of Florida
- Turned professional: 1956
- Former tours: PGA Tour; Champions Tour
- Professional wins: 9

Number of wins by tour
- PGA Tour: 3
- Other: 6

Best results in major championships
- Masters Tournament: T25: 1960, 1962
- PGA Championship: 2nd: 1963
- U.S. Open: T12: 1963
- The Open Championship: DNP

David William Ragan, Jr. (August 7, 1935 – March 13, 2018) was an American professional golfer who played on the PGA Tour and the Senior PGA Tour.

== Early life and amateur career ==
In 1935, Ragan was born in Daytona Beach, Florida.

For college, Ragan attended the University of Florida in Gainesville, Florida where he played for the Florida Gators men's golf team in National Collegiate Athletic Association (NCAA) competition from 1954 to 1956. During his time as a Gator golfer, he was a member of the Gators team that finished sixth in the NCAA national tournament in 1955, and won the first two Southeastern Conference (SEC) championships in team history in 1955 and 1956. As a senior in 1956, he won the SEC individual championship, and was recognized as an All-American. Ragan was later inducted into the University of Florida Athletic Hall of Fame as a "Gator Great."

== Professional career ==
In 1956, Ragan turned professional and played on the PGA Tour in the late 1950s and 1960s, winning three times. He finished second to Jack Nicklaus in the 1963 PGA Championship. He was a member of the 1963 Ryder Cup team.

In the early 1980s, he was the coach for the Tennessee Temple Crusaders golf team of Tennessee Temple University in Chattanooga, Tennessee. He was also the coach of the Ragin' Cajuns golf team at University of Southwestern Louisiana in Lafayette, Louisiana. From 1984 to 1986, he worked in partnership with Jack Wall and Bobby Greenwood at the Master's School of Golf. He played sparingly on the Senior PGA Tour starting in 1987.

Golf Digest magazine recognized Ragan as one of the top golf instructors in the state of Alabama in 2007. He worked for many years as a teaching pro at Inverness Country Club in Birmingham, Alabama. He taught at Pine Tree Country Club in Irondale, AL (near Birmingham) from 1995 to 1998.

== Personal life ==
Ragan has two sons. His son, Dave III, is a teaching pro in Miami. Another one of his sons, Chuck Ragan, is a singer/songwriter, as well as the frontman for the punk rock group Hot Water Music.

Ragan died on March 13, 2018, aged 82 years.

== Awards and honors ==
- In 1956, as a senior in college, Ragan earned All-American honors.
- In 1969, Ragan was inducted into the University of Florida Athletic Hall of Fame as a "Gator Great."

== Professional wins (9) ==
=== PGA Tour (3) ===
No.	Date	Tournament	Winning score	Margin of victory	Runner(s)-up
1	Jun 7, 1959	Eastern Open Invitational	−15 (69-68-66-70=273)	1 stroke	(United States) Gene Littler
2	Nov 4, 1962	Beaumont Open Invitational	−5 (70-72-71-70=283)	3 strokes	(United States) Dow Finsterwald, (United States) Lionel Hebert, (United States) Don Massengale
3	Dec 2, 1962	West Palm Beach Open Invitational	−11 (70-72-67-68=277)	Playoff	(United States) Doug Sanders

PGA Tour playoff record (1–0)

No.	Year	Tournament	Opponent	Result
1	1962	West Palm Beach Open Invitational	(United States) Doug Sanders	Won with birdie on second extra hole

=== Other (6) ===
This list is possibly incomplete

- 1956 Florida Open (as an amateur)
- 1957 Waterloo Open Golf Classic (tie with J. C. Goosie)
- 1961 Haig & Haig Scotch Foursome (with Mickey Wright)
- 1962 Florida PGA Championship
- 1963 Haig & Haig Scotch Foursome (with Mickey Wright), Senior Service Tournament

== U.S. national team appearances ==
Professional

- Ryder Cup: 1963 (winners)

== See also ==
- List of American Ryder Cup golfers
- List of Florida Gators men's golfers on the PGA Tour
- List of University of Florida alumni
- List of University of Florida Athletic Hall of Fame members
