= Bahamas National Open =

Golf tournament formerly on the PGA Tour

Tournament information
- Location: Freeport, Bahamas
- Established: 1970
- Course: Lucayan Country Club
- Par: 71
- Tour: PGA Tour
- Format: Stroke play
- Prize fund: US$130,000
- Month played: December
- Final year: 1971

Tournament record score
- Aggregate: 272 Chris Blocker (1970); 272 Doug Sanders (1970)
- To par: −16 as above

Final champion
- (United States) Bob Goalby
- Location in the Bahamas

The Bahamas National Open was a professional golf tournament on the PGA Tour in 1970 and 1971. It replaced the West End Classic, which had been a satellite Latin-American Tour stop, as the PGA's tournament in the Bahamas.

In 1970, the tournament was played as the Bahama Islands Open over the Emerald Course at Kings Inn & Golf Club in Freeport, Bahamas and won by Doug Sanders in a playoff. The following year, it was hosted at Lucayan Country Club in Freeport, Bahamas and won by Bob Goalby. The tournament appeared on the tour schedule again in 1972, but was cancelled.

== Winners ==
Year	Winner	Score	To par	Margin of victory	Runner-up	Venue	Ref.
Bahamas National Open
1972	Cancelled due to lack of funding						
1971	(United States) Bob Goalby	275	−9	1 stroke	(United States) George Archer	Lucayan	
Bahama Islands Open
1970	(United States) Doug Sanders	272	−16	Playoff	(United States) Chris Blocker	Kings (Emerald)	

== See also ==
- Open golf tournament
