= Thunderbird Classic =

Golf tournament formerly on the PGA Tour

Tournament information
- Location: Clifton, New Jersey
- Established: 1962
- Course: Upper Montclair Country Club
- Par: 71
- Tour: PGA Tour
- Format: Stroke play
- Prize fund: US$150,000
- Month played: August/September
- Final year: 1968

Tournament record score
- Aggregate: 270 Jack Nicklaus (1965)
- To par: −18 as above

Final champion
- (United States) Bob Murphy
- Location in the United States Location in New Jersey

The Thunderbird Classic was a golf tournament on the PGA Tour from 1962 to 1968. It was played at two locations, the Upper Montclair Country Club in Clifton, New Jersey in 1962 and 1966–68 and the Westchester Country Club in Rye, New York in 1963–65.

== Winners ==
Year	Winner	Score	To par	Margin of victory	Runner(s)-up	Ref.
Thunderbird Classic
1968	(United States) Bob Murphy	277	−11	3 strokes	(Australia) Bruce Crampton (United States) Bob Lunn	
1967	(United States) Arnold Palmer (2)	283	−5	1 stroke	(United States) Charles Coody (United States) Jack Nicklaus (United States) Art Wall Jr.	
1966	(United States) Mason Rudolph	278	−10	1 stroke	(United States) Jack Nicklaus	
1965	(United States) Jack Nicklaus	270	−18	2 strokes	(South Africa) Gary Player	
1964	(United States) Tony Lema	276	−12	1 stroke	(United States) Mike Souchak	
Thunderbird Classic Invitational
1963	(United States) Arnold Palmer	277	−11	Playoff	(United States) Paul Harney	
1962	(United States) Gene Littler	275	−13	2 strokes	(United States) Jack Nicklaus	
