= Beaumont Open Invitational =

Golf tournament formerly on the PGA Tour

Tournament information
- Location: Beaumont, Texas
- Established: 1961
- Course: Tyrrell Park Municipal Golf Course
- Par: 72
- Length: 6,656 yards (6,086 m)
- Tour: PGA Tour
- Format: Stroke play
- Prize fund: US$20,000
- Month played: November
- Final year: 1962

Tournament record score
- Aggregate: 277 Joe Campbell (1961)
- To par: −7 as above

Final champion
- (United States) Dave Ragan
- Location in the United States Location in Texas

The Beaumont Open Invitational was a golf tournament on the PGA Tour that played for two years in the early 1960s at the Tyrrell Park Municipal Golf Course in Beaumont, Texas, an 18-hole, par-72, 6,656 yard city-owned course.

The 1961 event was won on November 12 by 26-year-old Joe Campbell by one stroke over Beaumont native Bert Weaver. This was his first PGA Tour win. The 1962 event was won on November 4 by 27-year-old Dave Ragan by three strokes over Dow Finsterwald, Don Massengale, and third round leader Lionel Hebert.

The winner's share was $2,800 out of a total purse of $20,000 in both years.

== Winners ==
Year	Winner	Score	To par	Margin of victory	Runner(s)-up
1962	(United States) Dave Ragan	283	−5	3 strokes	(United States) Dow Finsterwald (United States) Lionel Hebert (United States) Don Massengale
1961	(United States) Joe Campbell	277	−7	1 stroke	(United States) Bert Weaver
