= Tennessee PGA Championship =

The Tennessee PGA Championship is a golf tournament that is the championship of the Tennessee section of the PGA of America. Gibby Gilbert (three-time PGA Tour winner) and Joe Campbell (three-time PGA tour winner) share the record for most wins with five each. Other PGA tour winners who were also victorious in the Tennessee PGA Championship include Mason Rudolph (five-time PGA tour winner) and Bert Weaver.

== Winners ==
- 2026 Johan Kok
- 2025 Ryan Botts
- 2024 Josh Bevell
- 2023 Casey Flenniken
- 2022 Casey Flenniken
- 2021 Loren Personett
- 2020 Johan Kok
- 2019 Johan Kok
- 2018 Johan Kok
- 2017 Johan Kok
- 2016 Oliver Peacock
- 2015 Loren Personett
- 2014 Scott Moran
- 2013 Kelvin Burgin
- 2012 Scott Moran
- 2011 Audie Johnson
- 2010 Kip Henley
- 2009 Scott Moran
- 2008 Kelvin Burgin
- 2007 Kelvin Burgin
- 2006 Kelvin Burgin
- 2005 Kip Henley
- 2004 Rob Hessing
- 2003 Loren Personett
- 2002 Bob Boyle
- 2001 Bob Boyle
- 2000 Sam Adams
- 1999 Randy Helton
- 1998 Bobby Bray
- 1997 Art Whaley
- 1996 Art Whaley
- 1995 Don Jones
- 1994 Kip Henley
- 1993 Kip Henley
- 1992 Walt Chapman
- 1991 Randy Helton
- 1990 Gibby Gilbert
- 1989 Bobby Bray
- 1988 Gibby Gilbert
- 1987 Gibby Gilbert
- 1986 Gibby Gilbert
- 1985 Gary Robinson
- 1984 Waddy Stokes
- 1983 Gary Robinson
- 1982 Bobby Bray
- 1981 Mike Nixon
- 1980 Mike Nixon
- 1979 Gibby Gilbert
- 1978 Jimmy Paschal
- 1977 Greg Powers
- 1976 Gary Robinson
- 1975 Bert Weaver
- 1974 Greg Powers
- 1973 Bob Wolfe
- 1972 Joe Campbell
- 1971 Larry Gilbert
- 1970 Joe Campbell
- 1969 Mason Rudolph
- 1968 Carroll Armstrong
- 1967 Joe Campbell
- 1966 Joe Campbell
- 1965 Joe Campbell
