= Golf Club of Houston =

Private golf club near Humble, Texas

- Location within the United States Location within Texas
- 29.924°N 95.261°W

Club information
- Location: near Humble, Texas, U.S.
- Elevation: 65 feet (20 m)
- Established: 2003; 23 years ago
- Type: Public (Tournament Course) Private (Member Course)
- Total holes: 18
- Tournaments: Houston Open (2003–2019); Balcones Cup (2019); LIV Golf Houston (2024-)
- Greens: Poa trivialis / Bentgrass
- Fairways: Perennial Ryegrass
- Website: Golf Club of Houston
- Designed by: Rees Jones
- Par: 72
- Length: 7,422 yards (6,787 m)
- Course rating: 76.0
- Slope rating: 144

The Golf Club of Houston is a private golf club in unincorporated Harris County, Texas, near Humble and northeast of Houston. The club contains two 18-hole courses; the Member Course is private, while the Tournament Course is open to the public. The Tournament Course was designed by Rees Jones and tour pro David Toms.

The club hosted the Houston Open from 2003–2019.

== History ==
The original 18-hole golf course on the location was El Dorado Country Club. It was designed by George Fazio in 1964, and included a log cabin style clubhouse, which had been a private home, and a small swimming pool surrounded by tall pine trees. El Dorado Country Club was closed in the early 1990s, a victim of a suffering Houston economy following the oil bust. The original clubhouse was demolished.

The Redstone Golf Club was then established in 2002. The first phase of Redstone Golf Club opened in July 2002 with a new 18-hole course designed by Jacobsen-Hardy Golf Design. It also included clubhouse facilities, maintenance facilities, and restaurant.

The club was purchased by Escalante Golf of Fort Worth in April 2013 and renamed that December to the Golf Club of Houston.

== Scorecard ==
Golf Club Of Houston - Tournament Course
Tee	Rating/Slope	1	2	3	4	5	6	7	8	9	Out	10	11	12	13	14	15	16	17	18	In	Total
Tournament	75.8 / 138	395	429	392	565	467	460	173	564	238	3683	382	440	335	588	215	609	199	487	484	3739	7422
Championship	73.5 / 132	381	412	373	528	433	392	157	545	217	3438	372	420	313	572	199	575	177	443	458	3529	6967
Club	71.4 / 125	366	393	350	517	391	362	145	522	196	3242	342	389	295	556	165	563	158	417	442	3327	6569
Regular	68.0 / 117	350	303	328	459	327	326	124	502	169	2888	275	369	258	542	144	510	139	391	410	3038	5926
SI		17	11	9	7	1	3	15	5	13		16	10	18	8	14	6	12	2	4
Par		4	4	4	5	4	4	3	5	3	36	4	4	4	5	3	5	3	4	4	36	72
Forward	70.1 / 115	327	271	311	429	291	289	106	453	145	2622	259	349	238	478	105	483	119	372	356	2759	5381
