= 1966 Open Championship =

Coordinates: 56.043°N 2.823°W

Tournament information
- Dates: 6–9 July 1966
- Location: Gullane, Scotland
- Course: Muirfield Golf Links

Statistics
- Par: 71
- Length: 6,887 yards (6,297 m)
- Field: 130 players, 64 after cut
- Cut: 150 (+8)
- Prize fund: £15,000 $42,000
- Winner's share: £2,100 $5,880

Champion
- (United States) Jack Nicklaus
- 282 (−2)

Location in Scotland
Location in East Lothian, Scotland

The 1966 Open Championship was the 95th Open Championship, held 6–9 July at Muirfield Golf Links in Gullane, East Lothian, Scotland. Jack Nicklaus won the first of his three Claret Jugs, one stroke ahead of runners-up Doug Sanders and Dave Thomas. It was the sixth of eighteen major titles for Nicklaus and marked the completion of the first of his three career grand slams.

This was the first Open to be scheduled over four days, with one round each day, finishing on Saturday. Previous editions had played the third and fourth rounds on Friday. The U.S. Open changed to a four-day schedule the previous year in 1965, moving its final round from Saturday afternoon to Sunday. The Open Championship operated on a Wednesday through Saturday schedule through 1979.

It was the final Open for 1964 champion Tony Lema, who died in a plane crash two weeks later, hours after the PGA Championship.

Nicklaus has described Muirfield as "the best golf course in Britain." He later developed a championship golf course and community in Dublin, Ohio, a suburb north of his hometown of Columbus. Opened in 1974, Nicklaus named it Muirfield Village and it hosts his Memorial Tournament, a top invitational event on the PGA Tour since 1976.

== Course ==
| Hole | 1 | 2 | 3 | 4 | 5 | 6 | 7 | 8 | 9 | Out | 10 | 11 | 12 | 13 | 14 | 15 | 16 | 17 | 18 | In | Total |
|---|---|---|---|---|---|---|---|---|---|---|---|---|---|---|---|---|---|---|---|---|---|
| Yards | 429 | 363 | 385 | 187 | 516 | 473 | 187 | 451 | 495 | 3,486 | 475 | 363 | 385 | 154 | 462 | 407 | 198 | 528 | 429 | 3,401 | 6,887 |
| Par | 4 | 4 | 4 | 3 | 5 | 4 | 3 | 4 | 5 | 36 | 4 | 4 | 4 | 3 | 4 | 4 | 3 | 5 | 4 | 35 | 71 |

Lengths of the course for previous Opens (since 1950):

- 1959: 6,806 yards (6,223 m), par 72

== Round summaries ==
=== First round ===
Wednesday, 6 July 1966

| Place | Player | Score | To par |
|---|---|---|---|
| T1 | (England) Jimmy Hitchcock | 70 | −1 |
| T1 | (United States) Jack Nicklaus | 70 | −1 |
| T3 | (South Africa) Harold Henning | 71 | E |
| T3 | (United States) Tony Lema | 71 | E |
| T3 | (United States) Doug Sanders | 71 | E |
| T3 | (Scotland) Ronnie Shade (a) | 71 | E |
| T7 | (England) Fred Boobyer | 72 | +1 |
| T7 | (England) John Carter | 72 | +1 |
| T7 | (England) Alex Caygill | 72 | +1 |
| T7 | (Republic of Ireland) Christy Greene | 72 | +1 |
| T7 | (Australia) Kel Nagle | 72 | +1 |
| T7 | (South Africa) Gary Player | 72 | +1 |
| T7 | (Wales) Dave Thomas | 72 | +1 |

=== Second round ===
Thursday, 7 July 1966

| Place | Player | Score | To par |
|---|---|---|---|
| 1 | (United States) Jack Nicklaus | 70-67=137 | −5 |
| 2 | (England) Peter Butler | 73-65=138 | −4 |
| T3 | (South Africa) Harold Henning | 71-69=140 | −2 |
| T3 | (Australia) Kel Nagle | 72-68=140 | −2 |
| T3 | (United States) Phil Rodgers | 74-66=140 | −2 |
| T6 | (United States) Doug Sanders | 71-70=141 | −1 |
| T6 | (Scotland) Ronnie Shade (a) | 71-70=141 | −1 |
| 8 | (Australia) Bruce Devlin | 73-69=142 | E |
| 9 | (England) Alex Caygill | 72-71=143 | +1 |
| 10 | (United States) Julius Boros | 73-71=144 | +2 |

Amateurs: Shade (-1), Cole (+4), Townsend (+6), Bonallack (+7),
Millensted (+12), Smith (+13), Falkenburg (+22)

=== Third round ===
Friday, 8 July 1966

| Place | Player | Score | To par |
|---|---|---|---|
| 1 | (United States) Phil Rodgers | 74-66-70=210 | −3 |
| 2 | (United States) Jack Nicklaus | 70-67-75=212 | −1 |
| 3 | (United States) Doug Sanders | 71-70-72=213 | E |
| T4 | (United States) Arnold Palmer | 73-72-69=214 | +1 |
| T4 | (Wales) Dave Thomas | 72-73-69=214 | +1 |
| 6 | (South Africa) Harold Henning | 71-69-75=215 | +2 |
| T7 | (England) Alex Caygill | 72-71-73=216 | +3 |
| T7 | (Australia) Bruce Devlin | 73-69-74=216 | +3 |
| T7 | (Spain) Sebastián Miguel | 74-72-70=216 | +3 |
| T7 | (Australia) Kel Nagle | 72-68-76=216 | +3 |
| T7 | (Scotland) Ronnie Shade (a) | 71-70-75=216 | +3 |

=== Final round ===
Saturday, 9 July 1966

| Place | Player | Score | To par | Money (£) |
|---|---|---|---|---|
| 1 | (United States) Jack Nicklaus | 70-67-75-70=282 | −2 | 2,100 |
| T2 | (United States) Doug Sanders | 71-70-72-70=283 | −1 | 1,350 |
| T2 | (Wales) Dave Thomas | 72-73-69-69=283 | −1 | 1,350 |
| T4 | (Australia) Bruce Devlin | 73-69-74-70=286 | +2 | 696 |
| T4 | (Australia) Kel Nagle | 72-68-76-70=286 | +2 | 696 |
| T4 | (South Africa) Gary Player | 72-74-71-69=286 | +2 | 696 |
| T4 | (United States) Phil Rodgers | 74-66-70-76=286 | +2 | 696 |
| T8 | (United States) Dave Marr | 73-76-69-70=288 | +4 | 330 |
| T8 | (Spain) Sebastián Miguel | 74-72-70-72=288 | +4 | 330 |
| T8 | (United States) Arnold Palmer | 73-72-69-74=288 | +4 | 330 |
| T8 | (Australia) Peter Thomson | 73-75-69-71=288 | +4 | 330 |

Amateurs: Shade (+9), Townsend (+11), Bonallack (+13), Cole (+14)
