= Greater Jacksonville Open =

Golf tournament formerly on the PGA Tour

Tournament information
- Location: Lauderhill, Florida
- Established: 1945
- Course: Inverrary Country Club
- Par: 72
- Tour: PGA Tour
- Format: Stroke play
- Prize fund: US$175,000
- Month played: March
- Final year: 1976

Tournament record score
- Aggregate: 264 Sam Snead (1946)
- To par: −24 as above

Final champion
- (United States) Hubert Green
- Location in the United States Location in Florida

The Greater Jacksonville Open was a PGA Tour event that was played from 1945 until 1976.

Shortly after World War II, the Jacksonville Open began play as a PGA Tour event in Jacksonville, Florida at the Hyde Park Golf Club until it was discontinued in the mid-1950s. In the mid-1960s, the PGA Tour came to town again. This time the event was initially named the Jacksonville Open again and changed for the 1968 event to the Jacksonville Open Invitational. The name was changed to the Greater Jacksonville Open for the 1969 event.

The Greater Jacksonville Open was discontinued after the 1976 tournament when the PGA Tour decided to relocate The Players Championship to Ponte Vedra Beach, Florida. The PGA Tour had been looking for some time for a permanent home for the marquee event which has professional golf's highest prize fund and is sometimes referred to as the "fifth major". The Players Championship had been played at the Atlanta Country Club in Marietta, Georgia in 1974, the Colonial Country Club in Fort Worth in 1975 and at the Inverrary Country Club in Ft. Lauderdale in 1976. The Greater Jacksonville Open laid the groundwork and provided much of the infrastructure for the modern Players Championship, which was first played in Ponte Vedra Beach in 1977.

== Tournament highlights ==
- 1947: During his third round, Ben Hogan scores eleven on the par-3 6th hole.
- 1952: At the end of regulation play, Doug Ford and Sam Snead were tied for the lead. An 18-hole playoff was scheduled for the next day but rather than play, Snead forfeited. The forfeit stemmed from a ruling Snead received during the tournament's second round of play. On the 10th hole, Snead's drive landed behind an out of bounds stake. While Chick Harbert who was playing with Snead thought the ball was out of bounds, a rules official ruled differently due to the starter not telling players the stakes had been moved since the previous day's play had ended. Afterwards Snead explained why he forfeited even though Ford suggested they play sudden death for the title. "I want to be fair about it. I don't want anyone to think I took advantage of the ruling."
- 1965: Bert Weaver wins the first modern version of the tournament. He finishes one shot ahead of Bruce Devlin, Jack Nicklaus, Bob Charles, and Dave Marr.
- 1966: Jack Nicklaus makes a double eagle on the tournament's final hole but can finish no better than tied for eighth. Doug Sanders is the winner by one shot over Gay Brewer.
- 1967: Jacksonville native Dan Sikes wins by one shot over Bill Collins.
- 1968: Tony Jacklin becomes the first English golfer to win on the PGA Tour. He finishes two shots ahead of DeWitt Weaver, Chi-Chi Rodríguez, Doug Sanders, and Don January.
- 1972: Tony Jacklin takes home his second Jacksonville title via a sudden death playoff win over John Jacobs. No Englishman would win a PGA Tour event on US soil again till Nick Faldo triumphed at the 1983 Sea Pines Heritage.
- 1975: Larry Ziegler shoots a final round 65 to win by two shots over Mike Morley and Mac McLendon.
- 1976: Hubert Green wins the last edition of the tournament. He finishes two shots ahead of Miller Barber.

== Winners ==
Year	Winner	Score	To par	Margin of victory	Runner(s)-up
Greater Jacksonville Open
1976	(United States) Hubert Green (2)	276	−12	2 strokes	(United States) Miller Barber
1975	(United States) Larry Ziegler	276	−12	2 strokes	(United States) Mac McLendon (United States) Mike Morley
1974	(United States) Hubert Green	276	−12	3 strokes	(United States) John Mahaffey
1973	(United States) Jim Colbert	279	−9	1 stroke	(United States) Lou Graham (United States) Johnny Miller (United States) Dan Sikes (United States) Jim Wiechers
1972	(England) Tony Jacklin (2)	283	−5	Playoff	(United States) John Jacobs
1971	(South Africa) Gary Player	281	−7	Playoff	(United States) Hal Underwood
1970	(United States) Don January	279	−9	Playoff	(United States) Dale Douglass
1969	(United States) Raymond Floyd	278	−10	Playoff	(United States) Gardner Dickinson
Jacksonville Open Invitational
1968	(England) Tony Jacklin	273	−15	2 strokes	(United States) Gardner Dickinson (United States) Don January (United States) Chi-Chi Rodríguez (United States) Doug Sanders (United States) DeWitt Weaver
Jacksonville Open
1967	(United States) Dan Sikes	279	−9	1 stroke	(United States) Bill Collins
1966	(United States) Doug Sanders	273	−15	1 stroke	(United States) Gay Brewer
1965	(United States) Bert Weaver	285	−3	1 stroke	(New Zealand) Bob Charles (Australia) Bruce Devlin (United States) Dave Marr (United States) Jack Nicklaus
1954–1964: No tournament
1953	(United States) Lew Worsham	272	−16	1 stroke	(Australia) Jim Ferrier
1952	(United States) Doug Ford	280	−8	Playoff	(United States) Sam Snead
1951	(Australia) Jim Ferrier	272	−16	11 strokes	(United States) Lloyd Mangrum (United States) Jack Shields
1950	(United States) Cary Middlecoff (2)	279	−9	2 strokes	(United States) George Fazio
1949	(United States) Cary Middlecoff	274	−10	2 strokes	(United States) Jerry Barber
1948	(United States) Chick Harbert	284	−4	1 stroke	(United States) Skip Alexander (United States) Vic Ghezzi
1947	(United States) Clayton Heafner	281	−3	Playoff	(United States) Lew Worsham
1946	(United States) Sam Snead (2)	264	−24	4 strokes	(United States) Jimmy Demaret
1945	(United States) Sam Snead	266	−22	4 strokes	(United States) Bob Hamilton
