= Oklahoma City Open Invitational =

Golf tournament formerly on the PGA Tour

Oklahoma City Open
Tournament information
- Location: Oklahoma City, Oklahoma
- Established: 1926
- Course: The Greens Country Club
- Par: 70
- Tour: PGA Tour
- Format: Stroke play
- Prize fund: US$54,000
- Month played: May
- Final year: 1978

Tournament record score
- Aggregate: 257 Michael Kim (2018)
- To par: −27 as above

Final champion
- (United States) Jeff Hewes
- Location in the United States Location in Oklahoma

The Oklahoma City Open Invitational was a golf tournament on the PGA Tour that played at various clubs in Oklahoma City. The tournament first played in the 1920s under the name Oklahoma City Open.

After a hiatus of nearly three decades, the PGA Tour returned to Oklahoma City in the 1950s. The 1962–1967 events were held at Quail Creek Golf & Country Club.

== Tournament hosts ==
Years	Course
1962–67	Quail Creek Golf & Country Club
1956, 1959–60	Twin Hills Golf & Country Club
1926–29	Oklahoma City Golf & Country Club

== Winners ==
Year	Tour (Note: PGAT − PGA Tour.)	Winner	Score	To par	Margin of victory	Runner(s)-up
Oklahoma City Open
1978		(United States) Jeff Hewes	282	+2	5 strokes	(United States) Jack Spradlin (United States) Tom Jones
1977		(United States) Tom Storey	278	−2	1 stroke	(United States) Bob Erickson
1968–1976: No tournament
Oklahoma City Open Invitational
1967	PGAT	(United States) Miller Barber	278	−10	Playoff	(South Africa) Gary Player
1966	PGAT	(United States) Tony Lema	271	−17	6 strokes	(United States) Tom Weiskopf
1965	PGAT	(United States) Jack Rule Jr.	283	−5	1 stroke	(United States) Bobby Nichols
1964	PGAT	(United States) Arnold Palmer (2)	277	−11	2 strokes	(United States) Lionel Hebert
1963	PGAT	(United States) Don Fairfield	280	−8	1 stroke	(United States) Julius Boros
1962	PGAT	(United States) Doug Sanders	280	−8	2 strokes	(United States) Johnny Pott
1961: No tournament
1960	PGAT	(United States) Gene Littler	273	−11	1 stroke	(United States) Art Wall Jr.
1959	PGAT	(United States) Arnold Palmer	273	−15	2 strokes	(United States) Bob Goalby
1957–1959: No tournament
Oklahoma City Open
1956	PGAT	(United States) Fred Hawkins	279	−9	2 strokes	(United States) Gardner Dickinson
1930–1955: No tournament
1929		(United States) Craig Wood				
1928		(United States) Horton Smith				
1927		(England) Harry Cooper				
1926		(United States) Al Espinosa				
