= Sedgefield Country Club =

American country club

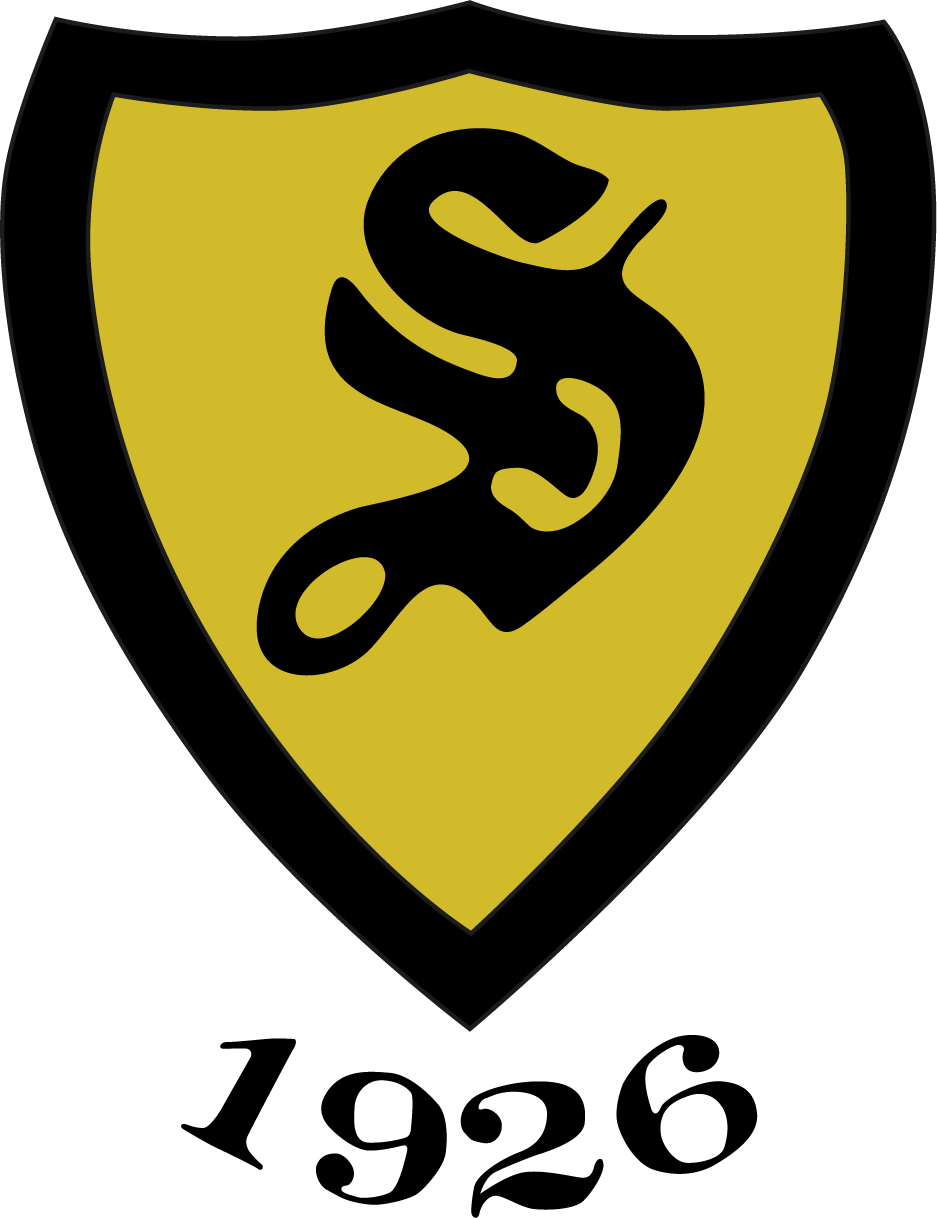

- Location within the United States Location within North Carolina
- 36.014°N 79.887°W

Club information
- Location: Greensboro, North Carolina
- Elevation: 830 feet (250 m)
- Established: 1926; 100 years ago
- Type: Private
- Owner: McConnell Golf LLC
- Total holes: 18
- Tournaments: GO by Raymond James
- Greens: Champion Bermuda
- Fairways: Tifway 419 Bermuda
- Website: sedgefieldcc.com

Ross Course
- Designed by: Donald Ross
- Par: 70
- Length: 7,127 yards (6,517 m)
- Course rating: 75.3
- Slope rating: 143
- Course record: 59 (Brandt Snedeker, 2018 Wyndham Championship)
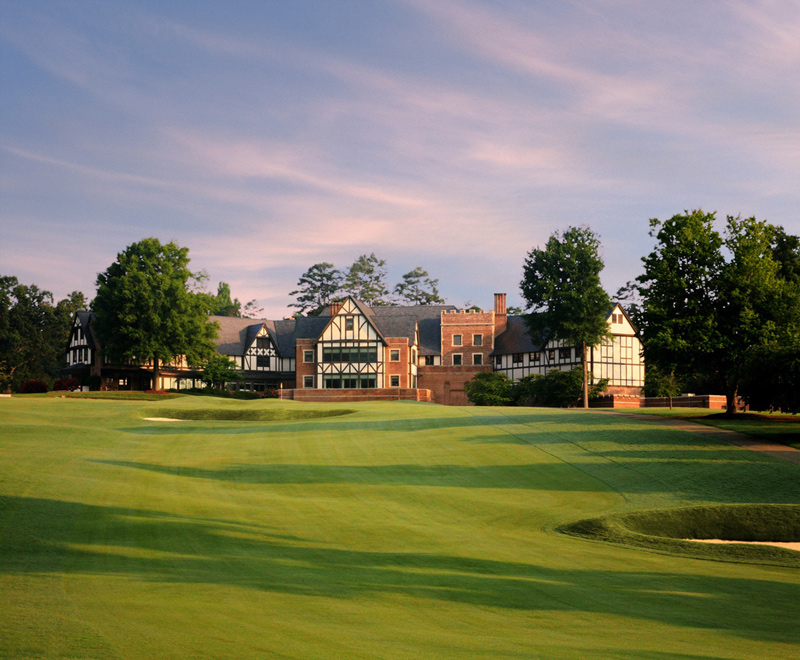
- Sedgefield's Tudor-style clubhouse viewed from the ninth fairway in 2024.

Sedgefield Country Club is a country club in the eastern United States, located in Greensboro, North Carolina, southwest of the city center. Established in 1926, it is primarily known for its golf course and the PGA Tour event it has held annually since 2008: the GO by Raymond James, most recently known as the Wyndham Championship. It also hosted the tournament from 1938 to 1976 (alternating some years with Starmount Forest Country Club).

The course was designed by Donald Ross and opened for play in 1926. Along with Detroit Golf Club, they are currently the only two Ross-designed courses hosting a regular event on the PGA Tour. The Ross course originally featured Bentgrass greens, but in 2007, a major $3 million restoration project replaced them with Champion Bermuda Grass greens and restored the fairways with Tifway 419 Bermuda grass. In 2011, McConnell Golf acquired Sedgefield Country Club and added new membership benefits, including reciprocal access to the 14 other McConnell Golf properties.

From 2003 until 2021, Rocky Brooks of the PGA served as director of golf at Sedgefield. He was succeeded by Eric Ferguson who now serves as the director of golf.

== Course ==
2026 Wyndham Championship

| Hole | Yards | Par | Hole | Yards | Par |
|---|---|---|---|---|---|
| 1 | 418 | 4 | 10 | 440 | 4 |
| 2 | 442 | 4 | 11 | 486 | 4 |
| 3 | 174 | 3 | 12 | 235 | 3 |
| 4 | 428 | 4 | 13 | 405 | 4 |
| 5 | 529 | 5 | 14 | 505 | 4 |
| 6 | 423 | 4 | 15 | 545 | 5 |
| 7 | 223 | 3 | 16 | 175 | 3 |
| 8 | 374 | 4 | 17 | 406 | 4 |
| 9 | 416 | 4 | 18 | 507 | 4 |
| Out | 3,427 | 35 | In | 3,704 | 35 |
| Source: | | | Total | 7,131 | 70 |

- The approximate average elevation is 830 feet (255 m) above sea level.
