= 1962 PGA Tour =

Golf tour season

1962 PGA Tour season
- Duration: January 5, 1962 – December 9, 1962
- Number of official events: 49
- Most wins: (United States) Arnold Palmer (8)
- Money list: (United States) Arnold Palmer
- PGA Player of the Year: (United States) Arnold Palmer

The 1962 PGA Tour was the 47th season of the PGA Tour, the main professional golf tour in the United States.

== Schedule ==
The following table lists official events during the 1962 season.

Date	Tournament	Location	Purse (US$)	Winner (Note: The number in parentheses after each winner's name is the number of PGA Tour events they had won up to and including that tournament. This information is only shown for PGA Tour members.)	Notes
Jan 8	Los Angeles Open	California	45,000	(United States) Phil Rodgers (1)	
Jan 14	San Diego Open Invitational	California	25,000	(United States) Tommy Jacobs (2)	
Jan 22	Bing Crosby National Pro-Am	California	50,000	(United States) Doug Ford (17)	Pro-Am
Jan 28	Lucky International Open	California	50,000	(United States) Gene Littler (18)	
Feb 4	Palm Springs Golf Classic	California	35,000	(United States) Arnold Palmer (28)	Pro-Am
Feb 11	Phoenix Open Invitational	Arizona	35,000	(United States) Arnold Palmer (29)	
Feb 18	Tucson Open Invitational	Arizona	20,000	(United States) Phil Rodgers (2)	
Feb 25	Greater New Orleans Open Invitational	Louisiana	30,000	(United States) Bo Wininger (4)	
Mar 4	Baton Rouge Open Invitational	Louisiana	20,000	(United States) Joe Campbell (2)	
Mar 11	Pensacola Open Invitational	Florida	20,000	(United States) Doug Sanders (9)	
Mar 19	St. Petersburg Open Invitational	Florida	20,000	(United States) Bobby Nichols (1)	
Mar 26	Doral C.C. Open Invitational	Florida	50,000	(United States) Billy Casper (15)	New tournament
Apr 1	Azalea Open	North Carolina	20,000	(United States) Dave Marr (2)	
Apr 9	Masters Tournament	Georgia	110,000	(United States) Arnold Palmer (30)	Major championship
Apr 15	Greater Greensboro Open	North Carolina	35,000	(United States) Billy Casper (16)	
Apr 23	Houston Classic	Texas	50,000	(United States) Bobby Nichols (2)	
Apr 29	Texas Open Invitational	Texas	30,000	(United States) Arnold Palmer (31)	
May 6	Tournament of Champions	Nevada	50,000	(United States) Arnold Palmer (32)	Winners-only event
May 6	Waco Turner Open	Oklahoma	20,000	(United States) Johnny Pott (3)	Alternate event
May 14	Colonial National Invitation	Texas	40,000	(United States) Arnold Palmer (33)	Invitational
May 20	Hot Springs Open Invitational	Arkansas	20,000	(Canada) Al Johnston (1)	
May 27	500 Festival Open Invitation	Indiana	50,000	(United States) Billy Casper (17)	
Jun 3	Memphis Open Invitational	Tennessee	40,000	(United States) Lionel Hebert (4)	
Jun 10	Thunderbird Classic Invitational	New Jersey	100,000	(United States) Gene Littler (19)	New tournament
Jun 17	U.S. Open	Pennsylvania	75,000	(United States) Jack Nicklaus (1)	Major championship
Jun 24	Eastern Open Invitational	Maryland	35,000	(United States) Doug Ford (18)	
Jul 1	Western Open	Illinois	55,000	(United States) Jacky Cupit (2)	
Jul 8	Buick Open Invitational	Michigan	50,000	(United States) Bill Collins (4)	
Jul 13	The Open Championship	Scotland	£8,500	(United States) Arnold Palmer (34)	Major championship (Note: Unofficial money event at the time, but retrospectively counted as an official win.)
Jul 15	Motor City Open	Michigan	35,000	(Australia) Bruce Crampton (2)	Alternate event
Jul 22	PGA Championship	Pennsylvania	70,000	(South Africa) Gary Player (6)	Major championship
Jul 29	Canadian Open	Canada	30,000	(United States) Ted Kroll (8)	
Aug 5	Insurance City Open Invitational	Connecticut	35,000	(United States) Bob Goalby (5)	
Aug 12	American Golf Classic	Ohio	50,000	(United States) Arnold Palmer (35)	
Aug 19	St. Paul Open Invitational	Minnesota	30,000	(United States) Doug Sanders (10)	
Aug 26	Oklahoma City Open Invitational	Oklahoma	35,000	(United States) Doug Sanders (11)	
Sep 3	Dallas Open Invitational	Texas	35,000	(United States) Billy Maxwell (7)	
Sep 9	Denver Open Invitational	Colorado	30,000	(United States) Bob Goalby (6)	
Sep 16	Seattle World's Fair Open Invitational	Washington	30,000	(United States) Jack Nicklaus (2)	
Sep 23	Portland Open Invitational	Oregon	25,000	(United States) Jack Nicklaus (3)	
Oct 14	Bakersfield Open Invitational	California	40,000	(United States) Billy Casper (18)	
Oct 21	Ontario Open Invitational	California	25,000	(United States) Al Geiberger (1)	
Oct 28	Orange County Open Invitational	California	20,000	(United States) Tony Lema (2)	
Nov 4	Beaumont Open Invitational	Texas	20,000	(United States) Dave Ragan (2)	
Nov 11	Cajun Classic Open Invitational	Louisiana	17,500	(United States) John Barnum (1)	
Nov 18	Mobile Sertoma Open Invitational	Alabama	11,500	(United States) Tony Lema (3)	
Nov 25	Carling Open Invitational	Florida	35,000	(United States) Bo Wininger (5)	
Dec 2	West Palm Beach Open Invitational	Florida	20,000	(United States) Dave Ragan (3)	
Dec 9	Coral Gables Open Invitational	Florida	20,000	(United States) Gardner Dickinson (3)	

=== Unofficial events ===
The following events were sanctioned by the PGA Tour, but did not carry official money, nor were wins official.

Date	Tournament	Location	Purse ($)	Winner(s)	Notes
Sep 30	Sahara Invitational	Nevada	20,000	(United States) Tony Lema	
Nov 11	Canada Cup	Argentina	6,300	(United States) Arnold Palmer and (United States) Sam Snead	Team event
Nov 11	Canada Cup Individual Trophy	Argentina	6,300	(Argentina) Roberto De Vicenzo	

== Money list ==
The money list was based on prize money won during the season, calculated in U.S. dollars.

Position	Player	Prize money ($)
1	(United States) Arnold Palmer	81,448
2	(United States) Gene Littler	66,201
3	(United States) Jack Nicklaus	61,869
4	(United States) Billy Casper	61,842
5	(United States) Bob Goalby	46,241
6	(South Africa) Gary Player	45,838
7	(United States) Doug Sanders	43,340
8	(United States) Dave Ragan	37,327
9	(United States) Bobby Nichols	34,312
10	(United States) Phil Rodgers	32,182

== Awards ==
Award	Winner	Ref.
PGA Player of the Year	(United States) Arnold Palmer	
Scoring leader (Vardon Trophy)	(United States) Arnold Palmer	
