= Cajun Classic Open Invitational =

Golf tournament formerly on the PGA Tour

Coordinates: 30.217°N 91.978°W

Tournament information
- Location: Lafayette, Louisiana
- Established: 1958
- Course: Oakbourne Country Club
- Par: 72
- Length: 6,555 yards (5,994 m)
- Tour: PGA Tour
- Format: Stroke play
- Prize fund: US$25,000
- Month played: November
- Final year: 1968

Tournament record score
- Aggregate: 270 Doug Sanders (1961); 270 John Barnum (1962); 270 Ron Cerrudo (1968)
- To par: −18 Ron Cerrudo (1968)

Final champion
- (United States) Ron Cerrudo
- Location in the United States Location in Louisiana

The Cajun Classic Open Invitational was a golf tournament in Louisiana on the PGA Tour in the late 1950s and 1960s, played at the Oakbourne Country Club in Lafayette, usually in late November. It debuted as the Lafayette Open Invitational in 1958, and in many years was the last tournament on the PGA Tour schedule, which attracted players fighting for position on the money list.

John Barnum, the only man in the history of the PGA Tour to earn his first win after age 50, won this event in 1962 at age 51. Barnum was also the first player to win on Tour using a Ping putter.

The 1963 tournament began on Thursday, November 21, but during the second round the following day, news of the assassination of President John F. Kennedy swept the course. Saturday's play was postponed in deference to the news, with the tournament finishing on Sunday with the final two rounds being played.

It lost the last tournament slot on the 1969 schedule and the resulting smaller field caused monetary problems that resulted in the tournament folding.

== Winners ==
Year	Winner	Score	To par	Margin of victory	Runner(s)-up	Purse (US$)	Winner's share ($)	Ref.
Cajun Classic Open Invitational
1968	(United States) Ron Cerrudo	270	−18	4 strokes	(United States) Charlie Sifford	35,000	5,000	
1967	(United States) Marty Fleckman	275	−13	Playoff	(United States) Jack Montgomery	35,000	5,000	
1966	(United States) Jacky Cupit	271	−17	Playoff	(United States) Chi-Chi Rodríguez	34,500	4,850	
1965	(United States) Babe Hiskey	275	−13	Playoff	(United States) Dudley Wysong	32,000	4,250	
1964	(United States) Miller Barber	277	−7	5 strokes	(United States) Gay Brewer (United States) Jack Nicklaus	25,000	3,300	
1963	(United States) Rex Baxter	275	−13	2 strokes	(United States) Bob Shave Jr.	20,000	2,800	
1962	(United States) John Barnum	270	−14	6 strokes	(United States) Gay Brewer	17,500	2,400	
1961	(United States) Doug Sanders	270	−14	6 strokes	(United States) Ken Still	15,000	2,000	
1960	(United States) Lionel Hebert	272	−12	2 strokes	(United States) Jon Gustin (United States) Johnny Pott	15,000	2,000	
Lafayette Open Invitational
1959	(United States) Billy Casper	273	−11	4 strokes	(United States) George Bayer	15,000	2,000	
1958	(United States) Jay Hebert	275	−11	5 strokes	(United States) Leo Biagetti (United States) Bob Rosburg	15,000	2,000	
