= Phil Rodgers =

American professional golfer (1938–2018)

Personal information
- Nationality: United States
- Born: April 3, 1938 San Diego, California, U.S.
- Died: June 26, 2018 (aged 80) San Diego, California, U.S.
- Height: 5 ft 8 in (1.73 m)
- Weight: 175 lb (79 kg; 12.5 st)

Career
- Sport: Golf
- College: University of Houston
- Turned professional: 1961
- Former tours: PGA Tour; Senior PGA Tour
- Professional wins: 6

Number of wins by tour
- PGA Tour: 5
- Other: 1

Best results in major championships
- Masters Tournament: T7: 1974
- PGA Championship: T7: 1972
- U.S. Open: T3: 1962
- The Open Championship: 2nd: 1963

Phil Rodgers (April 3, 1938 – June 26, 2018) was an American professional golfer.

== Early life and amateur career ==
In 1938, Rodgers was born in San Diego, California. He won the 1958 NCAA Division I Championship while playing at the University of Houston. Immediately after, he was placed in the first position on the first team of the 1958 All-American golf team. The team included many future pros including Al Geiberger and Bobby Nichols and Tommy Aaron.

Shortly thereafter, Rodgers entered the Marine Corps. He won virtually every service tournament he played in. Rodgers was even pulled out of Boot Camp to play in the All Services tournament.

== Professional career ==
In 1961, Rodgers turned pro. He won five times on the PGA Tour in the 1960s. Playing sparingly in 1961, but winning the "unofficial" 54-hole Sahara Pro-Am in Las Vegas, Nevada, Rodgers started his first full year on the PGA Tour in 1962, which began with the Los Angeles Open. Tied for the lead after 54 holes with Fred Hawkins at 206, Rodgers ran away from the field shooting a 9-under-par 62 making 9 birdies and 9 pars to win his first championship by 9 strokes.

He lost to Bob Charles in a 36-hole playoff in the 1963 Open Championship. Rodgers also lost the 1962 U.S. Open by two strokes despite going 6-over-par on two holes. In the first round, he took a quadruple bogey 8 on the 17th hole, and 4-putted the 12th hole in the third round. Still, after chipping in for a birdie on the 12th hole in the final round, he stood at 2-under-par with six holes left, needing 6 pars to win. Instead he made 3 bogeys enabling Arnold Palmer and Jack Nicklaus to finish regulation play tied for first at 1-under-par. Nicklaus went on to win the playoff and scored his first victory as a professional.

After a stint on the Senior PGA Tour, Rodgers became a much sought-after teacher, specializing in the short game. One of his first pupils was Jack Nicklaus, who publicly credited Rodgers with teaching him more precise wedge play which helped him win his fourth U.S. Open championship in 1980 at age 40. For several years, Golf Magazine ranked Rodgers in their top 100 teachers.

== Personal life ==
Rodgers died in San Diego on June 26, 2018, from leukemia at the age of 80.

== Professional wins (6) ==
=== PGA Tour wins (5) ===
No.	Date	Tournament	Winning score	Margin of victory	Runner(s)-up
1	Jan 8, 1962	Los Angeles Open	−16 (67-71-68-62=268)	9 strokes	(United States) Bob Goalby, (United States) Fred Hawkins
2	Feb 18, 1962	Tucson Open Invitational	−17 (64-68-65-66=263)	3 strokes	(Australia) Jim Ferrier
3	Apr 28, 1963	Texas Open Invitational	−16 (66-71-66-65=268)	2 strokes	(United States) Johnny Pott
4	Mar 13, 1966	Doral Open Invitational	−10 (69-69-70-70=278)	1 stroke	(United States) Jay Dolan, (United States) Kermit Zarley
5	Jun 12, 1966	Buick Open Invitational	−4 (70-73-71-70=284)	2 strokes	(United States) Johnny Pott, (United States) Kermit Zarley

PGA Tour playoff record (0–2)

No.	Year	Tournament	Opponent	Result
1	1963	The Open Championship	(New Zealand) Bob Charles	Lost 36-hole playoff; Charles: E (69-71=140), Rodgers: +8 (72-76=148)
2	1965	Azalea Open Invitational	(United States) Dick Hart	Lost to par on eighth extra hole

=== Other wins (1) ===
this list may be incomplete

- 1961 Sahara Pro-Am

== Results in major championships ==
Tournament	1956	1957	1958	1959
Masters Tournament			22	CUT
U.S. Open	CUT			CUT
The Open Championship				
PGA Championship				

Tournament	1960	1961	1962	1963	1964	1965	1966	1967	1968	1969
Masters Tournament			CUT	CUT	T25		T17	T36		
U.S. Open			T3	T32		CUT	6	CUT		T13
The Open Championship			T3	2	T19	CUT	T4	T43		
PGA Championship			CUT	CUT			CUT	T28		T48

Tournament	1970	1971	1972	1973	1974	1975	1976	1977
Masters Tournament	CUT			23	T7	CUT		
U.S. Open	CUT					CUT	CUT	CUT
The Open Championship					CUT			
PGA Championship	T48	CUT	T7	T71				

Top 10
Did not play

CUT = missed the half-way cut (3rd round cut in 1962 PGA Championship)
"T" indicates a tie for a place

=== Summary ===
Tournament	Wins	2nd	3rd	Top-5	Top-10	Top-25	Events	Cuts made
Masters Tournament	0	0	0	0	1	5	11	6
U.S. Open	0	0	1	1	2	3	12	4
The Open Championship	0	1	1	3	3	3	7	5
PGA Championship	0	0	0	0	1	1	9	5
Totals	0	1	2	4	7	12	39	20

- Most consecutive cuts made – 4 (twice)
- Longest streak of top-10s – 2 (twice)
