= Bert Weaver =

American golfer (1932–2022)

Personal information
- Full name: Herbert Reese Weaver
- Nationality: United States
- Born: January 13, 1932 Beaumont, Texas, U.S.
- Died: May 3, 2022 (aged 90)

Career
- Sport: Golf
- College: Louisiana State University
- Turned professional: 1956
- Former tours: PGA Tour; Champions Tour
- Professional wins: 5

Number of wins by tour
- PGA Tour: 1
- Other: 4

Best results in major championships
- Masters Tournament: T31: 1965
- PGA Championship: T27: 1963
- U.S. Open: CUT: 1962, 1971, 1972
- The Open Championship: DNP

Herbert Reese Weaver (January 13, 1932 – May 3, 2022) was an American professional golfer who played on the PGA Tour and the Senior PGA Tour.

== Early life ==
A native of Beaumont, Texas, Weaver played collegiate golf at Louisiana State University.

== Professional career ==
In 1956, Weaver turned professional. He had second-place finishes at the 1961 Beaumont Open and the 1962 Carling Open before earning his first PGA Tour victory at the Jacksonville Open on March 21, 1965. The event was held at the Selva Marina Country club and was attended by 15,000 people. Weaver collected $8,500 for his efforts, and was the first male golfer from Beaumont to win a PGA Tour event. He was in the top 100 money winners upon retiring in 1968.

Weaver played on the Senior PGA Tour from 1982 to 1984. His best finishes were a pair of T-6 at the 1983 Marlboro Classic and the 1984 du Maurier Champions. In the late 1990s, Weaver worked as an official on the Senior PGA Tour.

== Professional wins (5) ==
=== PGA Tour wins (1) ===
No.	Date	Tournament	Winning score	Margin of victory	Runners-up
1	Mar 14, 1965	Jacksonville Open	−3 (70-70-73-72=285)	1 stroke	(New Zealand) Bob Charles, (Australia) Bruce Devlin, (United States) Dave Marr, (United States) Jack Nicklaus

=== Other wins (4) ===
- 1967 Panama Open
- 1968 Caracas Open
- 1971 Ford Maracaibo Open
- 1975 Tennessee PGA Championship
