= 1965 PGA Tour =

Golf tour season

1965 PGA Tour season
- Duration: January 8, 1965 – November 28, 1965
- Number of official events: 40
- Most wins: (United States) Jack Nicklaus (5)
- Money list: (United States) Jack Nicklaus
- PGA Player of the Year: (United States) Dave Marr

The 1965 PGA Tour was the 50th season of the PGA Tour, the main professional golf tour in the United States.

== Schedule ==
The following table lists official events during the 1965 season.

Date	Tournament	Location	Purse (US$)	Winner (Note: The number in parentheses after each winner's name is the number of PGA Tour events they had won up to and including that tournament. This information is only shown for PGA Tour members.)	Notes
Jan 11	Los Angeles Open	California	70,000	(United States) Paul Harney (5)	
Jan 17	San Diego Open Invitational	California	39,000	(United States) Wes Ellis (3)	
Jan 24	Bing Crosby National Pro-Am	California	84,500	(Australia) Bruce Crampton (4)	Pro-Am
Jan 31	Lucky International Open	California	57,000	(United States) George Archer (1)	
Feb 7	Bob Hope Desert Classic	California	80,000	(United States) Billy Casper (25)	Pro-Am
Feb 14	Phoenix Open Invitational	Arizona	65,000	(United States) Rod Funseth (1)	
Feb 21	Tucson Open Invitational	Arizona	46,000	(New Zealand) Bob Charles (3)	
Mar 7	Pensacola Open Invitational	Florida	50,000	(United States) Doug Sanders (13)	
Mar 14	Doral Open Invitational	Florida	70,000	(United States) Doug Sanders (14)	
Mar 21	Jacksonville Open	Florida	57,500	(United States) Bert Weaver (1)	
Mar 28	Azalea Open Invitational	North Carolina	28,750	(United States) Dick Hart (1)	
Apr 4	Greater Greensboro Open	North Carolina	70,000	(United States) Sam Snead (82)	
Apr 11	Masters Tournament	Georgia	100,000	(United States) Jack Nicklaus (13)	Major championship
Apr 18	Houston Classic	Texas	75,000	(United States) Bobby Nichols (6)	
Apr 25	Texas Open Invitational	Texas	50,000	(United States) Frank Beard (2)	
May 2	Tournament of Champions	Nevada	70,000	(United States) Arnold Palmer (45)	Winners-only event
May 11	Colonial National Invitation	Texas	100,000	(Australia) Bruce Crampton (5)	Invitational
May 16	Greater New Orleans Open Invitational	Louisiana	100,000	(United States) Dick Mayer (7)	
May 23	Memphis Open Invitational	Tennessee	60,000	(United States) Jack Nicklaus (14)	
May 30	500 Festival Open Invitation	Indiana	87,000	(Australia) Bruce Crampton (6)	
Jun 6	Buick Open Invitational	Michigan	100,000	(United States) Tony Lema (10)	
Jun 13	Cleveland Open Invitational	Ohio	135,000	(United States) Dan Sikes (2)	
Jun 21	U.S. Open	Missouri	125,000	(South Africa) Gary Player (10)	Major championship
Jun 27	St. Paul Open Invitational	Minnesota	100,000	(United States) Raymond Floyd (2)	
Jul 4	Western Open	Illinois	70,000	(United States) Billy Casper (26)	
Jul 9	The Open Championship	England	£10,000	(Australia) Peter Thomson (6)	Major championship (Note: Unofficial money event at the time, but retrospectively counted as an official win.)
Jul 17	Canadian Open	Canada	100,000	(United States) Gene Littler (20)	
Jul 25	Insurance City Open Invitational	Connecticut	70,000	(United States) Billy Casper (27)	
Aug 1	Thunderbird Classic	New York	100,000	(United States) Jack Nicklaus (15)	
Aug 8	Philadelphia Golf Classic	Pennsylvania	125,000	(United States) Jack Nicklaus (16)	
Aug 15	PGA Championship	Pennsylvania	150,000	(United States) Dave Marr (3)	Major championship
Aug 23	Carling World Open	Massachusetts	175,000	(United States) Tony Lema (11)	
Aug 29	American Golf Classic	Ohio	100,000	(United States) Al Geiberger (3)	
Sep 5	Oklahoma City Open Invitational	Oklahoma	50,000	(United States) Jack Rule Jr. (2)	
Sep 19	Portland Open Invitational	Oregon	50,000	(United States) Jack Nicklaus (17)	
Sep 26	Greater Seattle Open Invitational	Washington	45,000	(United States) Gay Brewer (5)	
Oct 23	Sahara Invitational	Nevada	100,000	(United States) Billy Casper (28)	
Oct 31	Almaden Open Invitational	California	46,000	(South Africa) Bobby Verwey (1)	
Nov 7	Hawaiian Open	Hawaii	45,000	(United States) Gay Brewer (6)	
Nov 28	Cajun Classic Open Invitational	Louisiana	32,000	(United States) Babe Hiskey (1)	

=== Unofficial events ===
The following events were sanctioned by the PGA Tour, but did not carry official money, nor were wins official.

Date	Tournament	Location	Purse ($)	Winner(s)	Notes
Oct 3	Canada Cup	Spain	n/a	(South Africa) Harold Henning and (South Africa) Gary Player	Team event
Oct 3	Canada Cup Individual Trophy	Spain	n/a	(South Africa) Gary Player	
Oct 9	Ryder Cup	England	n/a	Team USA	Team event

== Money list ==
The money list was based on prize money won during the season, calculated in U.S. dollars.

Position	Player	Prize money ($)
1	(United States) Jack Nicklaus	140,752
2	(United States) Tony Lema	101,816
3	(United States) Billy Casper	99,931
4	(United States) Doug Sanders	72,182
5	(South Africa) Gary Player	69,964
6	(Australia) Bruce Devlin	67,657
7	(United States) Dave Marr	63,375
8	(United States) Al Geiberger	59,699
9	(United States) Gene Littler	58,898
10	(United States) Arnold Palmer	57,770

== Awards ==
Award	Winner	Ref.
PGA Player of the Year	(United States) Dave Marr	
Scoring leader (Vardon Trophy)	(United States) Billy Casper	
