= 1967 PGA Tour =

Golf tour season

1967 PGA Tour season
- Duration: January 12, 1967 – December 3, 1967
- Number of official events: 40
- Most wins: (United States) Jack Nicklaus (5)
- Money list: (United States) Jack Nicklaus
- PGA Player of the Year: (United States) Jack Nicklaus

The 1967 PGA Tour was the 52nd season of the PGA Tour, the main professional golf tour in the United States.

== Schedule ==
The following table lists official events during the 1967 season.

Date	Tournament	Location	Purse (US$)	Winner (Note: The number in parentheses after each winner's name is the number of PGA Tour events they had won up to and including that tournament. This information is only shown for PGA Tour members.)	Notes
Jan 15	San Diego Open Invitational	California	71,000	(United States) Bob Goalby (7)	
Jan 23	Bing Crosby National Pro-Am	California	80,000	(United States) Jack Nicklaus (21)	Pro-Am
Jan 29	Los Angeles Open	California	100,000	(United States) Arnold Palmer (49)	
Feb 5	Bob Hope Desert Classic	California	88,000	(United States) Tom Nieporte (3)	Pro-Am
Feb 12	Phoenix Open Invitational	Arizona	70,000	(United States) Julius Boros (14)	
Feb 19	Tucson Open Invitational	Arizona	60,000	(United States) Arnold Palmer (50)	
Mar 5	Doral Open Invitational	Florida	100,000	(United States) Doug Sanders (18)	
Mar 12	Florida Citrus Open Invitational	Florida	115,000	(United States) Julius Boros (15)	
Mar 19	Jacksonville Open	Florida	100,000	(United States) Dan Sikes (3)	
Mar 26	Pensacola Open Invitational	Florida	75,000	(United States) Gay Brewer (8)	
Apr 2	Greater Greensboro Open	North Carolina	125,000	(United States) George Archer (2)	
Apr 9	Masters Tournament	Georgia	165,000	(United States) Gay Brewer (9)	Major championship
Apr 16	Tournament of Champions	Nevada	100,000	(United States) Frank Beard (4)	Winners-only event
Apr 16	Azalea Open Invitational	North Carolina	25,000	(United States) Randy Glover (1)	Alternate event
Apr 24	Dallas Open Invitational	Texas	100,000	(United States) Bert Yancey (4)	
Apr 30	Texas Open Invitational	Texas	100,000	(United States) Chi-Chi Rodríguez (4)	
May 7	Houston Champions International	Texas	115,000	(United States) Frank Beard (5)	
May 14	Greater New Orleans Open Invitational	Louisiana	100,000	(Canada) George Knudson (4)	
May 21	Colonial National Invitation	Texas	115,000	(United States) Dave Stockton (1)	Invitational
May 28	Oklahoma City Open Invitational	Oklahoma	66,000	(United States) Miller Barber (2)	
Jun 4	Memphis Open Invitational	Tennessee	100,000	(United States) Dave Hill (4)	
Jun 11	Buick Open Invitational	Michigan	100,000	(United States) Julius Boros (16)	
Jun 18	U.S. Open	New Jersey	170,000	(United States) Jack Nicklaus (22)	Major championship
Jun 25	Cleveland Open Invitational	Ohio	103,500	(United States) Gardner Dickinson (4)	
Jul 3	Canadian Open	Canada	100,000	(United States) Billy Casper (33)	
Jul 9	500 Festival Open Invitation	Indiana	100,000	(United States) Frank Beard (6)	
Jul 15	The Open Championship	England	£15,000	(Argentina) Roberto De Vicenzo (6)	Major championship (Note: Unofficial money event at the time, but retrospectively counted as an official win.)
Jul 24	PGA Championship	Colorado	150,000	(United States) Don January (6)	Major championship
Jul 30	Minnesota Golf Classic	Minnesota	100,000	(United States) Lou Graham (1)	
Aug 6	Western Open	Illinois	100,000	(United States) Jack Nicklaus (23)	
Aug 13	American Golf Classic	Ohio	100,000	(United States) Arnold Palmer (51)	
Aug 20	Greater Hartford Open Invitational	Connecticut	100,000	(United States) Charlie Sifford (1)	
Aug 30	Westchester Classic	New York	250,000	(United States) Jack Nicklaus (24)	New tournament
Sep 4	Carling World Open	Canada	175,000	(United States) Billy Casper (34)	
Sep 17	Philadelphia Golf Classic	Pennsylvania	110,000	(United States) Dan Sikes (4)	
Sep 24	Thunderbird Classic	New Jersey	150,000	(United States) Arnold Palmer (52)	
Oct 1	Atlanta Classic	Georgia	110,000	(New Zealand) Bob Charles (4)	
Oct 28	Sahara Invitational	Nevada	100,000	(United States) Jack Nicklaus (25)	
Nov 5	Hawaiian Open	Hawaii	100,000	(United States) Dudley Wysong (2)	
Dec 3	Cajun Classic Open Invitational	Louisiana	35,000	(United States) Marty Fleckman (1)	

=== Unofficial events ===
The following events were sanctioned by the PGA Tour, but did not carry official money, nor were wins official.

Date	Tournament	Location	Purse ($)	Winner(s)	Notes
Oct 22	Ryder Cup	Texas	n/a	Team USA	Team event
Nov 12	World Cup	Mexico	6,300	(United States) Jack Nicklaus and (United States) Arnold Palmer	Team event
Nov 12	World Cup Individual Trophy	Mexico	6,300	(United States) Arnold Palmer	

== Money list ==
The money list was based on prize money won during the season, calculated in U.S. dollars.

Position	Player	Prize money ($)
1	(United States) Jack Nicklaus	188,998
2	(United States) Arnold Palmer	184,065
3	(United States) Billy Casper	129,423
4	(United States) Julius Boros	126,786
5	(United States) Dan Sikes	111,509
6	(United States) Doug Sanders	109,455
7	(United States) Frank Beard	105,779
8	(United States) George Archer	84,344
9	(United States) Gay Brewer	78,549
10	(United States) Bob Goalby	77,107

== Awards ==
Award	Winner	Ref.
PGA Player of the Year	(United States) Jack Nicklaus	
Scoring leader (Vardon Trophy)	(United States) Arnold Palmer	
