= GO by Raymond James =

Golf tournament held in Greensboro, North Carolina

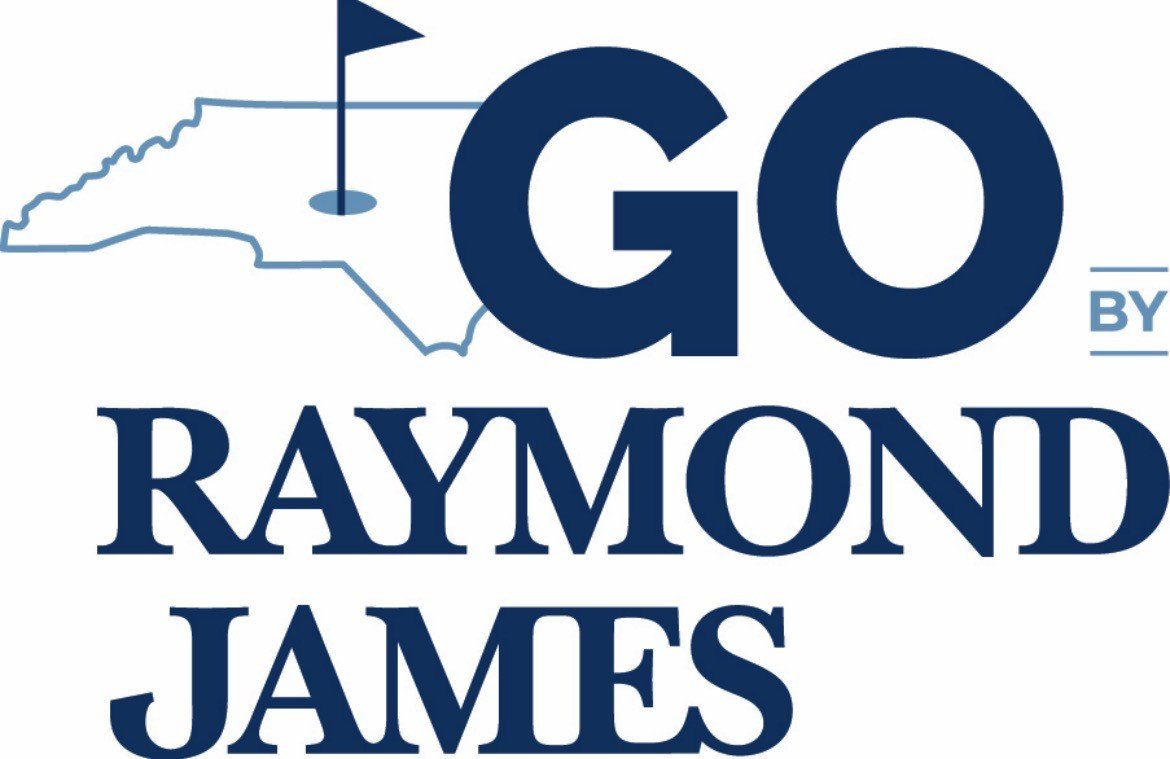

Tournament information
- Location: Greensboro, North Carolina
- Established: 1938; 88 years ago
- Courses: Sedgefield Country Club (Ross Course)
- Par: 70
- Length: 7,127 yards (6,517 m)
- Organized by: Piedmont Triad Charitable Foundation
- Tour: PGA Tour
- Format: Stroke play
- Prize fund: US$8,500,000
- Month played: August
- Website: gobyraymondjames.com

Tournament record score
- Aggregate: 258 Henrik Stenson (2017); 258 J. T. Poston (2019); 258 Cameron Young (2025); 258 Michael Brennan (2026)
- To par: −23 Jesper Parnevik (1999)

Current champion
- (United States) Michael Brennan

Location map
- Location in United States Location in North Carolina

GO by Raymond James is a professional golf tournament in North Carolina on the PGA Tour. It is played annually in Greensboro and was founded in 1938 as the Greater Greensboro Open. From 2007 to 2026, it was known as the Wyndham Championship.

== History ==
Founded 88 years ago in 1938 as the Greater Greensboro Open, it was usually played in April or May, until a schedule change in 2003 moved it toward the end of the season. At the age of 52, Sam Snead set PGA Tour records in 1965 for his eighth win at an event and as the oldest winner of a tournament; both records still stand. He won his 8th title 27 years after his first win in 1938. Davis Love III, the 2015 champion at age 51, is the oldest to win in the senior tour era, which began in 1980.

Charlie Sifford competed in 1961, and became the first African American permitted to play in a PGA-sponsored event in the South. He led after the first round, and tied for fourth.

In 2007, the event was renamed the Wyndham Championship when Wyndham Hotels & Resorts took over from DaimlerChrysler as title sponsor, and dropped "Greensboro" from the title. It moved from an autumn date to mid-August and is the last PGA Tour event before the FedEx Cup Playoffs, as one last chance to qualify for the FedEx Cup.

The purse for 2015 was $5.4 million, with a winner's share of $972,000.

On August 16, 2018, during the first round, Brandt Snedeker shot a 59. It was the tenth sub-60 round in the history of the PGA Tour, and just the third with a bogey. Snedeker shot a 27 on the inward nine, burying a twenty foot putt from the fringe to make history.

The 2021 event featured a six-way playoff for first place, which was won by Kevin Kisner. This tied the PGA Tour record for largest number of participants in a sudden-death playoff. This also occurred at the 1994 GTE Byron Nelson Golf Classic and the 2001 Nissan Open.

In August 2026, the tournament announced a new title sponsorship with Raymond James Financial, ending its 20 year title sponsorship with Wyndham Rewards following the 2026 tournament. Beginning in 2027, the event will be referred to as GO by Raymond James and will become part of the PGA Tour's Championship Series in 2028.

== Courses ==
The event has been played in the Greensboro area for its entire history. In its first four years, it was played at both Sedgefield Country Club and Starmount Forest Country Club. During World War II, it shifted solely to Starmount Forest in 1942, and was not held in 1943 and 1944. Starting in 1945, it alternated between Starmount Forest and Sedgefield until 1952, when Starmount Forest hosted for consecutive years.

It returned to Sedgefield in 1953 before Starmount Forest hosted for three consecutive years, (through 1956). Sedgefield hosted in 1957 and Starmount Forest hosted for another three straight years from 1958–60, then back to Sedgefield from 1961 to 1976. It shifted to Forest Oaks Country Club from 1977 to 2007, then returned to Sedgefield in 2008. The course at Sedgefield was designed by noted architect Donald Ross; it opened 100 years ago in 1926 and was restored in 2007.

=== Scorecard ===
2026 Wyndham Championship

| Hole | Yards | Par | Hole | Yards | Par |
|---|---|---|---|---|---|
| 1 | 418 | 4 | 10 | 440 | 4 |
| 2 | 442 | 4 | 11 | 486 | 4 |
| 3 | 174 | 3 | 12 | 235 | 3 |
| 4 | 428 | 4 | 13 | 405 | 4 |
| 5 | 529 | 5 | 14 | 505 | 4 |
| 6 | 423 | 4 | 15 | 545 | 5 |
| 7 | 223 | 3 | 16 | 175 | 3 |
| 8 | 374 | 4 | 17 | 406 | 4 |
| 9 | 416 | 4 | 18 | 507 | 4 |
| Out | 3,427 | 35 | In | 3,704 | 35 |
| Source: | | | Total | 7,131 | 70 |

- The approximate average elevation is 830 feet (255 m) above sea level.

== Winners ==
| Year | Winner | Score | To par | Margin of victory | Runner(s)-up | Purse (US$) | Winner's share ($) | Venue | Ref. |
GO by Raymond James
| 2027 | | | | | | | | Sedgefield | |
Wyndham Championship
| 2026 | (United States) Michael Brennan | 258 | −22 | 3 strokes | (United States) Beau Hossler | 8,500,000 | 1,530,000 | Sedgefield | |
| 2025 | (United States) Cameron Young | 258 | −22 | 6 strokes | (United States) Mac Meissner | 8,200,000 | 1,476,000 | Sedgefield | |
| 2024 | (England) Aaron Rai | 262 | −18 | 2 strokes | (United States) Max Greyserman | 7,900,000 | 1,422,000 | Sedgefield | |
| 2023 | (United States) Lucas Glover | 260 | −20 | 2 strokes | (South Korea) An Byeong-hun (United States) Russell Henley | 7,600,000 | 1,368,000 | Sedgefield | |
| 2022 | (South Korea) Tom Kim | 260 | −20 | 5 strokes | (United States) John Huh (South Korea) Im Sung-jae | 7,300,000 | 1,314,000 | Sedgefield | |
| 2021 | (United States) Kevin Kisner | 265 | −15 | Playoff | (South Africa) Branden Grace (South Korea) Kim Si-woo (United States) Kevin Na (Australia) Adam Scott (Canada) Roger Sloan | 6,400,000 | 1,152,000 | Sedgefield | |
| 2020 | (United States) Jim Herman | 259 | −21 | 1 stroke | (United States) Billy Horschel | 6,400,000 | 1,152,000 | Sedgefield | |
| 2019 | (United States) J. T. Poston | 258 | −22 | 1 stroke | (United States) Webb Simpson | 6,200,000 | 1,116,000 | Sedgefield | |
| 2018 | (United States) Brandt Snedeker (2) | 259 | −21 | 3 strokes | (Taiwan) Pan Cheng-tsung (United States) Webb Simpson | 6,000,000 | 1,080,000 | Sedgefield | |
| 2017 | (Sweden) Henrik Stenson | 258 | −22 | 1 stroke | (United States) Ollie Schniederjans | 5,800,000 | 1,044,000 | Sedgefield | |
| 2016 | (South Korea) Kim Si-woo | 259 | −21 | 5 strokes | (England) Luke Donald | 5,600,000 | 1,008,000 | Sedgefield | |
| 2015 | (United States) Davis Love III (3) | 263 | −17 | 1 stroke | (United States) Jason Gore | 5,400,000 | 972,000 | Sedgefield | |
| 2014 | (Colombia) Camilo Villegas | 263 | −17 | 1 stroke | (United States) Bill Haas (Sweden) Freddie Jacobson | 5,300,000 | 954,000 | Sedgefield | |
| 2013 | (United States) Patrick Reed | 266 | −14 | Playoff | (United States) Jordan Spieth | 5,300,000 | 954,000 | Sedgefield | |
| 2012 | (Spain) Sergio García | 262 | −18 | 2 strokes | (South Africa) Tim Clark | 5,200,000 | 936,000 | Sedgefield | |
| 2011 | (United States) Webb Simpson | 262 | −18 | 3 strokes | (United States) George McNeill | 5,200,000 | 936,000 | Sedgefield | |
| 2010 | (India) Arjun Atwal | 260 | −20 | 1 stroke | (United States) David Toms | 5,100,000 | 918,000 | Sedgefield | |
| 2009 | (United States) Ryan Moore | 264 | −16 | Playoff | (United States) Jason Bohn (United States) Kevin Stadler | 5,100,000 | 918,000 | Sedgefield | |
| 2008 | (Sweden) Carl Pettersson | 259 | −21 | 2 strokes | (United States) Scott McCarron | 5,100,000 | 918,000 | Sedgefield | |
| 2007 | (United States) Brandt Snedeker | 266 | −22 | 2 strokes | (United States) Billy Mayfair (United States) Jeff Overton (United States) Tim Petrovic | 5,000,000 | 900,000 | Forest Oaks | |
Chrysler Classic of Greensboro
| 2006 | (United States) Davis Love III (2) | 272 | −16 | 2 strokes | (United States) Jason Bohn | 5,000,000 | 900,000 | Forest Oaks | |
| 2005 | (South Korea) K. J. Choi | 266 | −22 | 2 strokes | (Japan) Shigeki Maruyama | 5,000,000 | 900,000 | Forest Oaks | |
| 2004 | (United States) Brent Geiberger | 270 | −18 | 2 strokes | (United States) Michael Allen | 4,600,000 | 828,000 | Forest Oaks | |
| 2003 | (Japan) Shigeki Maruyama | 266 | −22 | 5 strokes | (United States) Brad Faxon | 4,500,000 | 810,000 | Forest Oaks | |
Greater Greensboro Chrysler Classic
| 2002 | (United States) Rocco Mediate (2) | 272 | −16 | 3 strokes | (United States) Mark Calcavecchia | 3,800,000 | 684,000 | Forest Oaks | |
| 2001 | (United States) Scott Hoch | 272 | −16 | 1 stroke | (United States) Brett Quigley (United States) Scott Simpson | 3,500,000 | 630,000 | Forest Oaks | |
| 2000 | (United States) Hal Sutton | 274 | −14 | 3 strokes | (United States) Andrew Magee | 3,000,000 | 540,000 | Forest Oaks | |
| 1999 | (Sweden) Jesper Parnevik | 265 | −23 | 2 strokes | (United States) Jim Furyk | 2,600,000 | 468,000 | Forest Oaks | |
| 1998 | (Namibia) Trevor Dodds | 276 | −12 | Playoff | (United States) Scott Verplank | 2,200,000 | 396,000 | Forest Oaks | |
| 1997 | (New Zealand) Frank Nobilo | 274 | −14 | Playoff | (United States) Brad Faxon | 1,900,000 | 342,000 | Forest Oaks | |
| 1996 | (United States) Mark O'Meara | 274 | −14 | 2 strokes | (United States) Duffy Waldorf | 1,800,000 | 324,000 | Forest Oaks | |
KMart Greater Greensboro Open
| 1995 | (United States) Jim Gallagher Jr. | 274 | −14 | 1 stroke | (United States) Peter Jacobsen (United States) Jeff Sluman | 1,500,000 | 270,000 | Forest Oaks | |
| 1994 | (United States) Mike Springer | 275 | −13 | 3 strokes | (United States) Brad Bryant (United States) Ed Humenik (United States) Hale Irwin | 1,500,000 | 270,000 | Forest Oaks | |
| 1993 | (United States) Rocco Mediate | 281 | −7 | Playoff | (Australia) Steve Elkington | 1,500,000 | 270,000 | Forest Oaks | |
| 1992 | (United States) Davis Love III | 272 | −16 | 6 strokes | (United States) John Cook | 1,250,000 | 225,000 | Forest Oaks | |
| 1991 | (United States) Mark Brooks | 275 | −13 | Playoff | (United States) Gene Sauers | 1,250,000 | 225,000 | Forest Oaks | |
| 1990 | (Australia) Steve Elkington | 282 | −6 | 2 strokes | (United States) Mike Reid (United States) Jeff Sluman | 1,250,000 | 225,000 | Forest Oaks | |
| 1989 | (United States) Ken Green | 277 | −11 | 2 strokes | (United States) John Huston | 1,000,000 | 180,000 | Forest Oaks | |
| 1988 | (Scotland) Sandy Lyle (2) | 271 | −17 | Playoff | (United States) Ken Green | 1,000,000 | 180,000 | Forest Oaks | |
Greater Greensboro Open
| 1987 | (United States) Scott Simpson | 282 | −6 | 2 strokes | (United States) Clarence Rose | 600,000 | 108,000 | Forest Oaks | |
| 1986 | (Scotland) Sandy Lyle | 275 | −13 | 2 strokes | (United States) Andy Bean | 500,000 | 90,000 | Forest Oaks | |
| 1985 | (United States) Joey Sindelar | 285 | −3 | 1 stroke | (Japan) Isao Aoki (United States) Craig Stadler | 400,000 | 72,000 | Forest Oaks | |
| 1984 | (United States) Andy Bean | 280 | −8 | 2 strokes | (United States) George Archer | 400,000 | 72,000 | Forest Oaks | |
| 1983 | (United States) Lanny Wadkins | 275 | −13 | 5 strokes | (United States) Craig Stadler (Zimbabwe) Denis Watson | 400,000 | 72,000 | Forest Oaks | |
| 1982 | (United States) Danny Edwards (2) | 285 | −3 | 1 stroke | (United States) Bobby Clampett | 300,000 | 54,000 | Forest Oaks | |
| 1981 | (United States) Larry Nelson | 281 | −7 | Playoff | (United States) Mark Hayes | 300,000 | 54,000 | Forest Oaks | |
| 1980 | (United States) Craig Stadler | 275 | −13 | 6 strokes | (United States) George Burns (United States) Billy Kratzert (Australia) Jack Newton (United States) Jerry Pate | 250,000 | 45,000 | Forest Oaks | |
| 1979 | (United States) Raymond Floyd | 282 | −6 | 1 stroke | (United States) George Burns (South Africa) Gary Player | 250,000 | 45,000 | Forest Oaks | |
| 1978 | (Spain) Seve Ballesteros | 282 | −6 | 1 stroke | (United States) Jack Renner (United States) Fuzzy Zoeller | 240,000 | 48,000 | Forest Oaks | |
| 1977 | (United States) Danny Edwards | 276 | −12 | 4 strokes | (United States) George Burns (United States) Larry Nelson | 235,000 | 47,000 | Forest Oaks | |
| 1976 | (United States) Al Geiberger | 268 | −16 | 2 strokes | (United States) Lee Trevino | 230,000 | 46,000 | Sedgefield | |
| 1975 | (United States) Tom Weiskopf | 275 | −9 | 3 strokes | (United States) Al Geiberger | 225,000 | 45,000 | Sedgefield | |
| 1974 | (New Zealand) Bob Charles | 270 | −14 | 1 stroke | (United States) Raymond Floyd (United States) Lee Trevino | 220,000 | 44,066 | Sedgefield | |
| 1973 | (United States) Chi-Chi Rodríguez | 267 | −17 | 1 stroke | (United States) Lou Graham (United States) Ken Still | 210,000 | 42,000 | Sedgefield | |
| 1972 | (United States) George Archer (2) | 272 | −12 | Playoff | (United States) Tommy Aaron | 200,000 | 40,000 | Sedgefield | |
| 1971 | (United States) Buddy Allin | 275 | −9 | Playoff | (United States) Dave Eichelberger (United States) Rod Funseth | 190,000 | 38,000 | Sedgefield | |
| 1970 | (South Africa) Gary Player | 271 | −13 | 2 strokes | (United States) Miller Barber | 180,000 | 36,000 | Sedgefield | |
| 1969 | (United States) Gene Littler | 274 | −10 | Playoff | (United States) Julius Boros (United States) Orville Moody (United States) Tom Weiskopf | 160,000 | 32,000 | Sedgefield | |
| 1968 | (United States) Billy Casper (2) | 267 | −17 | 4 strokes | (United States) George Archer (United States) Gene Littler (United States) Bobby Nichols | 137,500 | 27,500 | Sedgefield | |
| 1967 | (United States) George Archer | 267 | −17 | 2 strokes | (United States) Doug Sanders | 125,000 | 25,000 | Sedgefield | |
| 1966 | (United States) Doug Sanders (2) | 276 | −8 | Playoff | (United States) Tom Weiskopf | 100,000 | 20,000 | Sedgefield | |
| 1965 | (United States) Sam Snead (8) | 273 | −11 | 5 strokes | (United States) Billy Casper (United States) Jack McGowan (United States) Phil Rodgers | 70,000 | 11,000 | Sedgefield | |
| 1964 | (United States) Julius Boros | 277 | −7 | Playoff | (United States) Doug Sanders | 45,000 | 6,600 | Sedgefield | |
| 1963 | (United States) Doug Sanders | 270 | −14 | 4 strokes | (United States) Jimmy Clark | 35,000 | 5,500 | Sedgefield | |
| 1962 | (United States) Billy Casper | 275 | −9 | 1 stroke | (United States) Mike Souchak | 35,000 | 5,300 | Sedgefield | |
| 1961 | (United States) Mike Souchak | 276 | −8 | 7 strokes | (United States) Sam Snead | 22,500 | 3,200 | Sedgefield | |
| 1960 | (United States) Sam Snead (7) | 270 | −14 | 2 strokes | (United States) Dow Finsterwald | 20,000 | 2,800 | Starmount Forest | |
| 1959 | (United States) Dow Finsterwald | 278 | −6 | 2 strokes | (United States) Art Wall Jr. | 15,000 | 2,000 | Starmount Forest | |
| 1958 | (United States) Bob Goalby | 275 | −9 | 2 strokes | (United States) Dow Finsterwald (United States) Don January (United States) Tony Lema (United States) Sam Snead (United States) Art Wall Jr. | 15,000 | 2,000 | Starmount Forest | |
| 1957 | (Canada) Stan Leonard | 276 | −4 | 3 strokes | (United States) Mike Souchak | 15,000 | 2,000 | Sedgefield | |
| 1956 | (United States) Sam Snead (6) | 279 | −5 | Playoff | (United States) Fred Wampler | 12,500 | 2,200 | Starmount Forest | |
| 1955 | (United States) Sam Snead (5) | 273 | −7 | 1 stroke | (United States) Julius Boros (United States) Art Wall Jr. | 12,500 | 2,200 | Starmount Forest | |
| 1954 | (United States) Doug Ford | 283 | −1 | Playoff | (United States) Marty Furgol | 10,000 | 2,000 | Starmount Forest | |
| 1953 | (United States) Earl Stewart | 275 | −5 | Playoff | (United States) Sam Snead | 10,000 | 2,000 | Sedgefield | |
| 1952 | (United States) Dave Douglas | 277 | −7 | 1 stroke | (South Africa) Bobby Locke | 10,000 | 2,000 | Starmount Forest | |
| 1951 | (United States) Art Doering | 279 | −5 | 5 strokes | (Australia) Jim Ferrier | 10,000 | 2,000 | Starmount Forest | |
| 1950 | (United States) Sam Snead (4) | 269 | −11 | 10 strokes | (United States) Jimmy Demaret | 10,000 | 2,000 | Sedgefield | |
| 1949 | (United States) Sam Snead (3) | 276 | −8 | Playoff | (United States) Lloyd Mangrum | 10,000 | 2,000 | Starmount Forest | |
| 1948 | (United States) Lloyd Mangrum | 278 | −2 | 1 stroke | (United States) Lew Worsham | 10,000 | 2,000 | Sedgefield | |
| 1947 | (United States) Vic Ghezzi | 286 | +2 | 2 strokes | (United States) Frank Stranahan | 10,000 | 2,000 | Starmount Forest | |
| 1946 | (United States) Sam Snead (2) | 270 | −10 | 6 strokes | (United States) Herman Keiser | 7,500 | 1,500 | Sedgefield | |
| 1945 | (United States) Byron Nelson (2) | 271 | −13 | 8 strokes | (United States) Sammy Byrd | 7,500 | 1,333 | Starmount Forest | |
1943–44: No tournament due to World War II
| 1942 | (United States) Sammy Byrd | 279 | −5 | 2 strokes | (United States) Ben Hogan (United States) Lloyd Mangrum | 5,500 | 1,000 | Starmount Forest | |
| 1941 | (United States) Byron Nelson | 276 | −6 | 2 strokes | (United States) Vic Ghezzi | 5,000 | 1,200 | Sedgefield; Starmount Forest | |
| 1940 | (United States) Ben Hogan | 270 | −12 | 9 strokes | (United States) Craig Wood | 5,000 | 1,200 | Sedgefield; Starmount Forest | |
| 1939 | (United States) Ralph Guldahl | 280 | −2 | 3 strokes | (United States) Clayton Heafner (United States) Lawson Little | 5,000 | 1,200 | Sedgefield; Starmount Forest | |
| 1938 | (United States) Sam Snead | 271 | −11 | 5 strokes | (United States) Johnny Revolta | 5,000 | 1,200 | Sedgefield; Starmount Forest | |

Note: Green highlight indicates scoring records.
