= Doug Sanders =

American professional golfer (1933–2020)

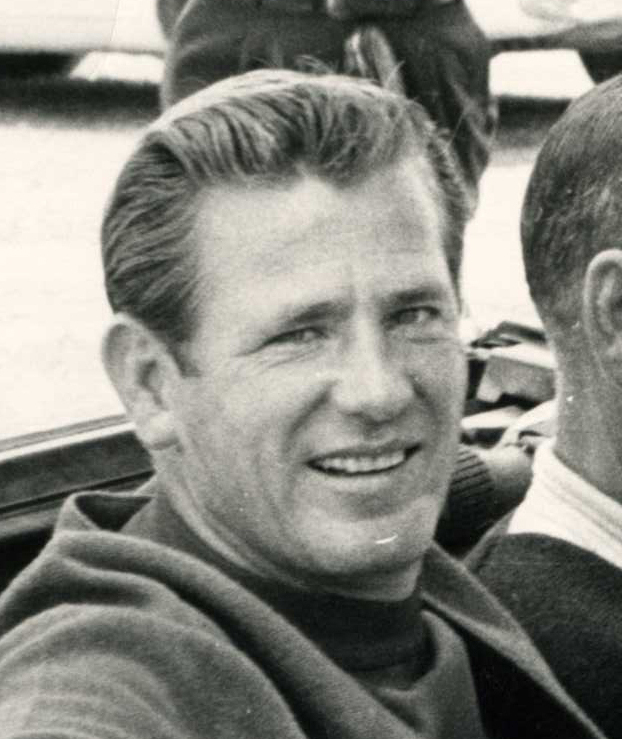
- Sanders, circa 1960s

Personal information
- Full name: George Douglas Sanders
- Nickname: Peacock of the Fairways
- Nationality: United States
- Born: July 24, 1933 Cedartown, Georgia, U.S.
- Died: April 12, 2020 (aged 86) Houston, Texas, U.S.

Career
- Sport: Golf
- College: University of Florida
- Turned professional: 1956
- Former tours: PGA Tour; Champions Tour
- Professional wins: 24

Number of wins by tour
- PGA Tour: 20
- PGA Tour Champions: 1
- Other: 3

Best results in major championships
- Masters Tournament: T4: 1966
- PGA Championship: T2: 1959
- U.S. Open: T2: 1961
- The Open Championship: T2/2nd: 1966, 1970
- U.S. Amateur: R64: 1956
- British Amateur: R256: 1956

George Douglas Sanders (July 24, 1933 – April 12, 2020) was an American professional golfer who won 20 events on the PGA Tour and had four runner-up finishes at major championships.

== Early life ==
He was born into a poor family in Cedartown, Georgia, northwest of Atlanta, where his father farmed and drove trucks. Sanders was the fourth of five children and picked cotton as a teenager. The family home was near a nine-hole course and he was a self-taught golfer.

== Amateur career ==
Sanders accepted an athletic scholarship to the University of Florida in Gainesville, where he played for the Gators golf team in National Collegiate Athletic Association (NCAA) competition in 1955. In his single year as a Gator golfer, Sanders and the team won a Southeastern Conference (SEC) championship and earned a sixth-place finish at the NCAA championship tournament—the Gators' best national championship finish at that time. Sanders won the 1956 Canadian Open as an amateur—the only amateur ever to do so—and turned professional shortly thereafter. Sanders was the last amateur to win on the PGA Tour until Scott Verplank in 1985.

== Professional career ==
Sanders had thirteen top-ten finishes in major championships, including four second-place finishes: 1959 PGA Championship, 1961 U.S. Open, 1966 and 1970 Opens. In 1966, he became one of the few players in history to finish in the top ten of all four major championships in a single season, despite winning none of them. He took four shots from just 74 yards as the leader playing the final hole of the 1970 Open Championship at St Andrews, missing a sidehill 3-foot (0.9 m) putt to win, then lost the resulting 18-hole playoff by a single stroke the next day to Jack Nicklaus. His final victory on tour came in June 1972 at the Kemper Open, one stroke ahead of runner-up Lee Trevino.

Sanders is remembered for an exceptionally short, flat golf swing — a consequence, it appears, of a painful neck condition that radically restricted his movements.

He was a member of the U.S. Ryder Cup team in 1967, which won in Houston.

After retiring from competitive golf, Sanders was active in his own corporate golf entertainment company for nearly 20 years, and sponsored the Doug Sanders International Junior Golf Championship in Houston, Texas. From 1988 to 1994, he also sponsored the Doug Sanders Celebrity Classic.

== Personal life ==
Sanders was a stylish, flamboyant dresser on the golf course, which earned him the nickname "Peacock of the Fairways." Esquire magazine named Sanders one of America's Ten Best Dressed Jocks in August 1972.

Sanders identified himself as the lead character, a playboy PGA Tour golfer, in the golf novel Dead Solid Perfect, by Dan Jenkins.

Sanders wrote a golf instruction book, "Compact Golf", published in 1964, the title of which linked to Sanders' short golf swing. His autobiography "Come swing with me" was published in 1974.

In his autobiography, Sanders said he was invited and intended to accompany fellow pro golfer and 1964 Open winner Tony Lema on the flight in a private plane in 1966 that crashed with no survivors. Sanders changed his schedule at the last minute and did not join Lema on the flight.

== Death ==
Sanders died in his adopted hometown of Houston, Texas, on April 12, 2020, from natural causes. He was 86.

== Awards and honors ==
- In 1972, Sanders was a inducted into the Florida Sports Hall of Fame
- In 1975, Georgia Sports Hall of Fame
- In 2011, Sanders was inducted into the Georgia Golf Hall of Fame
- In 2013, he was inducted into the University of Florida Athletic Hall of Fame as a "Gator Great"

== Amateur wins ==
- 1955 Mexican Amateur

== Professional wins (24) ==
=== PGA Tour wins (20) ===
No.	Date	Tournament	Winning score	To par	Margin of victory	Runner(s)-up
1	Jul 8, 1956	Canadian Open (as an amateur)	69-67-69-68=273	−15	Playoff	(United States) Dow Finsterwald
2	Jun 1, 1958	Western Open	69-68-70-68=275	−13	1 stroke	(United States) Dow Finsterwald
3	Dec 6, 1959	Coral Gables Open Invitational	68-71-69-65=273	−11	3 strokes	(United States) Dow Finsterwald
4	Mar 5, 1961	Greater New Orleans Open Invitational	68-65-69-70=272	−16	5 strokes	(United States) Gay Brewer, (United States) Mac Main
5	May 14, 1961	Colonial National Invitation	69-75-67-70=281	+1	1 stroke	(Australia) Kel Nagle
6	May 21, 1961	Hot Springs Open Invitational	68-68-69-68=273	−15	1 stroke	(United States) Dave Ragan, (United States) Jerry Steelsmith
7	Aug 6, 1961	Eastern Open Invitational	72-66-68-69=275	−13	1 stroke	(United States) Ken Venturi
8	Nov 19, 1961	Cajun Classic Open Invitational	67-67-67-69=270	−14	6 strokes	(United States) Ken Still
9	Mar 11, 1962	Pensacola Open Invitational	67-67-67-69=270	−18	1 stroke	(United States) Don Fairfield
10	Aug 19, 1962	St. Paul Open Invitational	66-69-69-65=269	−19	3 strokes	(United States) Dave Hill
11	Aug 26, 1962	Oklahoma City Open Invitational	70-69-74-67=280	−8	2 strokes	(United States) Johnny Pott
12	Apr 14, 1963	Greater Greensboro Open	68-65-68-69=270	−14	4 strokes	(United States) Jimmy Clark
13	Mar 7, 1965	Pensacola Open Invitational (2)	68-71-65-73=277	−11	Playoff	(United States) Jack Nicklaus
14	Mar 14, 1965	Doral Open Invitational	65-71-71-67=274	−14	1 stroke	(Australia) Bruce Devlin
15	Feb 6, 1966	Bob Hope Desert Classic	70-72-68-73-66=349	−11	Playoff	(United States) Arnold Palmer
16	Mar 27, 1966	Jacksonville Open Invitational	71-65-66-71=273	−15	1 stroke	(United States) Gay Brewer
17	Apr 3, 1966	Greater Greensboro Open (2)	65-70-71-70=276	−8	Playoff	(United States) Tom Weiskopf
18	Mar 5, 1967	Doral Open Invitational (2)	68-71-66-70=275	−9	1 stroke	(South Africa) Harold Henning, (United States) Art Wall Jr.
19	Dec 13, 1970	Bahama Islands Open	66-70-68-68=272	−16	Playoff	(United States) Chris Blocker
20	Jun 4, 1972	Kemper Open	71-68-68-68=275	−13	1 stroke	(United States) Lee Trevino

PGA Tour playoff record (5–5)

No.	Year	Tournament	Opponent	Result
1	1956	Canadian Open (as an amateur)	(United States) Dow Finsterwald	Won with par on first extra hole
2	1961	Phoenix Open Invitational	(United States) Arnold Palmer	Lost 18-hole playoff; Palmer: −3 (67), Sanders: E (70)
3	1962	West Palm Beach Open Invitational	(United States) Dave Ragan	Lost to birdie on second extra hole
4	1964	Greater Greensboro Open	(United States) Julius Boros	Lost to par on first extra hole
5	1965	Pensacola Open Invitational	(United States) Jack Nicklaus	Won with birdie on third extra hole
6	1965	Greater Seattle Open Invitational	(United States) Gay Brewer	Lost to par on first extra hole
7	1966	Bob Hope Desert Classic	(United States) Arnold Palmer	Won with birdie on first extra hole
8	1966	Greater Greensboro Open	(United States) Tom Weiskopf	Won with par on second extra hole
9	1970	The Open Championship	(United States) Jack Nicklaus	Lost 18-hole playoff; Nicklaus: E (72), Sanders: +1 (73)
10	1970	Bahama Islands Open	(United States) Chris Blocker	Won with par on second extra hole

=== Far East Circuit wins (1) ===
No.	Date	Tournament	Winning score	To par	Margin of victory	Runner-up
1	Mar 25, 1963	Yomiuri International	68-77-71-73=289	+1	5 strokes	(Japan) Hideyo Sugimoto

Far East Circuit playoff record (0–1)

No.	Year	Tournament	Opponent	Result
1	1964	Philippine Open	(Australia) Peter Thomson	Lost to bogey on first extra hole

=== Other wins (2) ===
- 1957 Colombian Open
- 1959 Sahara Pro-Am

=== Senior PGA Tour wins (1) ===
No.	Date	Tournament	Winning score	To par	Margin of victory	Runner-up
1	Sep 25, 1983	World Seniors Invitational	70-70-73-70=283	−5	1 stroke	(United States) Miller Barber

== Results in major championships ==
Amateur

Tournament	1955	1956
U.S. Amateur	R128	R64
The Amateur Championship		R256

Professional

Tournament	1957	1958	1959
Masters Tournament	T31		
U.S. Open		CUT	
The Open Championship			
PGA Championship			T2

Tournament	1960	1961	1962	1963	1964	1965	1966	1967	1968	1969
Masters Tournament	T29	T11	T33	T28		T11	T4	T16	T12	T36
U.S. Open	T46	T2	T11	T21	T32	T11	T8	T34	T37	
The Open Championship				CUT	11	CUT	T2	T18	34	
PGA Championship	T3	3	T15	T17	T28	T20	T6	T28	T8	CUT

Tournament	1970	1971	1972	1973	1974	1975	1976
Masters Tournament				CUT			
U.S. Open		T37	CUT			T45	
The Open Championship	2	T9	4	T28			T28
PGA Championship	T41	CUT	T7				

Top 10
Did not play

CUT = missed the half-way cut
R256, R128, R64 = Round in which player lost in match play
"T" indicates a tie for a place

Sources: Masters Tournament, U.S. Open and U.S. Amateur, Open Championship, PGA Championship, 1956 British Amateur

=== Summary ===
Tournament	Wins	2nd	3rd	Top-5	Top-10	Top-25	Events	Cuts made
Masters Tournament	0	0	0	1	1	5	11	10
U.S. Open	0	1	0	1	2	5	13	11
The Open Championship	0	2	0	3	4	6	11	9
PGA Championship	0	1	2	3	6	9	14	12
Totals	0	4	2	8	13	25	49	42

- Most consecutive cuts made – 14 (1965 PGA – 1969 Masters)
- Longest streak of top-10s – 4 (1966 Masters – 1966 PGA)

== See also ==
- List of American Ryder Cup golfers
- List of Florida Gators men's golfers on the PGA Tour
- List of golfers with most PGA Tour wins
- List of University of Florida Athletic Hall of Fame members
