= 1964 Masters Tournament =

- Front cover of the 1964 Masters Guide

Tournament information
- Dates: April 9–12, 1964
- Location: Augusta, Georgia; 33.503°N 82.020°W
- Course: Augusta National Golf Club
- Organized by: Augusta National Golf Club
- Tour: PGA Tour

Statistics
- Par: 72
- Length: 6,980 yards (6,383 m)
- Field: 96 players, 48 after cut
- Cut: 148 (+4)
- Prize fund: $129,800
- Winner's share: $20,000

Champion
- (United States) Arnold Palmer
- 276 (−12)

Location map
- Location in the United States Location in Georgia

The 1964 Masters Tournament was the 28th Masters Tournament, held April 9–12 at Augusta National Golf Club in Augusta, Georgia. A field of 96 players entered the tournament and 48 made the 36-hole cut at 148 (+4).

Arnold Palmer, age 34, opened with three rounds in the 60s and led by five strokes after 54 holes at 206 (−10). He carded a final round of 70 on Sunday to win by six strokes to become the first four-time winner of the Masters. It was his seventh and final major victory.

Craig Wood, the 1941 champion, played in his final Masters, but withdrew before completing the first round. Prior to his win at Augusta, he was the runner-up in the first two Masters in 1934 and 1935.

Labron Harris Jr. won the Par 3 contest with a score of 23.

Palmer was later joined as a four-time winner at Augusta by Jack Nicklaus in 1972 and Tiger Woods in 2005; Nicklaus won his fifth in 1975 and a record sixth in 1986, Woods won his fifth in 2019.

== Field ==
1. Masters champions

Jack Burke Jr. (4), Jimmy Demaret, Doug Ford (4,8), Ralph Guldahl, Claude Harmon, Ben Hogan, Herman Keiser, Cary Middlecoff (2), Byron Nelson, Jack Nicklaus (2,4,8,10), Arnold Palmer (2,3,8,9,11), Gary Player (3,4,8,9,10), Gene Sarazen, Sam Snead (8), Art Wall Jr. (8,10), Craig Wood

- Henry Picard did not play.

The following categories only apply to Americans

2. U.S. Open champions (last 10 years)

Tommy Bolt, Julius Boros (8,9,11), Billy Casper (8,11), Jack Fleck, Ed Furgol (8), Gene Littler (8,11)

- Dick Mayer (8) did not play

3. The Open champions (last 10 years)

4. PGA champions (last 10 years)

Jerry Barber, Dow Finsterwald (8,9,10,11), Chick Harbert, Jay Hebert, Lionel Hebert (9), Bob Rosburg

5. U.S. Amateur and Amateur champions (last 10 years)

Deane Beman (6,7,a), Charles Coe (6,7,a), Richard Davies (6,a), Labron Harris Jr. (6,a)

- Harvie Ward did not play. Other champions forfeited their exemptions by turning professional.

6. Members of the 1963 U.S. Walker Cup team

Robert W. Gardner (a), Downing Gray (a), Billy Joe Patton (a), R. H. Sikes (7,a), Charlie Smith (a), Ed Updegraff (a)

7. 1963 U.S. Amateur quarter-finalists

Richard Guardiola (a), Johnny Owens (a), Steve Spray (a), Walter Stahl (a)

- George Archer forfeited his exemption by turning professional.

8. Top 24 players and ties from the 1963 Masters Tournament

Wes Ellis, Don January (9), Tony Lema (9,11), Billy Maxwell (9,10,11), Bobby Nichols (9), Johnny Pott (11), Mason Rudolph, Dan Sikes (9), Mike Souchak, Bo Wininger

9. Top 16 players and ties from the 1963 U.S. Open

Walter Burkemo, Jacky Cupit, Mike Fetchick, Paul Harney, Davis Love Jr., Dave Ragan (10,11), Dean Refram

10. Top eight players and ties from 1963 PGA Championship

Gardner Dickinson, Jim Ferrier, Al Geiberger, Tommy Jacobs, Bill Johnston

11. Members of the U.S. 1963 Ryder Cup team

Bob Goalby

12. Two players selected for meritorious records on the fall part of the 1963 PGA Tour

Rex Baxter, Jack Rule Jr.

13. One player, either amateur or professional, not already qualified, selected by a ballot of ex-Masters champions

Dave Marr

14. One professional, not already qualified, selected by a ballot of ex-U.S. Open champions

Phil Rodgers

15. One amateur, not already qualified, selected by a ballot of ex-U.S. Amateur champions

- Bill Hyndman was selected but later withdrew with a shoulder injury

16. Two players, not already qualified, from a points list based on finishes in the winter part of the 1964 PGA Tour

Gay Brewer, Don Fairfield

17. Foreign invitations

Alfonso Angelini, Al Balding, Peter Butler, Antonio Cerdá, Bob Charles (3,8), Chen Ching-Po (8), Gary Cowan (a), Bruce Crampton (8,9,10), Gerard de Wit, Bruce Devlin, Juan Antonio Estrada (a), Jean Garaïalde, Harold Henning, Geoffrey Hunt, Tomoo Ishii, Stan Leonard (8), Sebastián Miguel, Kel Nagle (3), Enrique Orellana, Chi-Chi Rodríguez, Miguel Sala, Ramón Sota, Dave Thomas, Retief Waltman, Nick Weslock (a)

- Numbers in brackets indicate categories that the player would have qualified under had they been American.

== Round summaries ==
=== First round ===
Thursday, April 9, 1964

Place	Player	Score	To par
T1	(United States) Bob Goalby	69	−3
T1	(United States) Davis Love Jr.	69	−3
T1	(Australia) Kel Nagle	69	−3
T1	(United States) Arnold Palmer	69	−3
T1	(South Africa) Gary Player	69	−3
T6	(United States) Don January	70	−2
T6	(United States) Gene Littler	70	−2
T6	(United States) Dave Marr	70	−2
T6	(United States) Billy Joe Patton (a)	70	−2
T10	(New Zealand) Bob Charles	71	−1
T10	(Canada) Gary Cowan (a)	71	−1
T10	(United States) Jim Ferrier	71	−1
T10	(United States) Dow Finsterwald	71	−1
T10	(United States) Jack Nicklaus	71	−1
T10	(Puerto Rico) Chi-Chi Rodríguez	71	−1

=== Second round ===
Friday, April 10, 1964

Place	Player	Score	To par
1	(United States) Arnold Palmer	69-68=137	−7
2	(South Africa) Gary Player	69-72=141	−3
T3	(United States) Don January	70-72=142	−2
T3	(United States) Gene Littler	70-72=142	−2
T5	(New Zealand) Bob Charles	71-72=143	−1
T5	(United States) Dow Finsterwald	71-72=143	−1
T5	(United States) Tony Lema	75-68=143	−1
T5	(United States) Dave Marr	70-73=143	−1
T9	(England) Peter Butler	72-72=144	E
T9	(United States) Jimmy Demaret	75-69=144	E
T9	(Australia) Bruce Devlin	72-72=144	E
T9	(United States) Jim Ferrier	71-73=144	E
T9	(United States) Bob Goalby	69-75=144	E
T9	(United States) Davis Love Jr.	69-75=144	E
T9	(United States) Jack Nicklaus	71-73=144	E
T9	(United States) Billy Joe Patton (a)	70-74=144	E
T9	(United States) Johnny Pott	74-70=144	E
T9	(Puerto Rico) Chi-Chi Rodríguez	71-73=144	E
T9	(United States) Dan Sikes	76-68=144	E

=== Third round ===
Saturday, April 11, 1964

Place	Player	Score	To par
1	(United States) Arnold Palmer	69-68-69=206	−10
2	(Australia) Bruce Devlin	72-72-67=211	−5
3	(United States) Dave Marr	70-73-69=212	−4
T4	(England) Peter Butler	72-72-69=213	−3
T4	(United States) Jim Ferrier	71-73-69=213	−3
T4	(South Africa) Gary Player	69-72-72=213	−3
7	(United States) Bo Wininger	74-71-69=214	−2
T8	(United States) Deane Beman (a)	74-71-70=215	−1
T8	(United States) Ben Hogan	73-75-67=215	−1
T8	(United States) Billy Maxwell	73-73-69=215	−1
T8	(United States) Jack Nicklaus	71-73-71=215	−1
T8	(United States) Johnny Pott	74-70-71=215	−1
T8	(United States) Dan Sikes	76-68-71=215	−1

=== Final round ===
Sunday, April 12, 1964

==== Final leaderboard ====
Champion
Silver Cup winner (low amateur)
(a) = amateur
(c) = past champion

Top 10
Place	Player	Score	To par	Money ($)
1	(United States) Arnold Palmer (c)	69-68-69-70=276	−12	20,000
T2	(United States) Dave Marr	70-73-69-70=282	−6	10,100
T2	(United States) Jack Nicklaus (c)	71-73-71-67=282	−6	10,100
4	(Australia) Bruce Devlin	72-72-67-73=284	−4	6,100
T5	(United States) Billy Casper	76-72-69-69=286	−2	3,700
T5	(United States) Jim Ferrier	71-73-69-73=286	−2	3,700
T5	(United States) Paul Harney	73-72-71-70=286	−2	3,700
T5	(South Africa) Gary Player (c)	69-72-72-73=286	−2	3,700
T9	(United States) Dow Finsterwald	71-72-75-69=287	−1	1,700
T9	(United States) Ben Hogan (c)	73-75-67-72=287	−1	1,700
T9	(United States) Tony Lema	75-68-74-70=287	−1	1,700
T9	(United States) Mike Souchak	73-74-70-70=287	−1	1,700

Leaderboard below the top 10
Place	Player	Score	To par	Money ($)
T13	(England) Peter Butler	72-72-69-75=288	E	1,340
T13	(United States) Al Geiberger	75-73-70-70=288	E	1,340
T13	(United States) Gene Littler	70-72-78-68=288	E	1,340
T13	(United States) Johnny Pott	74-70-71-73=288	E	1,340
T13	(United States) Dan Sikes	76-68-71-73=288	E	1,340
T18	(United States) Don January	70-72-75-72=289	+1	1,100
T18	(United States) Billy Maxwell	73-73-69-74=289	+1	1,100
T18	(United States) Mason Rudolph	75-72-69-73=289	+1	1,100
T21	(Australia) Bruce Crampton	74-72-73-71=290	+2	1,100
T21	(Australia) Kel Nagle	69-77-71-73=290	+2	1,100
T21	(Puerto Rico) Chi-Chi Rodríguez	71-73-73-73=290	+2	1,100
T21	(United States) Bo Wininger	74-71-69-76=290	+2	1,100
T25	(United States) Deane Beman (a)	74-71-70-76=291	+3	0
T25	(United States) Gay Brewer	75-72-73-71=291	+3	875
T25	(Canada) Gary Cowan (a)	71-77-72-71=291	+3	0
T25	(United States) Bobby Nichols	75-71-75-70=291	+3	875
T25	(United States) Phil Rodgers	75-72-72-72=291	+3	875
T30	(United States) Jay Hebert	74-74-69-75=292	+4	875
T30	(United States) Dean Refram	74-72-73-73=292	+4	875
T32	(United States) Jimmy Demaret (c)	75-69-73-76=293	+5	850
T32	(United States) Lionel Hebert	74-74-73-72=293	+5	850
T34	(United States) Wes Ellis	73-71-75-75=294	+6	850
T34	(United States) Davis Love Jr.	69-75-74-76=294	+6	850
T34	(Spain) Ramón Sota	76-72-74-72=294	+6	850
T37	(United States) Don Fairfield	75-73-76-71=295	+7	850
T37	(United States) Bob Goalby	69-75-74-77=295	+7	850
T37	(United States) Billy Joe Patton (a)	70-74-77-74=295	+7	0
T40	(New Zealand) Bob Charles	71-72-75-78=296	+8	825
T40	(United States) Jacky Cupit	73-73-76-74=296	+8	825
T40	(Japan) Tomoo Ishii	77-71-75-73=296	+8	825
43	(United States) Labron Harris Jr. (a)	74-74-77-72=297	+9	0
T44	(Chinese Taipei) Chen Ching-Po	74-72-74-78=298	+10	825
T44	(United States) Dave Ragan	73-72-78-75=298	+10	825
T46	(United States) Doug Ford (c)	78-70-76-75=299	+11	825
T46	(United States) R. H. Sikes (a)	75-73-78-73=299	+11	0
48	(United States) Jerry Barber	74-73-77-80=304	+16	825
CUT	(United States) Steve Spray (a)	74-75=149	+5	
CUT	(United States) Ed Updegraff (a)	73-76=149	+5	
CUT	(Canada) Al Balding	75-75=150	+6	
CUT	(United States) Tommy Bolt	73-77=150	+6	
CUT	(United States) Chick Harbert	76-74=150	+6	
CUT	(England) Geoffrey Hunt	77-73=150	+6	
CUT	(United States) Art Wall Jr. (c)	73-77=150	+6	
CUT	(South Africa) Retief Waltman	72-78=150	+6	
CUT	(United States) Rex Baxter	77-74=151	+7	
CUT	(United States) Walter Burkemo	75-76=151	+7	
CUT	(United States) Robert W. Gardner (a)	74-77=151	+7	
CUT	(United States) Tommy Jacobs	76-75=151	+7	
CUT	(Spain) Sebastián Miguel	74-77=151	+7	
CUT	(United States) Byron Nelson (c)	75-76=151	+7	
CUT	(Canada) Nick Weslock (a)	73-78=151	+7	
CUT	(United States) Charles Coe (a)	80-72=152	+8	
CUT	(United States) Richard Davies (a)	78-74=152	+8	
CUT	(South Africa) Harold Henning	75-77=152	+8	
CUT	(United States) Jack Rule Jr.	81-71=152	+8	
CUT	(United States) Charlie Smith (a)	74-78=152	+8	
CUT	(United States) Sam Snead (c)	79-73=152	+8	
CUT	(Wales) Dave Thomas	74-78=152	+8	
CUT	(United States) Julius Boros	75-78=153	+9	
CUT	(United States) Jack Burke Jr. (c)	76-77=153	+9	
CUT	(United States) Jack Fleck	76-77=153	+9	
CUT	(United States) Ed Furgol	73-80=153	+9	
CUT	(France) Jean Garaïalde	75-78=153	+9	
CUT	(Canada) Stan Leonard	77-76=153	+9	
CUT	(United States) Bob Rosburg	78-75=153	+9	
CUT	(Netherlands) Gerard de Wit	78-76=154	+10	
CUT	(Mexico) Juan Antonio Estrada (a)	81-73=154	+10	
CUT	(United States) Claude Harmon (c)	77-77=154	+10	
CUT	(United States) Bill Johnston	77-77=154	+10	
CUT	(Italy) Alfonso Angelini	72-83=155	+11	
CUT	(United States) Herman Keiser (c)	79-76=155	+11	
CUT	(Colombia) Miguel Sala	78-77=155	+11	
CUT	(United States) Cary Middlecoff (c)	79-77=156	+12	
CUT	(United States) Gardner Dickinson	80-77=157	+13	
CUT	(United States) Mike Fetchick	76-81=157	+13	
CUT	(Argentina) Antonio Cerdá	77-82=159	+15	
CUT	(United States) Ralph Guldahl (c)	79-80=159	+15	
CUT	(United States) Walter Stahl (a)	80-79=159	+15	
CUT	(Chile) Enrique Orellana	80-80=160	+16	
CUT	(United States) Johnny Owens (a)	81-79=160	+16	
CUT	(United States) Richard Guardiola (a)	80-84=164	+20	
CUT	(United States) Downing Gray (a)	87-79=166	+22	
WD	(United States) Gene Sarazen (c)	73	+1	
WD	(United States) Craig Wood (c)			

==== Scorecard ====
Hole	1	2	3	4	5	6	7	8	9	10	11	12	13	14	15	16	17	18
Par	4	5	4	3	4	3	4	5	4	4	4	3	5	4	5	3	4	4
(United States) Palmer	−10	−10	−10	−11	−10	−10	−11	−11	−11	−10	−10	−10	−10	−11	−12	−12	−11	−12
(United States) Marr	−4	−5	−6	−6	−6	−6	−6	−7	−7	−7	−6	−5	−5	−5	−5	−5	−5	−6
(United States) Nicklaus	−1	−2	−2	−2	−1	−1	−2	−2	−3	−2	−2	−3	−5	−5	−6	−6	−6	−6
(Australia) Devlin	−6	−7	−7	−6	−5	−5	−5	−6	−5	−5	−3	−3	−4	−4	−5	−5	−4	−4

Cumulative tournament scores, relative to par

Eagle	Birdie	Bogey	Double bogey
