= Blessings Golf Club =

Private golf course in Johnson, Arkansas

Coordinates: 36°07′58″N 94°12′05″W

Blessings Golf Club is a private, 18-hole golf course located along Clear Creek in Fayetteville, Arkansas. Blessings is accessible to Club members along with the University of Arkansas men’s and women’s golf teams. Its creation was funded by Tyson Foods Chairman John H. Tyson.

Blessings was designed by Robert Trent Jones Jr. and opened in June 2004.

== Course design and features ==
From the back tees, Blessings Golf Club has a rating of 80.9 and a slope of 155, making a course that its original designer, Robert Trent Jones Jr., called "strict" and "strong." Jones credited Club founder John H. Tyson with having significant input in the course design.

Blessings sits at an elevation of 1,339 feet and is routed in an “out-and-back” fashion featuring three par fives on the outward half and three par threes on the inward half. The course’s standard layout has a par of 72, but three adjustable holes create the option to play to a different par. Blessings measures at just over 7,800 yards in length.

Its topography is characterized by hilly elevation changes, cross-hazards, and bold green contours, with Clear Creek in play on several holes. The course, which uses a continuous 18-hole routing rather than two returning nines, continues through the Clear Creek floodplain and a plateau that rises to 65 feet above the floodplain, where it is bisected by a series of ravines.

Prior to hosting the NCAA Men’s and Women’s Golf Championships in 2019, the course was remodeled by architect Kyle Phillips. In 2025, Golf Digest ranked Blessings Golf Club No. 156 on its list of America’s 200 Greatest Golf Courses.

== Amenities and clubhouse ==
Blessings' clubhouse was designed in a modern style by architect Marlon Blackwell. The clubhouse is outfitted with design features that include local stone.

Club members and members of the Arkansas Razorback golf teams have access to the Fred W. and Mary B. Smith Razorback Golf Center, located on the grounds.

== Notable events ==
The 2019 NCAA Division I Women's and Men's Golf Championships were held at Blessings, with the Duke women and Stanford men winning the team titles. Maria Fassi of Arkansas was the women's individual champion and Matthew Wolff of Oklahoma State won the men's individual title.

Blessings hosted the 2025 Southern Amateur Championship won by John Daly II and since 2020 has been the site of the Blessings Collegiate Invitational, with Tyson Foods serving as lead sponsor. Other events hosted by the club include the 2012 SEC Women’s Championship, the 2013 NCAA Men’s Fayetteville Regional, and the 2025 NCAA Men’s Fayetteville Regional.
