= Jerry Stolhand =

American professional golfer (1935–1989)

Personal information
- Nationality: United States
- Born: April 17, 1935 Ponca City, Oklahoma, U.S.
- Died: February 1, 1989 (aged 53) Breadalbane, New South Wales, Australia
- Spouse: Pam
- Children: 8

Career
- Sport: Golf
- Turned professional: 1955
- Former tour: PGA Tour of Australasia
- Professional wins: 10

Jerry Stolhand (April 17, 1935 – February 1, 1989) was an American golfer. Stolhand turned pro in the mid-1950s and quickly had success, winning the Louisiana State Open. However, he ultimately regained his amateur status and moved to Hawaii. While working as a car salesman, Stolhand played a number of notable amateur events in the state, culminating with a win at the 1968 Hawaii Amateur. Shortly thereafter, he turned pro once again and moved to Australia. Stolhand played on full-time Australian circuit during the late 1960s and early 1970s, recording a number of high finishes but failed to win. For the remainder of his career, he worked as a club professional though had some success as a senior, winning the 1988 Australian PGA Seniors Championship.

== Early life ==
Stolhand was raised in Ponca City, Oklahoma. His father, Charlie, was one of state's top amateurs, winning the 1951 Oklahoma State Amateur. His brother, Charley Jr., also had much success as amateur golfer. In addition, Stolhand's uncle, Harold, was also a champion golfer. Due to the family's success at golf, The Ponca City News referred to the Stolhands as "Ponca City's ruling family of the links."

Stolhand first received media attention in August 1946 at the Ponca City Golf Tournament. In the first round of the "Championship Flight" he lost to Leroy Wilks 10 & 8. Three years later, at the age of 13, he qualified for the Oklahoma State Junior Championship. He made it to the class C finals. There he lost a "tough" finals match to Mervin Buchanan, 1 up. Two months later, in August 1949, Stolhand earned entry into the Oklahoma Invitational Sub-Junior Golf Tournament. He shot a 79 to finish in fourth place, three back. The only players to defeat him were champion Johnny Johnson, runner-up Orville Moody, and his brother Charley. The following year, in June 1950, Stolhand qualified for the Oklahoma State Junior Championship again. In the first round, Stolhand recorded the first hole-in-one in tournament history but still lost his match and was eliminated. Later in the month he qualified for the Oklahoma Amateur.

In the early 1950s, Stolhand won a number of local amateur tournaments. In July 1950, he played a one-round Jaycees tournament at Lakeside. Playing among 66 contestants, Stolhand "breezed" through the tournament, shooting a 74 to win by one. In June 1951, Stolhand played the Oklahoma State Junior Championship once more. He won the tournament for the first time. Later in the summer, Stolhand won the inaugural Lakeside Invitational Golf Tournament. Later in the year Stolhand played in the Ponca City Municipal Golf Tournament. He made it to the finals where he was set to face Bud Creveling. Stolhand defeated Creveling, 3 & 1.

In the spring of 1952, Stolhand started receiving attention for his play on the Ponca City High School's golf team. In late March, he was medalist in a match against Stillwater High School. A few days later, he shot a "sterling" even-par 70 to lead his team to a victory over Enid High School. Partly due to these good performances, he earned the "No. 1 position" for his team.

== Amateur career ==
Late in the 1952 school year, it was announced that Stolhand's family was moving to Lake Charles, Louisiana. His father was transferred there by his corporation, Continental Oil Company. In the summer, Stolhand had much success in amateur events across the United States. In June, he returned to Oklahoma to defend his Oklahoma State Juniors Championship. He "breezed past" two early competitors to reach the semifinals. In semifinals, Stolhand shot under-par, including a "sizzling" 32 on the back nine, to again win easily. He was scheduled to play Fred Lawson in the finals. On June 8, he won the event for the second straight year. Later in the summer, Stolhand won the men's golf championship of his new hometown, Lake Charles. In August 1952, Stolhand attempted to qualify for the Jaycee National Junior Golf Tournament, one of the top amateur golf tournaments in the United States. The event was held at Eugene Country Club in Eugene, Oregon. Stolhand easily qualified at the two round qualifier. He was in the top ten after the second and third rounds and in contention entering the final day. Though he shot a 79 in the final round he still finished in a tie for tenth.

Stolhand intended to enter Oklahoma A&M, located in Stillwater, Oklahoma, in the fall of 1953 for college. The summer prior to college he won a number of amateur events in Oklahoma. In early July, he was committed to play the Lakeside Invitational Golf Tournament, the event he won two years previous. He "assaulted" the Lakeside course, breaking the course record twice, to win the event. Later in the month, he won a Jaycee-sponsored golf meet in Ponca City, Oklahoma. In August, he played the "championship flight" of the Lakeside golf championship. He reached the finals where he was scheduled to play Ozzie Newell. Stolhand defeated Newell to win the tournament. During this era, Stolhand also served in the military.

== Professional career ==
As of the summer of 1955, Stolhand had turned professional. He was living in Sulphur, Louisiana at the time. The first time Stolhand received significant media attention as a pro was in November 1955. That month he played the three-round Louisiana-Mississippi Open Invitational Golf Tournament. Stolhand opened with one-under-par 71s to move into a tie for second, three back of leader Frank Champ. However, he shot a "disastrous" final round 80 to fall out of contention. Despite the poor finish, however, he earned "a lot of admiration" from the pros at the event, including from Champ, who won the event. In July 1956, Stolhand captained a four-man team at a pro-am in Jal, New Mexico. Playing against a number of past and future PGA Tour players like Labron Harris and Jacky Cupit, Stolhand's team won the event. In the fall of 1956, he became the assistant pro at L.W. Clapp Golf Course in Wichita, Kansas. In November, he teamed up with Dean Adkisson, the head pro at Clapp, for the Wichita Pro-Assistant Golf Tournament. Stolhand and Adkisson won three of their four matches in extra holes, including the final, to win the event.

As of 1958, Stolhand had moved back to Louisiana. He worked as a car salesman. Stolhand still played notable events, however. In October, he played the three-round Louisiana State Open. Stolhand opened with rounds of 67 and 69 to put him in solo second, two back of leader Jay Hebert, a recent PGA Tour winner. In the final round, he birdied the first two holes to tie Hebert for the lead. Stolhand scored high in the middle of the round but it remained close as Hebert also struggled. Stolhand then finished birdie-par-birdie "to ease by" Hebert and amateur Shirley Picard by one. In addition, he defeated fourth-place finisher Lionel Hebert, a recent major championship winner, by two strokes and PGA Tour pro Bert Weaver, the fifth-place finisher, by three strokes. At the event, Stolhand also won the Louisiana Professional Golf Organization's championship, played concurrently, by seven strokes over Ivan Sicks.

In the late 1950s and early 1960s, Stolhand moved around the country, from Louisiana to Texas to Washington state. Stolhand occasionally played in notable tournaments across North America during this era but his results were erratic. In March 1959 and the following year, he played the Gulf Coast Invitational Golf Tournament. In both cases Stolhand opened near the lead. However, both years he scored significantly over-par for the remainder of the tournament and finished out of contention. In the middle of 1963, Stolhand once more played the Odessa pro-am, a pairs event, in Odessa, Texas. Stolhand team's opened with a six-under-par 66, one off the lead, but faded from there. In late August 1964, Stolhand played the two-round Trail Open in Trail, British Columbia. Stolhand was at even-par after the first 26 holes and had a good chance to win. However, he then made four consecutive bogies to fall "out of contention." He finished at 146, in a tie for third, three back.

== Re-instated amateur status ==
In 1965, Stolhand moved to Hawaii as a "newcomer from Seattle, Washington." He continued to work as a car salesman. He also regained his amateur status as a golfer. Stolhand first received media attention in Hawaii for his play at the Mid-Pacific Open in March. He closed with a two-under-par 70 to finish at 294, in a tie for fifth, placing second among amateurs. In April, he played the Hawaii Amateur at Waialae Country Club. In the second round, Stolhand shot a 71, the day's only under-par round, to move into a tie for second, two back. After a third round 73 he moved into a tie for the lead. However, with a final round 79, "Stolhand shot [himself] out of contention." He finished in solo third, two back. Despite the poor finish, Stolhand had a number of top performances later in the year. In May, he played the Hawaii Public Links Four-ball Medal Golf Tournament at his home course, Ala Wai. Pairing with John DeMello, the team shot 67 and 70 to finish in third place, four back. Later in the month Stolhand tied for the win at another fourball tournament, this time at International Golf and Country Club with Charles Veregee. In July, he won a charity event benefitting Kaneohe Bay Youth Activities Association. In August, he played the Army Open Invitational Golf Tournament. In the first round, Stolhand shot an even-par 72 to position himself in fourth place and tie John DeMello the amateur lead. In the second round, he again shot even-par to maintain a share of the amateur lead and remain in the top five overall. In the third round Stolhand "took over sole possession of first place" in the amateur division with a 74 (+2) and remained in fifth place overall. In the final round, Stolhand shot a 71 to finish fourth overall though lost amateur honors as Masa Kaya, a local bus driver, shot a 67 to defeat all competitors.

In 1966, Stolhand had the chance to win several tournaments. However, he often fell short down the stretch. In March, Stolhand once more played the Hawaii Amateur, again held at Waialae. In the second round, Stolhand shot a one-under-par 71, the day's second best round, to move into a tie for fourth, three back of leader Masa Kaye. In the third round, however, Stolhand scored a "disastrous" 10 on the 6th hole "to knock himself out of contention." He closed with rounds of 84 and 81 to finish well back. In May, he played the Navy-Marine Golf Tournament. Stolhand opened with a 66 (−6), including two eagles and two birdies, to take the lead. He tied the course record set by Smiley Quick. He stated after the round, "It was the best competitive round I ever had in my life." However, in the second round Stolhand "soared" to a 78 and "dropped well behind the leaders." In August, Stolhand played the Army Open Golf Championship. Stolhand opened with a 73, one-over-par, holding solo second overall and leading the amateurs. In the second round he shot a three-under-par 69 to take the solo lead. Stolhand shot a third round 75 (+3) but on the more challenging, "stretched out" course he actually increased his lead to two strokes. In the final round, however, Stolhand "skied" to a 79 finishing well back of champion Paul Scodeller. Despite the poor finish Stolhand still finished solo second and won the amateur division by a wide margin. In September, he played the Barber's Point Open. Stolhand opened with a 69 (−3) to tie for the lead. In the second round, he continued "to hold his own with the pros," shooting a 71 (−1), to remain tied for the lead. However, Stolhand "soared" with a 79 (+7) in the third round to fall significantly behind. In the final round he again shot over-par but still earned amateur honors. Despite the poor finishes, at the end of the year the Honolulu Star-Bulletin referred to Stolhand as one of "the best amateurs" in the state.

Stolhand continued to receive media attention for his performances in amateur golf tournaments for the remainder of the late 1960s, winning several. In December 1966, Stolhand played the International Goodwill Golf Tournament at his home course, Ala Wai. He represented the Caucasian team. Stolhand tied for lowest individual score and led his team to a second-place finish among seven teams. Several months later, in the middle of 1967, he played the Barber's Point Open. Stolhand opened with a one-under-par 71 to put him in a tie for sixth place. Stolhand failed to break par the next two rounds but closed with a 68 (−4) to finish solo second and win the amateur division easily. Late in the year, he again represented the Caucasians in the International Goodwill Golf Tournament. Stolhand "paced" his team to victory, shooting rounds of 70 and 71, the lowest score for any individual. In early 1968, Stolhand attempted to qualify for the Hawaii State Fourball Golf Tournament. At the qualifier, he and teammate Ron Castillo shot a 66 to win earn medalist honors. The team would go on to win the two-round event. Later in the year, he won the Kaneohe Bay Youth tournament again. In March 1968, Stolhand played the three-round Hawaii Amateur again. Stolhand opened with a three-under-par 69 to put him in solo fifth, three back. Playing against "brisk trade winds," Stolhand's even-par second round was enough to move into the solo lead. In the final round, Stolhand "had a run of birdies" in the middle of the back nine to expand his lead. He played the final six holes four-over-par but still won easily. It was his "first medal championship."

== Second professional career ==
Stolhand turned professional again in April 1968. He got a job as assistant pro at Waialae Country Club. In May, Stolhand played his first professional tournament, the Navy-Marine Open. He finished in solo fifth place. He earned $125. For the remainder of the summer, Stolhand had high results at a number of other tournaments. In June, he played the two-round Hawaiian Professional Golfers Scotch Medal at Kalakaua Golf Course. He partnered with Barrett Melvin. With rounds of 75 and 72, Stolhand's team won by one. In June, he played the Barber's Point Open again, an event where he earned low amateur honors the previous two years. Stolhand opened with a 70 (−2) to take a one shot lead over professional Larry Ordonio and amateur Allan Yamamoto. The remainder of the tournament would be a back and forth affair between Stolhand and Yamamoto. The two traded the lead over the second and third rounds. Early during the final round, however, Stolhand struggled, shooting several over-par. He made "a late charge," including a birdie at the last hole, but it was not enough as Yamamoto, the only player to match par during the windy day, defeated him by two. In July, Stolhand played the Hawaii PGA Match Play Tournament. He was one of the "favorites." However, in the first round he lost to Frank Rutgers. It was "[t]he day's biggest surprise." Stolhand, however, won all of his matches in the consolation bracket to reach the finals. In the consolation finals, he birdied the 17th hole to defeat Bob Helms, 3 &1. In August, he played the Army Open. Stolhand opened with rounds of 72 and 69 to take the lead. However, in the third round "he skied to a 79" to fall one behind Jack Omuro. Omuro struggled during the final day opening doors but Stolhand himself struggled, shooting a 76. Stolhand finished in solo third, four back.

=== Australasian circuits ===
On October 1, 1968, Stolhand traveled to New Zealand to play on the local golf circuit. "I've already been signed up for six tournaments," he told the Honolulu Advertiser. "I hope to play in seven." Stolhand first received media attention for his play on the New Zealand Golf Circuit in early December at the Caltex Tournament. He finished in a tie for 12th place at the event. Later in the season, it was noted that Stolhand made the cut at the Wattie's Tournament and BP Tournament. As of March 1969, Stolhand was playing on the Asia Golf Circuit. In April, Stolhand received media attention for his play at the Taiwan Open. He was in the top five at the midway point and finished in the top ten.

As of May 1969, Stolhand started playing on the Australian circuit. He decided to endeavor on a "two-month winter tour." During this era, Stolhand played a number of 36-hole tournaments. In general, he "play[ed] well in one round only to collapse in the second." One of these tournaments was the two-round $1,650 professional purse at South Lakes. Stolhand opened with a 72 to put him near the lead, outplaying top golfers like Graham Marsh and David Graham. However, he shot a 77 in the final round to finish well back.

By June, he decided to stay in Australia for a full year. Stolhand explained that he was playing full-time in Australia to prepare himself for the PGA Tour Qualifying school and potentially playing on the PGA Tour. Early during this experience, Stolhand had much success at minor tournaments throughout the country. In late June, he was slated to play the two-round Yarrawonga Open. He was considered one of the favorites by Peter Stone of The Age. Stolhand opened with a 68 (−3) to tie Peter Mills for the lead. However, he shot a final round 73 to finish two back of champion Mills, in solo third. Despite the poor finish Stolhand beat a number of notable players, including Walter Godfrey, David Graham, and Vic Bennetts. In September, Stolhand played the New South Wales PGA Championship. He was again considered one of the favorites. Stolhand opened near the lead and eventually finished in a tie for 12th. The following week Stolhand played the West End Tournament. Other than some shaky putting, Stolhand played "immaculate golf" in the first round, shooting a 70, putting him one off the lead. Stolhand was in contention for the remainder of the tournament and ultimately finished in a tie for third.

Late in the year, Stolhand played in some elite events with impressive international fields. However, he was generally unable to keep up with these top golfers. In October, he played the Wills Masters. Stolhand made the cut but closed with rounds of 77 and 81 to finish in second to last place among those who earned rights to play the weekend. The following week at the Australian Open, Stolhand shot a third round 80 and failed to qualify for the final round. At the end of the month, Stolhand played the Dunlop International. However, he was not in the money at the end. In November, Stolhand opened with rounds of 77 at the Australian PGA Championship to quickly fall out of contention.

Soon thereafter, Stolhand started playing some minor tournaments in the Australasian region. He had a little more success in these events. In December 1969, he played the Caltex Tournament in New Zealand. Stolhand closed with under-par rounds to finish T-4. In January, he recorded another top ten in the country, this time at the New Zealand PGA Championship. In the middle of the year, Stolhand started playing tournaments in Australia again. In August 1970, he recorded a top ten at the South Pacific Open at Surfers Paradise. The following month, he won the Tamworth Open.

Stolhand returned to full-time play on the Australian circuit in late September. He the chance to win several tournaments. Late in the month he played the New South Wales PGA Championship. He opened with an even-par 72 putting him four back of the lead. In the second round, his "accurate putting" led to a four-under-par 68 and a share of the lead with Jack Newton. However, he "collapsed" with rounds of 75 and 76 to finish well behind. The following week he played the West End Tournament. He opened with a 70 to put him in a tie for third with Frank Phillips and Peter Harvey, two back of the lead. Stolhand and Phillips then shot consecutive rounds of 69 and 70 to share the lead. The "brilliant scoring" of both players in the final round "burned off all opposition." On the final hole Stolhand had a one-stroke lead over Phillips. However, he played every sequence of the hole poorly, hitting his drive in the rough, his approach short, and his chip "too firm." On the other hand, Phillips played every sequence of the hole well, hitting his drive into the middle of the fairway and his approach into the middle of the green. Phillips then made his 15-foot birdie putt to temporarily tie. Stolhand needed to make a 12-foot par putt to remain tied. He missed and "had to be content with second money." With a final round 69, Stolhand earned A$475. In November, he played the three-round North Coast Open. Playing against "40 mph southerly" winds, Stolhand opened with a one-over-par 72, one of the rounds of the day. On Saturday, Stolhand again shot around par to stay near the lead. Stolhand played with leader Bill Dunk on the final day. Stolhand matched par on the front nine to stay close. Dunk meanwhile struggled early on the back nine, hitting his drive out of bounds on the 11th and then recording a bogey on the 14th hole. Stolhand, meanwhile, birdied the 14th to tie. Stolhand, however, bogeyed the 15th hole to again fall back. Stolhand then "threw away any chances" on the 16th hole, hitting his tee shot in a drain and taking three to get out. His triple bogey led to a final round 76 and joint fifth place, seven behind champion Dunk.

In 1971, Stolhand again recorded a number of top performances during the first half of the year at minor tournaments in the Australasian region. In January, he recorded a top ten at the Spalding Masters in New Zealand. In May, he finished joint runner-up at the South Australian PGA Championship with Barry Coxon and Bill Dunk, nine behind champion Vic Bennetts. In August, he played the Yass pro-am. At the par-68 course, Stolhand shot round of 69 and 65 to finish in solo second, one behind champion Bennetts. Later in the month, Stolhand played the New South Wales PGA Championship. He finished in a tie for sixth, eight behind champion Kel Nagle. For the remainder of the 1971–72 season, however, Stolhand struggled. At the West End Tournament, which he had nearly won the previous two years, Stolhand shot over-par during the first three rounds and was never in contention. In October, he played the Wills Masters. He made the cut but was "far back," at 230 (+14), after the third round. In March 1972, Stolhand played the two-round Kempsey $2,500 Pro-am. Stolhand opened with a three-under-par 68 to take the lead. However, he shot a final round 77 (+6) and "finished well down."

In late 1972, Stolhand became a club professional at Young Golf Club. During this era, Stolhand still played in some notable tournaments. In the early 1970s, he had much success at pro-ams. In November, 1972, he played the Southern Golf Club pro-am, the day before the Dunlop International. Stolhand shot a 67 (−5), tying the course record, to win by three. In October 1973, he won the Waltons Pro-am, the warm-up before the North Coast Open. In February 1974, Stolhand played the Ampol Liverpool $6,000 pro-am. He captained a four-man team playing against 63 other teams. Stolhand led his team to a 13-under-par total and a "thrilling" one-stroke win over a team led by Barry Burgess. Stolhand also intermittently played the PGA Tour of Australia during this era. His best results were top 20 performances at the 1974 Australian PGA Championship, 1975 Wills Masters, and 1976 Australian PGA Championship.

In the 1980s, Stolhand got a job at as a club professional at Tumut Golf Club in Tumut, New South Wales. During this era, Stolhand had much success at the Australian PGA Seniors Championship. In 1986, Stolhand opened with a 68 (−3) at the event to put him two behind leader, Peter Thomson, one ahead of third place holder Orville Moody. He ultimately finished solo third, only defeated by champion Moody and runner-up Thomson. The following year he finished in fourth place, tied with Thomson. In 1988, Stolhand opened with rounds of 69 and 70 to take a six stroke lead over Kel Nagle. Despite closing with rounds of 73 and 74, he won easily.

== Death ==
On February 1, 1989, Stolhand played a pro-am at Oatlands Golf Course in Oatlands, New South Wales. As he was returning home from the pro-am he was involved in a car accident on Hume Highway at Breadalbane, New South Wales. He was killed in accident. He was 53 years old. He is buried at Young Lawn Cemetery in Young, New South Wales.

After he died, Tumut Golf Course created a golf tournament to honor his legacy. It is called the Jerry Stolhand Memorial Golf Tournament. The event has been part of the PGA Tour of Australasia's Legends Tour.

== Personal life ==
As of 1969, Stolhand was married. Late in life he was married to Pam. He had eight children.

== Amateur wins ==
- 1951 Oklahoma State Junior Championship
- 1952 Oklahoma State Junior Championship
- 1953 Lakeside Golf Championship (amateur division)
- 1965 Fourball tournament at International Golf and Country Club (with Charles Veregee), Kaneohe Bay Youth Activities Association tournament
- 1966 Hawaii State Fourball Medal Tournament (with John DeMello), Army Open Golf Championship (championship flight), Barber's Point Open (championship flight)
- 1967 Barber's Point Open (championship flight)
- 1968 Hawaii State Fourball Golf (with Ron Castillo), Kaneohe Bay Youth Activities Association tournament, Hawaii Amateur

== Professional wins (10) ==
- 1951 Lakeside Invitational Golf Tournament, Ponca City Municipal Golf Tournament
- 1952 Lake Charles Men's City Golf Championship
- 1956 Wichita Pro-Assistant Golf Tournament
- 1958 Louisiana State Open, Louisiana Professional Golf Organization championship
- 1968 Hawaiian Professional Golfers Scotch Medal (with Barrett Melvin), Hawaii PGA Match Play Tournament (consolation bracket)
- 1970 Tamworth Open
- 1988 Australian PGA Seniors Championship

== Team appearances ==
- International Goodwill Golf Tournament (representing the Caucasians): 1966, 1967 (winners)
