= 1963 U.S. Open (golf) =

Coordinates: 42.315°N 71.148°W

Tournament information
- Dates: June 20–23, 1963
- Location: Brookline, Massachusetts
- Course: The Country Club
- Organized by: USGA
- Tour: PGA Tour

Statistics
- Par: 71
- Length: 6,870 yards (6,282 m)
- Field: 148 players, 51 after cut
- Cut: 152 (+10)
- Prize fund: $88,550
- Winner's share: $17,500

Champion
- (United States) Julius Boros
- 293 (+9), playoff

Location in the United States
Location in Massachusetts

The 1963 U.S. Open was the 63rd U.S. Open, held June 20–23 at The Country Club in Brookline, Massachusetts, a suburb southwest of Boston. Julius Boros won his second U.S. Open title in an 18-hole Sunday playoff with Jacky Cupit and Arnold Palmer. The U.S. Open returned to The Country Club for the first time in fifty years to celebrate the golden anniversary of Francis Ouimet's playoff victory in 1913. Boros won eleven years earlier in 1952, and won a third major at age 48 at the PGA Championship in 1968.

At 43, Boros was the second-oldest winner in U.S. Open history, and only a month younger than Ted Ray when he won the 1920 Open. For Palmer, it was the second consecutive year he lost in a playoff at the Open.

High winds made scoring conditions extremely difficult throughout the entire week, especially on Saturday during the final two rounds, when gusts approached 50 mph (80 km/h). The winning score of 293 remains the highest in post-World War II U.S. Open history, while the 77.4 final-round scoring average set a record for the post-war era, later broken in 1972 at Pebble Beach. For the first time in U.S. Open history, no amateur made the cut.

Defending champion and Masters winner Jack Nicklaus missed the cut by a stroke; his next missed cut at the U.S. Open came 22 years later in 1985. He rebounded in the next two majors in 1963, missing the playoff at the Open Championship in England by a stroke for third place and won the PGA Championship in Dallas the following week.

This U.S. Open was played the week after Father's Day.

== Course ==
Composite Course

| Hole | Name | Yards | Par | Hole | Name | Yards | Par |
|---|---|---|---|---|---|---|---|
| 1 | Polo Field | 455 | 4 | 10 | Stockton | 435 | 4 |
| 2 | Cottage | 190 | 3 | 11 | Primrose 1&2 | 445 | 4 |
| 3 | Pond | 440 | 4 | 12 | Primrose 8 | 470 | 4 |
| 4 | Hospital | 340 | 4 | 13 | Primrose 9 | 420 | 4 |
| 5 | Newton | 415 | 4 | 14 | Quarry | 530 | 5 |
| 6 | Bakers | 300 | 4 | 15 | Liverpool | 420 | 4 |
| 7 | Plateau | 200 | 3 | 16 | Clyde | 175 | 3 |
| 8 | Corner | 380 | 4 | 17 | Elbow | 365 | 4 |
| 9 | Himalayas | 505 | 5 | 18 | Home | 385 | 4 |
| Out | | 3,225 | 35 | In | | 3,645 | 36 |
| | | | | Total | | 6,870 | 71 |

== Round summaries ==
=== First round ===
Thursday, June 20, 1963

| Place | Player | Score | To par |
|---|---|---|---|
| 1 | (United States) Bob Gajda | 69 | −2 |
| 2 | (United States) Jacky Cupit | 70 | −1 |
| T3 | (United States) Julius Boros | 71 | E |
| T3 | (United States) Lionel Hebert | 71 | E |
| T3 | (United States) Tony Lema | 71 | E |
| T3 | (United States) Davis Love Jr. | 71 | E |
| T7 | (United States) Walter Burkemo | 72 | +1 |
| T7 | (United States) Don January | 72 | +1 |
| T7 | (United States) Paul Kelly | 72 | +1 |
| T7 | (United States) Dean Refram | 72 | +1 |

=== Second round ===
Friday, June 21, 1963

| Place | Player | Score | To par |
|---|---|---|---|
| T1 | (United States) Jacky Cupit | 70-72=142 | E |
| T1 | (United States) Dow Finsterwald | 73-69=142 | E |
| T1 | (United States) Arnold Palmer | 73-69=142 | E |
| T4 | (United States) Walter Burkemo | 72-71=143 | +1 |
| T4 | (United States) Dean Refram | 72-71=143 | +1 |
| T6 | (United States) Julius Boros | 71-74=145 | +3 |
| T6 | (United States) Tony Lema | 71-74=145 | +3 |
| T6 | (United States) Davis Love Jr. | 71-74=145 | +3 |
| T9 | (Australia) Bruce Crampton | 74-72=146 | +4 |
| T9 | (United States) Don January | 72-74=146 | +4 |
| T9 | (United States) Billy Maxwell | 73-73=146 | +4 |

=== Third round ===
Saturday, June 22, 1963 (morning)

| Place | Player | Score | To par |
|---|---|---|---|
| 1 | (United States) Jacky Cupit | 70-72-76=218 | +5 |
| T2 | (United States) Walter Burkemo | 72-71-76=219 | +6 |
| T2 | (United States) Tony Lema | 71-74-74=219 | +6 |
| T2 | (United States) Arnold Palmer | 73-69-77=219 | +6 |
| T5 | (United States) Julius Boros | 71-74-76=221 | +8 |
| T5 | (Australia) Bruce Crampton | 74-72-75=221 | +8 |
| T5 | (United States) Dow Finsterwald | 73-69-79=221 | +8 |
| T5 | (United States) Paul Harney | 78-70-73=221 | +8 |
| T5 | (United States) Billy Maxwell | 73-73-75=221 | +8 |
| T10 | (United States) Davis Love Jr. | 71-74-78=223 | +10 |
| T10 | (United States) Dan Sikes | 77-73-73=223 | +10 |

=== Final round ===
Saturday, June 22, 1963 (afternoon)

Cupit owned the 54-hole lead by a stroke over Palmer, Tony Lema, and Walter Burkemo, with Boros in a group three behind. Boros recorded two birdies on his final three holes to post a 72 and 293 total. Cupit still held the lead until a double-bogey on the 17th dropped him into a tie with Boros and Palmer. He then missed a 12-foot (3.7 m) putt for birdie at the last that would have won the championship. Palmer came to the par-4 17th hole at 8-over and hit the green in regulation. But he 3-putted from 30 feet, missing a par putt of no more than 2.5 feet. Palmer then made a 6-footer for par on 18th to remain 9-over. Playing several groups in front of the final group of Cupit and Dow Finsterwald, Paul Harney came to the 18th hole at 9-over and went over the back of the green in two. Harney then chipped to some 11 feet below the hole and left his par putt one roll short dead center. Had that putt dropped, he would've ended up in the playoff the next day with Cupit, Palmer and Boros.

| Place | Player | Score | To par | Money ($) |
|---|---|---|---|---|
| T1 | (United States) Julius Boros | 71-74-76-72=293 | +9 | Playoff |
| T1 | (United States) Jacky Cupit | 70-72-76-75=293 | +9 | Playoff |
| T1 | (United States) Arnold Palmer | 73-69-77-74=293 | +9 | Playoff |
| 4 | (United States) Paul Harney | 78-70-73-73=294 | +10 | 5,000 |
| T5 | (Australia) Bruce Crampton | 74-72-75-74=295 | +11 | 3,166 |
| T5 | (United States) Tony Lema | 71-74-74-76=295 | +11 | 3,166 |
| T5 | (United States) Billy Maxwell | 73-73-75-74=295 | +11 | 3,166 |
| T8 | (United States) Walter Burkemo | 72-71-76-77=296 | +12 | 1,875 |
| T8 | (South Africa) Gary Player | 74-75-75-72=296 | +12 | 1,875 |
| 10 | (United States) Dan Sikes | 77-73-73-74=297 | +13 | 1,550 |

=== Playoff ===
Sunday, June 23, 1963

Boros took command early in the playoff and had a three-stroke lead at the turn. Palmer took himself out of contention with a triple-bogey at 11, while Cupit bogeyed the same hole. Boros cruised to the win from there, carding a 70 to Cupit's 73 and Palmer's 76.

First prize was $16,000, and each of the three playoff participants received a bonus of $1,500 from the playoff gate receipts.

| Place | Player | Score | To par | Money ($) |
|---|---|---|---|---|
| 1 | (United States) Julius Boros | 70 | −1 | 17,500 |
| T2 | (United States) Jacky Cupit | 73 | +2 | 8,500 |
| T2 | (United States) Arnold Palmer | 76 | +5 | 8,500 |

- Previously, three-way playoffs determined a third-place finisher (last in 1950); non-winners now tied for second.

==== Scorecard ====
| Hole | 1 | 2 | 3 | 4 | 5 | 6 | 7 | 8 | 9 | 10 | 11 | 12 | 13 | 14 | 15 | 16 | 17 | 18 |
|---|---|---|---|---|---|---|---|---|---|---|---|---|---|---|---|---|---|---|
| Par | 4 | 3 | 4 | 4 | 4 | 4 | 3 | 4 | 5 | 4 | 4 | 4 | 4 | 5 | 4 | 3 | 4 | 4 |
| (United States) Boros | E | +1 | +1 | E | −1 | −1 | −1 | −1 | −2 | −2 | −2 | −2 | E | E | E | E | −1 | −1 |
| (United States) Cupit | E | E | +2 | +2 | +1 | +2 | +2 | +2 | +2 | +2 | +3 | +3 | +3 | +3 | +3 | +3 | +2 | +2 |
| (United States) Palmer | +1 | +1 | +2 | +2 | +2 | +1 | +1 | +1 | +1 | +2 | +5 | +6 | +6 | +7 | +6 | +5 | +6 | +5 |

Cumulative playoff scores, relative to par

| Birdie | Bogey | Double bogey | Triple bogey+ |
