= 1952 U.S. Open (golf) =

Coordinates: 32.932°N 96.7925°W

Tournament information
- Dates: June 12–14, 1952
- Location: Dallas, Texas
- Course: Northwood Club
- Organized by: USGA
- Tour: PGA Tour

Statistics
- Par: 70
- Length: 6,764 yards (6,185 m)
- Field: 142 players, 53 after cut
- Cut: 151 (+11)
- Winner's share: $4,000

Champion
- (United States) Julius Boros
- 281 (+1)

Location in the United States

The 1952 U.S. Open was the 52nd U.S. Open, held June 12–14 at Northwood Club in Dallas, Texas. Julius Boros captured the first of his three major titles, four strokes ahead of runner-up Ed Oliver.

Two-time defending champion Ben Hogan, raised in nearby Fort Worth, attempted to become the second to win three consecutive U.S. Opens, and with two rounds of 69 he had the 36-hole lead, two strokes ahead of George Fazio. But consecutive rounds of 74 in the Saturday heat dropped Hogan back to third place, five strokes behind. Boros carded a third-round 68 to take a two-stroke lead, then shot a 71 for a 281 total and waited in the clubhouse to see if anyone would catch him, but none did. The closest was Oliver with a 72 to finish at 285, four behind Boros. Temperatures reached 98 °F (37 °C) under sunny skies on Saturday, with a gallery estimated at 15,000.

Hogan was admittedly affected by the heat, and his final round included an out-of-bounds approach shot on the dogleg par-4 sixth hole and numerous three-putts. Boros successfully scrambled during both rounds on Saturday, chipping close and making lengthy putts. Hogan told Boros he was "a magician."

It was Boros' first win on the PGA Tour at the age of 32; just three years earlier he reached the quarterfinals of the U.S. Amateur. Boros won 17 more times as a professional, including a second U.S. Open in 1963. Five years later he won the PGA Championship in 1968 at age 48, the oldest ever to win a major championship until surpassed by Phil Mickelson in 2021.

Hogan regained the title in 1953 for four U.S. Open wins in five attempts (he won his first in 1948 and did not enter in 1949 due to a near-fatal automobile accident). Through 2015, Willie Anderson remains the only winner of three consecutive U.S. Opens, with titles in 1903, 1904, and 1905. The only repeat winners since 1951 are Curtis Strange in 1989 and Brooks Koepka in 2018.

The PGA Championship in 1952 was played the following week in Louisville, Kentucky. Boros was not eligible as he had been a pro less than five years, but received a special invitation from the PGA of America. He withdrew before his start time of the stroke-play qualifier on Wednesday after dissension from other players.

Boros' wife had died the previous September during the birth of their only child, son Jay.

== Round summaries ==
=== First round ===
Thursday, June 12, 1952

Place	Player	Score	To par
1	(United States) Al Brosch	68	−2
2	(United States) Ben Hogan	69	−1
T3	(United States) Sam Snead	70	E
T3	(United States) Dick Metz	70	E
T3	(United States) Horton Smith	70	E
T6	(United States) Charlie Bassler	71	+1
T6	(United States) Julius Boros	71	+1
T6	(United States) Clarence Doser	71	+1
T6	(United States) Zell Eaton	71	+1
T6	(United States) Charles Farlow	71	+1
T6	(United States) George Fazio	71	+1
T6	(United States) Dutch Harrison	71	+1
T6	(United States) Ted Kroll	71	+1
T6	(United States) Stanton Mosel	71	+1
T6	(United States) Ed Oliver	71	+1
T6	(United States) Harry Todd	71	+1

=== Second round ===
Friday, June 13, 1952

Place	Player	Score	To par
1	(United States) Ben Hogan	69-69=138	−2
2	(United States) George Fazio	71-69=140	E
3	(United States) Johnny Bulla	73-68=141	+1
4	(United States) Julius Boros	71-71=142	+2
T5	(United States) Ed Oliver	71-72=143	+3
T5	(United States) Horton Smith	70-73=143	+3
T5	(United States) Lew Worsham	72-71=143	+3
T8	(United States) Clarence Doser	71-73=144	+4
T8	(United States) Dick Metz	70-74=144	+4
T10	(United States) Charles Scally	72-73=145	+5
T10	(United States) Sam Snead	70-75=145	+5
T10	(United States) Bill Trombley	72-73=145	+5

=== Third round ===
Saturday, June 14, 1952 (morning)

Place	Player	Score	To par
1	(United States) Julius Boros	71-71-68=210	E
2	(United States) Ben Hogan	69-69-74=212	+2
3	(United States) Ed Oliver	71-72-70=213	+3
4	(United States) Johnny Bulla	73-68-73=214	+4
5	(United States) George Fazio	71-69-75=215	+5
T6	(United States) Clarence Doser	71-73-73=217	+7
T6	(United States) Lew Worsham	72-71-74=217	+7
T8	(United States) Tommy Bolt	72-76-71=219	+9
T8	(United States) Horton Smith	70-73-76=219	+9
T8	(United States) Bo Wininger	78-72-69=219	+9

=== Final round ===
Saturday, June 14, 1952 (afternoon)

Place	Player	Score	To par	Money ($)
1	(United States) Julius Boros	71-71-68-71=281	+1	4,000
2	(United States) Ed Oliver	71-72-70-72=285	+5	2,500
3	(United States) Ben Hogan	69-69-74-74=286	+6	1,000
4	(United States) Johnny Bulla	73-68-73-73=287	+7	800
5	(United States) George Fazio	71-69-75-75=290	+10	600
6	(United States) Dick Metz	70-74-76-71=291	+11	500
T7	(United States) Tommy Bolt	72-76-71-73=292	+12	350
T7	(United States) Ted Kroll	71-75-76-70=292	+12	350
T7	(United States) Lew Worsham	72-71-74-75=292	+12	350
T10	(United States) Lloyd Mangrum	75-74-72-72=293	+13	200
T10	(United States) Sam Snead	70-75-76-72=293	+13	200
T10	(United States) Earl Stewart	76-75-70-72=293	+13	200
