= Pecan Valley Golf Club =

Defunct golf club in Texas, United States

- Location within the United States Location within Texas
- 29.377°N 98.431°W

Club information
- Location: 4700 Pecan Valley Drive; San Antonio, Texas, U.S.
- Elevation: 590 feet (180 m)
- Established: 1963 (closed 2012)
- Operator: Foresight Golf Management
- Tota holes: 18
- Tournaments: PGA Championship (1968); Texas Open Invitational (1967–1970)
- Designed by: J. Press Maxwell (1963); Bob Cupp (1998 renovation)
- Par: 71
- Length: 7,010 yards (6,410 m)
- Course rating: 73.9
- Slope rating: 131

Pecan Valley Golf Club was a golf club in the southern United States, located in San Antonio, Texas. Opened in 1963, the golf course was designed by J. Press Maxwell and was renovated in 1998 by Bob Cupp. It hosted the PGA Championship in 1968, won by 48-year-old Julius Boros for his third major title.

Pecan Valley was the site of the Alamo Ladies' Open on the LPGA Tour (1963–1966), the Texas Open Invitational on the PGA Tour (1967–1970), and the U.S. Amateur Public Links in 2001.

Pecan Valley ceased operations in January 2012, the first major championship venue closed in the U.S. since Pomonok Country Club in Queens, New York, host of the PGA Championship in 1939, was sold in 1949. It is not known when play will be permitted again; development on a portion of the property began in 2015. Plans are for development of a new nine-hole par-3 course, built to championship golf standards and designed for people with limited mobility and provide specialized equipment.
