= Hugh Royer =

Hugh Royer may refer to:

- Hugh Royer Jr. (1936–2014), American professional golfer
- Hugh Royer III (born 1964), his son, American golfer and golf instructor
