= Frank Boynton (golfer) =

American professional golfer (1936–2024)

Personal information
- Full name: Frank Ellis Boynton III
- Nationality: United States
- Born: August 26, 1936 Tampa, Florida, U.S.
- Died: June 13, 2024 (aged 87) Kerrville, Texas, U.S.
- Spouse: Betty Jordan
- Children: 2

Career
- Sport: Golf
- College: Rollins College
- Turned professional: 1956
- Former tour: PGA Tour
- Professional wins: 2

Best results in major championships
- Masters Tournament: CUT: 1969
- PGA Championship: T8: 1968
- U.S. Open: 27th: 1962
- The Open Championship: DNP

Frank Ellis Boynton III (August 26, 1936 – June 13, 2024) was an American professional golfer.

== Early life and amateur career ==
Boynton was born in Tampa, Florida and grew up in Orlando, Florida. He played college golf at Rollins College.

== Professional career ==
In 1956, Boynton turned professional. Boynton played on the PGA Tour from 1958 to 1963 and again from 1967 to 1969. His best finishes were a 2nd at the 1962 St. Petersburg Open Invitational and a T-2 at the 1968 Tucson Open Invitational. His best finish in a major was a T-8 at the 1968 PGA Championship.

After leaving the PGA Tour, Boynton started a financial services company in Kerrville, Texas called Boynton Financial.

Boytnon died on June 13, 2024 in Kerrville.

== Professional wins (2) ==
- 1966 Ohio Open
- 1967 Ohio Open
