= Carling World Open =

Golf tournament in Ontario, Canada

Tournament information
- Location: Toronto, Ontario, Canada
- Established: 1953
- Course: Board of Trade Country Club
- Par: 72
- Tour: PGA Tour
- Format: Stroke play
- Prize fund: US$175,000
- Month played: September
- Final year: 1967

Tournament record score
- Aggregate: 274 Dow Finsterwald (1956)
- To par: −14 as above

Final champion
- (United States) Billy Casper
- Location in Canada Location in Ontario

The Carling World Open was the last incarnation in a series of golf tournaments on the PGA Tour sponsored by the Carling Brewing Company beginning in 1953.

== Winners ==
| Year | Winner | Score | To par | Margin of victory | Runner(s)-up | Venue |
Carling World Open
| 1967 | (United States) Billy Casper | 281 | −3 | Playoff | (United States) Al Geiberger | Board of Trade, Canada |
| 1966 | (Australia) Bruce Devlin | 286 | −6 | 1 stroke | (United States) Billy Casper | Royal Birkdale, England |
| 1965 | (United States) Tony Lema | 279 | −5 | 2 strokes | (United States) Arnold Palmer | Pleasant Valley, Massachusetts |
| 1964 | (United States) Bobby Nichols | 278 | −2 | 1 stroke | (United States) Arnold Palmer | Oakland Hills, Michigan |
1963: No tournament
Carling Open Invitational
| 1962 | (United States) Bo Wininger | 274 | −10 | 1 stroke | (United States) Bert Weaver | Rio Pinar, Florida |
| 1961 | (United States) Gay Brewer | 277 | −3 | 1 stroke | (United States) Billy Maxwell | Indian Springs, Maryland |
| 1960 | (United States) Ernie Vossler | 272 | −12 | 1 stroke | (United States) Paul Harney | Fircrest, Washington |
| 1959 | (United States) Dow Finsterwald (2) | 276 | −8 | 1 stroke | (United States) Gene Littler (United States) Mike Souchak | Seneca, Ohio |
| 1958 | (United States) Julius Boros (2) | 284 | −4 | 2 strokes | (United States) Billy Casper | Cherokee Town, Georgia |
| 1957 | (United States) Paul Harney | 275 | −9 | 3 strokes | (United States) Dow Finsterwald | Flint, Michigan |
| 1956 | (United States) Dow Finsterwald | 274 | −14 | 3 strokes | (United States) Jack Burke Jr. (United States) Billy Casper (United States) Billy Maxwell | Sunset, Missouri |
Carling Golf Classic
| 1955 | (United States) Doug Ford | 276 | −12 | 1 stroke | (United States) Art Wall Jr. | Charles River, Massachusetts |
Carling Open
| 1954 | (United States) Julius Boros | 280 | −8 | Playoff | (United States) George Fazio | Manakiki, Ohio |
| 1953 | (United States) Cary Middlecoff | 275 | −13 | Playoff | (United States) Ted Kroll | Manakiki, Ohio |
