= Yantis High School =

Location
- 105 West Oak Street; Yantis, Texas 75497; United States; 32.929969°N 95.577446°W

Information
- School type: Public high school
- School district: Yantis Independent School District
- NCES School ID: 484659005298
- Principal: Austin Baxley
- Teaching staff: 17.90 (FTE)
- Grades: 6-12
- Enrollment: 175 (2023-2024)
- Student to teacher ratio: 9.78
- Colors: Blue & White
- Athletics conference: UIL Class 2A
- Mascot: Owls/Lady Owls
- Website: Yantis Independent School District

Yantis High School is a public high school located in Yantis, Texas (USA). It is part of the Yantis Independent School District located in northwest Wood County and classified as a 2A school by the UIL. In 2015, the school was rated "Met Standard" by the Texas Education Agency.

== Athletics ==
The Yantis Owls compete in these sports -

- Baseball
- Basketball
- Cross Country
- Golf
- Tennis
- Track and Field
- Volleyball

=== State Titles ===
- One Act Play -
  - 2002(1A)
