= Enrique Orellana =

Chilean golfer

Enrique Orellana (born c. 1936) is a retired Chilean professional golfer. Orellana had the distinction of being the only Chilean golfer in history to participate in the Masters Tournament (1964) until Matías Domínguez played in the tournament in 2015. Toto Gana (2017) and Joaquín Niemann (2018) also qualified for the Masters, by winning the Latin America Amateur Championship in their respective years. Martín Ureta, Hugo León, and Guillermo Pereira, who played in the U.S. Open in 2007, 2010, and 2019, respectively, are other Chileans who have played in a major golf championship.

Orellana grew up son of the greenskeeper of Los Leones Golf Club in Santiago, Chile. His invitation to the Masters was a matter of talent combined with being in the right place at the right time. In addition to playing golf professionally, Orellana instructed golf classes at the club. One of his pupils was Argentinian politician Guillermo Kelly. Kelly had played Augusta National Golf Club a week before the Masters in 1963. In November 1963, Kelly played Los Leones and was one player short of a foursome. He invited Orellana to complete the group. After nine holes of play, when Orellana was four shots under par, Kelly told Orellana, "I'm going to get you an invitation to the Masters." Kelly was friends with the president of Augusta National, Bobby Jones. In March 1964, Orellana received an envelope with an Augusta postmark containing the invitation.

After finishing runner-up in the 1964 Masters Par 3 contest, Orellana missed the cut at the tournament. He noted that he had to adapt to playing with a larger golf ball than the "British ball" that was used in South America.

Orellana won the Chile Open in 1960 and 1963 and the inaugural Argentine Masters in 1961.

== Team appearances ==
- World Cup (representing Chile): 1957, 1958, 1959, 1960, 1961, 1962, 1963, 1964, 1965, 1968
