= James Mason (golfer) =

American professional golfer (born 1951)

Personal information
- Full name: James D. Mason
- Nationality: United States
- Born: January 7, 1951 (age 75) Duluth, Georgia, U.S.
- Height: 5 ft 10 in (1.78 m)
- Weight: 240 lb (110 kg; 17 st)

Career
- Sport: Golf
- College: Auburn University
- Turned professional: 1973
- Current tour: Champions Tour
- Professional wins: 5

Number of wins by tour
- PGA Tour Champions: 1
- Other: 4

Best results in major championships
- Masters Tournament: CUT: 1977
- PGA Championship: CUT: 1997
- U.S. Open: WD: 1978
- The Open Championship: DNP

James D. Mason (born January 7, 1951) is an American professional golfer.

== Career ==
Mason was born in Duluth, Georgia. He graduated in 1973 from Auburn University in Auburn, Alabama, with a degree in Business Administration. He turned professional in 1973.

Mason joined the Senior PGA Tour in 2001 and won once, the 2002 NFL Golf Classic.

== Professional wins (5) ==
=== Regular career wins (4) ===
- 1997 Georgia PGA Championship
- 1999 Georgia PGA Championship
- 2000 Georgia PGA Championship
- 2015 Georgia PGA Championship

=== Champions Tour wins (1) ===
No.	Date	Tournament	Winning score	Margin of victory	Runners-up
1	Jun 2, 2002	NFL Golf Classic	−9 (65-73-69=207)	2 strokes	(United States) Dave Eichelberger, (United States) Bruce Fleisher, (United States) Morris Hatalsky

Champions Tour playoff record (0–1)

No.	Year	Tournament	Opponent	Result
1	2011	Greater Hickory Classic at Rock Barn	(United States) Mark Wiebe	Lost to par on third extra hole
