= 1969 Open Championship =

Coordinates: 53.7495°N 3.0180°W

Tournament information
- Dates: 9–12 July 1969
- Location: Lytham St Annes, England
- Course: Royal Lytham & St Annes Golf Club

Statistics
- Par: 71
- Length: 6,848 yards (6,262 m)
- Field: 130 players 73 after 1st cut 46 after 2nd cut
- Cut: 151 (+9) (1st cut); 222 (+9) (2nd cut)
- Prize fund: £30,000 $72,000
- Winner's share: £4,250 $10,200

Champion
- (England) Tony Jacklin
- 280 (−4)

Location in England

The 1969 Open Championship was the 98th Open Championship, held from 9–12 July at the Royal Lytham & St Annes Golf Club in Lytham St Annes, England. Tony Jacklin won the first of his two major championships, two strokes ahead of Bob Charles.

Jacklin was the first Briton to win The Open since 1951, and it was another sixteen years until the next, Sandy Lyle in 1985.

It was the fifth Open Championship at Lytham & St Annes, which has hosted eleven times, most recently in 2012.

== Round summaries ==
=== First round ===
Wednesday, 9 July 1969

| Place | Player | Score | To par |
|---|---|---|---|
| 1 | (New Zealand) Bob Charles | 66 | −5 |
| T2 | (England) Tony Jacklin | 68 | −3 |
| T2 | (England) Hedley Muscroft | 68 | −3 |
| T4 | (United States) Miller Barber | 69 | −2 |
| T4 | (France) Jean Garaïalde | 69 | −2 |
| T4 | (Northern Ireland) Hugh Jackson | 69 | −2 |
| T7 | (United States) Billy Casper | 70 | −1 |
| T7 | (Scotland) Bernard Gallacher | 70 | −1 |
| T7 | (United States) Davis Love Jr. | 70 | −1 |
| T7 | (England) Guy Wolstenholme | 70 | −1 |

=== Second round ===
Thursday, 10 July 1969

| Place | Player | Score | To par |
|---|---|---|---|
| 1 | (New Zealand) Bob Charles | 66-69=135 | −7 |
| 2 | (Republic of Ireland) Christy O'Connor Snr | 71-65=136 | −6 |
| T3 | (England) Alex Caygill | 71-67=138 | −4 |
| T3 | (England) Tony Jacklin | 68-70=138 | −4 |
| 5 | (United States) Billy Casper | 70-70=140 | −2 |
| T6 | (United States) Orville Moody | 71-70=141 | −1 |
| T6 | (Australia) Peter Thomson | 71-70=141 | −1 |
| T6 | (England) Guy Wolstenholme | 70-71=141 | −1 |
| T9 | (Scotland) John Panton | 73-69=142 | E |
| T9 | (South Africa) Gary Player | 74-68=142 | E |

Amateurs: Tupling (+2), Bonallack (+4), Fleisher (+5), Buckley (+6), Humphreys (+8), McGuirk (+8),
R. Foster (+11), Hayes (+13), Kippax (+16), King (+17), Glading (+20)

=== Third round ===
Friday, 11 July 1969

| Place | Player | Score | To par |
|---|---|---|---|
| 1 | (England) Tony Jacklin | 68-70-70=208 | −5 |
| T2 | (New Zealand) Bob Charles | 66-69-75=210 | −3 |
| T2 | (Republic of Ireland) Christy O'Connor Snr | 71-65-74=210 | −3 |
| T4 | (Argentina) Roberto De Vicenzo | 72-73-66=211 | −2 |
| T4 | (Australia) Peter Thomson | 71-70-70=211 | −2 |
| T6 | (Wales) Brian Huggett | 72-72-69=213 | E |
| T6 | (United States) Jack Nicklaus | 75-70-68=213 | E |
| T8 | (United States) Davis Love Jr. | 70-73-71=214 | +1 |
| T8 | (United States) Bert Yancey | 72-71-71=214 | +1 |
| T10 | (United States) Gay Brewer | 76-71-68=215 | +2 |
| T10 | (United States) Billy Casper | 70-70-75=215 | +2 |
| T10 | (United States) Orville Moody | 71-70-74=215 | +2 |

Amateurs: Bonallack (+6), Tupling (+9), Buckley (+10), Fleisher (+10), Humphreys (+12), McGuirk (+15).

=== Final round ===
Saturday, 12 July 1969

| Place | Player | Score | To par | Money (£) |
|---|---|---|---|---|
| 1 | (England) Tony Jacklin | 68-70-70-72=280 | −4 | 4,250 |
| 2 | (New Zealand) Bob Charles | 66-69-75-72=282 | −2 | 3,000 |
| T3 | (Argentina) Roberto De Vicenzo | 72-73-66-72=283 | −1 | 2,125 |
| T3 | (Australia) Peter Thomson | 71-70-70-72=283 | −1 | 2,125 |
| 5 | (Republic of Ireland) Christy O'Connor Snr | 71-65-74-74=284 | E | 1,750 |
| T6 | (United States) Davis Love Jr. | 70-73-71-71=285 | +1 | 1,375 |
| T6 | (United States) Jack Nicklaus | 75-70-68-72=285 | +1 | 1,375 |
| 8 | (England) Peter Alliss | 73-74-73-66=286 | +2 | 1,100 |
| 9 | (Australia) Kel Nagle | 74-71-72-70=287 | +3 | 1,000 |
| 10 | (United States) Miller Barber | 69-75-75-69=288 | +4 | 900 |

Amateurs: Tupling (+10), Bonallack (+14)
