= Marty Fleckman =

American professional golfer

Personal information
- Full name: Martin Alan Fleckman
- Nationality: United States
- Born: April 23, 1944 (age 82) Port Arthur, Texas, U.S.
- Height: 5 ft 10 in (1.78 m)
- Weight: 170 lb (77 kg; 12 st)

Career
- Sport: Golf
- College: University of Houston
- Turned professional: 1967
- Former tour: PGA Tour
- Professional wins: 1

Number of wins by tour
- PGA Tour: 1

Best results in major championships
- Masters Tournament: CUT: 1969
- PGA Championship: T4: 1968
- U.S. Open: T18: 1967
- The Open Championship: DNP

Martin Alan Fleckman (born April 23, 1944) is an American professional golfer who played on the PGA Tour in the 1960s and 1970s.

== Early life and amateur career ==
In 1944, Fleckman was born in Port Arthur, Texas. Fleckman credits Byron Nelson, Carl Lohren, and Jim Hardy with teaching him how to play golf. At the age of 20 in 1964, Fleckman won the individual title at the Texas State Amateur. In 1965, he won the NCAA Championship while at the University of Houston, where he was a three-time All-American member of the golf team: third-team in 1964, first-team in 1965 and 1966. He competed for the United States in Israel in the 1965 Maccabiah Games. He was a member of the Walker Cup team in 1967.

While still an amateur, Fleckman played in the U.S. Open at Baltusrol in 1967. He led after the first and third rounds, but shot 80 (+10) on Sunday amid a surge by eventual champion Jack Nicklaus. The last amateur to lead the U.S. Open at 54 holes was Johnny Goodman, 34 years earlier in 1933. (Seven years earlier in 1960, Nicklaus led as an amateur during the final round.) Fleckman finished in a tie for 18th place and was the low amateur, a stroke ahead of Bob Murphy, who shot 69 in the final round.

== Professional career ==
In his first start on the PGA Tour in December 1967, Fleckman won the Cajun Classic Open Invitational in a playoff. At Oakbourne Country Club in Lafayette, Louisiana, he sank a 30-foot (9 m) birdie putt on the first extra hole to defeat Jack Montgomery and take the winner's share of $5,000. It was his third consecutive birdie, finishing regulation play with two. Fleckman is only one of five other players to win his first tour event as a professional, and has since been joined by Ben Crenshaw (1973), Robert Gamez (1990), Garrett Willis (2001), and Russell Henley (2013). This was to be his only Tour title. His best finish in a major was a tie for fourth at the PGA Championship in 1968.

He currently works as director of golf instruction at Blackhorse Teaching Center in Texas.

== Awards and honors ==
- In 1986, Fleckman was inducted into the Texas Golf Hall of Fame.
- In 2006, he was inducted into the University of Houston Hall of Honor.
- In 2007, Fleckman received the Teacher of the Year Award for the Southern Texas Section of the PGA.

== Amateur wins (4) ==
- 1964 Texas State Amateur
- 1965 NCAA Championship
- 1966 Eastern Amateur
- 1967 Northeast Amateur

== Professional wins (1) ==
=== PGA Tour wins (1) ===
No.	Date	Tournament	Winning score	To par	Margin of victory	Runner-up
1	Dec 3, 1967	Cajun Classic Open Invitational	67-68-71-69=275	−13	Playoff	(United States) Jack Montgomery

PGA Tour playoff record (1–0)

No.	Year	Tournament	Opponent	Result
1	1967	Cajun Classic Open Invitational	(United States) Jack Montgomery	Won with birdie on first extra hole

== Results in major championships ==
Tournament	1967	1968	1969	1970	1971	1972	1973	1974	1975	1976	1977	1978
Masters Tournament			CUT									
U.S. Open	T18 LA	CUT							60		WD	CUT
PGA Championship		T4										

Note: Fleckman never played in The Open Championship.

Top 10
Did not play

LA = Low amateur
CUT = missed the half-way cut
WD = withdrew
"T" = tied

== Team appearances ==
Amateur

- Walker Cup: 1967 (winners)

== See also ==
- 1967 PGA Tour Qualifying School graduates
