= Paul Claxton =

American professional golfer (born 1968)

Personal information
- Nationality: United States
- Born: February 9, 1968 (age 58) Vidalia, Georgia, U.S.
- Height: 6 ft 0 in (1.83 m)
- Weight: 150 lb (68 kg; 11 st)

Career
- Sport: Golf
- College: University of Georgia
- Turned professional: 1993
- Former tours: PGA Tour; Nationwide Tour; Hooters Jordan Tour
- Professional wins: 7

Number of wins by tour
- Korn Ferry Tour: 2
- Other: 5

Best results in major championships
- Masters Tournament: DNP
- PGA Championship: CUT: 2017
- U.S. Open: T23: 2005
- The Open Championship: DNP

Paul Claxton (born February 9, 1968) is an American professional golfer.

== Early life and amateur career ==
Claxton was born and raised in Vidalia, Georgia. He attended the University of Georgia and was a member of the golf team. He majored in Business and graduated in 1992.

== Professional career ==
In 1993, Claxton turn professional. He was a member of the PGA Tour in 1997, 2002, 2005 and 2008. He was a member of the Nationwide Tour in 1995-96, 1998–2001, 2003–04, 2006–07 and 2009-10. When he won the 2007 Melwood Prince George's County Open, he surpassed $1,000,000 in earnings on the Nationwide Tour becoming the first player to do so.

Claxton has participated in two majors, including the 2005 U.S. Open. He finished tied for 23rd.

After Claxton's touring career ended, he became a club professional in Georgia. He qualified for the 2017 PGA Championship through the PGA Professional Championship.

== Personal life ==
Claxton lives in Vidalia, Georgia.

== Amateur wins ==
- 1991 Sunnehanna Amateur

== Professional wins (7) ==
=== Nationwide Tour wins (2) ===
No.	Date	Tournament	Winning score	Margin of victory	Runners-up
1	Apr 1, 2001	Buy.com Louisiana Open	−17 (68-66-70-67=271)	1 stroke	(United States) Tim Petrovic, (United States) Steve Runge
2	May 27, 2007	Melwood Prince George's County Open	−18 (70-66-67-67=270)	1 stroke	(United States) James Driscoll, (South Africa) Jaco van Zyl

Nationwide Tour playoff record (0–2)

No.	Year	Tournament	Opponent	Result
1	2006	Henrico County Open	(United States) Matt Kuchar	Lost to birdie on third extra hole
2	2007	Chitimacha Louisiana Open	(United States) Skip Kendall	Lost to birdie on third extra hole

=== Hooters Jordan Tour wins (2) ===
No.	Date	Tournament	Winning score	Margin of victory	Runner-up
1	Apr 25, 1993	John Crosland/Charleston National Golf Classic	−1 (73-69-73-72=287)	2 strokes	(United States) Marion Dantzler
2	Apr 10, 1994	Top-Flite Classic	−13 (69-68-68-70=275)	5 strokes	(United States) Joe Durant

=== Other wins (3) ===
- 2017 Georgia Open
- 2018 Georgia PGA Championship
- 2019 Georgia PGA Championship

== Results in major championships ==
Tournament	2005	2006	2007	2008	2009	2010	2011	2012	2013	2014	2015	2016	2017
U.S. Open	T23							CUT					
PGA Championship													CUT

Did not play

CUT = missed the half-way cut
"T" = tied
Note: Claxton never played in the Masters Tournament or The Open Championship.

== U.S. national team appearances ==
- PGA Cup: 2017

== See also ==
- 1996 PGA Tour Qualifying School graduates
- 2001 PGA Tour Qualifying School graduates
- 2004 PGA Tour Qualifying School graduates
- 2007 Nationwide Tour graduates
