= DeWitt Weaver (golfer) =

American professional golfer (1939–2021)

Personal information
- Full name: DeWitt Thompson Weaver Jr.
- Nationality: United States
- Born: September 14, 1939 Danville, Kentucky, U.S.
- Died: March 18, 2021 (aged 81) Suwanee, Georgia, U.S.
- Height: 5 ft 11 in (1.80 m)
- Weight: 185 lb (84 kg; 13.2 st)
- Spouse: Sheri
- Children: 4

Career
- Sport: Golf
- College: Southern Methodist University
- Turned professional: 1964
- Former tours: PGA Tour; Champions Tour
- Professional wins: 30

Number of wins by tour
- PGA Tour: 2
- PGA Tour Champions: 1
- Other: 27

Best results in major championships
- Masters Tournament: 47th: 1972
- PGA Championship: T33: 1972
- U.S. Open: T54: 1970
- The Open Championship: T18: 1974

DeWitt Thompson Weaver Jr. (September 14, 1939 – March 18, 2021) was an American golf consultant and professional golfer who played on the PGA Tour and the Senior PGA Tour.

== Early life ==
Weaver was born in Danville, Kentucky. He spent part of his youth there and in Lubbock, Texas, where his father was the head football coach at Texas Tech in the 1950s. In high school, he excelled in a number of sports.

== Amateur career ==
After graduation, he enrolled at Southern Methodist University, where he was a multisport letterman. Weaver moved to Georgia after college and became a dominant player in Georgia amateur golf.

== Professional career ==
In 1964, Weaver turned professional. He competed on the PGA Tour from 1967 to 1976, winning twice in the early 1970s. His best year as a professional golfer was 1971 when he finished in the top-25 on the PGA Tour money list.

After reaching the age of 50 in September 1989, Weaver began competing on the Senior PGA TOUR. His lone win in this venue came in 1991 at the Bank One Senior Classic. Rallying from five shots down on the final day, he defeated J. C. Snead in a playoff with a birdie on the second hole.

After retiring as a touring professional, Weaver held club pro positions at Sea Palms, Sky Valley and Innsbruck golf clubs. He ran a golf consulting company, DeWitt Weaver Golf Solutions LLC, with his children. Weaver also started junior golf programs at St. Simons Island and Rabun County High Schools at opposite ends of the state of Georgia.

== Personal life ==
Weaver lived in Braselton, Georgia, with wife, Sheri. He was a spiritual man of strong Christian faith.

Weaver died at his home in Suwanee, Georgia, on March 18, 2021.

== Awards and honors ==
- In 1980 and 1981, Weaver was the Georgia PGA Player of the year.
- In 1998, he was inducted into the Georgia Golf Hall of Fame.
- In 2003, he was inducted into the Georgia Sports Hall of Fame.
- In 2004, he was inducted into the Northeast Georgia Sports Hall of Fame.

== Professional wins (30) ==
=== PGA Tour wins (2) ===
No.	Date	Tournament	Winning score	Margin of victory	Runner-up
1	Aug 29, 1971	Liggett & Myers Open Match Play Championship	−1 (71)	6 strokes	(United States) Phil Rodgers
2	Sep 10, 1972	Southern Open	−4 (65-67-72-72=276)	Playoff	(United States) Chuck Courtney

PGA Tour playoff record (1–0)

No.	Year	Tournament	Opponent	Result
1	1972	Southern Open	(United States) Chuck Courtney	Won with par on first extra hole

=== Other wins (18) ===
- 1964 Louisiana State Open
- 1966 Georgia PGA Championship, Dixie PGA
- 1969 Atlanta Open
- 1970 Georgia PGA Championship
- 1971 Atlanta Open, Georgia PGA Championship, Dalton Invitational
- 1972 Georgia Open
- 1973 Georgia Open
- 1974 Georgia PGA Championship
- 1977 Georgia Open
- 1978 Georgia PGA Championship
- 1979 Georgia Open, Georgia PGA Championship, Georgia Match Play Championship
- 1984 Georgia PGA Championship
- 1988 Houston Lake Invitational

=== Senior PGA Tour wins (1) ===
No.	Date	Tournament	Winning score	Margin of victory	Runner-up
1	Sep 29, 1991	Bank One Senior Classic	−9 (70-72-65=207)	Playoff	(United States) J. C. Snead

Senior PGA Tour playoff record (1–0)

No.	Year	Tournament	Opponent	Result
1	1991	Bank One Senior Classic	(United States) J. C. Snead	Won with birdie on second extra hole

=== Other senior career wins (9) ===
- 2004 Landings Senior Classic
- 2005 Doublegate Senior Classic
- 2006 Dalton Beverage Senior Classic
- 2008 Waycross Senior Classic
- 2009 Dan Parish Senior Classic
- 2010 Georgia PGA Seniors, Georgia Section Senior Junior
- 2011 Hard Labor Creek Senior Classic
- 2014 Weaver Cup

== See also ==
- 1966 PGA Tour Qualifying School graduates
