= Georgia Open =

The Georgia Open is the Georgia (USA) state open golf tournament, open to both amateur and professional golfers. It is organized by the Georgia section of the PGA of America. It has been played annually since 1954 at a variety of courses around the state.

== Winners ==
- 2026 Hughes Threlkeld
- 2025 Nate Gahman (a)
- 2024 Kyle Mueller
- 2023 Kam Williams
- 2022 Austin Morrison
- 2021 Matt Nagy
- 2020 Jonathan Keppler
- 2019 Barrett Waters
- 2018 Timothy O'Neal
- 2017 Paul Claxton
- 2016 Shad Tuten
- 2015 Davin White (a)
- 2014 Jay McLuen
- 2013 Jonathan Fricke
- 2012 Jonathan Fricke
- 2011 Jay McLuen
- 2010 Samuel Del Val
- 2009 Roberto Castro
- 2008 Bryant Odom
- 2007 Jeff Hull
- 2006 Jared Garrity
- 2005 Tim Conley
- 2004 Tim Weinhart
- 2003 Justin Bolli
- 2002 Jody Bellflower
- 2001 Dave Schreyer
- 2000 Jody Bellflower
- 1999 Dicky Thompson
- 1998 Dicky Thompson
- 1997 Louis Brown
- 1996 Dave Schreyer
- 1995 Stephen Keppler
- 1994 Stephen Keppler
- 1993 Matt Peterson
- 1992 Franklin Langham
- 1991 Gregg Wolff
- 1990 Mark Jordan
- 1989 Franklin Langham (a)
- 1988 DeWitt Weaver III (a)
- 1987 Tim Simpson
- 1986 Gene Sauers
- 1985 Gene Sauers
- 1984 Tim Simpson
- 1983 Gene Sauers
- 1982 Barry Harwell
- 1981 Tim Simpson
- 1980 Tim Simpson, Bob Tway (a)
- 1979 DeWitt Weaver
- 1978 Larry Nelson
- 1977 DeWitt Weaver
- 1976 Paul Moran
- 1975 Tommy Aaron
- 1974 Joe Kunes (a), Paul Moran
- 1973 DeWitt Weaver
- 1972 DeWitt Weaver
- 1971 George Johnson
- 1970 Ted Hayes Jr.
- 1969 Ted Hayes Jr.
- 1968 Hugh Royer Jr.
- 1967 Lyn Lott (a)
- 1966 John Ferguson
- 1965 Steve Melnyk
- 1964 Dick Cannon
- 1963 Emory Lee
- 1962 Jim Stamps
- 1961 Dick Cline
- 1960 Tommy Aaron
- 1959 R. L. Miller
- 1958 Jim Stamps
- 1957 Tommy Aaron (a)
- 1956 Hugh Moore
- 1955 Dick Cline
- 1954 Charlie Harper

a = amateur
