= Matt Peterson =

American golfer (born 1967)

Personal information
- Nationality: United States
- Born: April 26, 1967 (age 59) Chicago, Illinois, U.S.
- Height: 6 ft 0 in (1.83 m)
- Weight: 165 lb (75 kg; 11.8 st)

Career
- Sport: Golf
- College: University of Georgia
- Turned professional: 1990
- Former tours: PGA Tour; Nike Tour; U.S. Golf Tour
- Professional wins: 5

Number of wins by tour
- Korn Ferry Tour: 1
- Other: 4

Matt Peterson (born April 26, 1967) is an American professional golfer.

== Early life and amateur career ==
Peterson was born in Chicago, Illinois. He went to school in Morganton, North Carolina before enrolling at the University of Georgia to study management and information technology. There he was a member of the golf team and became a three-time All-American, winning one tournament during college career. He graduated in 1989.

== Professional career ==
In 1990, turned professional the following year. Peterson played on the Nationwide Tour in 1992, 1994–2001, and 2003–04, winning once at the 1995 Nike Central Georgia Open. He played on the PGA Tour in 2002 where his best finish was T-10 at the 2002 Valero Texas Open.

Peterson later became the head professional at the University of Georgia Golf Course in Athens, Georgia.

== Amateur wins ==
- 1987 Carolinas Amateur
- 1988 Carolinas Amateur

== Professional wins (5) ==
=== Nike Tour wins (1) ===
No.	Date	Tournament	Winning score	Margin of victory	Runner-up
1	May 14, 1995	Nike Central Georgia Open	−20 (72-66-65-65=268)	2 strokes	(United States) Jeff Barlow

=== U.S. Golf Tour wins (2) ===
No.	Date	Tournament	Winning score	Margin of victory	Runner(s)-up
1	Mar 18, 1990	Mobile Classic	−6 (136)	Playoff	(United States) Steve Ford
2	Jul 15, 1990	Hot Springs Classic	−15 (69-67-66-71=273)	3 strokes	(United States) Kel Devlin, (United States) Glen Day

=== Other wins (2) ===
- 1993 Georgia Open
- 2007 Georgia PGA Championship

== See also ==
- 2001 Buy.com Tour graduates
