= Nelson Whitney =

American amateur golfer (1887–1948)

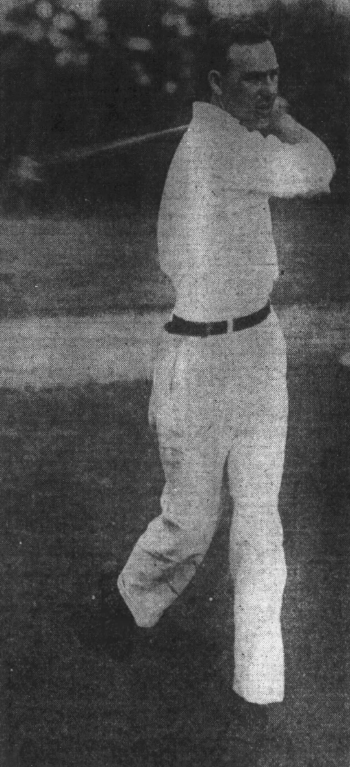

Nelson McStea Whitney (February 4, 1887 – February 27, 1948) was an American amateur golfer. He won the Southern Amateur a record five times.

== Early life ==
Whitney was born on February 4, 1887. He grew up playing golf. His father, George Q. Whitney, was the founder of Whitney National Bank in New Orleans, Louisiana.

== Career ==
In 1909, Whitney was ranked the No. 1 golfer in the South by the Southern Golf Association. He won the Southern Amateur in 1907 in Atlanta, Georgia, in 1908 in Memphis, Tennessee, in 1913 in Montgomery, Alabama, in 1914 in Memphis again, and in 1919 in New Orleans. He was a three-time runner-up as well. He won the Trans-Mississippi Amateur in 1919.

In 1916, Whitney won a national amateur invitational tournament at the National Golf Links of America. The New York Times stated that it was the "finest and largest field of golfers ever entered in a club invitation tournament". The Greater New Orleans Sports Hall of Fame notes that his "greatest individual feat was likely defeating the legendary Bobby Jones head-to-head" in the semifinals of the 1919 Southern Championships.

Whitney finished in 40th place at the 1921 U.S. Open.

== Later life and legacy ==
In 1928, Whitney became vice president of the Whitney National Bank, serving in that role for the remainder of his life. On February 27, 1948, he died of a heart attack at his home in New Orleans.

Whitney was inducted into the Southern Golf Association Hall of Fame in 1974 and the Greater New Orleans Sports Hall of Fame in 1981.
