= Sunset Country Club =

Country club in Missouri, U.S.

- Location within the United States Location within Missouri
- 38.532°N 90.393°W

Club information
- Location: Sunset Hills, Missouri
- Established: 1910
- Type: Private
- Tota holes: 18
- Tournaments: 1946 Western Open; 1956 Carling Open
- Website: sunsetcountryclub.org
- Designed by: Robert and James Foulis
- Par: 72
- Length: 6,686 yards (6,110 m)
- Course rating: 72.6
- Slope rating: 133

Sunset Country Club is a country club in Sunset Hills, Missouri, in south St. Louis County, Missouri.

The par-72 18-hole golf course designed by Robert and James Foulis was built in 1917. A master plan created by Dr. Michael Hurdzan has guided recent course renovations.

== Tournaments hosted ==
Year	Event	Winner	Total	To par	Margin of victory	Runner(s)-up
1941	Trans-Mississippi Amateur	(United States) Frank Stranahan			6 & 5	(United States) John Barnum
1946	Western Open	(United States) Ben Hogan	271	−17	4 strokes	(United States) Lloyd Mangrum
1956	Carling Open	(United States) Dow Finsterwald	274	−14	3 strokes	(United States) Jack Burke Jr. (United States) Billy Casper (United States) Billy Maxwell

== Scorecard ==
Sunset Country Club
Tee	Rating/Slope	1	2	3	4	5	6	7	8	9	Out	10	11	12	13	14	15	16	17	18	In	Total
Gold	72.4 / 132	547	376	287	169	442	403	513	520	360	3617	495	400	450	157	335	222	337	215	400	3011	6628
Blue	70.5 / 127	503	345	268	150	434	368	500	502	305	3375	483	385	413	129	320	193	325	195	390	2833	6208
Red	68.6 / 121	470	297	260	136	322	350	481	475	284	3075	475	359	396	118	307	173	314	185	381	2708	5783
SI	Men's	13	3	15	17	1	7	5	9	11		16	4	2	18	14	10	12	6	8
Par		5	4	4	3	4	4	5	5	4	38	5	4	4	3	4	3	4	3	4	34	72
SI	Ladies'	9	7	15	17	5	13	1	3	11		4	8	2	14	12	18	10	16	6
Yellow	74.6 / 129	448	288	252	130	308	331	440	451	270	2918	470	346	377	105	292	158	297	139	350	2534	5452
White	69.1 / 123	408	252	250	130	294	308	399	405	211	2657	410	295	320	90	280	121	261	139	295	2211	4868
