= Louisiana State Open =

Golf tournament

The Louisiana State Open was the state open golf tournament in the U.S. state of Louisiana, open to both amateur and professional golfers.

== History ==
The inaugural event was held in 1937 and won by Gray Little. The event was not held in the mid-1940s due to World War II. The tournament re-started in November of 1946. The tournament and was held at Louisiana State University's golf course in Baton Rouge, Louisiana. The eligibility requirements were reported as: "Professionals and amateurs who have been residents of the state 60 days prior to the tourney are eligible. Also all military personnel and students at Louisiana schools are eligible." In the mid-1950s, the state open and the state's professional golf organization championships started to be played concurrently.

In 1963, Homero Blancas, then a private in the military, won the tournament. He was one of the first amateurs to win the event. Blancas was one of the most notable champions and would go on to a lengthy career on the PGA Tour. In 1969, the 29th event was held at Acadin Hills Country Club.

== Winners ==
Year	Champion	Ref.
1937	Gray Little	
1938	Jimmy Cole	
1939	Ray Hill	
1940	Jim McGonigall	
1941	Henry Castillo	
1942	Gray Little	
1943–1945: No tournament due to World War II
1946	Henry Castillo	
1947	Frank Champ	
1948	Honald Millet	
1949	Gray Little	
1950	Johnny Myers	
1951	Tommy Morrow (a)	
1952	Gray Little	
1953	Frank Champ	
1954	Frank Champ	
1955	Ned White	
1956	Frank Champ	
1957	Frank Champ	
1958	Jerry Stolhand	
1959	Fred Haas	
1960	Jackey Doss	
1961	Billy Capps	
1962	Billy Capps	
1963	Homero Blancas (a)	
1964	DeWitt Weaver	
1965	Tommy Morrow	
1966	Richard Parvino	
1967	Jerry Lee Comeaux	
1968	Tommy Morrow	
1969	Bill Daigle (a)	
1970	Richard Ellis	
1971	Richard Gaille	
1972	Robert Flagler	
1973	Dick Chassee	
1974	Bob Davis (a)	

== See also ==
- Chitimacha Louisiana Open (Korn Ferry Tour event)
