= Paul Harney =

American professional golfer

Personal information
- Nationality: United States
- Born: July 11, 1929 Worcester, Massachusetts, U.S.
- Died: August 24, 2011 (aged 82) Falmouth, Massachusetts, U.S.
- Height: 5 ft 11 in (1.80 m)
- Weight: 160 lb (73 kg; 11 st)

Career
- Sport: Golf
- College: College of the Holy Cross
- Status: Professional
- Former tours: PGA Tour; Champions Tour
- Professional wins: 11

Number of wins by tour
- PGA Tour: 6
- Other: 5

Best results in major championships
- Masters Tournament: T5: 1964
- PGA Championship: T7: 1962
- U.S. Open: 4th: 1963
- The Open Championship: DNP

Paul Harney (July 11, 1929 – August 24, 2011) was an American professional golfer and golf course owner. He spent part of his career as a full-time PGA Tour player, but mostly was a club professional, part-time tour player, and owner-operator of his own course.

== Early life ==
Harney was born and raised in Worcester, Massachusetts. He attended the College of the Holy Cross, which is located in his hometown; and was captain of the golf team.

== Professional career ==
Harney played full-time on the PGA Tour from 1955 to 1962; and part-time from 1963 to 1973. During that time, he won six PGA Tour events. His first win came at the 1957 Carling Open; he won his second PGA Tour event just two weeks later at the Labatt Open. In 1963 at the prime of his career, he fulfilled a promise made to his wife, Patricia, that when their oldest child started school, he would only play the tour on a part-time basis. He took his first club pro job at Sunset Oaks in northern California, where he stayed a couple years. He then moved his family across the country to Sutton, Massachusetts, where he took the club pro's job at Pleasant Valley Country Club.

Harney had a great deal of success in major championships, placing in the top-10 six times. His best finish in a major was 4th at the 1963 U.S. Open; however, he also finished in the top-8 four times at The Masters in the 1960s.

As his competitive playing days were winding down, Harney used his prize money to open his own course in East Falmouth, Massachusetts, which he owned until his death. His daughter Erin is the general manager, and son Mike is the head pro.

== Personal life ==
Harney had six children with his wife Patricia. He died in Falmouth, Massachusetts at the age of 82.

== Awards and honors ==
- In 1957, Harney received Golf Digest's Most Improved Golfer award.
- In 1963, he was inducted into the Holy Cross Varsity Club Hall of Fame.
- In 1974, Harney earned "PGA Golf Professional of the Year" honors.
- In 1995, he became the first inductee into the New England Golf Hall of Fame.
- In 2005, Harney was enshrined into the PGA Golf Professional Hall of Fame.

== Professional wins (11) ==
=== PGA Tour wins (6) ===
No.	Date	Tournament	Winning score	Margin of victory	Runner-up
1	Jun 23, 1957	Carling Open Invitational	−9 (70-69-68-68=275)	3 strokes	(United States) Dow Finsterwald
2	Jul 7, 1957	Labatt Open	−10 (69-69-70-70=278)	1 stroke	(United States) George Bayer
3	Mar 15, 1959	Pensacola Open Invitational	−19 (69-65-65-70=269)	3 strokes	(United States) Jay Hebert
4	Jan 6, 1964	Los Angeles Open	−4 (71-72-66-71=280)	1 stroke	(United States) Bobby Nichols
5	Jan 11, 1965	Los Angeles Open (2)	−8 (68-71-68-69=276)	3 strokes	(United States) Dan Sikes
6	Jan 30, 1972	Andy Williams-San Diego Open Invitational	−13 (68-71-66-70=275)	1 stroke	(United States) Hale Irwin

PGA Tour playoff record (0–1)

No.	Year	Tournament	Opponent	Result
1	1963	Thunderbird Classic	(United States) Arnold Palmer	Lost to par on first extra hole

=== Other wins (5) ===
- 1967 Massachusetts Open
- 1968 Massachusetts Open
- 1969 Massachusetts Open
- 1970 Massachusetts Open
- 1977 Massachusetts Open

== Playoff record ==
Senior PGA Tour playoff record (0–1)

No.	Year	Tournament	Opponent	Result
1	1980	PGA Seniors' Championship	(United States) Arnold Palmer	Lost to birdie on first extra hole

== Results in major championships ==
Tournament	1956	1957	1958	1959	1960	1961	1962	1963	1964	1965	1966	1967	1968	1969	1970	1971	1972	1973	1974
Masters Tournament				T25		6	T15	WD	T5	T11	T8	T6	T40				T22	T24	CUT
U.S. Open	CUT		T37	T51	T12	T55	T28	4	T39			T18	T57		T18	T46	T21		
PGA Championship				T14	T18	T11	T7	T23		T33	T15	T55					T40		

Note: Harney never played in The Open Championship.

Top 10
Did not play

WD = withdrew
CUT = missed the half way cut
"T" indicates a tie for a place.

=== Summary ===
Tournament	Wins	2nd	3rd	Top-5	Top-10	Top-25	Events	Cuts made
Masters Tournament	0	0	0	1	4	9	12	10
U.S. Open	0	0	0	1	1	5	13	12
The Open Championship	0	0	0	0	0	0	0	0
PGA Championship	0	0	0	0	1	6	9	9
Totals	0	0	0	2	6	20	34	31

- Most consecutive cuts made – 18 (1963 U.S. Open – 1973 Masters)
- Longest streak of top-10s – 1 (six times)
