= Yantis Independent School District =

School district in Texas

Location
- Yantis, Texas United States

District information
- Type: Public School
- Grades: PK-12
- Superintendent: Dr. James Cowley

Students and staff
- Athletic conference: UIL Class 2A
- District mascot: Owls
- Colors: Blue & White

The Yantis Independent School District is a school district based in Yantis, Texas (USA). The district is located in northwestern Wood County with a small portion extending into neighboring Hopkins County.

In 2009, the school district was rated "academically acceptable" by the Texas Education Agency.

== Schools ==
Yantis ISD operates two schools:

- Yantis High School (Grades 6–12)
- Imogene Glenn Elementary School (Grades PK-5)
