= Hawaii Amateur =

Golf tournament

The Hawaii Amateur Golf Championship is an annual golf tournament held in the U.S. state of Hawaii.

== History ==
In 1928, an amateur golf tournament entitled the Territory of Hawaii Amateur Medal-Play Championship began. The champion of the tournament won the Atherton Cup. According to the Hawaii State Golf Association, "This championship brought together the finest amateur golfers in the territory of Hawaii." This event ran until 1949.

In 1964, the Hawaii Amateur was inaugurated by Arthur "Babe" Carter. It was held at Waialae Country Club through the mid-1980s. In 1987, the tournament moved to Pearl Country Club to accommodate more players. The tournament has been continuously held at Pearl CC except for 1995 when the Hawaii Amateur was held at Kapolei Golf Course.

== Winners ==
Year	Champion	Score	Ref.
2026	Tyler Loree	286 (−2)	
2025	Tyler Loree	288 (E)	
2024	Remington Hirano	281 (−7)	
2023	Niall Shiels Donegan	209 (−7)	
2022	Niall Shiels Donegan	282 (−6)	
2021	Spencer Dunaway	210 (−6)	
2020	Isaiah Kanno	286 (−2)	
2019	Tyler Ota	282 (−5)	
2018	Tyler Ota	277 (−11)	
2017	Jun Ho Won	275 (−13)	
2016	Kyle Suppa	284 (−4)	
2015	Shawn Lu	280 (−8)	
2014	Kyle Suppa	277 (−11)	
2013	John Oda	269 (−19)	
2012	John Oda	283 (−4)	
2011	Lorens Chan	278 (−10)	
2010	TJ Kua	283 (−5)	
2009	Lorens Chan	206 (−10)	
2008	Travis Toyama	289 (+1)	
2007	Chan Kim	279 (+9)	
2006	Toru Nakajima	209 (−6)	
2005	Matt Kodama	289 (+1)	
2004	Matt Kodama	287 (−1)	
2003	Chase Chulakote	282 (−6)	
2002	Joe Phengsavath	286 (−2)	
2001	Randy Shibuya	293 (+5)	
2000	Van Wright	280 (−8)	
1999	Regan Lee	283 (−5)	
1998	Damien Jamila	279 (−9)	
1997	Regan Lee	216 (E)	
1996	Brandan Kop	281 (−7)	
1995	Guy Yamamoto	288 (E)	
1994	Mark Takahama	291 (+3)	
1993	Deron Doi	293 (+5)	
1992	Damien Jamila	292 (+4)	
1991	Damien Jamila	299 (+11)	
1990	Damien Jamila	284 (+4)	
1989	Mitsuo Ono	287 (−1)	
1988	Stan Souza	288 (E)	
1987	Phillip Chun	291 (+3)	
1986	Les Uyehara	290 (+2)	
1985	Tetsuo Sakata	295 (+7)	
1984	Larry Stubblefield	289 (+1)	
1983	Chris Santangelo	275 (−13)	
1982	Brian Sasada	294 (+6)	
1981	Dan Nishimoto	286 (−2)	
1980	Brandan Kop	291 (+3)	
1979	George Yamamoto	296 (+8)	
1978	David Ishii	295 (+7)	
1977	Jim Dodd	291 (+3)	
1976	Allan Yamamoto	292 (+4)	
1975	Keith Kollmeyer	281 (−7)	
1974	Allan Yamamoto	281 (−7)	
1973	Al Souza	281 (−7)	
1972	Larry Stubblefield	288 (E)	
1971	Wendall Kop	292 (+4)	
1970	Allan Yamamoto	219 (+3)	
1969	Wendall Kop	216 (E)	
1968	Jerry Stolhand	213 (−3)	
1967	Hung Soo Ahn	284 (−4)	
1966	Allan Yamamoto	294 (+6)	
1965	Paul Spengler, Jr.	293 (+5)	
1964	Paul Spengler, Jr.	293 (+5)	
