= Georgia PGA Championship =

The Georgia PGA Championship is a golf tournament that is the section championship of the Georgia section of the PGA of America. It has been played annually since 1962 at a variety of courses around the state.

== Winners ==
- 2026 Jin Chung
- 2025 Anthony Cordes
- 2024 Jin Chung
- 2023 Troy Spencer
- 2022 Tim Weinhart
- 2021 Jabir Bilal
- 2020 J.P. Griffin
- 2019 Paul Claxton
- 2018 Paul Claxton
- 2017 Tim Weinhart
- 2016 Tim Weinhart
- 2015 James Mason
- 2014 Hank Smith
- 2013 Craig Stevens
- 2012 Sonny Skinner
- 2011 Stephen Keppler
- 2010 Craig Stevens
- 2009 Sonny Skinner
- 2008 Clark Spratlin
- 2007 Matt Peterson
- 2006 Greg Lee
- 2005 Tim Weinhart
- 2004 Jeff Hull
- 2003 Chan Reeves
- 2002 Chan Reeves
- 2001 Craig Stevens
- 2000 James Mason
- 1999 James Mason
- 1998 Mike Cook
- 1997 James Mason
- 1996 Stephen Keppler
- 1995 Craig Hartle
- 1994 Stephen Keppler
- 1993 Tommy Brannen
- 1992 Danny Elkins
- 1991 Bill Robinson
- 1990 Stephen Keppler
- 1989 Toby Chapin
- 1988 Gregg Wolff
- 1987 Gregg Wolff
- 1986 Craig Hartle
- 1985 Gregg Wolff
- 1984 DeWitt Weaver
- 1983 Richard Crawford
- 1982 Richard Crawford
- 1981 Dan Murphy
- 1980 Alan White
- 1979 DeWitt Weaver
- 1978 DeWitt Weaver
- 1977 Wayne Yates
- 1976 Paul Moran
- 1975 Paul Moran
- 1974 DeWitt Weaver
- 1973 Davis Love Jr.
- 1972 Wayne Yates
- 1971 DeWitt Weaver
- 1970 DeWitt Weaver
- 1969 Emory Lee
- 1968 Davis Love Jr.
- 1967 Jim Ferree
- 1966 DeWitt Weaver
- 1965 Jim Stamps
- 1964 Hugh Royer Jr.
- 1963 Hugh Royer Jr.
- 1962 Dick Cline
