= Richard Crawford (golfer) =

American professional golfer (born 1939)

Personal information
- Nationality: United States
- Born: June 27, 1939 (age 87) El Dorado, Arkansas, U.S.

Career
- Sport: Golf
- College: University of Houston
- Turned professional: 1962
- Former tour: PGA Tour
- Professional wins: 2

Best results in major championships
- Masters Tournament: T29: 1960
- PGA Championship: T20: 1970
- U.S. Open: T22: 1967
- The Open Championship: DNP

Richard Crawford (born June 27, 1939) is an American professional golfer.

Crawford was born in El Dorado, Arkansas and attended the University of Houston. There, he won the individual NCAA Golf Championship twice, in 1959 and 1960. He was inducted into the university's Hall of Honor in 2004.

Crawford turned professional in 1962 and played on the PGA Tour from 1964 to 1976, finishing second three times: 1967 Atlanta Classic, 1969 Heritage Golf Classic, 1970 Greater Milwaukee Open. His best finish in a professional major championship was a tie for 20th in the 1967 PGA Championship.

Crawford became a club professional in Georgia after his PGA Tour career ended. He was inducted into the Arkansas Golf Hall of Fame in 2003 and the Georgia Golf Hall of Fame in 2012.

== Amateur wins ==
this list may be incomplete

- 1959 Southern Amateur, NCAA Championship (individual)
- 1960 NCAA Championship (individual)
- 1961 Arkansas Amateur

== Professional wins ==
this list may be incomplete

- 1982 Georgia PGA Championship
- 1983 Georgia PGA Championship

== U.S. national team appearances ==
Professional

- PGA Cup: 1982 (winners)
