= Stephen Keppler =

English-American golfer

Personal information
- Full name: Stephen Derek Keppler
- Nationality: England; United States
- Born: February 18, 1961 (age 65) London, England
- Height: 6 ft 0 in (1.83 m)
- Weight: 170 lb (77 kg; 12 st)
- Spouse: Karen Terry
- Children: Jordan Terry Keppler and Jonathan Terry Keppler

Career
- Sport: Golf
- College: Florida State University
- Turned professional: 1984
- Professional wins: 6

Best results in major championships
- Masters Tournament: DNP
- PGA Championship: CUT: 1995, 1998, 1999, 2001
- U.S. Open: DNP
- The Open Championship: CUT: 1981

Stephen Derek Keppler (born February 18, 1961) is an English-American professional golfer.

Keppler was born in London, England. He played college golf at Florida State University from 1980 to 1983, where he was a third-team All-American. Following his senior season, Keppler for Great Britain and Ireland in the 1983 Walker Cup.

He played on the European Tour in 1984 with little success, making only three cuts in 13 events. He later became a club professional at several clubs in Georgia. A four-time winner of the Georgia PGA Championship and two-time winner of the Georgia Open, Keppler had his PGA Tour highlight when he led the 1995 BellSouth Classic after three rounds, only to finish third.

As a senior, Keppler has qualified twice for the U.S. Senior Open.

In 2014, Keppler was inducted into the Georgia Golf Hall of Fame.

== Professional wins ==
- 1990 Georgia PGA Championship
- 1994 Georgia Open, Georgia PGA Championship
- 1995 Georgia Open
- 1996 Georgia PGA Championship
- 2011 Georgia PGA Championship

== Team appearances ==
Amateur

- Jacques Léglise Trophy (representing Great Britain & Ireland): 1977, 1978
- St Andrews Trophy (representing Great Britain & Ireland): 1982
- Walker Cup (representing Great Britain & Ireland): 1983
- European Amateur Team Championship (representing England): 1983
