= Southern Amateur =

Amateur golf tournament

The Southern Amateur is an amateur golf tournament. It has been played since 1902 and is organized by the Southern Golf Association. From 1902 to 1963, it was played at match play. Since 1964, it has been played at stroke play. Nelson Whitney won the tournament a record five times.

In December 2021, the Southern Amateur joined with six other tournaments to form the Elite Amateur Golf Series.

== Winners ==
- 2026 William Love
- 2025 John Daly II
- 2024 Ding Wenyi
- 2023 Nick Gabrelcik
- 2022 David Ford
- 2021 Maxwell Moldovan
- 2020 Mac Meissner
- 2019 A. J. Ott
- 2018 Patrick Cover
- 2017 Karl Vilips
- 2016 Jimmy Stanger
- 2015 Taylor Funk
- 2014 M. J. Maguire
- 2013 Zachary Olsen
- 2012 Peter Williamson
- 2011 Harris English
- 2010 Alex Carpenter
- 2009 Gregor Main
- 2008 Kyle Stanley
- 2007 Webb Simpson
- 2006 Kyle Stanley
- 2005 Webb Simpson
- 2004 Michael Sim
- 2003 Casey Wittenberg
- 2002 Lee Williams
- 2001 Cody Freeman
- 2000 Ryan Hybl
- 1999 Edward Loar
- 1998 Kris Maffet
- 1997 Ed Brooks
- 1996 Rob Manor
- 1995 Lee Eagleton
- 1994 Trey Sones
- 1993 Justin Leonard
- 1992 Justin Leonard
- 1991 Bill Brown
- 1990 Jason Widener
- 1989 Jason Widener
- 1988 Joe Hamorski
- 1987 Rob McNamara
- 1986 Rob McNamara
- 1985 Len Mattiace
- 1984 Scott Dunlap
- 1983 Pat Stephens
- 1982 Steve Lowery
- 1981 Mark Brooks
- 1980 Bob Tway
- 1979 Rafael Alarcón
- 1978 Jim Woodward
- 1977 Lindy Miller
- 1976 Tim Simpson
- 1975 Vinny Giles
- 1974 Danny Yates
- 1973 Ben Crenshaw
- 1972 Bill Rogers
- 1971 Ben Crenshaw
- 1970 Lanny Wadkins
- 1969 Hubert Green
- 1968 Lanny Wadkins
- 1967 Vinny Giles
- 1966 Hubert Green
- 1965 Billy Joe Patton
- 1964 Dale Morey
- 1963 Mike Malarkey
- 1962 Bunky Henry
- 1961 Billy Joe Patton
- 1960 Charlie Smith
- 1959 Richard Crawford
- 1958 Hugh Royer Jr.
- 1957 Ed Brantly
- 1956 Arnold Blum
- 1955 Charlie Harrison
- 1954 Joe Conrad
- 1953 Joe Conrad
- 1952 Gay Brewer
- 1951 Arnold Blum
- 1950 Dale Morey
- 1949 Tommy Barnes
- 1948 Gene Dahlbender
- 1947 Tommy Barnes
- 1946 George Hamer
- 1942–45 No tournament
- 1941 Sam Perry
- 1940 Neil White
- 1939 Bobby Dunkelberger
- 1938 Carl Dann, Jr.
- 1937 Fred Haas
- 1936 Jack Munger
- 1935 Bobby Riegel
- 1934 Fred Haas
- 1933 Ralph Redmond
- 1932 Sam Perry
- 1931 Chasteen Harris
- 1930 R. E. Spicer, Jr.
- 1929 Sam Perry
- 1928 Watts Gunn
- 1927 Harry Ehle
- 1926 R. E. Spicer, Jr.
- 1925 Glenn Crisman
- 1924 Jack Wenzler
- 1923 Perry Adair
- 1922 Bobby Jones
- 1921 Perry Adair
- 1920 Bobby Jones
- 1919 Nelson Whitney
- 1918 No tournament
- 1917 Bobby Jones
- 1916 R. G. Bush
- 1915 C. L. Dexter
- 1914 Nelson Whitney
- 1913 Nelson Whitney
- 1912 W. P. Stewart
- 1911 W. P. Stewart
- 1910 F. G. Byrd
- 1909 J. P. Edrington
- 1908 Nelson Whitney
- 1907 Nelson Whitney
- 1906 Leigh Carroll
- 1905 Andrew Manson
- 1904 Andrew Manson
- 1903 A. W. Gaines
- 1902 A. F. Schwartz
