= Jacky Cupit =

American professional golfer (1938–2026)

Personal information
- Full name: Jacky Douglas Cupit
- Nationality: United States
- Born: February 1, 1938 Longview, Texas, U.S.
- Died: March 4, 2026 (aged 88) Carrollton, Texas, U.S.
- Height: 5 ft 10 in (1.78 m)
- Weight: 180 lb (82 kg; 13 st)

Career
- Sport: Golf
- College: University of Houston
- Turned professional: 1960
- Former tours: PGA Tour; Champions Tour
- Professional wins: 4

Number of wins by tour
- PGA Tour: 4

Best results in major championships
- Masters Tournament: 15th: 1967
- PGA Championship: T6: 1966
- U.S. Open: 2nd: 1963
- The Open Championship: DNP

Jacky Douglas Cupit (February 1, 1938 – March 4, 2026) was an American professional golfer who played on both the PGA Tour and the Senior PGA Tour.

== Early life and amateur career ==
Cupit was born and raised in Longview, Texas. His older brother, Buster, was a professional golfer who played mainly in Texas and Oklahoma.

He attended the University of Houston. As a member of the Cougars golf team, he earned All-American honors in 1959 and 1960.

== Professional career ==
In 1960, Cupit turned pro. He joined the PGA Tour the following year.

Cupit played on the PGA Tour from 1961 to 1973 and had four victories. His first came at the 1961 Canadian Open helping him to win the PGA's Rookie of the Year award. His last tour win came in 1966 at the Cajun Classic. Cupit's best finish in a major was runner-up at the U.S. Open in 1963, when he and Arnold Palmer lost to Julius Boros in a three-way playoff.

After reaching the age of 50 in 1988, Cupit played part-time on the Senior PGA Tour. He was the Golf Professional Emeritus at the Links at Land's End in Yantis, Texas.

== Death ==
Cupit died on March 4, 2026, at the age of 88.

== Awards and honors ==
In 1961, Cupit earned the PGA's Rookie of the Year award.

== Professional wins (4) ==
=== PGA Tour wins (4) ===
No.	Date	Tournament	Winning score	To par	Margin of victory	Runner(s)-up
1	Jul 15, 1961	Canadian Open	66-69-64-71=270	−10	5 strokes	(United States) Buster Cupit, (United States) Dow Finsterwald, (United States) Bobby Nichols
2	Jul 1, 1962	Western Open	69-70-71-71=281	−3	2 strokes	(United States) Billy Casper
3	Feb 16, 1964	Tucson Open Invitational	69-68-66-71=274	−14	2 strokes	(United States) Rex Baxter
4	Nov 27, 1966	Cajun Classic Open Invitational	68-66-65-72=271	−17	Playoff	(United States) Chi-Chi Rodríguez

PGA Tour playoff record (1–2)

No.	Year	Tournament	Opponent(s)	Result
1	1961	Greater Seattle Open Invitational	(United States) Dave Marr, (United States) Bob Rosburg	Marr won with birdie on first extra hole
2	1963	U.S. Open	(United States) Julius Boros, (United States) Arnold Palmer	Boros won 18-hole playoff; Boros: −1 (70), Cupit: +2 (73), Palmer: +5 (76)
3	1966	Cajun Classic Open Invitational	(United States) Chi-Chi Rodríguez	Won with par on second extra hole

== Results in major championships ==
Tournament	1961	1962	1963	1964	1965	1966	1967	1968	1969	1970	1971
Masters Tournament		T20	WD	T40		T44	15	CUT			
U.S. Open	T9	T17	2	T28	CUT	CUT			CUT		
PGA Championship		CUT		T17	T8	T6	WD		T57	T41	T57

Note: Cupit never played in The Open Championship.

Top 10
Did not play

CUT = missed the half-way cut (3rd round cut in 1962 PGA Championship)
WD = withdrew
"T" indicates a tie for a place

=== Summary ===
Tournament	Wins	2nd	3rd	Top-5	Top-10	Top-25	Events	Cuts made
Masters Tournament	0	0	0	0	0	2	6	4
U.S. Open	0	1	0	1	2	3	7	4
The Open Championship	0	0	0	0	0	0	0	0
PGA Championship	0	0	0	0	2	3	8	6
Totals	0	1	0	1	4	8	21	14

- Most consecutive cuts made – 4 (1963 U.S. Open – 1964 PGA)
- Longest streak of top-10s – 1 (four times)
