= Yantis, Texas =

- Town
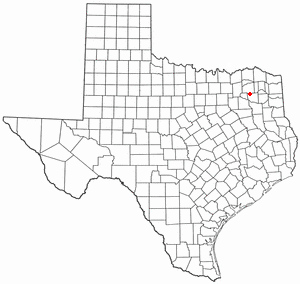
- Location of Yantis, Texas

- Coordinates: 32°55′50″N 95°34′34″W
- Country: United States
- State: Texas
- County: Wood

Area
  - Total: 1.86 sq mi (4.83 km^{2})
  - Land: 1.84 sq mi (4.77 km^{2})
  - Water: 0.023 sq mi (0.06 km^{2})
- Elevation: 482 ft (147 m)

Population (2020)
  - Total: 405
  - Density: 220/sq mi (84.9/km^{2})
- Time zone: UTC-6 (Central (CST))
  - Summer (DST): UTC-5 (CDT)
- ZIP code: 75497
- Area codes: 430, 903
- FIPS code: 48-80440
- GNIS feature ID: 2413519
- Website: cityofyantis.com

Yantis is a town in Wood County, Texas, United States. The population was 405 at the 2020 census. The town is surrounded on three sides by Lake Fork Reservoir. It is located at the intersection of State Highway 154 and Farm to Market Road 17 approximately 12 miles north of the county seat of Quitman in northwestern Wood County.

== History ==
The area that became Yantis was reportedly settled initially by Harry M. Matthews as early as 1860. By 1870, a gristmill and cotton gin in the area were being operated by J. Singleton. The community was served by the Quitman post office until 1885 when it received its own post office. the town was named for its first postmaster, George R. Yantis. George Yantis also ran a gristmill and gin in the community around 1890.

By 1896, the area had its own justice, bailiff, sheriff, two churches, and five schools. By 1914, the town had a phone connection and 21 businesses including Yantis State Bank. Population peaked in the 1930s at 500. The discovery of the Yantis Oilfield in 1947 did not have a lasting impact on the community. Yantis incorporated as a municipality in the late 1960s.

== Geography ==
According to the United States Census Bureau, the town has a total area of 1.9 square miles (4.8 km^{2}), all land.

== Demographics ==
Historical population
Census	Pop.	Note	%±
1970	223		—
1980	210		−5.8%
1990	210		0.0%
2000	321		52.9%
2010	388		20.9%
2020	405		4.4%
U.S. Decennial Census; 2020 Census

As of the census of 2000, there were 321 people, 144 households, and 84 families residing in the town. The population density was 171.9 inhabitants per square mile (66.4/km^{2}). There were 165 housing units at an average density of 88.3 per square mile (34.1/km^{2}). The racial makeup of the town was 95.33% White, 0.31% Native American, 1.56% from other races, and 2.80% from two or more races. Hispanic or Latino of any race were 9.03% of the population.

There were 144 households, out of which 27.8% had children under the age of 18 living with them, 50.0% were married couples living together, 6.9% had a female householder with no husband present, and 41.0% were non-families. 35.4% of all households were made up of individuals, and 27.1% had someone living alone who was 65 years of age or older. The average household size was 2.23 and the average family size was 2.96.

In the town, the population was spread out, with 23.7% under the age of 18, 10.3% from 18 to 24, 23.4% from 25 to 44, 20.9% from 45 to 64, and 21.8% who were 65 years of age or older. The median age was 40 years. For every 100 females, there were 78.3 males. For every 100 females age 18 and over, there were 72.5 males.

The median income for a household in the town was $28,214, and the median income for a family was $36,875. Males had a median income of $30,000 versus $17,639 for females. The per capita income for the town was $13,496. About 16.1% of families and 19.8% of the population were below the poverty line, including 31.0% of those under age 18 and 33.9% of those age 65 or over.

== Education ==
The town of Yantis is served by the Yantis Independent School District and is home to the Yantis High School Owls.
