= Hugh Royer Jr. =

American professional golfer (1936–2014)

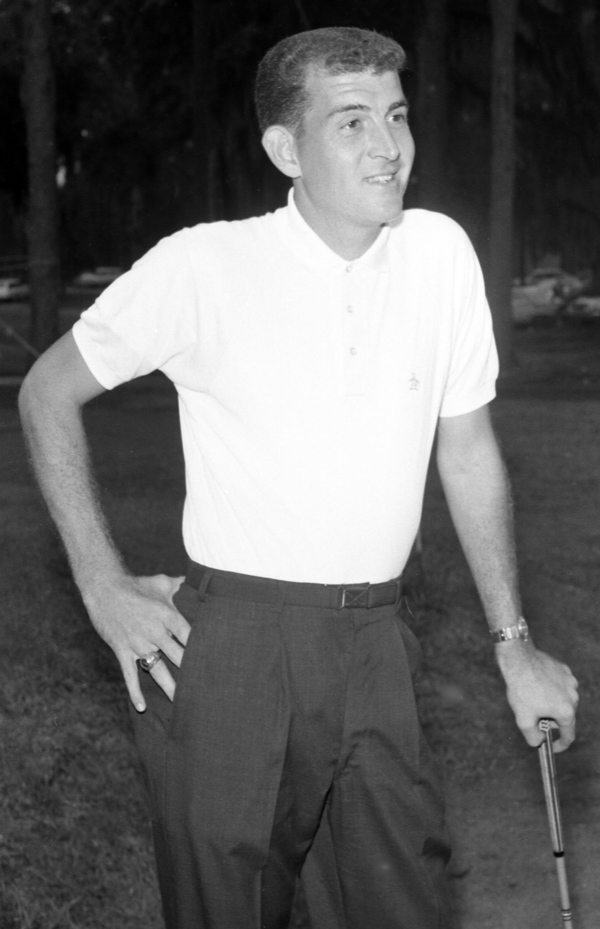
- Royer in 1964

Personal information
- Full name: William Hugh Royer Jr.
- Nationality: United States
- Born: August 19, 1936 Eastman, Georgia, U.S.
- Died: September 12, 2014 (aged 78) Columbus, Georgia, U.S.
- Height: 6 ft 3 in (1.91 m)
- Weight: 197 lb (89 kg; 14.1 st)

Career
- Sport: Golf
- College: University of Georgia
- Turned professional: 1959
- Former tour: PGA Tour
- Professional wins: 7

Number of wins by tour
- PGA Tour: 1
- Other: 6

Best results in major championships
- Masters Tournament: DNP
- PGA Championship: T48: 1970
- U.S. Open: T22: 1968
- The Open Championship: DNP

William Hugh Royer Jr. (August 19, 1936 – September 12, 2014) was an American professional golfer who played on the PGA Tour in the 1950s, 1960s, and 1970s.

== Early life and amateur career ==
Royer was born in Eastman, Georgia. During his youth, his family moved to Columbus, Georgia, where he learned the game of golf from Fred Haskins and Charlie Harper at the Columbus Country Club.

He attended the University of Georgia in Athens where his love for the sport of golf was further nurtured by the legendary coach Howell Hollis. While a student at Georgia, Royer was a standout basketball player and captain of the golf team. He graduated with a Bachelor of Science in Education (B.S.Ed.) degree in 1959.

In 1958, he won the Georgia Amateur and the Southern Amateur.

== Professional career ==
In 1959, Royer turned professional. He won the St. Charles Open in his first pro event. Royer won one PGA Tour event, the biggest win of his career, at the 1970 Western Open, then considered to be one of the most prestigious non-major tournaments in men's professional golf. His best finish in a major was T-22 at the 1968 U.S. Open. He spent 14 years playing on the PGA Tour.

Like most professional golfers of his generation, Royer earned his living primarily as a club pro as very few could afford the Tour full-time. He was head pro at Callaway Gardens from 1960 to 1966. Later, he was head pro at Bull Creek Golf Club in Columbus. Royer served as president of the Georgia PGA and was honored as Georgia Golf Professional of the Year in 1983. He was inducted into the Georgia Golf Hall of Fame in January 1989.

Royer also coached golf at Columbus State University. During his tenure as Associate Coach, the Cougars of Columbus State won five NCAA Division II titles.

== Personal life ==
Royer lived in Columbus, Georgia. His son, Hugh Royer III, is a professional golfer with multiple wins on the Nike Tour.

== Awards and honors ==
- In 1983, Royer honored as Georgia Golf Professional of the Year.
- In January 1989, Royer was inducted into the Georgia Golf Hall of Fame.

== Amateur wins ==
- 1958 Georgia State Amateur, Southern Amateur

== Professional wins (7) ==
=== PGA Tour wins (1) ===
| No. | Date | Tournament | Winning score | Margin of victory | Runner-up |
|---|---|---|---|---|---|
| 1 | Jun 14, 1970 | Western Open | −11 (67-65-72-69=273) | 1 stroke | (United States) Dale Douglass |

=== Other wins (6) ===
- 1959 St. Charles Open
- 1963 Georgia PGA Championship
- 1964 Georgia PGA Championship
- 1968 Georgia Open
- 1983 Atlanta Open
- 1989 Georgia Senior Open
