= John Daly II =

American professional golfer (born 2003)

Personal information
- Full name: John Patrick Daly II
- Nickname: Little John
- Nationality: United States
- Born: July 23, 2003 (age 23) Clearwater, Florida, U.S.
- Height: 5 ft 9 in (175 cm)

Career
- Sport: Golf
- College: University of Arkansas
- Turned professional: 2026
- Professional wins: 1

John Patrick Daly II (born July 23, 2003) is an American professional golfer. He played collegiate golf for the Arkansas Razorbacks at the University of Arkansas. He is the son of two-time major champion John Daly. Daly has gained prominence through his amateur and collegiate career and through appearances in professional events and the PNC Championship, which he won with his father in 2021.

== Early life and education ==
Daly was born in Clearwater, Florida. He is the son of professional golfer John Daly and Sherrie Miller. Growing up around golf, Daly began playing competitively as a junior and later attended Montverde Academy and Bishop's Gate Golf Academy in Florida.

During his junior career, Daly achieved several strong finishes in tournaments organized by the American Junior Golf Association and was named a 2021 second-team Rolex Junior All-American.

Daly attended the University of Arkansas 2021-26, the same school his father attended, and joined the Arkansas Razorbacks men's golf team. While competing for Arkansas, he posted multiple top finishes and recorded a collegiate victory at the Columbia Spring Invitational.

== Amateur career ==
Daly has participated in several major amateur tournaments, including the U.S. Amateur. He qualified for the championship in 2024 after surviving a playoff in the final qualifying stage. In 2025, he won the Southern Amateur and reached the quarterfinals of the U.S. Amateur.

Daly partnered with his father in the PNC Father-Son Challenge, a tournament featuring major champions and family members, nine times as an amateur. The pair won the event in 2021 ahead of Tiger Woods and son with a record 27-under-par score, and have finished runner-up in 2018 and 2022.

He also competed in a Korn Ferry Tour event, the Compliance Solutions Championship, as an amateur in 2024.

== Professional career ==
Before turning professional in 2026, Daly appeared in professional tournaments through sponsor exemptions. In March, he made his PGA Tour debut at the Puerto Rico Open, shooting a 5-under-par 67 in the second round to make the cut.

Daly made his professional debut at the OccuNet Classic on the Korn Ferry Tour, where he made the cut. He made his European Tour debut at the Nexo Championship at Trump International Golf Links Scotland.

== Personal life ==
Daly has several half-siblings and grew up in a golfing family environment. He reached NIL deals with brands including Hooters, TaylorMade, and Loudmouth Golf while competing as an amateur.

== Amateur wins ==
- 2020 Fall Kickoff, Bishops Gate Shootout, Bishops Gate Open
- 2021 Sung Hyun Park Junior Championship, IJGT Elite Series #5
- 2025 Southern Amateur, Blessings Collegiate Invitational

== Professional wins ==
=== Other wins (1) ===
No.	Date	Tournament	Winning score	Margin of victory	Runner(s)-up
1	Dec 19, 2021	PNC Championship (with father John Daly)	−27 (60-57=117)	2 strokes	(United States) Tiger Woods and son Charlie Woods
