= Davis Love Jr. =

American professional golfer (1935–1988)

Personal information
- Full name: Davis Milton Love Jr.
- Nationality: United States
- Born: September 19, 1935
- Died: November 14, 1988 (aged 53)
- Spouse: Penta Burgin Love
- Children: 2, including Davis III

Career
- Sport: Golf
- College: University of Texas
- Status: Professional
- Professional wins: 4

Best results in major championships
- Masters Tournament: T34: 1964
- PGA Championship: T55: 1967
- U.S. Open: T14: 1963
- The Open Championship: T6: 1969

Davis Milton Love Jr. (September 19, 1935 – November 14, 1988) was an American professional golfer. He finished tied for sixth place in the 1969 Open Championship and was the father of tour pro Davis Love III.

Love played college golf at the University of Texas in Austin under head coach Harvey Penick and spent most of his professional career as a golf pro and teaching professional.

Love was among four killed in a private plane crash while approaching Jacksonville International Airport through fog. He was inducted into the Georgia Golf Hall of Fame in 1991.

== Professional wins ==
this list may be incomplete

- 1962 Carolinas PGA Championship
- 1964 Carolinas Open
- 1968 Georgia PGA Championship
- 1973 Georgia PGA Championship

== Results in major championships ==
Tournament	1955	1956	1957	1958	1959
Masters Tournament	68				
U.S. Open					
The Open Championship					
PGA Championship					

Tournament	1960	1961	1962	1963	1964	1965	1966	1967	1968	1969
Masters Tournament					T34					
U.S. Open	CUT			T14	43				CUT	
The Open Championship										T6
PGA Championship			CUT					T55		T63

Tournament	1970	1971	1972	1973	1974
Masters Tournament					
U.S. Open	72	CUT			CUT
The Open Championship	55				
PGA Championship				CUT	CUT

Top 10
Did not play

CUT = missed the half-way cut
"T" indicates a tie for a place
