= 1968 PGA Championship =

Coordinates: 29.377°N 98.431°W

Tournament information
- Dates: July 18–21, 1968
- Location: San Antonio, Texas
- Course: Pecan Valley Golf Club
- Organized by: PGA of America
- Tour: PGA Tour

Statistics
- Par: 70
- Length: 7,096 yards (6,489 m)
- Field: 165 players, 75 after cut
- Cut: 149 (+9)
- Prize fund: $150,000
- Winner's share: $25,000

Champion
- (United States) Julius Boros
- 281 (+1)

Location in the United States
Location in Texas

The 1968 PGA Championship was the 50th PGA Championship played July 18–21 at Pecan Valley Golf Club in San Antonio, Texas. Julius Boros, age 48, won the third of his three major titles, one stroke ahead of runners-up Bob Charles and Arnold Palmer. Boros was the oldest winner of a major championship for over a half century, until Phil Mickelson won in the PGA Championship in 2021 at age fifty. The tournament was played in very hot conditions. Palmer had an 8-foot (2.4 m) putt to tie on the 72nd green, but it missed on the high side of the hole. It was the second of his three runner-up finishes at the only major he never won; he also tied for second in 1964 and 1970.

This was the final major before the formation of the Tournament Players Division, later renamed the PGA Tour. The tour pros broke away from the PGA of America in August and formed an independent tour, the American Professional Golfers, Inc. (APG). A compromise was reached in December which brought the tournament players back to the PGA in a separate division with its own policy board and commissioner.

In his seventh PGA Championship, Jack Nicklaus missed his first cut in the event by a stroke; five of his six previous finishes were in the top three, with a victory in 1963 in Dallas. He made the next nine cuts at the PGA Championship and won four more times (1971, 1973, 1975, 1980).

This PGA Championship was played immediately after the Open Championship in Scotland, the fifth time during the 1960s which the final two majors were played in consecutive weeks. This PGA Championship was also the last held in July (until 2016); it moved to August in 1969 (except 1971 when it was played in February in Florida).

== Round summaries ==
=== First round ===
Thursday, July 18, 1968

Place	Player	Score	To par
1	(United States) Marty Fleckman	66	−4
2	(United States) Frank Beard	68	−2
T3	(United States) Don Bies	69	−1
T3	(United States) Mason Rudolph	69	−1
T3	(United States) Lee Trevino	69	−1
T6	(United States) Miller Barber	70	E
T6	(United States) Frank Boynton	70	E
T6	(United States) Charles Coody	70	E
T6	(United States) Al Geiberger	70	E
T6	(United States) Laurie Hammer	70	E
T6	(United States) Johnny Pott	70	E
T6	(United States) Dan Sikes	70	E

=== Second round ===
Friday, July 19, 1968

Place	Player	Score	To par
T1	(United States) Frank Beard	68-70=138	−2
T1	(United States) Marty Fleckman	66-72=138	−2
3	(United States) Doug Sanders	72-67=139	−1
T4	(United States) George Archer	71-69=140	E
T4	(United States) Miller Barber	70-70=140	E
T4	(United States) Arnold Palmer	71-69=140	E
T4	(United States) Johnny Pott	70-70=140	E
T4	(United States) Lee Trevino	69-71=140	E
T9	(United States) Don Bies	69-73=142	+2
T9	(United States) Julius Boros	71-71=142	+2
T9	(New Zealand) Bob Charles	72-70=142	+2
T9	(United States) Dan Sikes	70-72=142	+2

=== Third round ===
Saturday, July 20, 1968

Place	Player	Score	To par
T1	(United States) Frank Beard	68-70-72=210	E
T1	(United States) Marty Fleckman	66-72-72=210	E
T3	(United States) Miller Barber	70-70-72=212	+2
T3	(United States) Julius Boros	71-71-70=212	+2
T3	(New Zealand) Bob Charles	72-70-70=212	+2
T3	(United States) Arnold Palmer	71-69-72=212	+2
T3	(United States) Dick Rhyan	72-72-68=212	+2
T3	(United States) Doug Sanders	72-67-73=212	+2
T3	(United States) Lee Trevino	69-71-72=212	+2
10	(United States) Lou Graham	73-70-70=213	+3

=== Final round ===
Sunday, July 21, 1968

Place	Player	Score	To par	Money ($)
1	(United States) Julius Boros	71-71-70-69=281	+1	25,000
T2	(New Zealand) Bob Charles	72-70-70-70=282	+2	12,500
T2	(United States) Arnold Palmer	71-69-72-70=282	+2	12,500
T4	(United States) George Archer	71-69-74-69=283	+3	7,500
T4	(United States) Marty Fleckman	66-72-72-73=283	+3	7,500
T6	(United States) Frank Beard	68-70-72-74=284	+4	5,750
T6	(United States) Billy Casper	74-70-70-70=284	+4	5,750
T8	(United States) Miller Barber	70-70-72-73=285	+5	3,406
T8	(United States) Frank Boynton	70-73-72-70=285	+5	3,406
T8	(United States) Charles Coody	70-77-70-68=285	+5	3,406
T8	(United States) Al Geiberger	70-73-71-71=285	+5	3,406
T8	(United States) Bob Goalby	73-72-70-70=285	+5	3,406
T8	(United States) Lou Graham	73-70-70-72=285	+5	3,406
T8	(United States) Doug Sanders	72-67-73-73=285	+5	3,406
T8	(United States) Dan Sikes	70-72-73-70=285	+5	3,406
T8	(United States) Kermit Zarley	72-75-68-70=285	+5	3,406
