= Julius Boros =

American professional golfer (1920–1994)

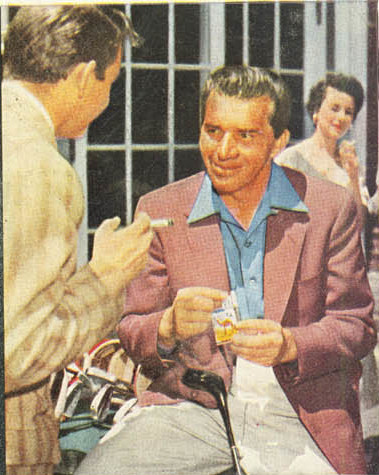
- Boros in a 1949 ad

Personal information
- Full name: Julius Nicholas Boros
- Nickname: Moose
- Nationality: United States
- Born: March 3, 1920 Fairfield, Connecticut, U.S.
- Died: May 28, 1994 (aged 74) Fort Lauderdale, Florida, U.S.
- Height: 6 ft 0 in (183 cm)
- Weight: 215 lb (98 kg; 15.4 st)
- Children: 7, including Guy

Career
- Sport: Golf
- College: Junior College of Connecticut
- Turned professional: 1949
- Former tour: PGA Tour
- Professional wins: 25

Number of wins by tour
- PGA Tour: 18
- Other: 4 (regular); 3 (senior)

Best results in major championships (wins: 3)
- Masters Tournament: T3: 1963
- PGA Championship: Won: 1968
- U.S. Open: Won: 1952, 1963
- The Open Championship: 15th: 1966

Achievements and awards
- World Golf Hall of Fame: 1982 (member page)
- PGA Tour money list winner: 1952, 1955
- PGA Player of the Year: 1952, 1963

Julius Nicholas Boros (March 3, 1920 – May 28, 1994) was an American professional golfer noted for his effortless-looking swing and strong record on difficult golf courses, particularly at the U.S. Open.

== Early life and amateur career ==
Born in Fairfield, Connecticut, Boros was of Hungarian descent, and played varsity baseball in college. He then worked as an accountant while playing high-standard amateur golf.

== Professional career ==
Boros turned professional in 1949 at age 29. He won 18 PGA Tour events, including three major championships: the 1952 and 1963 U.S. Opens and the 1968 PGA Championship. He won his first by four strokes in the heat at the Northwood Club in Dallas, also his first PGA Tour victory, which interrupted the U.S. Open streak of 36-hole leader Ben Hogan for a year. In the windy 1963 U.S. Open near Boston, Boros defeated Arnold Palmer and Jacky Cupit in a playoff, after all had finished the 72 holes at a post-war record nine over par.

For over a half century, Boros was the oldest player to win a modern major, taking the 1968 PGA Championship in San Antonio by a stroke at age 48. One of the runners-up was Palmer, who never won the PGA Championship to complete his career grand slam. The previous oldest winner of a major was Old Tom Morris, age 46 in the 1867 Open Championship. Boros' mark was surpassed by Phil Mickelson, who won the PGA Championship in 2021 at age fifty.

Boros' best results among the majors were at the U.S. Open, with nine top-five finishes; he contended in that championship as late as 1973 at age 53, and tied for seventh.

Boros was a member of the Ryder Cup team in 1959, 1963, 1965, and 1967. He was PGA Player of the Year in 1952 and 1963, and his total career PGA Tour earnings were $1,004,861. Boros was inducted into the World Golf Hall of Fame in 1982.

While other players often walked around a hole and studied the green for several minutes before putting – sometimes from their knees, Boros is remembered for not wasting any time on either the greens or the fairways. He would walk up to the ball and "just do it". Noted for his relaxed, nonchalant-looking swing and manner, he is remembered for his catchphrase "swing easy, hit hard." Boros had an exceptional short game.

Boros was also instrumental in starting the Senior PGA Tour in the late 1970s. The exciting televised playoff victory of Boros and partner Roberto De Vicenzo over Tommy Bolt and Art Wall Jr. at the Legends of Golf tournament in 1979 raised the profile of professional senior golf competition.

== Personal life ==
Boros' first wife, Buttons Cosgrove, died in childbirth in 1951. Boros and his second wife, Armen, had seven children: four sons and three daughters. His son Guy Boros won on the PGA Tour in 1996, at the Greater Vancouver Open in late August.

Boros suffered a fatal heart attack in 1994 on the golf course at the Coral Ridge Country Club in Fort Lauderdale, Florida. He was found sitting in a golf cart under a willow tree by two club members near the 16th hole, his favorite spot on the course.

== Professional wins (25) ==
=== PGA Tour wins (18) ===
Legend
Major championships (3)
Other PGA Tour (15)

No.	Date	Tournament	Winning score	To par	Margin of victory	Runner(s)-up
1	Jun 14, 1952	U.S. Open	71-71-68-71=281	+1	4 strokes	(United States) Ed Oliver
2	Aug 11, 1952	World Championship of Golf	68-71-70-67=276	−12	Playoff	(United States) Cary Middlecoff
3	May 9, 1954	Ardmore Open	68-69-72-70=279	−1	1 stroke	(United States) Jerry Barber
4	Jul 18, 1954	Carling Open	71-70-68-71=280	−8	Playoff	(United States) George Fazio
5	Aug 14, 1955	World Championship of Golf (2)	70-72-69-70=281	−7	2 strokes	(United States) Fred Haas
6	May 11, 1958	Arlington Hotel Open	70-64-68-71=273	−15	1 stroke	(United States) Cary Middlecoff
7	Nov 9, 1958	Carling Open Invitational (2)	74-66-70-74=284	−4	2 strokes	(United States) Billy Casper
8	Sep 14, 1959	Dallas Open Invitational	68-66-70-70=274	−10	1 stroke	(United States) Dow Finsterwald, (United States) Earl Stewart, (United States) Bo Wininger
9	May 15, 1960	Colonial National Invitation	70-71-69-70=280	E	1 stroke	(United States) Gene Littler, (Australia) Kel Nagle
10	May 12, 1963	Colonial National Invitation (2)	71-66-71-71=279	−1	4 strokes	(South Africa) Gary Player
11	Jun 9, 1963	Buick Open Invitational	66-71-68-69=274	−14	5 strokes	(United States) Dow Finsterwald
12	Jun 23, 1963	U.S. Open (2)	71-74-76-72=293	+9	Playoff	(United States) Jacky Cupit, (United States) Arnold Palmer
13	Apr 5, 1964	Greater Greensboro Open	68-70-73-66=277	−7	Playoff	(United States) Doug Sanders
14	Feb 12, 1967	Phoenix Open Invitational	69-67-69-67=272	−12	1 stroke	(United States) Ken Still
15	Mar 12, 1967	Florida Citrus Open Invitational	70-67-67-70=274	−10	1 stroke	(Canada) George Knudson, (United States) Arnold Palmer
16	Jun 11, 1967	Buick Open Invitational (2)	72-72-70-69=283	−5	3 strokes	(United States) Bob Goalby, (United States) R. H. Sikes, (United States) Bert Yancey
17	Jul 21, 1968	PGA Championship	71-71-70-69=281	+1	1 stroke	(New Zealand) Bob Charles, (United States) Arnold Palmer
18	Aug 18, 1968	Westchester Classic	70-65-69-68=272	−16	1 stroke	(United States) Bob Murphy, (United States) Jack Nicklaus, (United States) Dan Sikes

PGA Tour playoff record (4–6)

No.	Year	Tournament	Opponent(s)	Result
1	1952	World Championship of Golf	(United States) Cary Middlecoff	Won 18-hole playoff; Boros: −4 (68), Middlecoff: −2 (70)
2	1954	Miami Beach International Four-Ball (with (United States) Dutch Harrison)	(United States) Tommy Bolt and (United States) Dick Mayer	Lost to birdie on first extra hole
3	1954	Carling Open	(United States) George Fazio	Won with par on first extra hole
4	1958	Dallas Open Invitational	(United States) John McMullin, (South Africa) Gary Player, (United States) Sam Snead	Snead won with birdie on first extra hole
5	1959	Houston Classic	(United States) Jack Burke Jr.	Lost 18-hole playoff; Burke: −8 (64), Boros: −3 (69)
6	1963	U.S. Open	(United States) Jacky Cupit, (United States) Arnold Palmer	Won 18-hole playoff; Boros: −1 (70), Cupit: + 2 (73), Palmer: +5 (76)
7	1963	Western Open	(United States) Jack Nicklaus, (United States) Arnold Palmer	Palmer won 18-hole playoff; Palmer: −1 (70), Boros: E (71), Nicklaus: +2 (73)
8	1964	Greater Greensboro Open	(United States) Doug Sanders	Won with par on first extra hole
9	1969	Greater Greensboro Open	(United States) Gene Littler, (United States) Orville Moody, (United States) Tom Weiskopf	Littler won with birdie on fifth extra hole Weiskopf eliminated by par on first hole
10	1975	Westchester Classic	(United States) Gene Littler	Lost to par on first extra hole

=== Other wins (4) ===
This list may be incomplete

- 1951 Massachusetts Open
- 1956 Carolinas PGA Championship
- 1964 Carolinas PGA Championship
- 1979 South Florida PGA Championship

=== Senior wins (3) ===
- 1971 PGA Seniors' Championship
- 1977 PGA Seniors' Championship
- 1979 Legends of Golf (with Roberto De Vicenzo)

== Major championships ==
=== Wins (3) ===
Year	Championship	54 holes	Winning score	Margin	Runner(s)-up
1952	U.S. Open	2 shot lead	+1 (71-71-68-71=281)	4 strokes	(United States) Ed Oliver
1963	U.S. Open (2)	3 shot deficit	+9 (71-74-76-72=293)	Playoff^{1}	(United States) Jacky Cupit, (United States) Arnold Palmer
1968	PGA Championship	2 shot deficit	+1 (71-71-70-69=281)	1 stroke	(New Zealand) Bob Charles, (United States) Arnold Palmer

^{1}Defeated Jacky Cupit and Arnold Palmer in an 18-hole playoff - Boros 70 (-1), Cupit 73 (+2), Palmer 76 (+5).

=== Results timeline ===
Tournament	1950	1951	1952	1953	1954	1955	1956	1957	1958	1959
Masters Tournament	T35	17	T7	T10	T16	T4	T24	CUT	T39	T8
U.S. Open	9	T4	1	T17	T23	T5	T2	T4	3	T28
The Open Championship										
PGA Championship									T5	T44

Tournament	1960	1961	1962	1963	1964	1965	1966	1967	1968	1969
Masters Tournament	5	CUT	T11	T3	CUT	CUT	T28	5	T16	T33
U.S. Open	T3	CUT		1	CUT	T4	T17	WD	T16	T13
The Open Championship							15			
PGA Championship	T24	CUT	T11	T13	T21	T17	T6	T5	1	T25

Tournament	1970	1971	1972	1973	1974	1975	1976	1977	1978	1979	1980
Masters Tournament	T23	CUT	CUT	CUT	T26						
U.S. Open	T12	T42	T29	T7	WD	T38		CUT			
The Open Championship											
PGA Championship	T26	T34	WD	CUT		T40	CUT	T58	CUT	CUT	CUT

Win
Top 10
Did not play

CUT = missed the half-way cut
WD = withdrew
"T" = tied

=== Summary ===
Tournament	Wins	2nd	3rd	Top-5	Top-10	Top-25	Events	Cuts made
Masters Tournament	0	0	1	4	7	13	25	18
U.S. Open	2	1	2	9	11	17	26	21
The Open Championship	0	0	0	0	0	1	1	1
PGA Championship	1	0	0	3	4	10	22	15
Totals	3	1	3	16	22	41	74	55

- Most consecutive cuts made – 14 (1950 Masters – 1956 U.S. Open)
- Longest streak of top-10s – 4 (1951 U.S. Open – 1953 Masters)

== U.S. national team appearances ==
Professional

- Ryder Cup: 1959 (winners), 1963 (winners), 1965 (winners), 1967 (winners)
- World Cup: 1953, 1968
- Hopkins Trophy: 1952 (winners), 1953 (winners)

== See also ==
- List of golfers with most PGA Tour wins
- List of men's major championships winning golfers
