= Arlington Hotel Open =

Golf tournament formerly on the PGA Tour

Hot Springs Open Invitational
Tournament information
- Location: Hot Springs, Arkansas
- Established: 1955
- Course: Hot Springs Country Club
- Par: 72
- Tour: PGA Tour
- Format: Stroke play
- Prize fund: US$25,000
- Month played: July
- Final year: 1963

Tournament record score
- Aggregate: 270 Bo Wininger (1955); 270 Gene Littler (1959)
- To par: −18 as above

Final champion
- (United States) Dave Hill
- Location in the United States Location in Arkansas

The Arlington Hotel Open was a PGA Tour event that was played from 1955 to 1963 at the Arlington golf course of the Hot Springs Country Club near the Arlington Hotel, now known as the Arlington Resort Hotel and Spa, a 484-room resort in the Ouachita Mountains of Hot Springs National Park in Arkansas. The event was also known as the Hot Springs Open or Hot Springs Open Invitational. The Majestic Golf Course was constructed by Willie Park, Jnr. in 1898. The Arlington Golf Course was designed and built by William Diddle in 1927. Jimmy Demaret won the last of his 31 PGA Tour wins at this event in 1957.

== Winners ==
Year	Winner	Score	To par	Margin of victory	Runner(s)-up
Hot Springs Open Invitational
1963	(United States) Dave Hill	277	−11	Playoff	(United States) Mike Souchak
1962	(Canada) Al Johnston	273	−15	Playoff	(United States) Bill Collins
1961	(United States) Doug Sanders	273	−15	1 stroke	(United States) Dave Ragan (United States) Jerry Steelsmith
1960	(United States) Bill Collins	275	−13	3 strokes	(United States) Pete Cooper
Arlington Hotel Open
1959	(United States) Gene Littler	270	−18	1 stroke	(United States) Jim Ferree
1958	(United States) Julius Boros	273	−15	1 stroke	(United States) Cary Middlecoff
1957	(United States) Jimmy Demaret	276	−12	1 stroke	(United States) Jack Burke Jr. (United States) Lloyd Mangrum (United States) Billy Maxwell (United States) Johnny Palmer (United States) Mike Souchak
1956	(United States) Billy Maxwell	272	−12	1 stroke	(United States) George Bayer (United States) Ernie Vossler
Hot Springs Open
1955	(United States) Bo Wininger	270	−18	5 strokes	(United States) Doug Ford (United States) Cary Middlecoff
