= Upper Montclair Country Club =

Golf course in New Jersey, US

Coordinates: 40.847726°N 74.175075°W

- Location within the United States Location within New Jersey

Club information
- Location: Clifton, New Jersey, U.S.
- Established: 1901, 125 years ago
- Type: Private
- Tota holes: 27
- Tournaments: LPGA Founders Cup; Sybase Classic; NFL Golf Classic; Chrysler-Plymouth Classic; Dow Jones Open Invitational; Thunderbird Classic
- Fairways: Bluegrass / Poa annua
- Website: UpperMontclairCountryClub.com
- Designed by: A. W. Tillinghast, Robert Trent Jones Sr. (Renovation to 27 holes)

Upper Montclair Country Club is an A. W. Tillinghast-designed private golf club located in Clifton, New Jersey, approximately 12 miles (20 km) west of New York City. Upper Montclair is the only golf club in the United States that has hosted professional events from all three U.S. tours (PGA, LPGA and Champions).

== History ==
The original 18-hole golf course and a new clubhouse opened in 1928. In the 1950s, Robert Trent Jones Sr. led a major course renovation, transforming Upper Montclair Country Club into the present 27-hole championship design. In 2000, the club hired Roger Rulewich to complete a course renovation project that included installing state-of-the-art drainage and irrigation system, while reshaping and restoring all of the bunkers throughout the 27-hole facility.

Upper Montclair has appeared in episodes of The Sopranos.

== Notable professional events ==
Year	Tournament	Winner
1962	Thunderbird Classic Invitational	Gene Littler
1966	Thunderbird Classic	Mason Rudolph
1967	Thunderbird Classic	Arnold Palmer
1968	Thunderbird Classic	Bob Murphy
1970	Dow Jones Open Invitational	Bobby Nichols
1979	Coca-Cola Classic	Nancy Lopez
1980	Coca-Cola Classic	Donna White
1983	Chrysler-Plymouth Charity Classic	Pat Bradley
1984	Chrysler-Plymouth Charity Classic	Barb Bunkowsky
1993	Cadillac NFL Golf Classic	Lee Trevino
1994	Cadillac NFL Golf Classic	Raymond Floyd
1995	Cadillac NFL Golf Classic	George Archer
1996	Cadillac NFL Golf Classic	Bob Murphy
1997	Cadillac NFL Golf Classic	Bruce Crampton
1998	Cadillac NFL Golf Classic	Bob Dickson
1999	Cadillac NFL Golf Classic	Allen Doyle
2000	Cadillac NFL Golf Classic	Lee Trevino (2)
2001	NFL Golf Classic	John Schroeder
2002	NFL Golf Classic	James Mason
2007	LPGA Sybase Classic	Lorena Ochoa
2008	LPGA Sybase Classic	Lorena Ochoa (2)
2009	LPGA Sybase Classic	Oh Ji-young
2022	LPGA Cognizant Founders Cup	Minjee Lee
2023	LPGA Cognizant Founders Cup	Ko Jin-young
2024	LPGA Cognizant Founders Cup	Rose Zhang
