= 1962 PGA Championship =

Tournament information
- Dates: July 19–22, 1962
- Location: Newtown Square, Pennsylvania; 40.011°N 75.409°W
- Course: Aronimink Golf Club
- Organized by: PGA of America
- Tour: PGA Tour

Statistics
- Par: 70
- Length: 7,045 yards (6,442 m)
- Field: 170 players, 91 after 1st cut 60 after 2nd cut
- Cut: 151 (+11) (1st cut); 222 (+12) (2nd cut)
- Prize fund: $69,400
- Winner's share: $13,000

Champion
- (South Africa) Gary Player
- 278 (−2)
- Location in the United States Location in Pennsylvania

The 1962 PGA Championship was the 44th PGA Championship, played July 19–22 at Aronimink Golf Club in Newtown Square, Pennsylvania, a suburb west of Philadelphia. Gary Player won the first of his two PGA Championships, one stroke ahead of runner-up Bob Goalby, for the third of his nine major titles and the third leg of his career grand slam.

The Open Championship was played the previous week at Royal Troon Golf Club, Scotland, the first of five times in the 1960s that these two majors were played in consecutive weeks in July. The PGA Championship moved permanently to August in 1969 (except 1971, when it was played in late February), then went to mid-May in 2019.

Player missed the 36-hole cut at Troon, the British Open was won by Arnold Palmer for the second straight year. Palmer had also won the Masters in April. Both the U.S. Open and PGA Championship were played in his home state of Pennsylvania in 1962, just five weeks apart. Palmer lost to 22-year-old Jack Nicklaus in an 18-hole playoff at the U.S. Open at Oakmont near Pittsburgh, then finished ten strokes back in a tie for 17th at Aronimink.

In his first PGA Championship, Nicklaus shot a final round 67 to finish three strokes back, tied for third with George Bayer.

This championship was originally scheduled for Brentwood Country Club in Los Angeles, the first in California since 1929. In November 1960, the PGA of America had voted to retain its "caucasian only" clause, and had gained the ire of California's attorney general Stanley Mosk, who threatened to shut down the PGA in the state until the clause was removed. In response, the championship for 1962 was moved from Los Angeles to Philadelphia. The PGA of America dropped the clause in November 1961 by amending its constitution. The championship returned to California in 1977 at Pebble Beach, but was not played in southern California until 1983 at Riviera Country Club.

== Course layout ==
| Hole | 1 | 2 | 3 | 4 | 5 | 6 | 7 | 8 | 9 | Out | 10 | 11 | 12 | 13 | 14 | 15 | 16 | 17 | 18 | In | Total |
|---|---|---|---|---|---|---|---|---|---|---|---|---|---|---|---|---|---|---|---|---|---|
| Yards | 432 | 383 | 442 | 457 | 162 | 396 | 370 | 233 | 610 | 3,485 | 449 | 411 | 459 | 384 | 211 | 469 | 541 | 213 | 423 | 3,560 | 7,045 |
| Par | 4 | 4 | 4 | 4 | 3 | 4 | 4 | 3 | 5 | 35 | 4 | 4 | 4 | 4 | 3 | 4 | 5 | 3 | 4 | 35 | 70 |

== Round summaries ==
=== First round ===
Thursday, July 19, 1962

Fifty-year-old John Barnum opened with a course record 66; Arnold Palmer and Jack Nicklaus were five strokes back at 71 and Gary Player shot 72.

| Place | Player | Score | To par |
|---|---|---|---|
| 1 | (United States) John Barnum | 66 | −4 |
| 2 | (United States) Chick Harbert | 68 | −2 |
| T3 | (United States) George Bayer | 69 | −1 |
| T3 | (United States) Doug Ford | 69 | −1 |
| T3 | (United States) Bob Goalby | 69 | −1 |
| T3 | (United States) Frank Stranahan | 69 | −1 |
| T7 | (United States) Leo Biagetti | 70 | E |
| T7 | (United States) Joe Campbell | 70 | E |
| T7 | (United States) Paul Harney | 70 | E |
| T7 | (United States) Dick Hart | 70 | E |
| T7 | (United States) Don January | 70 | E |

=== Second round ===
Friday, July 20, 1962

| Place | Player | Score | To par |
|---|---|---|---|
| 1 | (United States) Doug Ford | 69-69=138 | −2 |
| T2 | (United States) George Bayer | 69-70=139 | −1 |
| T2 | (United States) Cary Middlecoff | 73-66=139 | −1 |
| T2 | (South Africa) Gary Player | 72-67=139 | −1 |
| T5 | (United States) John Barnum | 66-74=140 | E |
| T5 | (United States) Bob McCallister | 74-66=140 | E |
| 7 | (United States) Bob Goalby | 69-72=141 | +1 |
| T8 | (United States) Julius Boros | 73-69=142 | +2 |
| T8 | (United States) Jack Burke Jr. | 73-69=142 | +2 |
| T8 | (United States) Marty Furgol | 71-71=142 | +2 |
| T8 | (United States) Bobby Nichols | 72-70=142 | +2 |
| T8 | (United States) Frank Stranahan | 69-73=142 | +2 |

=== Third round ===
Saturday, July 21, 1962

| Place | Player | Score | To par |
|---|---|---|---|
| 1 | (South Africa) Gary Player | 72-67-69=208 | −2 |
| T2 | (United States) George Bayer | 69-70-71=210 | E |
| T2 | (United States) Bob McCallister | 74-66-70=210 | E |
| 4 | (United States) Doug Ford | 69-69-73=211 | +1 |
| 5 | (United States) Bob Goalby | 69-72-71=212 | +2 |
| T6 | (United States) Jack Burke Jr. | 73-69-71=213 | +3 |
| T6 | (United States) Dow Finsterwald | 73-70-70=213 | +3 |
| T6 | (United States) Jack Fleck | 74-69-70=213 | +3 |
| T6 | (United States) Chick Harbert | 68-76-69=213 | +3 |
| T6 | (United States) Cary Middlecoff | 73-66-74=213 | +3 |
| T6 | (United States) Bobby Nichols | 72-70-71=213 | +3 |

=== Final leaderboard ===
Sunday, July 22, 1962

| Place | Player | Score | To par | Money ($) |
|---|---|---|---|---|
| 1 | (South Africa) Gary Player | 72-67-69-70=278 | −2 | 13,000 |
| 2 | (United States) Bob Goalby | 69-72-71-67=279 | −1 | 6,700 |
| T3 | (United States) George Bayer | 69-70-71-71=281 | +1 | 3,450 |
| T3 | (United States) Jack Nicklaus | 71-74-69-67=281 | +1 | 3,450 |
| 5 | (United States) Doug Ford | 69-69-73-71=282 | +2 | 2,900 |
| 6 | (United States) Bobby Nichols | 72-70-71-70=283 | +3 | 2,500 |
| T7 | (United States) Jack Fleck | 74-69-70-71=284 | +4 | 2,067 |
| T7 | (United States) Paul Harney | 70-73-72-69=284 | +4 | 2,067 |
| T7 | (United States) Dave Ragan | 72-74-70-68=284 | +4 | 2,067 |
| 10 | (United States) Jay Hebert | 73-72-70-70=285 | +5 | 1,750 |
