= John Barnum =

American professional golfer (1911–1996)

Personal information
- Full name: John Oliver Barnum
- Nationality: United States
- Born: October 6, 1911 Willmar, Minnesota, U.S.
- Died: October 30, 1996 (aged 85) Florida

Career
- Sport: Golf
- Status: Professional
- Former tour: PGA Tour
- Professional wins: 14

Number of wins by tour
- PGA Tour: 1
- Other: 13

Best results in major championships
- Masters Tournament: DNP
- PGA Championship: T16: 1958
- U.S. Open: T31: 1950
- The Open Championship: DNP

John Oliver Barnum (October 6, 1911 – October 30, 1996) was an American professional golfer. He played on the PGA Tour in the 1950s and 1960s. He uniquely won his only PGA Tour event after the age of 50.

== Professional career ==
Barnum is notable for his four-stroke victory at age 51 at the Cajun Classic Open Invitational in November 1962. After Jim Barnes, he became the second player to win a PGA Tour event after turning fifty, and the only to win his first tour event entered past fifty. His best finish in a major was T-16 at the 1958 PGA Championship; he was the first round leader at the 1962 PGA Championship after a course record 66 at Aronimink Golf Club, but finished twenty strokes back.

Barnum won five Michigan PGA Senior titles and was runner-up three times in the PGA Seniors' Championship (1963, 1964, 1966).

== Awards and honors ==
- In 1972, Barnum was inducted into the Grand Rapids Sports Hall of Fame.
- In 1984, Barnum elected to the Michigan Golf Hall of Fame.

== Amateur wins ==
- 1939 Mexican Amateur
- 1940 Mexican Amateur

== Professional wins (14) ==
=== PGA Tour wins (1) ===
No.	Date	Tournament	Winning score	Margin of victory	Runner-up
1	Nov 11, 1962	Cajun Classic Open Invitational	−14 (68-70-63-69=270)	6 strokes	(United States) Gay Brewer

=== Other wins (8) ===
- 1950 Michigan Open
- 1957 Michigan PGA Championship
- 1958 Michigan Open, Michigan PGA Championship
- 1960 Michigan Open
- 1961 Michigan Open, Michigan PGA Championship
- 1963 Jamaica Open

=== Senior wins (5) ===
- Five Michigan PGA Senior Championships
