= George Bayer =

American professional golfer (1925–2003)

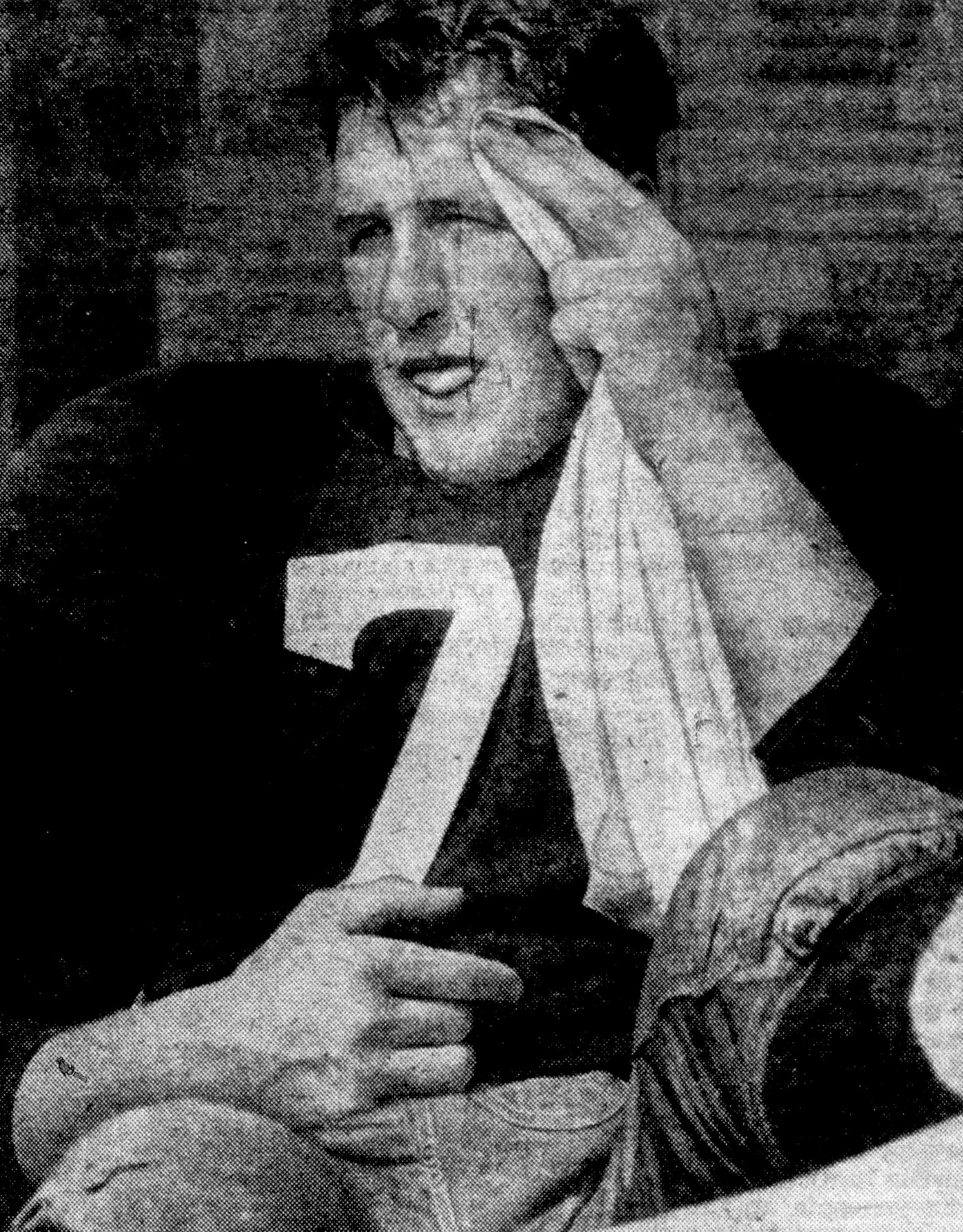
- Bayer in 1950

Personal information
- Nationality: United States
- Born: September 15, 1925 Bremerton, Washington, U.S.
- Died: March 16, 2003 (aged 77) Palm Springs, California, U.S.
- Height: 6 ft 5 in (1.96 m)
- Weight: 230 lb (104 kg; 16 st)
- Spouse: Mary Ann Bayer

Career
- Sport: Golf
- College: Washington
- Turned professional: 1954
- Former tours: PGA Tour; Senior PGA Tour
- Professional wins: 6

Number of wins by tour
- PGA Tour: 3
- Other: 2 (regular); 1 (senior)

Best results in major championships
- Masters Tournament: T15: 1965
- PGA Championship: T3: 1962
- U.S. Open: T11: 1964
- The Open Championship: DNP
- Military career
- Allegiance: United States
- Branch: United States Navy
- Service years: 1943–1946
- Conflicts: World War II

George Bayer (September 15, 1925 – March 16, 2003) was an American professional golfer who played on the PGA Tour and the Senior PGA Tour.

== Early life ==
Born and raised in Bremerton, Washington, Bayer was one of five brothers who grew up in a house near a country club. After graduation from Bremerton High School in 1943 during World War II, Bayer enlisted in the U.S. Navy and served for three years.

Bayer attended the University of Washington in Seattle, was a lineman on the Husky football team from 1946–1949, and played in the 1949 East-West Shrine Game.

== Professional career ==
=== Football career ===
Selected by the Washington Redskins in the twentieth round (253rd overall) of the 1950 NFL draft, Bayer was released by the Redskins and played for the Brooklyn Brooks and Richmond Arrows of the minor league American Football League in 1950.

=== Golf career ===
Bayer did not begin playing golf professionally until he was 29 years old; he started in golf as a caddie in his youth at Kitsap Golf and Country Club, located between Silverdale and his hometown of Bremerton.

At 6 ft 5 in (1.96 m) and 230 pounds (104 kg), the power that he could generate was astonishing, and he was known for booming 300-yard drives. Bayer won four times on the PGA Tour in a four-year period made remarkable by the fact that he played in an era of inconsistently wound balls; and laminated maple or persimmon clubs that were made for players of average height (5'9" tall) and build (160 pounds). His achievements came in an era when golf equipment was simply not available for extremely tall or extremely short people. He also won the par-3 contest at the Masters Tournament in 1963.

Bayer's best result in a major championship was at the PGA Championship in 1962 at Aronimink; he tied for third with Jack Nicklaus, three strokes behind winner Gary Player.

Bayer later played on the Senior PGA Tour; his best year was 1984 at 21st on the money list with $64,491. His last appearance in competitive golf was at the Liberty Mutual Legends of Golf in April 2002, less than a year before his death.

== Personal life ==
At age 77, Bayer suffered a fatal heart attack at home in Palm Springs, California while dining with his wife, golfer Bob Goalby, and Goalby's wife.

== Professional wins (6) ==
=== PGA Tour wins (3) ===
No.	Date	Tournament	Winning score	To par	Margin of victory	Runner-up
1	Jul 13, 1957	Canadian Open	70-68-64-69=271	–13	2 strokes	(United States) Bo Wininger
2	Dec 14, 1958	Mayfair Inn Open	68-67-69-68=272	–12	1 stroke	(United States) Chick Harbert
3	Mar 21, 1960	St. Petersburg Open Invitational	66-69-75-72=282	–6	Playoff	(United States) Jack Fleck

PGA Tour playoff record (1–2)

No.	Year	Tournament	Opponent(s)	Result
1	1957	Western Open	(United States) Doug Ford, (United States) Gene Littler, (United States) Billy Maxwell	Ford won with par on third extra hole Littler and Maxwell eliminated by par on first hole
2	1960	St. Petersburg Open Invitational	(United States) Jack Fleck	Won with birdie on first extra hole
3	1961	Ontario Open	(United States) Eric Monti, (United States) Bobby Nichols	Monti won with birdie on second extra hole

=== Other wins (3) ===
- 1958 Havana International
- 1973 Michigan Open
- 1997 Liberty Mutual Legends of Golf – Demaret Division (with Jim Ferree)
