= Champions Golf Club =

Golf club in Houston, Texas, US

- Location in the United States Location in Texas
- 29.983°N 95.531°W

Club information
- Established: 1957, 69 years ago
- Type: Private
- Total holes: 36
- Tournaments: 1967 Ryder Cup; 1969 U.S. Open; Tour Championship (5); Houston Open (5); 1993 U.S. Amateur; 2020 U.S. Women's Open
- Website: www.championsgolfclub.com

Cypress Creek
- Designed by: Ralph Plummer (1959); Chet Williams (2018 renovation)
- Par: 71
- Length: 7,301 yd (6,676 m)
- Course rating: 75.1
- Slope rating: 135

Jackrabbit
- Designed by: George Fazio and Tom Fazio (renovation)
- Par: 71
- Length: 7,021 yd (6,420 m)
- Course rating: 74.2
- Slope rating: 135
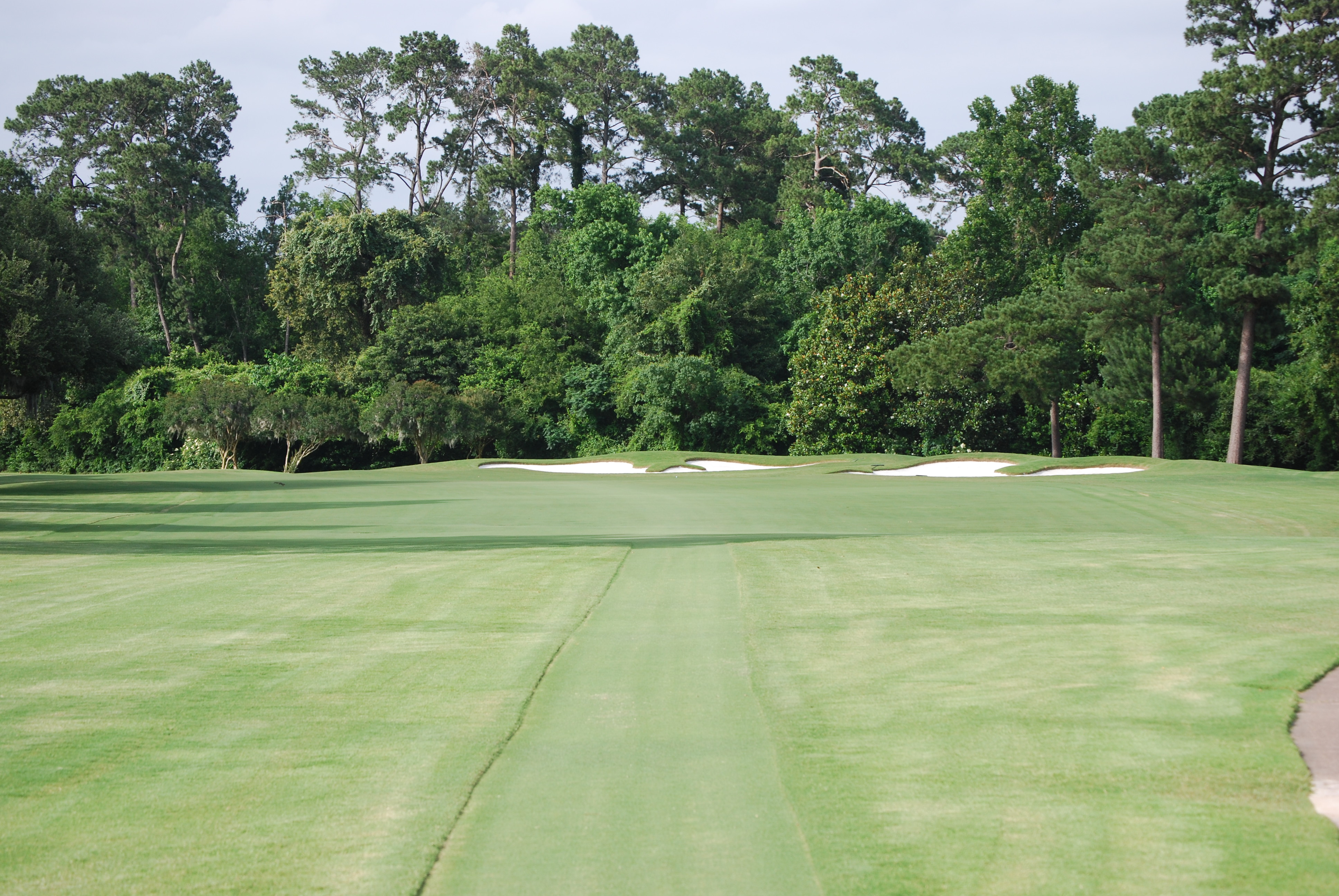
- Champions Golf Club in 2019

Champions Golf Club is a 36-hole private golf club located in Houston, Texas. Established in 1957 by multiple major champions Jack Burke Jr. and Jimmy Demaret, who were both raised in the city, Champions carries a long history for Houston golf. Burke (1923-2024) won the Masters and PGA Championship in 1956 and Demaret (1910–1983) was the first to win three Masters (1940, 1947, 1950).

The Cypress Creek course was designed by Ralph Plummer and opened for play 67 years ago in 1959. It was the site of the 1967 Ryder Cup, 1969 U.S. Open, five PGA Tour Championships, and the U.S. Amateur in 1993. It also hosted the Houston Champions International on the PGA Tour five times, which is now the Houston Open.

In 2018, the Cypress Creek course temporarily closed for a renovation in advance of hosting the 2020 US Women's Open. The renovation was completed by architect Chet Williams, known for his work across Texas including the design of Whispering Pines Golf Club in Trinity, TX.

The second course is the Jackrabbit course, which is used in qualifying rounds for the various USGA Championships the club has hosted, while Cypress Creek is the primary tournament venue. In 2020, golfers for the U. S. Women's Open played the first or second round at Jackrabbit with the other rounds at Cypress Creek because of the December tournament date caused by a global pandemic. The Jackrabbit course opened in 1964 and was designed by George Fazio, later renovated by nephew Tom Fazio.

The competitive course record at Cypress Creek is held by Chad Campbell, who shot a 10-under-par 61 in the third round en route to winning the Tour Championship in 2003, the last held at Champions.

== Tournaments ==
- 1966 Houston Champions International - Arnold Palmer
- 1967 Houston Champions International - Frank Beard
- 1967 Ryder Cup - U.S. team defeated Great Britain 23½ to 8½
- 1968 Houston Champions International - Roberto De Vicenzo
- 1969 U.S. Open - Orville Moody
- 1970 Houston Champions International - Gibby Gilbert
- 1971 Houston Champions International - Hubert Green
- 1973 Southern Amateur - Ben Crenshaw
- 1980 Southern Amateur - Bob Tway
- 1990 Nabisco Championship - Jodie Mudd
- 1993 U.S. Amateur - John Harris
- 1997 Tour Championship - David Duval
- 1998 U.S. Women's Mid-Amateur - Virginia Derby Grimes
- 1999 Tour Championship - Tiger Woods
- 2001 Tour Championship - Mike Weir
- 2003 Tour Championship - Chad Campbell
- 2017 U.S. Women's Mid-Amateur - Kelsey Chugg
- 2020 U.S. Women's Open - Kim A-lim

The club also hosts the Champions Cup Invitational, one of the premiere two-man best-ball amateur events, since 1961.

== Future Tournaments ==
- 2029 U.S. Senior Women's Open
- 2034 U.S. Mid-Amateur
- 2040 U.S. Senior Open

== Notable History ==
=== Ben Hogan ===
Ben Hogan was a frequent visitor to Champions and played in several tournaments hosted at the club. He played the last tournament of his career on the Cypress Creek course in 1971 after making a quintuple-bogey on Hole #4, a challenging par 3. Hogan hit his tee shot into the vegetation on the bank of the Cypress Creek and injured his knee searching for his ball. After deeming it unplayable, he returned to the tee box and hit two more shots into the Creek. He played his seventh shot onto the green and two putt for a score of 9.

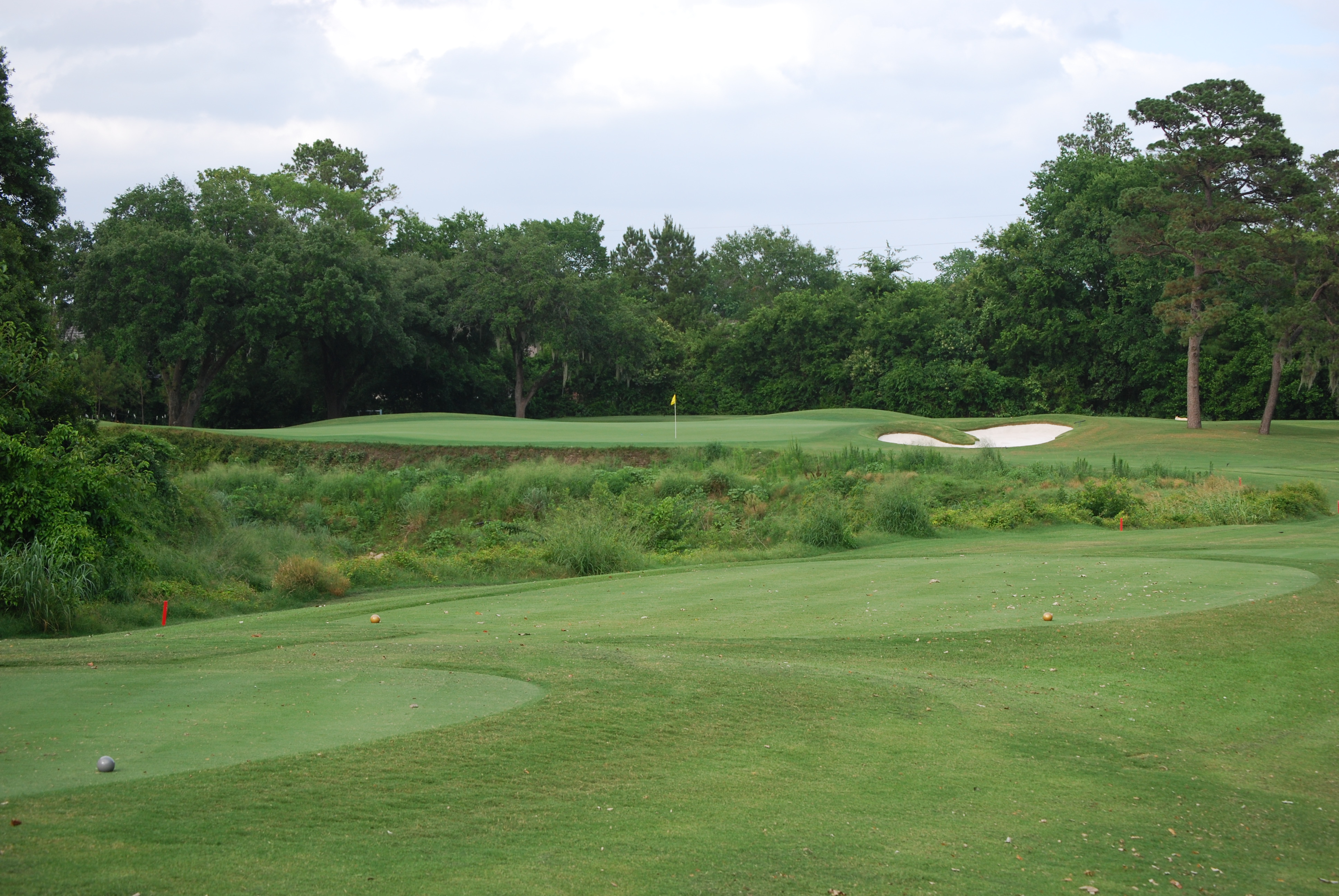
Hole 4 on the Cypress Creek course at Champions Golf Club

=== Phil Mickelson ===
Phil Mickelson visited Champions Golf Club in 1999 for putting lessons from Jackie Burke. Mickelson quipped that Billy Ray Brown warned him about missing short putts in front of Jackie, because Burke was notorious for punching unsuspecting students saying "It's got to hurt when you miss those!"
