= Eric Monti =

American professional golfer (1917–2009)

Personal information
- Nationality: United States
- Born: December 6, 1917 Pekin, Illinois, U.S.
- Died: February 1, 2009 (aged 91) Laguna Woods, California, U.S.
- Height: 5 ft 10 in (1.78 m)
- Weight: 156 lb (71 kg; 11.1 st)

Career
- Sport: Golf
- Turned professional: 1943
- Former tour: PGA Tour
- Professional wins: 9

Number of wins by tour
- PGA Tour: 3
- Other: 6

Best results in major championships
- Masters Tournament: 26th: 1950
- PGA Championship: T20: 1958
- U.S. Open: T6: 1961
- The Open Championship: DNP

Eric Monti (December 6, 1917 – February 1, 2009) was an American professional golfer who played on the PGA Tour in the 1940s, 1950s and 1960s.

== Career ==
Monti was born in Pekin, Illinois. He started caddying at age 6, and was one of six golfing brothers. He turned professional in 1943. He moved to Los Angeles with his wife in the mid-1940s, and began play on the PGA Tour in the late 1940s, winning three times. His best finish in a major championship was T-6 at the 1961 U.S. Open.

Like most golfers of his generation, Monti earned his living primarily as a club pro. He initially worked at the Los Angeles Country Club before being hired as an assistant pro to George Fazio at Hillcrest Country Club. In 1955, he became head pro at Hillcrest and developed a reputation as the teacher to the stars. Henry Fonda, Burt Lancaster, Danny Thomas, Dinah Shore, Danny Kaye, and Jack Benny were among the famous Hollywood celebrities he instructed. He worked at Hillcrest for 45 years before retiring in 1990.

== Personal life ==
In 2009, Monti died at his home in Laguna Woods, California of prostate cancer at the age of 91. His wife, Evelyn, predeceased him in 2006.

== Professional wins (9) ==
=== PGA Tour wins (3) ===
No.	Date	Tournament	Winning score	Margin of victory	Runner(s)-up
1	Mar 27, 1955	Miami Beach Open	−18 (69-68-65-68=270)	2 strokes	(United States) Bob Rosburg
2	Oct 11, 1959	Hesperia Open Invitational	−17 (70-68-64-69=271)	4 strokes	(United States) Bob Duden, (United States) Jack Fleck, (United States) Jay Hebert
3	Oct 15, 1961	Ontario Open	−3 (68-71-68-70=277)	Playoff	(United States) George Bayer, (United States) Bobby Nichols

PGA Tour playoff record (1–0)

No.	Year	Tournament	Opponents	Result
1	1961	Ontario Open	(United States) George Bayer, (United States) Bobby Nichols	Won with birdie on second extra hole

=== Other wins (6) ===
- 1952 Southern California PGA Championship
- 1953 Northern California Open, Southern California PGA Championship
- 1956 Southern California PGA Championship
- 1957 Southern California PGA Championship
- 1963 Southern California PGA Championship
