= Columbus Country Club =

Country club in Columbus, Ohio, US

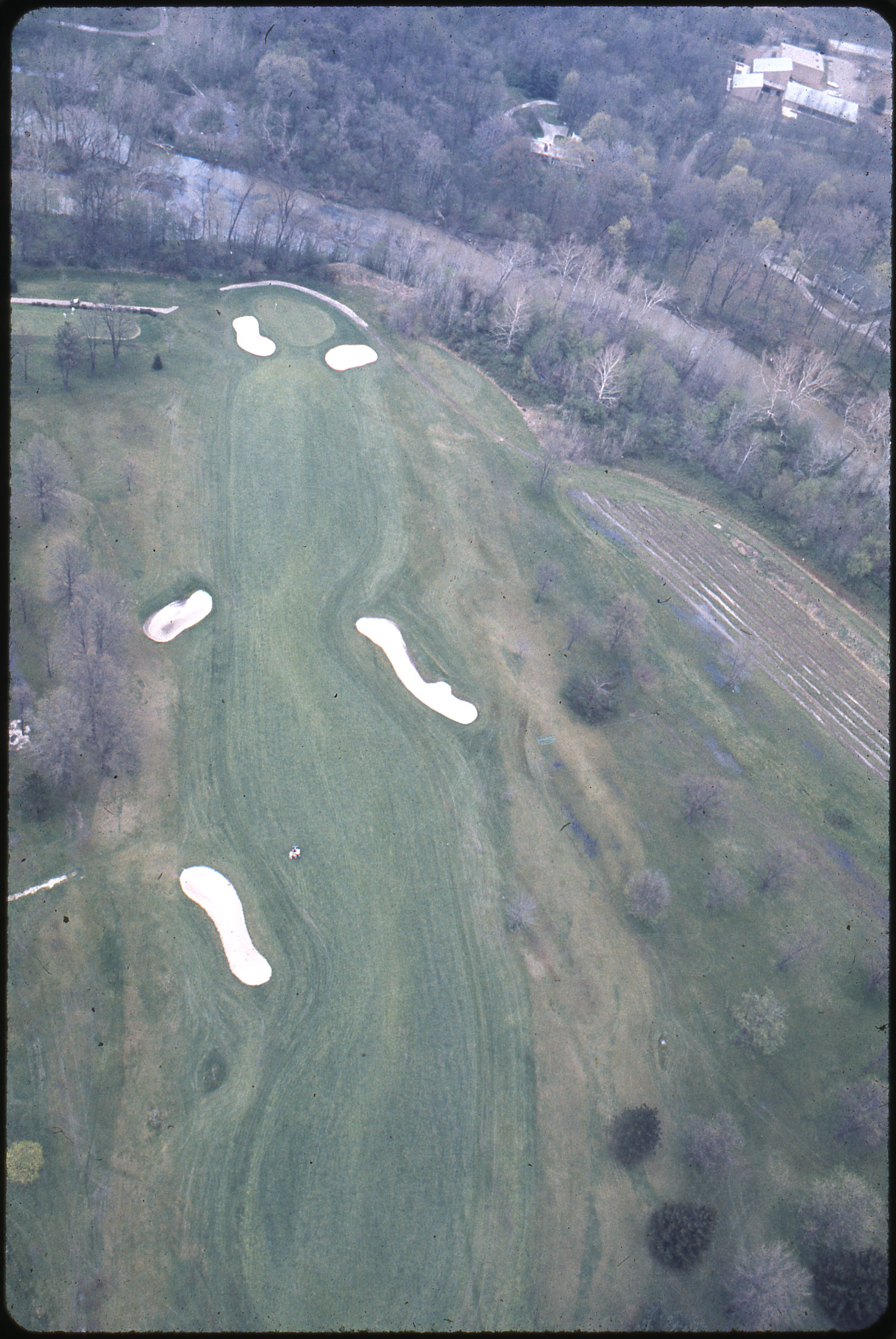
- Interactive map of Columbus Country Club
- 39°58′25″N 82°52′04″W

Club information
- Location: Columbus, Ohio
- Established: 1903
- Tournaments: 1964 PGA Championship
- Website: https://www.columbuscc.com/

Columbus Country Club is a country club located in Columbus, Ohio. The club was established in 1903. The golf course at the club hosted the PGA Championship in 1964, which Bobby Nichols won.
