= Bunky Henry =

American professional golfer (1944–2018)

Personal information
- Full name: George Walter Henry Jr.
- Nickname: Bunky
- Nationality: United States
- Born: February 8, 1944 Valdosta, Georgia, U.S.
- Died: August 17, 2018 (aged 74)
- Height: 5 ft 11 in (1.80 m)
- Weight: 195 lb (88 kg; 13.9 st)

Career
- Sport: Golf
- College: Georgia Tech
- Turned professional: 1967
- Former tours: PGA Tour; Senior PGA Tour
- Professional wins: 1

Number of wins by tour
- PGA Tour: 1

Best results in major championships
- Masters Tournament: CUT: 1966, 1970
- PGA Championship: T11: 1969
- U.S. Open: 9th: 1969
- The Open Championship: DNP

George Walter "Bunky" Henry Jr. (February 8, 1944 – August 17, 2018) was an American professional golfer who played on the PGA Tour in the 1960s and 1970s.

== Early life ==
In 1944, Henry was born in Valdosta, Georgia, He attended Georgia Tech in Atlanta on a football scholarship, and also played on the Yellow Jackets' golf team.

== Professional career ==
In 1967, Henry turned professional and played on the PGA Tour for 12 years.

Henry's career year in professional golf was 1969, when he won the National Airlines Open Invitational, and had his two best finishes in majors: solo ninth at the U.S. Open and T-11 at the PGA Championship.

Henry began play at age fifty on the Senior PGA Tour in 1994, and his best finish was a tie for third at the Boone Valley Classic in Missouri in 1996.

== Personal life ==
Henry died on August 17, 2018, at the age of 74.

== Awards and honors ==
In 2008, Henry was inducted into the Georgia Golf Hall of Fame.

== Amateur wins ==
- 1960 Georgia State Junior Jaycee Championship
- 1961 Golden Isles Invitational, Okeefenokee Invitational
- 1962 Southern Amateur
- 1965 Canadian Amateur
- 1966 Peach Blossom
- 1967 Peach Blossom

== Professional wins (1) ==
=== PGA Tour wins (1) ===
No.	Date	Tournament	Winning score	To par	Margin of victory	Runners-up
1	Mar 30, 1969	National Airlines Open Invitational	69-73-66-70=278	−10	1 stroke	(Australia) Bruce Crampton, (United States) Bob Murphy, (United States) Dan Sikes, (United States) Dave Stockton

== See also ==
- 1967 PGA Tour Qualifying School graduates
