= Jon Gustin =

American professional golfer (1932–1994)

Personal information
- Full name: Jon Carlton Gustin
- Nationality: United States
- Born: May 7, 1932 Kentucky, U.S.
- Died: April 9, 1994 (aged 61)

Career
- Sport: Golf
- Turned professional: 1951
- Former tour: PGA Tour
- Professional wins: 5

Best results in major championships
- Masters Tournament: DNP
- PGA Championship: T9: 1964
- U.S. Open: CUT: 1959, 1960, 1962, 1964, 1976
- The Open Championship: DNP

Jon Carlton Gustin (May 7, 1932 – April 9, 1994) was an American professional golfer.

== Career ==
In 1932, Gustin was born in Kentucky. He grew up in Birmingham, Alabama.

Gustin worked primarily as a club pro but played on the PGA Tour from 1956 to 1965. His best finish was a T-2 at the 1960 Cajun Classic Open Invitational. His best finish in a major was a T-9 at the 1964 PGA Championship.

== Professional wins ==
- Alabama Open (five times)
