= Al Johnston =

Scottish-Canadian professional golfer

Personal information
- Full name: Alexander Alan Johnston
- Nationality: Scotland; Canada
- Born: 17 March 1932 (age 94) Paisley, Scotland

Career
- Sport: Golf
- Status: Professional
- Former tour: PGA Tour
- Professional wins: 2

Number of wins by tour
- PGA Tour: 1

Best results in major championships
- Masters Tournament: DNP
- PGA Championship: CUT: 1962
- U.S. Open: CUT: 1963
- The Open Championship: CUT: 1968

Alexander Alan Johnston (born 17 March 1932) is a Scottish-Canadian professional golfer who played on the PGA Tour.

== Career ==
Johnston was born in Scotland. He moved to Canada in 1954 and became a Canadian citizen, living in Montreal. He played on the PGA Tour in the 1960s and early 1970s, winning once. He won the 1962 Hot Springs Open Invitational in a playoff over Bill Collins.

== Professional wins (2) ==
=== PGA Tour wins (1) ===
| No. | Date | Tournament | Winning score | Margin of victory | Runner-up |
|---|---|---|---|---|---|
| 1 | 20 May 1962 | Hot Springs Open Invitational | −15 (69-70-68-66=273) | Playoff | (United States) Bill Collins |

PGA Tour playoff record (1–0)

| No. | Year | Tournament | Opponent | Result |
|---|---|---|---|---|
| 1 | 1962 | Hot Springs Open Invitational | (United States) Bill Collins | Won with birdie on second extra hole |

=== Other wins (1) ===
- 1965 Canadian Match Play

== Team appearances ==
- Canada Cup (representing Canada): 1961
