= St. Petersburg Open Invitational =

Golf tournament formerly on the PGA Tour

Tournament information
- Location: St. Petersburg, Florida
- Established: 1930
- Courses: Lakewood Country Club; Pasadena Country Club; Sunset Country Club at Vinoy Park
- Par: 72/71
- Tour: PGA Tour
- Format: Stroke play
- Prize fund: US$25,000
- Month played: March
- Final year: 1964

Tournament record score
- Aggregate: 261 Bob Goalby (1961)
- To par: −23 as above

Final champion
- (Australia) Bruce Devlin

Location map
- Location in the United States Location in Florida

The St. Petersburg Open Invitational, first played as the St. Petersburg Open, was a PGA Tour event that was held at three St. Petersburg, Florida area clubs for 29 years from 1930 until 1964. The clubs that hosted the event were: Lakewood Country Club (now known as St. Petersburg Country Club), Pasadena Country Club (now known as Pasadena Yacht and Country Club), and Sunset Golf Club of the Vinoy Park Hotel (now known as the Vinoy Club, affiliated with Vinoy Hotel).

Bob Goalby won the 1961 event after making eight consecutive birdies in the final round, a PGA Tour record at the time. Other golfers tied Goalby's mark but nobody surpassed it till 2009. In 1963, Raymond Floyd won the event at 20 years 6 months of age becoming the youngest player to win a PGA Tour event since 1928.

Bruce Devlin, an Australian golfer who had recently moved to the United States, won the first of his eight PGA Tour titles at the last one in 1964. The tournament succumbed to financial pressure when the St. Petersburg City Council voted to postpone a decision on sponsorship of the 1965 event, and then Jacksonville announced the resumption of the Jacksonville Open during week the tournament was to be held.

== Tournament hosts ==
| Course | Years |
|---|---|
| Lakewood Country Club | 1930 (co-host), 1933 (co-host), 1936 (co-host), 1938, 1940, 1942, 1948, 1952, 1955–56, 1959–60, 1962–64 |
| Jungle Country Club | 1930 (co-host) |
| Pasadena Country Club | 1932, 1933 (co-host), 1934, 1936 (co-host), 1937, 1939, 1941, 1947, 1949–51, 1953, 1957–58, 1961 |
| Sunset Golf Club at Vinoy Park | 1946 |

== Winners ==
| Year | Winner | Score | To par | Margin of victory | Runner(s)-up | Winner's share ($) |
St. Petersburg Open Invitational
| 1964 | (Australia) Bruce Devlin | 272 | −16 | 4 strokes | (United States) Dan Sikes | 3,300 |
| 1963 | (United States) Raymond Floyd | 274 | −14 | 1 stroke | (United States) Dave Marr | 3,500 |
| 1962 | (United States) Bobby Nichols | 272 | −16 | 2 strokes | (United States) Frank Boynton | 2,800 |
| 1961 | (United States) Bob Goalby | 261 | −23 | 3 strokes | (United States) Ted Kroll | 2,800 |
| 1960 | (United States) George Bayer | 282 | −6 | Playoff | (United States) Jack Fleck | 2,000 |
| 1959 | (United States) Cary Middlecoff (2) | 275 | −13 | 3 strokes | (United States) Pete Cooper | 2,000 |
| 1958 | (United States) Arnold Palmer | 276 | −8 | 1 stroke | (United States) Dow Finsterwald (United States) Fred Hawkins | 2,000 |
St. Petersburg Open
| 1957 | (United States) Pete Cooper | 269 | −15 | 4 strokes | (United States) Jack Burke Jr. | 1,700 |
| 1956 | (United States) Mike Fetchick | 275 | −13 | Playoff | (United States) Lionel Hebert | 2,200 |
| 1955 | (United States) Cary Middlecoff | 274 | −14 | 2 strokes | (United States) Jay Hebert | 2,200 |
1954: No tournament
| 1953 | (United States) Dutch Harrison | 266 | −18 | 1 stroke | (United States) Chick Harbert (United States) Dick Mayer | 2,000 |
| 1952 | (United States) Jack Burke Jr. (2) | 266 | −22 | 8 strokes | (United States) Al Besselink | 2,000 |
| 1951 | (Australia) Jim Ferrier | 268 | −16 | 6 strokes | (United States) Al Brosch | 2,000 |
| 1950 | (United States) Jack Burke Jr. | 272 | −12 | 1 stroke | (United States) Chick Harbert | 2,000 |
| 1949 | (United States) Pete Cooper | 275 | −9 | 1 stroke | (United States) Cary Middlecoff | 2,000 |
| 1948 | (United States) Lawson Little | 272 | −16 | 3 strokes | (South Africa) Bobby Locke | 2,000 |
| 1947 | (United States) Jimmy Demaret (2) | 280 | −4 | 3 strokes | (Australia) Jim Ferrier | 2,000 |
| 1946 | (United States) Ben Hogan | 269 | −15 | 5 strokes | (United States) Sam Snead | 2,000 |
1943–1945: No tournament due to World War II
| 1942 | (United States) Sam Snead (3) | 286 | −2 | 3 strokes | (United States) Sam Byrd (United States) Chick Harbert (United States) Byron Nelson | 1,000 |
| 1941 | (United States) Sam Snead (2) | 279 | −5 | 2 strokes | (United States) Herman Barron (United States) Chick Harbert (United States) Ben Hogan (United States) Jug McSpaden | 1,200 |
| 1940 | (United States) Jimmy Demaret | 211 | −2 | 1 stroke | (United States) Byron Nelson | 700 |
| 1939 | (United States) Sam Snead | 207 | −9 | Playoff | (United States) Henry Picard | 700 |
| 1938 | (United States) Johnny Revolta | 282 | −2 | Playoff | (United States) Chandler Harper | 700 |
| 1937 | (England) Harry Cooper | 284 | −4 | Playoff | (United States) Ralph Guldahl (United States) Horton Smith | 700 |
| 1936 | (United States) Leonard Dodson | 283 | −3 | Playoff | (United States) Harry Cooper | 500 |
1935: No tournament
| 1934 | (United States) Paul Runyan | 141 | −3 | 3 strokes | (United States) Bill Mehlhorn | 200 |
| 1933 | (United States) Bob Stupple | 144 | +1 | 1 stroke | (United States) Denny Shute (United States) Al Watrous | 275 |
| 1932 | (Scotland) Willie Macfarlane | 209 | −7 | 1 stroke | (United States) Dave Hackney | 500 |
1931: No tournament
| 1930 | (United States) Jock Collins | 141 | +1 | 1 stroke | (United States) Horton Smith (United States) Frank Walsh | 1,000 |
