= LPGA Founders Cup =

Coordinates: 33.685°N 111.964°W

Founders Cup

Tournament information
- Location: Menlo Park, California
- Established: 2011
- Courses: Sharon Heights Golf & Country Club
- Tour: LPGA Tour
- Format: Stroke play - 72 holes (54 holes in 2011)
- Prize fund: $3 million
- Month played: March

Tournament record score
- Aggregate: 261 Kim Sei-young (2016)
- To par: −27 as above

Current champion
- (South Korea) Kim Hyo-joo

The LPGA Founders Cup is a women's professional golf tournament on the LPGA Tour. It debuted in February 2011 at the Wildfire Golf Club at JW Marriott Phoenix Desert Ridge Resort and Spa in Phoenix, Arizona. The tournament is designed as a tribute to the founders of the LPGA.

In 2011, using a unique format conducted for the first time in LPGA history, the players did not receive a cash payout. Instead, the tournament donated half of the $1 million tournament purse to charity and the other half to individual charities chosen by the top-10 finishers. All players who made the cut received a portion of the purse in the form of virtual earnings that were attributed to them for purposes of the LPGA official money list.

In 2012, the tournament expanded from three days to four days, and an actual cash purse was instituted.

Volvik took over sponsorships rights for the tournament in 2020, but the tournament was not played due to the COVID-19 pandemic.

In August 2025, the LPGA secured a new title sponsorship deal for the event with Fortinet. The tournament also moved to Sharon Heights Golf & Country Club in Menlo Park, California.

== Tournament names ==
- 2011–2013: RR Donnelley LPGA Founders Cup
- 2014–2016: JTBC Founders Cup
- 2017–2019: Bank of Hope Founders Cup
- 2020: Volvik Founders Cup
- 2021–2024: Cognizant Founders Cup
- 2025: Founders Cup presented by U.S. Virgin Islands
- 2026–present: Fortinet Founders Cup

== Winners ==
Year	Date	Champion	Country	Winning score	To par	Margin of victory	Purse ($)^{1}	Winner's share ($)	Venue	Results
2026	Mar 22	Kim Hyo-joo (2)	South Korea	63-70-66-73=272	−16	1 stroke	3,000,000	450,000	Sharon Heights Golf & Country Club	
2025	Feb 9	Yealimi Noh	United States	68-64-63-68=263	−21	4 strokes	2,000,000	300,000	Bradenton Country Club	
2024	May 12	Rose Zhang	United States	63-68-67-66=264	−24	2 strokes	3,000,000	450,000	Upper Montclair Country Club	
2023	May 14	Ko Jin-young (3)	South Korea	68-68-72-67=275	−13	Playoff	3,000,000	450,000	Upper Montclair Country Club	
2022	May 15	Minjee Lee	Australia	67-63-69-70=269	−19	2 strokes	3,000,000	450,000	Upper Montclair Country Club	
2021	Oct 10	Ko Jin-young (2)	South Korea	63-68-69-66=266	−18	4 strokes	3,000,000	450,000	Mountain Ridge Country Club	
2020: Canceled due to COVID-19 pandemic
2019	Mar 24	Ko Jin-young	South Korea	65-72-64-65=266	−22	1 stroke	1,500,000	225,000	Wildfire Golf Club	
2018	Mar 18	Inbee Park	South Korea	68-71-63-67=269	−19	5 strokes	1,500,000	225,000	Wildfire Golf Club	
2017	Mar 19	Anna Nordqvist	Sweden	67-67-61-68=263	−25	2 strokes	1,500,000	225,000	Wildfire Golf Club	
2016	Mar 20	Kim Sei-young	South Korea	63-66-70-62=261	−27	5 strokes	1,500,000	225,000	Wildfire Golf Club	
2015	Mar 22	Kim Hyo-joo	South Korea	65-69-66-67=267	−21	3 strokes	1,500,000	225,000	Wildfire Golf Club	
2014	Mar 23	Karrie Webb (2)	Australia	66-71-69-63=269	−19	1 stroke	1,500,000	225,000	Wildfire Golf Club	
2013	Mar 17	Stacy Lewis	United States	68-65-68-64=265	−23	3 strokes	1,500,000	225,000	Wildfire Golf Club	
2012	Mar 18	Yani Tseng	Taiwan	65-70-67-68=270	−18	1 stroke	1,500,000	225,000	Wildfire Golf Club	
2011	Mar 20	Karrie Webb	Australia	71-67-66=204	−12	1 stroke	1,000,000	200,000	Wildfire Golf Club	

^{1} In 2011, $500,000 of the purse went LPGA-USGA Girls Golf and $500,000 went to the top-10 finishers’ designated charities.
All winnings were attributed to the players for purposes of the 2011 LPGA Official money list.

== Tournament records ==
Year	Player	Score	Round
2017	Anna Nordqvist	61 (−11)	3rd
