= Bakersfield Country Club =

Golf course in Bakersfield, California

- Interactive map of Bakersfield Country Club
- 35.392°N 118.940°W

Club information
- Location: Bakersfield, California
- Established: 1950
- Type: Private
- Tota holes: 18
- Tournaments: Bakersfield Open Invitational (1961-1962)
- Website: bakersfieldcountryclub.com
- Designed by: William P. Bell
- Par: 72
- Length: 6,819 yards
- Course rating: 72.5

Bakersfield Country Club is an 18-hole private golf course located in Bakersfield, California. The course is 6,819 yards on hilly terrain, designed by William P. Bell. Being located in the foothills of northeast Bakersfield makes this one of the few courses within Kern County that is naturally hilly. The club has reciprocating privileges to all private golf clubs in the Greater Bakersfield area. It is a championship course, which has hosted the Bakersfield Open Invitational between 1961 and 1962, which was a tournament on the PGA Tour.

The club also includes: exercise rooms, club room (for cards), lounge, and four lighted tennis courts. Three dining facilities are provided for both lunch and dinner. Large banquet room provides space for large events, up to 250 people.

== Scorecard ==
Bakersfield Country Club
Tee	Rating/Slope	1	2	3	4	5	6	7	8	9	Out	10	11	12	13	14	15	16	17	18	In	Total
Blue	72.6/131	372	530	177	456	451	592	343	180	347	3448	393	515	360	227	441	531	296	192	419	3374	6822
White	71.0/127	358	493	164	450	411	560	315	162	326	3239	382	506	345	199	432	520	293	170	402	3245	6484
Gold	69.6/124	350	485	156	445	400	513	307	132	297	3085	372	496	335	196	429	512	288	156	325	3109	6194
Silver	66.1/113	325	434	129	335	328	472	258	105	240	2626	348	468	300	175	395	439	235	138	317	2815	5441
Par	Men's	4	5	3	4	4	5	4	3	4	36	4	5	4	3	4	5	4	3	4	36	72
SI	Men's	5	9	13	1	3	7	15	11	17		8	16	12	6	2	10	18	14	4
Gold	76.3/135	350	485	156	445	400	513	307	132	297	3085	372	496	335	196	429	512	288	156	325	3109	6194
Red	74.8/133	350	485	129	335	400	472	307	105	297	2880	372	496	335	175	429	512	288	156	325	3188	5968
Silver	72.1/126	325	434	129	335	328	472	258	105	240	2626	348	468	300	175	395	439	235	138	317	2815	5441
Par	Women's	4	5	3	4/5	4	5	4	3	4	36/37	4	5	4	3	5	5	4	3	4	37	73/74
SI	Women's Gold/Red	7	1	15	9	5	3	11	17	13		6	4	8	14	10	2	16	18	12
SI	Women's Silver	5	1	15	7	9	3	11	17	13		6	2	12	14	10	4	16	18	8
