= Jack Fleck =

American professional golfer (1921–2014)

Personal information
- Full name: Jack Donald Fleck
- Nationality: United States
- Born: November 8, 1921 Bettendorf, Iowa, U.S.
- Died: March 21, 2014 (aged 92) Fort Smith, Arkansas, U.S.
- Height: 6 ft 1 in (1.85 m)
- Weight: 167 lb (76 kg; 11.9 st)
- Spouses: Carmen Fleck (m. 2001); Lynn Burnsdale Fleck (m. 1949–1975, her death)
- Children: Craig H.

Career
- Sport: Golf
- College: None
- Turned professional: 1939
- Former tours: PGA Tour; Senior PGA Tour
- Professional wins: 9

Number of wins by tour
- PGA Tour: 3
- Other: 4 (regular); 2 (senior)

Best results in major championships (wins: 1)
- Masters Tournament: T11: 1962
- PGA Championship: T7: 1962
- U.S. Open: Won: 1955
- The Open Championship: DNP

Jackson Donald Fleck (November 8, 1921 – March 21, 2014) was an American professional golfer, best known for winning the U.S. Open in 1955 in a playoff over Ben Hogan.

== Early life ==
In 1921, Fleck was born. He was raised in Bettendorf, Iowa, Fleck's parents were poor farmers who had lost their land in the 1920s. He attended Davenport High School and played on its golf team. Fleck started as a caddie for a local dentist in the mid-1930s.

== Professional career ==
In 1939, Fleck turned professional. He worked as an assistant golf pro at the Des Moines Country Club for five dollars a week prior to World War II. He joined the military in 1942 and served in the U.S. Navy as a quartermaster; he participated in the D-Day invasion from a British rocket-firing ship off Normandy's Utah Beach. Within two weeks after his discharge from the service, Fleck was on the PGA's winter golf tour with pro friends trying to qualify for PGA Tour events.

After a few years of competing in local and PGA Tour events, Fleck decided to play full-time on the Tour for two years. Within six months, Fleck had his first win — on the biggest stage in men's professional golf — at the 1955 U.S. Open. Fleck won an 18-hole Sunday playoff by three strokes over his idol, Ben Hogan, at the Olympic Club in San Francisco. His first round deficit of nine strokes (behind Tommy Bolt) was the greatest number overcome by a U.S. Open winner. The following year he resigned his job as a municipal club pro in Davenport and moved to the Detroit area in October 1956.

Fleck made three playoffs on tour in 1960, winning at the Phoenix Open in February. He tied for third at the U.S. Open in 1960, and won his third and last tour event in October 1961, The Bakersfield Open, also in a playoff. Fleck finished in the top ten at the PGA Championship in 1962 at Aronimink near Philadelphia, a tie for seventh, then left the tour in 1963. He was a club pro in Wisconsin, Illinois, and California (Plumas Lake CC), and attempted a comeback on tour in 1970. Following the death of his wife Lynn in 1975, he qualified for the U.S. Open in 1977 at age 55, but missed the cut.

Less than two years later, Fleck won the PGA Seniors' Championship in February 1979, also won in a playoff, a year prior to the formation of the Senior PGA Tour.

In 1993, needing money to salvage a little golf course he owned in rural Arkansas that had been damaged by flooding, a place he called Li'l Bit of Heaven, he sold his 1955 U.S. Open gold medal.

== Personal life ==
Fleck met his first wife, Lynn Burnsdale of Chicago, when she stopped in the municipal course's pro shop in Davenport in 1949 with a club that needed repair. They were married six weeks later and late the next year added their only child, a son. Fleck wanted to name him Snead Hogan Fleck, but they settled on Craig, after Craig Wood, the winner of the Masters and U.S. Open in 1941. Lynn is credited with encouraging him to play on tour in the early 1950s and again in the early 1970s. She died in 1975 and Fleck remarried in 1980. He married his wife Carmen in 2001. He died on March 21, 2014, in Fort Smith, Arkansas, at the age of 92. He was the oldest living U.S. Open champion at the time of his death.

== Awards and honors ==
In 1990, Fleck was inducted into the Iowa Golf Hall of Fame.

== Professional wins (9) ==
=== PGA Tour wins (3) ===
Legend
Major championships (1)
Other PGA Tour (2)

No.	Date	Tournament	Winning score	To par	Margin of victory	Runner-up
1	Jun 19, 1955	U.S. Open	76-69-75-67=287	+7	Playoff	(United States) Ben Hogan
2	Feb 15, 1960	Phoenix Open Invitational	68-68-71-66=273	−11	Playoff	(United States) Bill Collins
3	Oct 1, 1961	Bakersfield Open	71-71-69-65=276	−12	Playoff	(United States) Bob Rosburg

PGA Tour playoff record (3–2)

No.	Year	Tournament	Opponent(s)	Result
1	1955	U.S. Open	(United States) Ben Hogan	Won 18-hole playoff; Fleck: −1 (69), Hogan: +2 (72)
2	1960	Phoenix Open Invitational	(United States) Bill Collins	Won 18-hole playoff; Fleck: −3 (68), Collins: E (71)
3	1960	St. Petersburg Open Invitational	(United States) George Bayer	Lost to birdie on first extra hole
4	1960	Insurance City Open Invitational	(United States) Bill Collins, (United States) Arnold Palmer	Palmer won with birdie on third extra hole Collins eliminated by birdie on first hole
5	1961	Bakersfield Open	(United States) Bob Rosburg	Won with birdie on first extra hole

=== Other wins (4) ===
- 1952 RGCC Shelden Invitational
- 1954 RGCC Shelden Invitational
- 1964 Illinois PGA Championship
- 1965 Illinois Open Championship

=== Senior wins (2) ===
- 1979 PGA Seniors' Championship
- 1995 Liberty Mutual Legends of Golf - Demaret Division (with Tommy Bolt)

== Major championships ==
=== Wins (1) ===
Year	Championship	54 holes	Winning score	Margin	Runner-up
1955	U.S. Open	3 shot deficit	+7 (76-69-75-67=287)	Playoff ^{1}	(United States) Ben Hogan

^{1} Defeated Hogan in an 18-hole playoff – Fleck 69 (–1), Hogan 72 (+2).

=== Results timeline ===
Tournament	1950	1951	1952	1953	1954	1955	1956	1957	1958	1959
Masters Tournament							T43	T26	T39	T18
U.S. Open	CUT			T52		1	CUT	T26	CUT	T19
PGA Championship				R64		R16	R32	R64	WD	

Tournament	1960	1961	1962	1963	1964	1965	1966	1967	1968	1969
Masters Tournament	T34	WD	T11	42	CUT	DQ				
U.S. Open	T3	T27		CUT			CUT	CUT		
PGA Championship	CUT	T19	T7	WD		T20	T49			

Tournament	1970	1971	1972	1973	1974	1975	1976	1977
Masters Tournament								
U.S. Open								CUT
PGA Championship								

Note: Fleck never played The Open Championship.

Win
Top 10
Did not play

CUT = missed the half-way cut (3rd round cut in 1960 PGA Championship)
DQ = disqualified
WD = withdrew
R64, R32, R16, QF, SF = Round in which player lost in PGA Championship match play
"T" = tied

=== Summary ===
Tournament	Wins	2nd	3rd	Top-5	Top-10	Top-25	Events	Cuts made
Masters Tournament	0	0	0	0	0	2	10	7
U.S. Open	1	0	1	2	2	3	13	6
The Open Championship	0	0	0	0	0	0	0	0
PGA Championship	0	0	0	0	2	5	11	8
Totals	1	0	1	2	4	10	34	21

- Most consecutive cuts made – 5 (three times)
- Longest streak of top-10s – 2 (1955 U.S. Open – 1955 PGA)

== U.S. national team appearances ==
- Hopkins Trophy: 1956 (winners)
