= Rio Grande Valley Open =

Golf tournament held in Texas, US

The Rio Grande Valley Open was a golf tournament on the PGA Tour that played in the Rio Grande Valley of south Texas in 1949 and 1950.

On February 27, 1949, Cary Middlecoff won the event. Jack Burke Jr. won on February 19 of the following year. It was Burke's first PGA Tour victory, which he calls his "best memory" in golf.

The 1948 event, which played as the Lower Rio Grande Open, was won by Lloyd Mangrum in an 18-hole playoff over Jimmy Demaret. Mangrum scored 65 to Demaret's 69 and received the $2,000 winners share out of a total of $10,000 in prize money.

The events were held at the Harlingen Municipal Golf Course in Harlingen, Texas, a 6,320-yard, par-71 course opened in 1929. Today the site of the tournament is known as the "eighteen" course at the Tony Butler Municipal Golf Course. On June 20, 1973, the City of Harlingen renamed the course in honor of Butler for his more than 40 years of service as head professional.

== Winners ==
Year	Player	Country	Score	To par	Margin of victory	Runner-up	Winner's share ($)
Rio Grande Valley Open
1950	Jack Burke Jr.	United States	264	−20	2 strokes	(United States) Skip Alexander	2,000
1949	Cary Middlecoff	United States	267	−17	2 strokes	(United States) Bob Hamilton	2,000
Lower Rio Grande Open
1948	Lloyd Mangrum	United States	269	−15	Playoff	(United States) Jimmy Demaret	2,000
