= Ontario Open (PGA Tour) =

Golf tournament in Ontario, California

Ontario Open Invitational
Tournament information
- Location: Ontario, California
- Established: 1961
- Course: Whispering Lakes Golf Course
- Par: 71
- Tour: PGA Tour
- Format: Stroke play
- Prize fund: US$25,000
- Month played: October
- Final year: 1962

Tournament record score
- Aggregate: 276 Al Geiberger (1962)
- To par: −8 as above

Final champion
- (United States) Al Geiberger
- Location in the United States Location in California

The Ontario Open was a golf tournament on the PGA Tour that was played in 1961 and 1962 at the Whispering Lakes Golf Course in Ontario, California, which opened in 1956.

The 1961 tournament, played from October 12–15, was won by 42-year-old Eric Monti of Los Angeles, when he sank an 8-foot birdie putt on the second extra hole of a three-way sudden death playoff with George Bayer and Bobby Nichols. The winners share was $2,800 out of a total purse of $20,000.

In the 1962 tournament, played October 18–21, Al Geiberger won his first PGA Tour event by one stroke over five other golfers. He won $3,500 from a $27,500 purse.

== Winners ==
Year	Winner	Score	To par	Margin of victory	Runners-up
Ontario Open Invitational
1962	(United States) Al Geiberger	276	−8	1 stroke	(United States) Gardner Dickinson (United States) Bob Goalby (United States) Tommy Jacobs (United States) Chuck Rotar (United States) John Ruedi
Ontario Open
1961	(United States) Eric Monti	277	−3	Playoff	(United States) George Bayer (United States) Bobby Nichols
