= Sunshine Open Invitational =

Golf tournament

Tournament information
- Location: Miami Beach, Florida
- Established: 1961
- Course: Bayshore Country Club
- Par: 72
- Tour: PGA Tour
- Format: Stroke play
- Prize fund: US$20,000
- Month played: March
- Final year: 1961

Tournament record score
- Aggregate: 273 Gary Player (1961)
- To par: −15 as above

Final champion
- (South Africa) Gary Player
- Location in the United States Location in Florida

The Sunshine Open Invitational was a PGA Tour event that played for one year at the Bayshore Country Club in Miami Beach, Florida. The 72-hole tournament was held from March 23–26, 1961; and was won by then 25-year-old Gary Player with a score of 273. Player received $3,500 in winnings. Arnold Palmer finished second winning $2,300. The Bayshore Country Club, now known as Miami Beach Golf Club, opened in 1923.

== Winners ==
Year	Winner	Score	To par	Margin of victory	Runner-up
1961	(South Africa) Gary Player	273	−15	1 stroke	(United States) Arnold Palmer
