= 1964 PGA Championship =

Coordinates: 39.973°N 82.868°W

Tournament information
- Dates: July 16–19, 1964
- Location: Columbus, Ohio
- Course: Columbus Country Club
- Organized by: PGA of America
- Tour: PGA Tour

Statistics
- Par: 70
- Length: 6,851 yards (6,265 m)
- Field: 162 players, 93 after 1st cut 65 after 2nd cut
- Cut: 150 (+10) (1st cut); 221 (+11) (2nd cut)
- Prize fund: $100,000
- Winner's share: $18,000

Champion
- (United States) Bobby Nichols
- 271 (−9)

Location in the United States

The 1964 PGA Championship was the 46th PGA Championship, played July 16–19 at Columbus Country Club in Columbus, Ohio. Bobby Nichols won his only major title, three strokes ahead of runners-up Jack Nicklaus and Arnold Palmer. Nichols led wire-to-wire after a first round 64 in the hometown of Nicklaus, who shot a 64 in the final round to gain his third runner-up finish in majors in 1964.

Ben Hogan, age 51, competed at the PGA Championship for the first time since 1960. Tied for fifth place after a third round 68, he finished tied for ninth for his penultimate top ten in a major. His final top ten came at the 1967 Masters.

Nichols' winning score of 271 was the lowest to date at the PGA Championship, the seventh as a 72-hole stroke play championship. It stood as the record for thirty years, until Nick Price's 269 in 1994.

Nichols' win marked the third time that all of the professional major championships were won by Americans in a calendar year.

1964 was the last time that a cut was made after three rounds in the PGA championship - the previous third round cuts were 1958, 1959, 1960 & 1962.

The British Open was played the previous week in St Andrews, Scotland, one of five times in the 1960s that these two majors were played in consecutive weeks in July. The PGA Championship moved to August in 1969 (except 1971, when it was played in late February) until 2019, when it moved to mid-May.

== Round summaries ==
=== First round ===
Thursday, July 16, 1964

Place	Player	Score	To par
1	(United States) Bobby Nichols	64	−6
T2	(United States) Jack Nicklaus	67	−3
T2	(United States) Mike Souchak	67	−3
T4	(United States) Billy Casper	68	−2
T4	(New Zealand) Bob Charles	68	−2
T4	(United States) Paul Haviland	68	−2
T4	(United States) Don January	68	−2
T4	(United States) Tom Nieporte	68	−2
T4	(United States) Arnold Palmer	68	−2
T10	(United States) Joe Conrad	69	−1
T10	(United States) Jon Gustin	69	−1
T10	(United States) Bob Keller	69	−1
T10	(United States) Bo Wininger	69	−1

=== Second round ===
Friday, July 17, 1964

Place	Player	Score	To par
1	(United States) Bobby Nichols	64-71=135	−5
2	(United States) Arnold Palmer	68-68=136	−4
T3	(United States) Ken Venturi	72-65=137	−3
T3	(United States) Bo Wininger	69-68=137	−3
T5	(New Zealand) Bob Charles	68-71=139	−1
T5	(United States) Tony Lema	71-68=139	−1
T5	(United States) Tom Nieporte	68-71=139	−1
T5	(United States) Mason Rudolph	73-66=139	−1
T9	(United States) Billy Casper	68-72=140	E
T9	(United States) Ed Furgol	71-69=140	E
T9	(United States) Jack Nicklaus	67-73=140	E
T9	(United States) Mike Souchak	67-73=140	E

=== Third round ===
Saturday, July 18, 1964

Place	Player	Score	To par
1	(United States) Bobby Nichols	64-71-69=204	−6
2	(United States) Arnold Palmer	68-68-69=205	−5
T3	(United States) Tom Nieporte	68-71-68=207	−3
T3	(United States) Mason Rudolph	73-66-68=207	−3
T5	(United States) Billy Casper	68-72-70=210	E
T5	(United States) Ben Hogan	70-72-68=210	E
T5	(United States) Jack Nicklaus	67-73-70=210	E
T5	(United States) Ken Venturi	72-65-73=210	E
T5	(United States) Bo Wininger	69-68-73=210	E
T10	(United States) Tony Lema	71-68-72=211	+1
T10	(United States) Mike Souchak	67-73-71=211	+1

=== Final round ===
Sunday, July 19, 1964

Place	Player	Score	To par	Money ($)
1	(United States) Bobby Nichols	64-71-69-67=271	−9	18,000
T2	(United States) Jack Nicklaus	67-73-70-64=274	−6	9,000
T2	(United States) Arnold Palmer	68-68-69-69=274	−6	9,000
4	(United States) Mason Rudolph	73-66-68-69=276	−4	5,000
T5	(United States) Tom Nieporte	68-71-68-72=279	−1	3,850
T5	(United States) Ken Venturi	72-65-73-69=279	−1	3,850
7	(United States) Bo Wininger	69-68-73-70=280	E	3,200
8	(United States) Gay Brewer	72-71-71-67=281	+1	2,900
T9	(United States) Billy Casper	68-72-70-72=282	+2	2,300
T9	(United States) Jon Gustin	69-76-71-66=282	+2	2,300
T9	(United States) Ben Hogan	70-72-68-72=282	+2	2,300
T9	(United States) Tony Lema	71-68-72-71=282	+2	2,300
