= 1969 U.S. Open (golf) =

Coordinates: 29.983°N 95.531°W

Tournament information
- Dates: June 12–15, 1969
- Location: Houston, Texas
- Course(s): Champions Golf Club; Cypress Creek Course
- Organized by: USGA
- Tour: PGA Tour

Statistics
- Par: 70
- Length: 6,967 yards (6,371 m)
- Field: 149 players, 68 after cut
- Cut: 148 (+8)
- Prize fund: $205,300
- Winner's share: $30,000

Champion
- (United States) Orville Moody
- 281 (+1)

Location in the United States
Location in Texas

The 1969 U.S. Open was the 69th U.S. Open, held June 12–15 at the Cypress Creek Course of Champions Golf Club in Houston, Texas. Orville Moody won his only PGA Tour title, one stroke ahead of runners-up Deane Beman, Bob Rosburg, and Al Geiberger.

A 14-year veteran of the U.S. Army, Moody entered the final round in second place, three shots behind Miller Barber. At age 35, Moody advanced through both local and sectional qualifying in 1969, and as of 2021 is the last champion to do so. It was his only win on the PGA Tour, with only one additional top-10 finish in a major, two months later at the PGA Championship.

Battling an ailing knee, defending champion Lee Trevino (of Texas) missed the cut by a stroke; he won the title again in 1971.

The Cypress Creek Course hosted the Houston Champions International event on the PGA Tour, today's Houston Open, from 1966 through 1971, and the Ryder Cup in 1967. It later hosted The Tour Championship five times (1990, 1997, 1999, 2001, and 2003) and the U.S. Amateur in 1993.

== Course layout ==
Hole	1	2	3	4	5	6	7	8	9	Out	10	11	12	13	14	15	16	17	18	In	Total
Yards	435	444	379	193	451	418	417	180	505	3,422	448	450	213	544	430	418	175	436	431	3,545	6,967
Par	4	4	4	3	4	4	4	3	5	35	4	4	3	5	4	4	3	4	4	35	70

== Round summaries ==
=== First round ===
Thursday, June 12, 1969

Place	Player	Score	To par
1	(United States) Bob Murphy	66	−4
2	(United States) Miller Barber	67	−3
T3	(United States) Deane Beman	68	−2
T3	(United States) Al Geiberger	68	−2
T5	(United States) George Archer	69	−1
T5	(United States) Dean Refram	69	−1
T5	(United States) Tom Weiskopf	69	−1
T8	(United States) Richard Crawford	70	E
T8	(United States) Jack Ewing	70	E
T8	(United States) Bunky Henry	70	E
T8	(Canada) George Knudson	70	E
T8	(United States) Arnold Palmer	70	E
T8	(United States) Bob Rosburg	70	E

=== Second round ===
Friday, June 13, 1969

Place	Player	Score	To par
1	(United States) Deane Beman	68-69=137	−3
T2	(United States) Miller Barber	67-71=138	−2
T2	(United States) Bob Murphy	66-72=138	−2
4	(United States) Bob Rosburg	70-69=139	−1
T5	(United States) Charles Coody	72-68=140	E
T5	(United States) Al Geiberger	68-72=140	E
T5	(Canada) George Knudson	70-70=140	E
T8	(England) Tony Jacklin	71-70=141	+1
T8	(United States) Johnny Miller	71-70=141	+1
T8	(United States) Orville Moody	71-70=141	+1
T8	(United States) Jack Nicklaus	74-67=141	+1

=== Third round ===
Saturday, June 14, 1969

Place	Player	Score	To par
1	(United States) Miller Barber	67-71-68=206	−4
2	(United States) Orville Moody	71-70-68=209	−1
T3	(United States) Deane Beman	68-69-73=210	E
T3	(United States) Bunky Henry	70-72-68=210	E
5	(United States) Bob Rosburg	70-69-72=211	+1
T6	(United States) Charles Coody	72-68-72=212	+2
T6	(United States) Al Geiberger	68-72-72=212	+2
T6	(United States) Bobby Mitchell	72-74-66=212	+2
T6	(United States) Bob Murphy	66-72-74=212	+2
T6	(United States) Arnold Palmer	70-73-69=212	+2

=== Final round ===
Sunday, June 15, 1969

Miller Barber began the final round with a three-stroke lead, but it vanished after he bogeyed five of the first eight holes. He struggled to a 78 (+8) and dropped into a tie for sixth place, which allowed Moody to take the lead. At one point on the back nine, eight competitors were separated by just two shots. Bob Rosburg saved par from the sand at 17 to stay tied with Moody, but after a drive into the rough on 18, he again found a greenside bunker. Another sand shot got him to 3 feet (0.9 m), but he missed the putt for par to force an 18-hole Monday playoff. Playing in the final pairing with Barber, Moody had four consecutive pars to finish and preserved the one-stroke advantage for the championship. Barber needed only a 75 (+5) on Sunday to force a playoff, but finished three strokes back.

==== Final leaderboard ====
Champion
Low amateur
(a) = amateur
(c) = past champion

Top 10
Place	Player	Score	To par	Money (US$)
1	(United States) Orville Moody	71-70-68-72=281	+1	30,000
T2	(United States) Deane Beman	68-69-73-72=282	+2	11,000
T2	(United States) Al Geiberger	68-72-72-70=282	+2	11,000
T2	(United States) Bob Rosburg	70-69-72-71=282	+2	11,000
5	(United States) Bob Murphy	66-72-74-71=283	+3	7,000
T6	(United States) Miller Barber	67-71-68-78=284	+4	5,000
T6	(Australia) Bruce Crampton	73-72-68-71=284	+4	5,000
T6	(United States) Arnold Palmer (c)	70-73-69-72=284	+4	5,000
9	(United States) Bunky Henry	70-72-68-75=285	+5	3,500
T10	(United States) George Archer	69-74-73-70=286	+6	2,800
T10	(Australia) Bruce Devlin	73-74-70-69=286	+6	2,800
T10	(United States) Dave Marr	75-69-71-71=286	+6	2,800

Leaderboard below the top 10
Place	Player	Score	To par	Money ($)
T13	(United States) Julius Boros (c)	71-73-70-73=287	+7	1,888
T13	(United States) Charles Coody	72-68-72-75=287	+7	1,888
T13	(United States) Dale Douglass	76-69-70-72=287	+7	1,888
T13	(United States) Raymond Floyd	79-68-68-72=287	+7	1,888
T13	(United States) Dave Hill	73-74-70-70=287	+7	1,888
T13	(United States) Howie Johnson	72-73-72-70=287	+7	1,888
T13	(United States) Dean Refram	69-74-70-74=287	+7	1,888
T13	(United States) Phil Rodgers	76-70-69-72=287	+7	1,888
T13	(United States) Kermit Zarley	74-72-70-71=287	+7	1,888
T22	(Australia) Bob Stanton	74-70-71-73=288	+8	1,500
T22	(United States) Tom Weiskopf	69-75-71-73=288	+8	1,500
T22	(United States) Bert Yancey	71-71-74-72=288	+8	1,500
T25	(United States) Joe Campbell	73-74-73-69=289	+9	1,300
T25	(United States) Richard Crawford	70-75-73-71=289	+9	1,300
T25	(England) Tony Jacklin	71-70-73-75=289	+9	1,300
T25	(United States) Bobby Mitchell	72-74-66-77=289	+9	1,300
T25	(United States) Jack Nicklaus (c)	74-67-75-73=289	+9	1,300
T25	(United States) Dave Stockton	75-68-72-73=289	+9	1,300
T31	(United States) Rich Bassett	73-74-69-74=290	+10	1,140
T31	(South Africa) Bobby Cole	73-73-72-73=290	+10	1,140
T31	(United States) Bobby Nichols	74-74-72-70=290	+10	1,140
T31	(United States) Bob Smith	76-67-72-75=290	+10	1,140
T31	(United States) Jerry Steelsmith	72-72-75-71=290	+10	1,140
T36	(United States) Homero Blancas	72-73-69-77=291	+11	1,070
T36	(Canada) George Knudson	70-70-76-75=291	+11	1,070
T38	(United States) Dan Sikes	74-74-72-72=292	+12	1,030
T38	(United States) Sam Snead	71-77-70-74=292	+12	1,030
T40	(United States) Tommy Aaron	71-72-73-77=293	+13	995
T40	(United States) Billy Casper (c)	74-73-72-74=293	+13	995
T42	(Canada) Al Balding	74-73-73-74=294	+14	955
T42	(United States) Bert Greene	78-70-74-72=294	+14	955
T42	(United States) Bob Lunn	71-72-76-75=294	+14	955
T42	(United States) Johnny Miller	71-70-80-73=294	+14	955
T42	(United States) Jack Montgomery	74-73-72-75=294	+14	955
T42	(United States) Mike Souchak	72-73-74-75=294	+14	955
T48	(United States) Don Bies	78-70-70-77=295	+15	915
T48	(South Africa) Gary Player (c)	71-75-72-77=295	+15	915
T50	(United States) Frank Beard	72-73-73-78=296	+16	895
T50	(United States) Robert Stone	74-72-75-75=296	+16	895
T52	(United States) Bill Collins	75-72-73-77=297	+17	865
T52	(United States) Lionel Hebert	74-73-77-73=297	+17	865
T52	(United States) Bob Payne	71-74-73-79=297	+17	865
T52	(United States) John Schlee	74-74-78-71=297	+17	865
T56	(United States) Bill Odgen	76-72-75-75=298	+18	835
T56	(United States) Ken Still	74-74-72-78=298	+18	835
T58	(United States) Pete Brown	74-74-74-77=299	+19	805
T58	(United States) Jack Ewing	70-76-80-73=299	+19	805
T58	(United States) Labron Harris	71-75-75-78=299	+19	805
T58	(United States) Larry Hinson	73-75-76-75=299	+19	805
T58	(United States) Rives McBee	71-77-76-75=299	+19	805
T58	(United States) David Philo	71-74-78-76=299	+19	805
64	(United States) Martin Bohen	72-75-74-81=301	+21	800
T65	(United States) Dave Eichelberger	76-71-76-80=303	+23	800
T65	(United States) Dow Finsterwald	77-71-77-78=303	+23	800
67	(United States) Lee Elder	74-73-79-82=308	+28	800
68	(United States) Chuck Courtney	72-76-80-82=310	+30	800
CUT			+9	
CUT			+10	
CUT			+11	
CUT			+12	
CUT			+13	
CUT			+14	
CUT			+15	
CUT			+16	
CUT			+17	
CUT			+18	
CUT			+19	
CUT			+20	
CUT			+21	
CUT			+22	
CUT			+23	
CUT			+24	
CUT			+25	
CUT			+27	
CUT			+31	
WD	(United States) Don January	76	+6	
WD	(United States) Dan Keefe	0	E	

==== Scorecard ====
Final round

Hole	1	2	3	4	5	6	7	8	9	10	11	12	13	14	15	16	17	18
Par	4	4	4	3	4	4	4	3	5	4	4	3	5	4	4	3	4	4
(United States) Moody	−1	−1	−1	E	E	E	E	E	−1	E	E	E	E	+1	+1	+1	+1	+1
(United States) Beman	+1	+2	+1	+2	+4	+4	+3	+3	+2	+2	+2	+2	+2	+3	+3	+3	+3	+2
(United States) Geiberger	+3	+4	+4	+4	+6	+6	+6	+5	+4	+3	+3	+3	+2	+2	+1	+2	+2	+2
(United States) Rosburg	+1	E	E	E	E	E	E	+1	E	E	+1	+1	+1	+1	+1	+1	+1	+2
(United States) Murphy	+2	+2	+2	+3	+3	+3	+3	+3	+2	+3	+2	+3	+2	+3	+3	+3	+3	+3
(United States) Barber	−4	−3	−2	−2	−1	E	E	+1	E	E	E	+2	+3	+3	+4	+3	+3	+4
(United States) Crampton	+3	+3	+3	+3	+3	+3	+4	+4	+3	+3	+3	+3	+2	+2	+3	+3	+4	+4
(United States) Palmer	+1	+2	+2	+3	+3	+3	+3	+3	+3	+3	+3	+3	+2	+2	+3	+4	+4	+4
(United States) Henry	+1	+2	+3	+4	+4	+4	+4	+4	+4	+4	+3	+4	+4	+5	+5	+5	+5	+5
(United States) Archer	+5	+6	+6	+7	+8	+7	+6	+6	+6	+5	+6	+6	+6	+6	+6	+6	+6	+6
(Australia) Devlin	+6	+6	+6	+5	+5	+6	+5	+5	+5	+5	+6	+6	+5	+5	+5	+6	+6	+6
(United States) Marr	+5	+5	+4	+4	+4	+5	+5	+6	+6	+6	+7	+8	+7	+7	+7	+6	+6	+6

Cumulative tournament scores, relative to par

Birdie	Bogey	Double bogey
