= Bakersfield Open Invitational =

Former PGA golf tournament

Tournament information
- Location: Bakersfield, California
- Established: 1961
- Course: Bakersfield Country Club
- Par: 72
- Tour: PGA Tour
- Format: Stroke play
- Prize fund: US$40,000
- Month played: October
- Final year: 1962

Tournament record score
- Aggregate: 272 Billy Casper (1962)
- To par: −16 as above

Final champion
- (United States) Billy Casper
- Location in the United States Location in California

The Bakersfield Open Invitational was a golf tournament on the PGA Tour that was played at the Bakersfield Country Club in Bakersfield, California in the early 1960s. The inaugural event played as the Bakersfield Open in 1961.

== Winners ==
Year	Winner	Score	To par	Margin of victory	Runner-up
Bakersfield Open Invitational
1962	(United States) Billy Casper	272	−16	4 strokes	(United States) Tony Lema
Bakersfield Open
1961	(United States) Jack Fleck	276	−12	Playoff	(United States) Bob Rosburg
