= 1956 PGA Championship =

Coordinates: 42.190°N 71.137°W

Tournament information
- Dates: July 20–24, 1956
- Location: Canton, Massachusetts
- Course: Blue Hill Country Club
- Organized by: PGA of America
- Tour: PGA Tour
- Format: Match play - 7 rounds

Statistics
- Par: 71
- Length: 6,634 yards (6,066 m)
- Field: 128 players (all match play)
- Prize fund: $40,000
- Winner's share: $5,000

Champion
- (United States) Jack Burke Jr.
- def. Ted Kroll, 3 and 2

Location in the United States
Location in Massachusetts

The 1956 PGA Championship was the 38th edition of the professional golf competition, held at Blue Hill Country Club in Canton, Massachusetts, a suburb southwest of Boston. Jack Burke Jr. won his second major championship of 1956, a 3 and 2 victory over Ted Kroll; Burke had won the Masters in April. It was the penultimate PGA Championship as a match play competition; stroke play was introduced two years later in 1958. This was the tenth and final year the PGA Championship was scheduled for a Tuesday finish.

Defending champion Doug Ford was stopped in the third round by 1953 champion Walter Burkemo, 5 and 3.

Blue Hill was not highly regarded as a championship venue and calls increased for a change in format to stroke play. Also, a five-year membership in the PGA of America was necessary to compete in the PGA Championship at the time; this excluded young professionals Arnold Palmer, Dow Finsterwald, Gene Littler, and Mike Souchak.

This remains the only time the PGA Championship has been played in Massachusetts. It was the 8th major championship played in the state and the first in over 30 years, since the 1925 U.S. Open. The next major held in the state would be the 1963 U.S. Open.

Burke was the second to win the Masters and PGA Championship in the same calendar year, following Sam Snead in 1949. Through 2016, it has only been accomplished four times, with the latter two by Jack Nicklaus in 1963 and 1975.

The Open Championship was held two weeks earlier in England at Royal Liverpool Golf Club; neither Burke nor Kroll played in 1956 (or ever).

In the skills competitions held on Thursday, Joe Kraak won the long driving contest at 300 yards (274 m).

== Format ==
The match play format at the PGA Championship was modified in 1956 and called for 9 rounds (162 holes) in five days, Friday through Tuesday. Previously, a two-day stroke play qualifying segment (36 holes) on Wednesday and Thursday preceded the match play competition to narrow the field to 64 competitors. This year, 128 players were entered in the single-elimination bracket. The first five rounds were 18-hole matches contested over the first three days, which reduced the field to four players. The semifinals and finals were 36-hole matches played on the final two days, Monday and Tuesday.

- Friday – first round, 18 holes
- Saturday – second and third rounds, 18 holes each
- Sunday – fourth round and quarterfinals, 18 holes each
- Monday – semifinals – 36 holes
- Tuesday – final – 36 holes

== Final results ==
Tuesday, July 24, 1956

Place	Player	Money ($)
1	(United States) Jack Burke Jr.	5,000
2	(United States) Ted Kroll	3,000
T3	(United States) Ed Furgol	1,000
T3	(United States) Bill Johnston	1,000
T5	(United States) Sam Snead	500
T5	(United States) Fred Hawkins	500
T5	(United States) Terl Johnson	500
T5	(United States) Henry Ransom	500

== Final eight bracket ==
In the Sunday quarterfinals, Ted Kroll defeated favorite Sam Snead 2 and 1. In the semifinals, Kroll needed only 28 holes to handily defeat Bill Johnston 10 and 8, but Burke's match went 37 holes, extended to an extra hole to stop Ed Furgol, the 1954 U.S. Open champion. In the final on Tuesday, Burke was three holes down to Kroll after 19 holes, then won five of the next seven holes. The two then halved the next seven holes and Kroll's bogey at the par-3 34th hole ended the match at 3 and 2.

Quarter-finals; July 22
Jack Burke Jr.	4&2
Fred Hawkins
Ed Furgol	1up
Terl Johnson
Ted Kroll	2&1
Sam Snead
Bill Johnston	3&2
Henry Ransom

Semi-finals; July 23
Jack Burke Jr.	37h
Ed Furgol
Ted Kroll	10&8
Bill Johnston

Finals; July 24
Jack Burke Jr.	3&2
Ted Kroll

== Final match scorecards ==
Morning

Hole	1	2	3	4	5	6	7	8	9	10	11	12	13	14	15	16	17	18
Par	4	4	4	3	4	4	3	5	5	4	4	4	3	4	4	3	4	5
(United States) Burke	4	4	4	2	5	5	3	5	4	4	4	5	3	4	4	3	3	4
(United States) Kroll	4	4	4	3	4	4	3	5	4	3	4	4	3	4	4	4	3	4
Leader	–	–	–	B1	–	K1	K1	K1	K1	K2	K2	K3	K3	K3	K3	K2	K2	K2

Afternoon

Hole	1	2	3	4	5	6	7	8	9	10	11	12	13	14	15	16	17	18
Par	4	4	4	3	4	4	3	5	5	4	4	4	3	4	4	3	4	5
(United States) Burke	5	4	4	2	4	3	2	4	4	4	4	5	3	4	4	2	Burke wins 3 and 2	
(United States) Kroll	4	5	4	3	4	4	3	5	4	4	4	5	3	4	4	4	Burke wins 3 and 2	
Leader	K3	K2	K2	K1	K1	–	B1	B2	B2	B2	B2	B2	B2	B2	B2	B3	Burke wins 3 and 2	

Birdie	Bogey
