= Dow Jones Open Invitational =

Golf tournament formerly on the PGA Tour

Tournament information
- Location: Clifton, New Jersey
- Established: 1970
- Course: Upper Montclair Country Club
- Par: 72
- Tour: PGA Tour
- Format: Stroke play
- Prize fund: US$160,000
- Month played: August
- Final year: 1970

Tournament record score
- Aggregate: 276 Bobby Nichols (1970)
- To par: −12 as above

Final champion
- (United States) Bobby Nichols
- Location in the United States Location in New Jersey

The Dow Jones Open Invitational was a golf tournament on the PGA Tour that was played for one year at the Upper Montclair Country Club in Clifton, New Jersey, an 18-hole, par-72 championship course. Another PGA Tour event — the Thunderbird Classic — had also been held there for part of its history in the 1960s.

== Winners ==
| Year | Winner | Score | To par | Margin of victory | Runner-up |
|---|---|---|---|---|---|
| 1970 | (United States) Bobby Nichols | 276 | −12 | 1 stroke | (United States) Labron Harris Jr. |
