= Bill Collins (golfer) =

American professional golfer (1928–2006)

Personal information
- Full name: William R. Collins
- Nationality: United States
- Born: September 23, 1928 Meyersdale, Pennsylvania, U.S.
- Died: April 8, 2006 (aged 77) Woodstock, Georgia, U.S.
- Height: 6 ft 4 in (1.93 m)
- Weight: 205 lb (93 kg; 14.6 st)

Career
- Sport: Golf
- Status: Professional
- Former tours: PGA Tour; Champions Tour
- Professional wins: 7

Number of wins by tour
- PGA Tour: 4
- PGA Tour Champions: 1
- Other: 2

Best results in major championships
- Masters Tournament: T7: 1961
- PGA Championship: T12: 1960
- U.S. Open: 7th: 1964
- The Open Championship: DNP

William R. Collins (September 23, 1928 – April 8, 2006) was an American professional golfer who played on the PGA Tour in the 1950s and 1960s and the Senior PGA Tour in the 1980s.

== Early life ==
Collins was born in Meyersdale, Pennsylvania. He grew up in Baltimore, Maryland.

== Professional career ==
Collins joined the PGA Tour in 1958 and won four events between 1959 and 1962. His first victory came at the 1959 Greater New Orleans Open Invitational by three strokes (280) over Jack Burke Jr. and Tom Nieporte. In 1960, Collins finished in a three-way tie for first at the end of regulation at the Insurance City Open, which he and Jack Fleck lost in a playoff to Arnold Palmer. His best finishes in major championships were T-7 at The Masters in 1961 and a 7th-place finish at the 1964 U.S. Open. He was a member of the victorious 1961 Ryder Cup team.

Collins was forced to quit the Tour after back surgery in 1963. In 1965, he took a club pro job at Brae Burn Country Club in Purchase, New York and remained there until December 1981. He joined the Senior PGA Tour in 1982 and won the Greater Syracuse Senior's Pro Golf Classic in his first full season.

== Death ==
Collins died in Woodstock, Georgia at the age of 77.

== Professional wins (7) ==
=== PGA Tour wins (4) ===
No.	Date	Tournament	Winning score	Margin of victory	Runner(s)-up
1	Mar 9, 1959	Greater New Orleans Open Invitational	−8 (68-72-70-70=280)	3 strokes	(United States) Jack Burke Jr., (United States) Tom Nieporte
2	May 2, 1960	Houston Classic	−8 (66-71-68-75=280)	Playoff	(United States) Arnold Palmer
3	May 22, 1960	Hot Springs Open Invitational	−13 (68-70-68-69=275)	3 strokes	(United States) Pete Cooper
4	Jul 8, 1962	Buick Open Invitational	−4 (70-71-71-72=284)	1 stroke	(United States) Dave Ragan

PGA Tour playoff record (1–3)

No.	Year	Tournament	Opponent(s)	Result
1	1960	Phoenix Open Invitational	(United States) Jack Fleck	Lost 18-hole playoff; Fleck: −3 (68), Collins: E (71)
2	1960	Houston Classic	(United States) Arnold Palmer	Won 18-hole playoff; Collins: −3 (69), Palmer: −1 (71)
3	1960	Insurance City Open Invitational	(United States) Jack Fleck, (United States) Arnold Palmer	Palmer won with birdie on third extra hole Collins eliminated by birdie on first hole
4	1962	Hot Springs Open Invitational	(Canada) Al Johnston	Lost to birdie on second extra hole

=== Other wins (2) ===
- 1956 Metropolitan PGA Championship
- 1975 Metropolitan PGA Championship

=== Senior PGA Tour wins (1) ===
No.	Date	Tournament	Winning score	Margin of victory	Runner-up
1	Aug 22, 1982	Greater Syracuse Senior's Pro Golf Classic	+1 (73-71-71-70=285)	1 stroke	(England) Guy Wolstenholme

== U.S. national team appearances ==
Professional

- Ryder Cup: 1961 (winners)
