= Jack Burke Jr. =

American professional golfer (1923–2024)

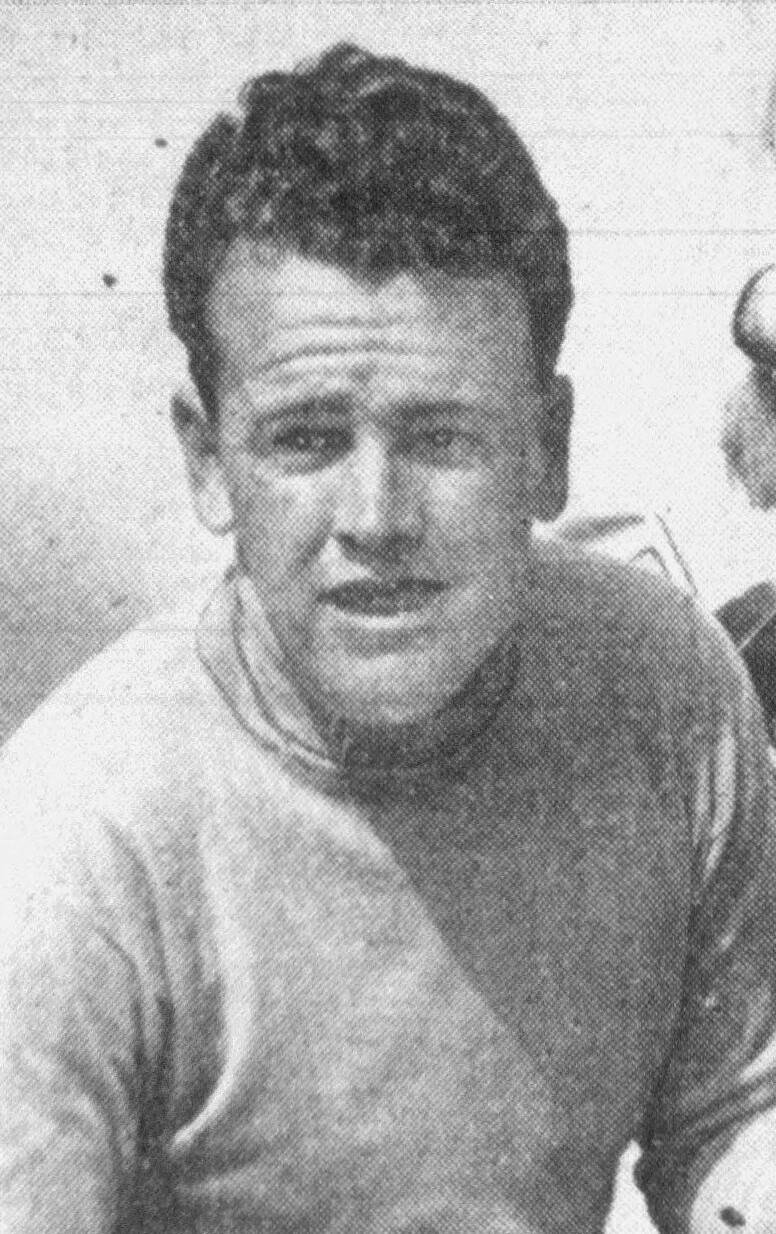
- Burke, circa 1950

Personal information
- Full name: John Joseph Burke Jr.
- Nickname: Jackie
- Nationality: United States
- Born: January 29, 1923 Fort Worth, Texas, U.S.
- Died: January 19, 2024 (aged 100) Houston, Texas, U.S.
- Height: 5 ft 7 in (170 cm)
- Weight: 165 lb (75 kg; 11.8 st)

Career
- Sport: Golf
- Turned professional: 1941
- Former tour: PGA Tour
- Professional wins: 19

Number of wins by tour
- PGA Tour: 16
- Other: 3

Best results in major championships (wins: 2)
- Masters Tournament: Won: 1956
- PGA Championship: Won: 1956
- U.S. Open: T10: 1955
- The Open Championship: DNP

Achievements and awards
- World Golf Hall of Fame: 2000 (member page)
- Vardon Trophy: 1952
- PGA Player of the Year: 1956
- PGA Tour Lifetime Achievement Award: 2003
- Bob Jones Award: 2004

John Joseph Burke Jr. (January 29, 1923 – January 19, 2024) was an American professional golfer who was most prominent in the 1950s. The son of a professional golfer, Jack Burke Sr., he won two major titles, both in 1956, the Masters and PGA Championship, and is a member of the World Golf Hall of Fame.

Burke won 16 PGA Tour events between 1950 and 1963. He won four times in 1950 and five times in 1952, including four in consecutive weeks in February and March. He had not won since 1953 when he won the 1956 Masters, coming from eight strokes behind in the final round to overtake leader Ken Venturi, an amateur, who took 80. Later in 1956 he won the PGA Championship, beating Ted Kroll 3&2 in the final. His last tour win came in 1963, just before his 40th birthday. Burke was on five successive American Ryder Cup teams from 1951 to 1959, serving as playing captain in 1957, when Great Britain won for the first time since 1933, and as the non-playing captain in 1973. He had a successful playing record, winning 7 of his 8 matches, only losing his singles match in 1957.

In 1957, Burke and Jimmy Demaret founded Champions Golf Club in Houston. The club has hosted a number of important events including the 1967 Ryder Cup and the 1969 U.S. Open.

== Early life ==
Born in Fort Worth, Texas, Burke started playing golf at the age of seven. His father, Jack Burke Sr., was the club professional at Houston's River Oaks Country Club until his sudden death in 1943. He was a runner-up at the U.S. Open in 1920. The younger Burke graduated from St. Thomas High School in Houston in 1940. He attended Rice University in 1941. While still an amateur he qualified for the 1941 U.S. Open, the first to be played in Texas, but missed the cut. In 1942 he became the professional at Galveston Country Club. From 1942 to 1946 he served in the U.S. Marine Corps and was stationed at Marine Corps Air Station Miramar where he taught combat skills to Marines headed overseas for World War II.

== Golf career ==
After the war, Burke resumed his golf career after first considering work in the oil fields of Texas. His first job was as a teaching professional at Hollywood Golf Club in Deal, New Jersey, which was followed by a position as an assistant at Winged Foot Golf Club, where he was mentored by Claude Harmon. From early 1948 he was the club professional at Metropolis Country Club in White Plains, New York.

In January 1949, Burke finished tied for the third place in the Long Beach Open, having led after 3 rounds. In September he won the Metropolitan Open at his home club, finishing six strokes ahead of Gene Sarazen. Burke started 1950 with a third-place finish in the Los Angeles Open. In the following days he was a joint winner in the Bing Crosby Pro-Am, one of four players who finished tied. In February he won his first outright tour event, the Rio Grande Valley Open and had further wins in March and July, finishing fifth in the PGA tour money list. He did not win in 1951 but was runner-up five times and again finished fifth in the money list. In February and March 1952 Burke won four successive tournaments in four weeks. Three of these he won by six or more strokes with the other being won in a three-way playoff. He had his fifth win of the season in December. In addition he lost two 18-hole playoffs during the year and finished second in the Masters. Burke won the Vardon Trophy for the lowest scoring average in 1952, finishing third in the money list.

Burke won a further PGA tour event in 1953 but only finished 19th in the money list. He did not win in 1954 but he finished second in the Vardon Trophy standings and second in the money list, helped by $7,500 won for a runner-up finish in the big money World Championship of Golf. In 1955 he dropped to 15th in the money list. He reach the quarterfinals of 1955 PGA Championship, losing a nine-hour, 40-hole quarterfinal match to Cary Middlecoff.

Burke won two majors in 1956, the Masters and the PGA Championship. In his Masters victory, Burke came from eight strokes behind in the final round to overtake Ken Venturi, then an amateur. After three rounds Venturi led by four strokes from Cary Middlecoff with the rest of the field at least seven shots behind. After 8 holes of the final round Venturi had a six-stroke lead over Middlecoff and Burke. Middlecoff took a double bogey at the 17th hole, his third of the round, and finished in third place. Burke completed the last 10 holes in level par while Venturi had seven bogeys, giving Burke a one-shot victory over Venturi with Middlecoff a further shot behind. For the 1956 PGA Championship the format had been changed with 128 players competing in a pure matchplay format, players qualifying through a mixture of exemptions and sectional qualifying. Previously there had been 36 holes of strokeplay followed by matchplay for the leading 64. Burke won 7 matches, defeating Leon Pounders, Bill Collins, Fred Haas, Chandler Harper and Fred Hawkins in 18 holes matches to reach the 36-hole semifinals. In his semifinal against Ed Furgol, Burke was 5-down after 14 holes of the morning round but recovered to win at the 37th hole, to meet Ted Kroll in the final. Kroll was 3-up after 19 holes but Burke made 5 birdies in 6 holes from the 4th hole to go 2-up and eventually won 3&2. He was selected PGA Player of the Year in 1956, finishing 5th in the money list.

After 1956, Burke had less success although he won further PGA Tour events in 1958, 1959, 1961 and 1963 bringing his total to 16 over his career. In 1958, he finished 14th in the tour money list, his best season after 1956.

Burke was in five successive American Ryder Cup teams from 1951 to 1959. He was the playing captain in 1957 and the non-playing captain in 1973. He had a successful playing record, winning his first 7 matches; two matches in 1951, 1953 and 1955, and winning in the foursomes in 1957, before losing to Peter Mills in the singles. Mills won 5 holes in a row from the 6th to the 10th to be 5 up, finished the morning round 5 ahead and eventually won the match 5&3. Great Britain won 6 of the 8 singles and halved another to win the Ryder Cup for the first time since 1933. Burke was in the 1959 Ryder Cup team but had a hand injury and was not selected for any matches.

Burke partnered with Jimmy Demaret to found Champions Golf Club in Houston in 1957. The 36-hole facility hosted a PGA Tour event from 1966 to 1971, today's Shell Houston Open. As well, the club hosted the 1967 Ryder Cup, the 1969 U.S. Open, the 1993 U.S. Amateur, and the PGA Tour Championship in 1990, 1997, 1999, 2001, and 2003. Burke was the fifth recipient of the PGA Tour Lifetime Achievement Award in 2003, and was inducted into the World Golf Hall of Fame in 2000.

Burke shares his permanent locker at Augusta National Golf Club, home of The Masters, with Tiger Woods. Both kept their green jackets in the locker, awarded to the winners of the tournament. Burke coached several current PGA Tour stars, including Phil Mickelson, in putting.

== Personal life ==
Burke was first married to Ielene Lang in 1952. His second wife was Robin Moran, an amateur golfer. She was runner-up in the 1997 U.S. Women's Amateur, played in the 1998 Curtis Cup and was the captain of the American 2016 Curtis Cup team. She was inducted into the Texas Golf Hall of Fame in 2016. They ran the Champions Golf Club together.

Burke became a centenarian on January 29, 2023, and also became the first known major winner to turn 100.

=== Death ===
Burke died on January 19, 2024, 10 days before what would have been his 101st birthday. At the time of his death in 2024, Burke was the oldest living major golf champion.

== Professional wins (19) ==
=== PGA Tour wins (16) ===
Legend
Major championships (2)
Other PGA Tour (14)

No.	Date	Tournament	Winning score	Margin of victory	Runner(s)-up
1	Jan 15, 1950	Bing Crosby Pro-Am	−2 (75-67-72=214)	Shared title with (United States) Dave Douglas, (United States) Smiley Quick and (United States) Sam Snead	
2	Feb 19, 1950	Rio Grande Valley Open	−20 (66-67-66-65=264)	2 strokes	(United States) Skip Alexander
3	Mar 5, 1950	St. Petersburg Open	−12 (67-67-69-69=272)	1 stroke	(United States) Chick Harbert
4	Jul 30, 1950	Sioux City Open	−20 (65-68-65-70=268)	3 strokes	(United States) Skip Alexander
5	Feb 17, 1952	Texas Open	−24 (67-65-64-64=260)	6 strokes	(United States) Doug Ford
6	Feb 24, 1952	Houston Open	−11 (69-67-69-72=277)	6 strokes	(United States) Frank Stranahan (a)
7	Mar 3, 1952	Baton Rouge Open	−7 (68-70-72-71=281)	Playoff	(United States) Tommy Bolt, (United States) Bill Nary
8	Mar 9, 1952	St. Petersburg Open (2)	−22 (66-69-65-66=266)	8 strokes	(United States) Al Besselink
9	Dec 14, 1952	Miami Open	−7 (69-66-69-69=273)	Playoff	(United States) Dick Mayer
10	Jun 21, 1953	Inverness Invitational	−12 (68-64-69-71=272)	2 strokes	(United States) Fred Haas
11	Apr 8, 1956	Masters Tournament	+1 (72-71-75-71=289)	1 stroke	(United States) Ken Venturi (a)
12	Jul 24, 1956	PGA Championship	3 and 2		(United States) Ted Kroll
13	Jul 13, 1958	Insurance City Open Invitational	−16 (63-67-69-69=268)	3 strokes	(United States) Dow Finsterwald, (United States) Art Wall Jr.
14	Apr 20, 1959	Houston Classic (2)	−11 (69-66-72-70=277)	Playoff	(United States) Julius Boros
15	Jul 4, 1961	Buick Open Invitational	−4 (71-71-72-70=284)	Playoff	(United States) Billy Casper, (United States) Johnny Pott
16	Jan 27, 1963	Lucky International Open	−8 (70-69-70-67=276)	3 strokes	(United States) Don January

PGA Tour playoff record (4–4)

No.	Year	Tournament	Opponent(s)	Result
1	1952	Los Angeles Open	(United States) Tommy Bolt, (United States) Dutch Harrison	Bolt won 18-hole playoff; Bolt: −2 (69), Burke: E (71), Harrison: +3 (74)
2	1952	Baton Rouge Open	(United States) Tommy Bolt, (United States) Bill Nary	Won with birdie on second extra hole Bolt eliminated by par on first hole after 18-hole playoff; Burke: −2 (70), Bolt: −2 (70), Nary: −2 (70)
3	1952	Kansas City Open	(United States) Cary Middlecoff	Lost 18-hole playoff; Middlecoff: −6 (66), Burke: E (72)
4	1952	Miami Open	(United States) Dick Mayer	Won with birdie on fifth extra hole
5	1955	Rubber City Open	(United States) Jackson Bradley, (United States) Doug Ford, (United States) Henry Ransom	Ransom won with birdie on first extra hole
6	1958	Eastern Open Invitational	(United States) Bob Rosburg, (United States) Art Wall Jr.	Wall won with birdie on first extra hole
7	1959	Houston Classic	(United States) Julius Boros	Won 18-hole playoff; Burke: −8 (64), Boros: −3 (69)
8	1961	Buick Open Invitational	(United States) Billy Casper, (United States) Johnny Pott	Won 18-hole playoff; Burke: −1 (71), Casper: +2 (74), Pott: +2 (74)

=== Other wins (3) ===
Note: This list may be incomplete.

- 1949 Metropolitan Open
- 1958 Yomiuri Pro Championship
- 1967 Texas State Open

== Major championships ==
=== Wins (2) ===
Year	Championship	54 holes	Winning score	Margin	Runner-up
1956	Masters Tournament	8 shot deficit	+1 (72-71-75-71=289)	1 stroke	(United States) Ken Venturi
1956	PGA Championship	n/a	3 & 2		(United States) Ted Kroll

=== Results timeline ===
Tournament	1941	1942	1943	1944	1945	1946	1947	1948	1949
Masters Tournament			NT	NT	NT				
U.S. Open	CUT	NT	NT	NT	NT				T27
PGA Championship			NT						R64

Tournament	1950	1951	1952	1953	1954	1955	1956	1957	1958	1959
Masters Tournament	WD	11	2	8	T6	T13	1	T7	CUT	T34
U.S. Open	CUT		T41	T14	T15	T10	CUT	WD		
PGA Championship		QF	R32		R64	QF	1	R64	4	T17

Tournament	1960	1961	1962	1963	1964	1965	1966	1967	1968	1969
Masters Tournament	T11	T7	T39	CUT	CUT	CUT	T44	T53	CUT	T24
U.S. Open			CUT	T21		CUT				
PGA Championship	T29	T52	T17	T34	T44	T8	T66	T42		T69

Tournament	1970	1971	1972	1973	1974
Masters Tournament	CUT				CUT
U.S. Open					
PGA Championship	T45	CUT	67	T56	

Note: Burke never played in The Open Championship.

Win
Top 10
Did not play

CUT = missed the halfway cut
WD = withdrew
R64, R32, R16, QF, SF = Round in which player lost in PGA Championship match play
"T" indicates a tie for a place.

=== Summary ===
Tournament	Wins	2nd	3rd	Top-5	Top-10	Top-25	Events	Cuts made
Masters Tournament	1	1	0	2	6	10	22	14
U.S. Open	0	0	0	0	1	4	12	6
The Open Championship	0	0	0	0	0	0	0	0
PGA Championship	1	0	0	4	5	7	22	21
Totals	2	1	0	6	12	21	56	41

- Most consecutive cuts made – 14 (1951 Masters – 1956 Masters)
- Longest streak of top-10s – 3 (1955 U.S. Open – 1956 Masters)

== U.S. national team appearances ==
- Ryder Cup: 1951 (winners), 1953 (winners), 1955 (winners), 1957 (playing captain), 1959 (winners), 1973 (winners, non-playing captain)
- Hopkins Trophy: 1952 (winners), 1953 (winners), 1955 (winners)

== See also ==
- List of golfers with most PGA Tour wins
- List of longest PGA Tour win streaks
