= Blue Hill Country Club =

Country club in Canton, Massachusetts

Coordinates: 42°11′36″N 71°08′13″W

Blue Hill Country Club is a private country club located in Canton, Massachusetts established in 1925. It has hosted professional tournaments on both the PGA Tour and LPGA Tour, including the PGA Championship, a major championship on the PGA Tour.

It includes two courses: the 18-hole Championship Course, designed in 1925 by Eugene "Skip" Wogan and the 9-hole Challenger Course, designed in 1961 by Wogan's son Phil. Both courses were restored in 2003 by Ron Prichard who specializes in Donald Ross golf course restorations.

The course is open to private and charity outings on Mondays between May and October.

== Courses ==
=== Challenger Course ===
The Challenger Course is a 9-hole course designed in 1961. It has three sets of tees, and plays to 2,954 yards from the back, or black, tees. (All measurements are in yards)

Blue Hill Country Club Challenger Course
Tee	Rating/Slope	1	2	3	4	5	6	7	8	9	Out	10	11	12	13	14	15	16	17	18	In	Total
Black	69.0 / 127	175	506	302	452	159	453	333	203	371	2954
Gold	68.0/ 120	165	490	292	439	141	426	324	197	366	2840
Par		3	5	4	5	3	4	4	3	4	35
SI		9	1	5	3	8	2	6	7	4
Red	68.2 / 122	117	340	281	407	96	399	316	183	261	2400
Par		3	4	4	5	3	4	4	3	4	34
SI		8	2	5	1	9	3	4	7	6

=== Champion Course ===
The Champion Course is an 18-hole course designed in 1925 and restored in 2003. It has four sets of tees and plays to 6,646 yards from the back, or black, tees. (All measurements are in yards)

Blue Hill Country Club Champion Course
Tee	Rating/Slope	1	2	3	4	5	6	7	8	9	Out	10	11	12	13	14	15	16	17	18	In	Total
Black	73.0 / 130	434	431	432	198	389	299	132	517	458	3290	410	418	533	229	407	357	182	338	482	3356	6646
Gold	71.5 / 126	430	405	411	181	383	278	127	505	444	3164	389	402	517	216	394	325	164	338	467	3212	6376
Blue	67.7 / 121	417	364	398	171	307	258	122	392	325	2999	351	387	487	182	376	317	149	332	446	3027	6026
Par		4	4	4	3	4	4	3	5	5	36	4	4	5	3	4	4	3	4	5	36	72
SI		5	1	7	15	9	13	17	3	11		4	10	2	14	6	12	18	16	8
Red	71.8 / 127	414	323	386	149	297	249	94	388	319	2642	323	322	429	171	330	308	132	320	401	2736	5378
Par		5	4	4	3	4	4	3	5	4	36	4	4	5	3	4	4	3	4	5	36	72
SI		9	5	1	15	11	13	17	3	7		14	12	2	16	10	4	18	8	6

note: the official course scorecards do not designate handicaps as "men's" or "women's."

== Tournaments held ==
- 1956 PGA Championship, major championship
- 1991-97 PING/Welch's Championship, LPGA Tour event
