= 1961 PGA Tour =

Golf tour season

1961 PGA Tour season
- Duration: January 6, 1961 – December 10, 1961
- Number of official events: 48
- Most wins: (United States) Arnold Palmer (6)
- Money list: (South Africa) Gary Player
- PGA Player of the Year: (United States) Jerry Barber

The 1961 PGA Tour was the 46th season of the PGA Tour, the main professional golf tour in the United States.

== Schedule ==
The following table lists official events during the 1961 season.

Date	Tournament	Location	Purse (US$)	Winner (Note: The number in parentheses after each winner's name is the number of PGA Tour events they had won up to and including that tournament. This information is only shown for PGA Tour members.)	Notes
Jan 9	Los Angeles Open	California	45,000	(United States) Bob Goalby (3)	
Jan 15	San Diego Open Invitational	California	22,500	(United States) Arnold Palmer (22)	
Jan 22	Bing Crosby National Pro-Am	California	50,000	(United States) Bob Rosburg (5)	Pro-Am
Jan 29	Lucky International Open	California	57,000	(South Africa) Gary Player (3)	New tournament
Feb 5	Palm Springs Golf Classic	California	52,000	(United States) Billy Maxwell (5)	Pro-Am
Feb 13	Phoenix Open Invitational	Arizona	30,000	(United States) Arnold Palmer (23)	
Feb 19	Home of the Sun Open	Arizona	20,000	(United States) Dave Hill (1)	
Feb 26	Baton Rouge Open Invitational	Louisiana	20,000	(United States) Arnold Palmer (24)	
Mar 5	Greater New Orleans Open Invitational	Louisiana	30,000	(United States) Doug Sanders (4)	
Mar 12	Pensacola Open Invitational	Florida	20,000	(United States) Tommy Bolt (15)	
Mar 19	St. Petersburg Open Invitational	Florida	20,000	(United States) Bob Goalby (4)	
Mar 26	Sunshine Open Invitational	Florida	25,000	(South Africa) Gary Player (4)	New tournament
Apr 2	Azalea Open	North Carolina	12,000	(United States) Jerry Barber (5)	
Apr 10	Masters Tournament	Georgia	110,000	(South Africa) Gary Player (5)	Major championship
Apr 16	Greater Greensboro Open	North Carolina	22,500	(United States) Mike Souchak (13)	
Apr 24	Houston Classic	Texas	40,000	(United States) Jay Hebert (6)	
Apr 30	Texas Open Invitational	Texas	30,000	(United States) Arnold Palmer (25)	
May 7	Tournament of Champions	Nevada	52,000	(United States) Sam Snead (81)	Winners-only event
May 7	Waco Turner Open	Oklahoma	20,000	(United States) Butch Baird (1)	New tournament Alternate event
May 14	Colonial National Invitation	Texas	40,000	(United States) Doug Sanders (5)	Invitational
May 21	Hot Springs Open Invitational	Arkansas	20,000	(United States) Doug Sanders (6)	
May 28	500 Festival Open Invitation	Indiana	50,000	(United States) Doug Ford (16)	
Jun 4	Memphis Open Invitational	Tennessee	30,000	(United States) Cary Middlecoff (39)	
Jun 17	U.S. Open	Michigan	60,000	(United States) Gene Littler (17)	Major championship
Jun 25	Western Open	Michigan	55,000	(United States) Arnold Palmer (26)	
Jul 3	Buick Open Invitational	Michigan	50,000	(United States) Jack Burke Jr. (15)	
Jul 9	St. Paul Open Invitational	Minnesota	30,000	(United States) Don January (3)	
Jul 15	The Open Championship	England	£8,500	(United States) Arnold Palmer (27)	Major championship (Note: Unofficial money event at the time, but retrospectively counted as an official win.)
Jul 15	Canadian Open	Canada	30,000	(United States) Jacky Cupit (1)	
Jul 23	Milwaukee Open Invitational	Wisconsin	30,000	(Australia) Bruce Crampton (1)	
Jul 31	PGA Championship	Illinois	65,000	(United States) Jerry Barber (6)	Major championship
Aug 6	Eastern Open Invitational	Maryland	35,000	(United States) Doug Sanders (7)	
Aug 13	Insurance City Open Invitational	Connecticut	30,000	(United States) Billy Maxwell (6)	
Aug 20	Carling Open Invitational	Maryland	35,000	(United States) Gay Brewer (1)	
Aug 27	American Golf Classic	Ohio	50,000	(United States) Jay Hebert (7)	New tournament
Sep 4	Dallas Open Invitational	Texas	30,000	(United States) Earl Stewart (3)	
Sep 10	Denver Open Invitational	Colorado	25,000	(United States) Dave Hill (2)	
Sep 17	Greater Seattle Open Invitational	Washington	25,000	(United States) Dave Marr (1)	
Sep 24	Portland Open Invitational	Oregon	25,000	(United States) Billy Casper (14)	
Oct 1	Bakersfield Open	California	25,000	(United States) Jack Fleck (3)	New tournament
Oct 15	Ontario Open	California	20,000	(United States) Eric Monti (3)	New tournament
Oct 22	Orange County Open Invitational	California	17,500	(United States) Bob McCallister (1)	
Nov 5	Almaden Open Invitational	California	12,000	(Australia) Jim Ferrier (18)	New to PGA Tour
Nov 12	Beaumont Open Invitational	Texas	20,000	(United States) Joe Campbell (1)	New tournament
Nov 19	Cajun Classic Open Invitational	Louisiana	15,000	(United States) Doug Sanders (8)	
Nov 26	Mobile Sertoma Open Invitational	Alabama	15,000	(United States) Gay Brewer (2)	
Dec 3	West Palm Beach Open Invitational	Florida	20,000	(United States) Gay Brewer (3)	
Dec 10	Coral Gables Open Invitational	Florida]	20,000	(Canada) George Knudson (1)	

=== Unofficial events ===
The following events were sanctioned by the PGA Tour, but did not carry official money, nor were wins official.

Date	Tournament	Location	Purse ($)	Winner(s)	Notes
Oct 14	Ryder Cup	England	n/a	Team USA	Team event
Jun 4	Canada Cup	Puerto Rico	6,300	(United States) Jimmy Demaret and (United States) Sam Snead	Team event
Jun 4	Canada Cup Individual Trophy	Puerto Rico	6,300	(United States) Sam Snead	

== Money list ==
The money list was based on prize money won during the season, calculated in U.S. dollars.

Position	Player	Prize money ($)
1	(South Africa) Gary Player	64,540
2	(United States) Arnold Palmer	61,091
3	(United States) Doug Sanders	57,428
4	(United States) Billy Casper	37,767
5	(United States) Jay Hebert	35,583
6	(United States) Johnny Pott	33,268
7	(United States) Gay Brewer	31,150
8	(United States) Bob Goalby	30,919
9	(United States) Gene Littler	29,246
10	(United States) Billy Maxwell	28,335

== Awards ==
Award	Winner	Ref.
PGA Player of the Year	(United States) Jerry Barber	
Scoring leader (Vardon Trophy)	(United States) Arnold Palmer	
