= Bobby Nichols =

American professional golfer (born 1936)

Personal information
- Full name: Robert Herman Nichols
- Nationality: United States
- Born: April 14, 1936 (age 90) Louisville, Kentucky, U.S.
- Height: 6 ft 2 in (188 cm)
- Weight: 190 lb (86 kg)

Career
- Sport: Golf
- College: Texas A&M University
- Turned professional: 1960
- Former tours: PGA Tour; Champions Tour
- Professional wins: 15

Number of wins by tour
- PGA Tour: 12
- PGA Tour Champions: 1
- Other: 2

Best results in major championships (wins: 1)
- Masters Tournament: 2nd: 1967
- PGA Championship: Won: 1964
- U.S. Open: T3: 1962
- The Open Championship: DNP

Robert Herman Nichols (born April 14, 1936) is an American professional golfer, best known for winning the PGA Championship in 1964.

== Early life ==
In 1936, Nichols was born and raised in Louisville, Kentucky. He attended St. Xavier High School. While in high school, Nichols and several other youths were involved in an automobile accident resulting from a 100 mph (160 km/h) joy ride. He suffered serious injuries including a broken pelvis, concussion, back and internal injuries, and was hospitalized 96 days. His legs were also paralyzed for about two weeks, but he was able to regain full use of his legs after intensive physical therapy.

Nichols later played on the Aggies golf team at the Agricultural & Mechanical College of Texas (later renamed Texas A&M University) in the Southwest Conference.

== Professional career ==
In 1960, Nichols began playing on the PGA Tour and recorded 12 victories, one of which, the PGA National Team Championship, was not fully recognized until 2012. He was a member of the Ryder Cup team in 1967, and his best year on tour was 1974 when he won twice, earned $124,747 and finished 14th on the money list. Nichols, Jerry Heard, and Lee Trevino were struck by lightning at the Western Open on Friday, June 27, 1975. All three men came back to play professional golf. Unfortunately Nichols – who was 39 at the time and still playing consistently well – as the PGA Tour's Media Guide noted several years later "has not played with the same effectiveness since" [meaning after the strike]. His results on tour after mid-1975 until he joined what was then called the Senior Tour in 1986 bear that out. While Trevino won many more times on the PGA Tour after being hit by lightning (including a major championship) and Heard also won again on tour in 1978, Nichols never did. The closest he came to another PGA Tour win was a team event played in 1976 with Gay Brewer, the 1976 Walt Disney World National Team Championship. The team of Nichols and Brewer lost in a playoff to the team of Woody Blackburn and Billy Kratzert.

Nichols has had 12 holes-in-one in his professional career.

The 1964 PGA Championship was played at the Columbus Country Club in Columbus, Ohio. Nichols won with a 271 total, three shots ahead of runners-up Arnold Palmer and defending champion Jack Nicklaus, playing in his hometown. This was a record low score for the PGA Championship and it stood for 30 years, until broken by Nick Price's 269 in 1994. Nichols was the first wire-to-wire winner since the PGA Championship switched format from match play to stroke play in 1958. He came close to winning a second major at the Masters in 1967, finishing second to his lifelong friend, Gay Brewer.

After turning 50 in 1986, Nichols played on the Senior PGA Tour, now the Champions Tour. He had numerous top-10 finishes but only one victory – the Southwestern Bell Classic in 1989, when he defeated Orville Moody on the third hole of a playoff.

Bobby Nichols Golf Course is a 9-hole municipal course that is part of Waverly Park in Louisville, southwest of downtown. (38.126°N 85.838°W) The back tees are set at 6,970 yards (6,370 m) with a rating of 72.0 and a slope of 130.

== Professional wins (15) ==
=== PGA Tour wins (12) ===
Legend
Major championships (1)
Other PGA Tour (11)

No.	Date	Tournament	Winning score	Margin of victory	Runner(s)-up
1	Mar 19, 1962	St. Petersburg Open Invitational	−16 (71-67-70-64=272)	2 strokes	(United States) Frank Boynton
2	Apr 23, 1962	Houston Classic	−2 (68-69-71-70=278)	Playoff	(United States) Jack Nicklaus, (United States) Dan Sikes
3	Sep 15, 1963	Seattle Open Invitational	−16 (66-68-68-70=272)	2 strokes	(United States) Raymond Floyd, (Canada) Stan Leonard
4	Jul 19, 1964	PGA Championship	−9 (64-71-69-67=271)	3 strokes	(United States) Jack Nicklaus, (United States) Arnold Palmer
5	Aug 30, 1964	Carling World Open	−2 (72-68-66-72=278)	1 stroke	(United States) Arnold Palmer
6	Apr 18, 1965	Houston Classic (2)	−11 (67-69-67-70=273)	1 stroke	(Australia) Bruce Devlin, (United States) Chi-Chi Rodríguez
7	Jul 17, 1966	Minnesota Golf Classic	−14 (67-67-66-70=270)	1 stroke	(United States) John Schlee
8	Sep 22, 1968	PGA National Team Championship (with (United States) George Archer)	−22 (65-66-69-65=265)	2 strokes	(United States) Monty Kaser and (United States) Rives McBee
9	Aug 30, 1970	Dow Jones Open Invitational	−12 (68-70-69-69=276)	1 stroke	(United States) Labron Harris Jr.
10	Aug 5, 1973	Westchester Classic	−16 (70-67-70-65=272)	Playoff	(United States) Bob Murphy
11	Jan 27, 1974	Andy Williams-San Diego Open Invitational	−13 (69-69-68-69=275)	1 stroke	(United States) Rod Curl, (United States) Gene Littler
12	Jul 28, 1974	Canadian Open	−10 (67-67-68-68=270)	4 strokes	(United States) John Schlee, (United States) Larry Ziegler

PGA Tour playoff record (2–3)

No.	Year	Tournament	Opponent(s)	Result
1	1961	Ontario Open	(United States) George Bayer, (United States) Eric Monti	Monti won with birdie on second extra hole
2	1962	Houston Classic	(United States) Jack Nicklaus, (United States) Dan Sikes	Won with eagle on first extra hole after 18 hole playoff; Nichols: +1 (71), Sikes: +1 (71), Nicklaus: +6 (76)
3	1973	Westchester Classic	(United States) Bob Murphy	Won with birdie on second extra hole
4	1975	Andy Williams-San Diego Open Invitational	(United States) Raymond Floyd, (United States) J. C. Snead	Snead won with birdie on fourth extra hole Nichols eliminated by par on first hole
5	1976	Walt Disney World National Team Championship (with (United States) Gay Brewer)	(United States) Woody Blackburn and (United States) Billy Kratzert	Lost to birdie on third extra hole

=== Senior PGA Tour wins (1) ===
No.	Date	Tournament	Winning score	Margin of victory	Runner-up
1	May 28, 1989	Southwestern Bell Classic	−7 (69-69-71=209)	Playoff	(United States) Orville Moody

Senior PGA Tour playoff record (1–1)

No.	Year	Tournament	Opponent(s)	Result
1	1988	Senior Players Reunion Pro-Am	(New Zealand) Bob Charles, (United States) Don Massengale, (United States) Orville Moody	Moody won with birdie on first extra hole
2	1989	Southwestern Bell Classic	(United States) Orville Moody	Won with birdie on third extra hole

=== Other senior wins (2) ===
- 1986 Showdown Classic (with Curt Byrum)
- 2007 Liberty Mutual Legends of Golf - Demaret Division (with Butch Baird)

== Major championships ==
=== Wins (1) ===
Year	Championship	54 holes	Winning score	Margin	Runners-up
1964	PGA Championship	1 shot lead	−9 (64-71-69-67=271)	3 strokes	(United States) Jack Nicklaus, (United States) Arnold Palmer

=== Results timeline ===
Tournament	1958	1959
Masters Tournament		
U.S. Open	T52	
PGA Championship		

Tournament	1960	1961	1962	1963	1964	1965	1966	1967	1968	1969
Masters Tournament				T24	T25	T35	T22	2	T30	T29
U.S. Open			T3	T14	T14	CUT	7	T23	4	T31
PGA Championship			6	T23	1	T54	CUT	T14	T57	T44

Tournament	1970	1971	1972	1973	1974	1975	1976	1977	1978	1979
Masters Tournament			T31	T24	T7	T4	CUT			
U.S. Open	T46	T9	T11	T20	T49	CUT	CUT		52	T25
PGA Championship	T26	T46	T62	T51	T39	T33	CUT	T51	T19	CUT

Tournament	1980	1981	1982	1983	1984	1985
Masters Tournament						
U.S. Open	CUT	T53	CUT	CUT		
PGA Championship	CUT	CUT	T34	T36	CUT	T40

Note: Nichols never played in The Open Championship.

Win
Top 10
Did not play

CUT = missed the halfway cut
"T" indicates a tie for a place.

=== Summary ===
Tournament	Wins	2nd	3rd	Top-5	Top-10	Top-25	Events	Cuts made
Masters Tournament	0	1	0	2	3	7	12	11
U.S. Open	0	0	1	2	4	10	22	16
The Open Championship	0	0	0	0	0	0	0	0
PGA Championship	1	0	0	1	2	5	24	18
Totals	1	1	1	5	9	22	58	45

- Most consecutive cuts made – 23 (1967 Masters – 1975 Masters)
- Longest streak of top-10s – 2 (1962 U.S. Open – 1962 PGA)

== U.S. national team appearances ==
Professional

- Ryder Cup: 1967 (winners)

== See also ==
- List of golfers with most PGA Tour wins
- List of men's major championships winning golfers
