= Aronimink Golf Club =

Country club in Pennsylvania, United States

- Location in the United States Location in Pennsylvania
- 40°00′40″N 75°24′32″W

Club information
- Location: Newtown Square, Pennsylvania, U.S.
- Elevation: 450 feet (140 m) AMSL
- Established: 1896; 130 years ago
- Type: Private
- Total holes: 18
- Tournaments: PGA Championship (1962, 2026); U.S. Amateur (1977); U.S. Junior Amateur (1997); Senior PGA Championship (2003); AT&T National (2010, 2011); BMW Championship (2018); Women's PGA Championship (2020)
- Greens: Bentgrass
- Fairways: Bentgrass
- Website: aronimink.org
- Designed by: Donald Ross; Ron Prichard (2003 renovation); Gil Hanse & Jim Wagner (2018 renovation)
- Par: 70
- Length: 7,237 yards (6,618 m)
- Course rating: 75.5
- Slope rating: 138
- Course record: 62 Nick Watney (2011); 62 Tiger Woods (2018); 62 Rory McIlroy (2018); 62 Kevin Na (2018); 62 Tommy Fleetwood (2018×2)

Aronimink Golf Club is a private country club in the eastern United States, located in Newtown Square, Pennsylvania, a suburb west of Philadelphia. Its championship layout is consistently rated among the nation's top golf courses. Aronimink is currently ranked 78th in Golf Digest's "Greatest Courses," 44th in "Toughest Courses" and 55th in Golfweek's "Classic Courses." In 2010, Aronimink was ranked fourth among the toughest courses on the PGA Tour by Links magazine.

The club has been host to multiple USGA and PGA championships in its history. In addition, Aronimink has indoor and outdoor tennis and paddle courts, trap shooting, three swimming pools, a fitness center and a classic Tudor clubhouse with multiple dining options.

== History ==
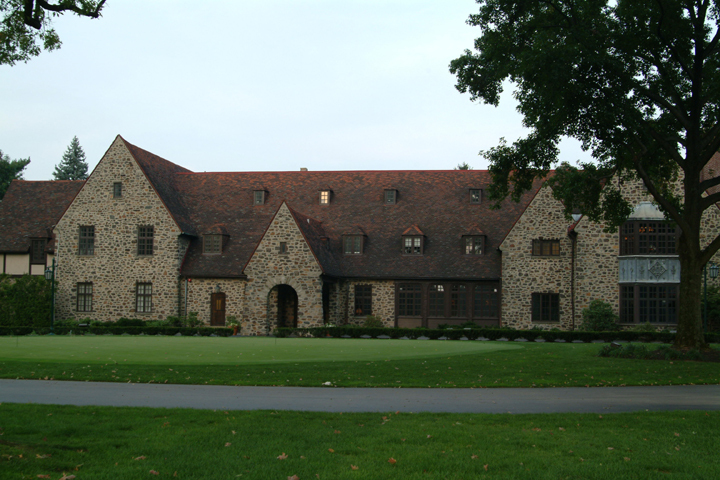
Aronimink Clubhouse in 2006

The club's roots can be traced to 1896 when the Royal and Ancient game made its way to America and the Belmont Golf Association (BGA), the forerunner of the Aronimink Golf Club, spun off from the Belmont Cricket Club. A year later, the Belmont Golf Association teamed up with Philadelphia Country Club, Merion Cricket Club and Philadelphia Cricket Club to form the Golf Association of Philadelphia, the first sectional golf association in the United States. By 1897 the BGA had a full nine holes in play at 52nd Street and Chester Avenue, its first location, in what is today Southwest Philadelphia. Playing to a length of 3,069 yards, par for the course was established at 36½. In that same year, the BGA was the first and only founding club to host its own championship. The tournament was won by Hugh Wilson, who designed Merion's golf courses.

History has it that Aronimink was named after the chief of the Lenape tribe who once occupied the small farmhouse being used as the original clubhouse. From inception to the mid-1920s, as the City of Philadelphia continued to expand, Aronimink operated from three different sites. Finally, in 1926 the club sold its Drexel Hill location and purchased a large 300-acre (1.2 km^{2}) tract in Newtown Square, 15 miles (24 km) from the center of Philadelphia.

Scottish-born Donald Ross, a golf course architect, was commissioned to design the new course, which opened for play on Memorial Day in 1928. The greens, fairways and hazards of his championship course design are the same today as they were in 1928. The Club's British-inspired clubhouse was designed by architects Charles Barton Keen and Franklin D. Edmonds, a member of the club.

Aronimink has been home to many accomplished golfers in its history. The first American-born winner of the U.S. Open, John McDermott, was an Aronimink caddie who learned to play golf from Aronimink's longtime head golf professional, Walter Reynolds. Notable members from the modern era of golf include: Gary Player (an honorary member since 2003), Sean O'Hair (PGA professional and home-town favorite) and Jay Sigel (the distinguished amateur and senior professional golfer). Currently, Aronimink's head golf professional is Jeff Kiddie.

Aronimink gained media notoriety when it withdrew itself from plans to host the 1993 PGA Championship because it didn't have any current or prospective African-American members or applicants before the start of the tournament. The club has since met all of the PGA's minority membership requirements and has hosted both a Senior PGA and a USGA event since 1993, with the Women's PGA being held in October 2020.

== Course design and layout ==
Hole	Name	Yards	Par	Hole	Name	Yards	Par
1	Apache	434	4	10	Cherokee	444	4
2	Pueblo	413	4	11	Kiowea	425	4
3	Navajo	455	4	12	Saginaw	466	4
4	Seminole	457	4	13	Blackfoot	385	4
5	Mohawk	159	3	14	Iroquois	221	3
6	Comanche	402	4	15	Lenape	515	4
7	Shawnee	396	4	16	Sioux	556	5
8	Sitting Bull	242	3	17	Seneca	229	3
9	Kickapoo	605	5	18	Aronimink	463	4
Front		3,563	35	Back		3,704	35
Source:				Total		7,267	70

Aronimink embodies many of the principles that guided Donald Ross's approach to golf course design, which was rooted in the linksland golf of his native Scotland. To Ross it was important that the lay of the land have an effect on the ball being played – adding an element of chance to the game and enhancing the golfer's sense of excitement and anticipation. He incorporated hazards to present challenges and risks, and to protect par he was particularly clever around the greens with his bunkering and designs for the greens, which offered numerous challenging pin positions.

In 2003, Ron Prichard, a noted golf architect from the Philadelphia area and the foremost authority on Ross's design philosophy, completed a restoration project at Aronimink that recaptured classic Ross features that had been diminished and/or lost over time. Panoramic views were restored by eliminating overplanting. Based on Ross's original drawings for the course, greens were restored to their original shapes and sizes, and his unique bunkering style was reestablished. Length was added to neutralize the effect technology has had on golf and brought Ross's unique design features back into play in quite an effective fashion.

With the restoration, Donald Ross's Aronimink plays as he intended it to. As he said in 1948, two decades after the course opened, "I intended to make this my masterpiece, but not until today did I realize built better than I knew."

Aronimink’s course has 75 bunkers, along with sloping fairways and doglegs. From the championship tees, it measures 7,237 yards (6,618 m) and has a par of 70.

Aronimink's opening hole is one of the most memorable in golf. The intimidating first hole plunges down into a valley, then rises steeply, playing long and uphill to a well-guarded undulating green.

On the front nine there are a number of challenging doglegs, particularly the par four #7. Although not a long hole, the approach must carry a yawning bunker guarding the front of a green with several difficult pin locations. Then there is #8, perhaps the hardest par three on the course, playing 237 yards (217 m) downhill to a narrow green bisected by a large mound.

The turn for home at Aronimink begins with #10, a 454-yard (415 m) par four that is considered by many the most demanding on the course. The narrow fairway is guarded by a bunker on the right and deep rough on the left. A successful approach shot must avoid the water hazard protecting the front left of the sharply terraced green.

In 2003, John Jacobs birdied the last two holes to win the Senior PGA Championship. The 17th is a 187-yard (171 m) par three. An errant tee shot often finds the lake guarding the green. The finishing hole is a 436-yard (399 m) uphill par four, requires a precise tee shot and the approach shot is to a winding and sloped green with a numerous challenging pin locations.

== Past tournaments ==
Year	Tournament	Winner	Score	To par
1962	PGA Championship	(South Africa) Gary Player	278	−2
1977	U.S. Amateur	(United States) John Fought	9 & 8	
1997	U.S. Junior Amateur	(United States) Jason Allred	1 up	
2003	Senior PGA Championship	(United States) John Jacobs	276	−4
2010	AT&T National	(England) Justin Rose	270	−10
2011	AT&T National	(United States) Nick Watney	267	−13
2018	BMW Championship	(United States) Keegan Bradley	260	−20
2020	Women's PGA Championship	(South Korea) Kim Sei-young	266	−14
2026	PGA Championship	(England) Aaron Rai	271	−9

At the PGA Championship in 1962, Gary Player prevailed with 278 (−2), one stroke ahead of Bob Goalby. In 1977, John Fought needed only 28 holes to win the final match in the U.S. Amateur – 9 & 8 – over Doug Fischesser. In the 1997 U.S. Junior Amateur, Jason Allred beat Trevor Immelman in the final match, one-up. In 2003, John Jacobs won the Senior PGA Championship with a score 276 (−4). Justin Rose won the 2010 AT&T National with 270 (−10) after needing pars at the final two holes to win. The following year, Nick Watney defeated the field with a bogey-free round of 66 on Sunday for 267 (–13) after setting the course record of 62 (−8) on Saturday.

== Scorecard ==
Aronimink GC
Tee	Rating/Slope	1	2	3	4	5	6	7	8	9	Out	10	11	12	13	14	15	16	17	18	In	Total
Black	74.4/130	428	422	446	457	178	392	401	238	605	3,567	445	408	459	387	215	500	558	215	436	3,623	7,190
Blue	72.1/126	414	372	416	418	149	381	376	204	517	3,247	411	388	420	351	188	426	512	179	400	3,275	6,522
White	70.2/123	394	341	393	398	137	368	364	175	446	3,016	391	371	411	346	178	378	494	146	384	3,099	6,115
Red	74.7/132	391	310	333	398	126	359	356	174	395	2,842	391	366	373	327	178	365	438	138	351	2,927	5,769
Par	Men's	4	4	4	4	3	4	4	3	5	35	4	4	4	4	3	4	5	3	4	35	70
Par	Women's	5	4	4	5	3	4	4	3	5	37	5	4	5	4	3	4	5	3	4	37	74
SI	Men's	7	13	1	5	17	11	3	15	9		8	2	10	12	18	6	4	16	14
SI	Women's	7	13	9	15	17	5	1	11	3		14	2	10	6	16	4	8	18	12
