= List of golf courses in the Crown Dependencies =

This is a list of notable golf courses in the Crown Dependencies (Channel Islands and Isle of Man).

== Channel Islands ==
=== Guernsey ===
- La Grande Mare
- Royal Guernsey Golf Club
- St. Pierre Park Golf Club

=== Jersey ===
- La Moye Golf Club
- Les Mielles Golf Club
- Longueville Golf Range
- Royal Jersey Golf Course
- Wheatlands Golf Course

== Isle of Man ==
- Castletown Golf Links
- Comis Golf Course
- Douglas Golf Club
- King Edward Golf Club
- Peel Golf Course
- Port St Mary Golf Course
- Ramsey Golf Course
- Rowany Golf Course

== See also ==
- List of golf courses in the United Kingdom
