= Tony Coop =

English golfer (1934–2021)

Personal information
- Full name: Antony Bertram Coop
- Nationality: England
- Born: 25 May 1934 Wigan, Lancashire, England
- Died: 12 August 2021 (aged 87)

Career
- Sport: Golf
- Status: Professional
- Professional wins: 3

Best results in major championships
- Masters Tournament: DNP
- PGA Championship: DNP
- U.S. Open: DNP
- The Open Championship: 13th: 1961

Antony B. Coop (25 May 1934 – 12 August 2021) was an English professional golfer who won the 1965 Rediffusion Tournament. He played in the Open Championship 11 times, finishing 13th in 1961.

== Professional career ==
Coop was an assistant professional at Hesketh Golf Club before becoming the professional at Dean Wood Golf Club in Up Holland in about 1954. He retired in 1999, after 45 years at the club.

In September 1965, Coop won the Rediffusion Tournament at La Moye Golf Club in Jersey. Coop and Guy Wolstenholme were joint leaders entering the final round. In the final round, Denis Hutchinson came home with a 32 to record a 65 and overtake Peter Thomson, who also had a final round 65, for the clubhouse lead. Coop then birdied the final hole to beat Hutchinson by a shot. Bill Large needed a birdie at the last hole to tie with Coop but could only manage a par, to tie with Hutchinson. Coop won the first prize of £500. The previous week, he had finished tied for 5th place in the Dunlop Masters at Portmarnock despite a last round 75. He finished six strokes behind Bernard Hunt who won the £1,500 first prize. The following month, Coop was tied for 4th in the Piccadilly Medal, played on the East course at Wentworth. The next week, Coop was runner-up in the Gleneagles Hotel Foursomes Tournament, a pro-am tournament played at the Gleneagles Hotel. Playing with Ben Crabtree, they lost the final to Brian Huggett and Michael Burgess.

Coop was a regular competitor in the Open Championship, playing in 11 championships between 1955 and 1968. His best finish was 13th place in 1961. The final 36 holes were delayed by a day because of rain. Coop had rounds of 73 and 74 to finish 13 strokes behind Arnold Palmer. In 1958, he was tied for 7th place at the start of the final day but two rounds of 75 dropped him down into a tie for 20th. In 1964, he was tied for 8th at the start of the final day but two rounds of 76 left him in a tie for 24th place.

== Personal life ==
Coop died on 12 August 2021, at the age of 87. He was married with three children. His son Andrew also became a professional golfer.

== Tournament wins ==
- 1958 Northern Professional Championship
- 1965 Rediffusion Tournament, Leeds Cup

== Results in major championships ==
Tournament	1955	1956	1957	1958	1959	1960	1961	1962	1963	1964	1965	1966	1967	1968
The Open Championship	CUT		CUT	T20		42	13	22		T24	T31	58	CUT	CUT

Note: Coop only played in The Open Championship.

Did not play

CUT = missed the half-way cut
"T" indicates a tie for a place
