= 1965 New Zealand Golf Circuit =

Golf tour season

1965 New Zealand Golf Circuit season
- Duration: 18 November 1965 – 18 December 1965
- Number of official events: 7
- Most wins: (Australia) Peter Thomson (4)
- Money list: (Australia) Peter Thomson

The 1965 New Zealand Golf Circuit was the third season of the New Zealand Golf Circuit, the main professional golf tour in New Zealand since it was established in 1963.

== Schedule ==
The following table lists official events during the 1965 season.

Date	Tournament	Location	Purse (£NZ)	Winner (Note: The number in brackets after each winner's name is the number of New Zealand Golf Circuit events they had won up to and including that tournament. This information is only shown for New Zealand Golf Circuit members.)	Notes
21 Nov	New Zealand Open	Auckland	1,500	(Australia) Peter Thomson (3)	
23 Nov	Metalcraft Tournament	Waikato	1,000	(Australia) Peter Thomson (4)	
27 Nov	Caltex Tournament	Wellington	2,000	(Australia) Peter Thomson (5)	
30 Nov	Wattie's Tournament	Hawke's Bay	1,500	(New Zealand) Stuart Jones (a) (1)	
4 Dec	Forest Products Tournament	Waikato	2,000	(Australia) Kel Nagle (4)	
11 Dec	BP Tournament	Auckland	2,000	(Australia) Kel Nagle (5) (Australia) Peter Thomson (6)	Title shared
18 Dec	New Zealand Wills Masters	Canterbury	2,000	(Australia) Geoff Donald (1)	New tournament

== Money list ==
The money list was based on tournament results during the season, calculated in New Zealand pounds.

Position	Player	Prize money (£NZ)
1	(Australia) Peter Thomson	1,568
2	(Australia) Kel Nagle	1,363
3	(Australia) John Sullivan	995
4	(England) Guy Wolstenholme	887
5	(South Africa) Cedric Amm	840
