= Alex Caygill =

English professional golfer

Personal information
- Full name: Gordon Alexander Caygill
- Nationality: England
- Born: 24 April 1940 (age 86) Appleby-in-Westmorland, England

Career
- Sport: Golf
- Status: Professional
- Former tour: European Tour
- Professional wins: 20

Best results in major championships
- Masters Tournament: DNP
- PGA Championship: DNP
- U.S. Open: DNP
- The Open Championship: T16: 1966

Achievements and awards
- Sir Henry Cotton Rookie of the Year: 1961

Gordon Alexander Caygill (born 24 April 1940) is an English professional golfer. He had considerable early success as a young professional from 1960 to 1963 but then had a lean period, partly due to a stomach ulcer. He made a comeback in the late 1960s, winning two tournaments in early 1969, and gained a place in the 1969 Ryder Cup team.

== Professional career ==
Caygill turned professional at an early age, becoming an assistant professional at West Bowling Golf Club near Bradford. He was briefly an assistant at Sunningdale, during which time he won the 1960 British Youths Open Championship at Pannal Golf Club by 7 strokes. He became an assistant at Pannal in 1961 and was chosen that year by Henry Cotton as his Rookie of the Year. In 1962 he won the British Youths Open Championship, which was again played at Pannal, for a second time, winning this time by 12 strokes. He had more success in 1963, winning the Coombe Hill Assistants' Tournament and the Rediffusion Tournament in the same week. In the 1964 Swallow-Penfold Tournament Caygill led Peter Alliss by 3 strokes with 5 holes to play but finished badly to drop into a tie for second place.

After his early successes he did not win again on the circuit until 1969 having suffered with stomach ulcers. That year he won twice, first at the Penfold Tournament, and then again at the Martini International, where he tied with South African Graham Henning. Caygill finished 8th in the points list for the Great Britain and Ireland 1969 Ryder Cup team. The leading six were chosen automatically and Caygill was one of the remaining six selected by a committee a few days later. He only played one match, partnering Brian Huggett in Friday's foursomes. They halved their match against the American pair of Raymond Floyd and Miller Barber. He finished the season 9th in the Order of Merit.

In 1970 Caygill had his only foreign win, the Lusaka Dunlop Open on the Safari Circuit, finishing two strokes of Craig Defoy. He played a limited number of events during the early years of the European Tour, from 1972 to 1977. His best finish was to reach the semi-final of the 1975 Piccadilly Medal. Caygill finished third in the 1974 PGA Club Professionals' Championship to qualify for the Diamondhead Cup, the forerunner of the PGA Cup. Caygill made 14 appearances in the Open Championship between 1962 and 1977, making the cut six times.

Caygill became the professional at Cleckheaton Golf Club in the mid-1960s, leaving in 1973 to join the Pleasington club in Lancashire. He later moved to the Crimple Valley club, near Harrogate and later to Branshaw. In 1981 Caygill was fined £500 and suspended by the PGA following an incident the previous October at the Wansbeck Classic, a pro-am event.

== Professional wins (20) ==
=== Great Britain and Ireland wins (6) ===
Date	Tournament	Winning score	Margin of victory	Runner(s)-up	Ref.
5 Aug 1960	British Youths Open Championship	66-71-71-71=279	7 strokes	(Scotland) Campbell Brownlee (a)	
10 Aug 1962	British Youths Open Championship	74-73-72-68=287	12 strokes	(England) Cliff Bowman (a)	
26 Sep 1963	Coombe Hill Assistants' Tournament	71-76-69=216	2 strokes	(England) Malcolm Gregson, (England) Tony Jacklin	
29 Sep 1963	Rediffusion Tournament	70-68-66-67=271	Playoff	(England) David Snell, (Belgium) Flory Van Donck	
3 May 1969	Penfold Tournament	67-70-70-71=278	2 strokes	(Republic of Ireland) Christy O'Connor Snr	
14 Jun 1969	Martini International	70-66-77-69=282	Tie	(South Africa) Graham Henning	

=== Safari circuit wins (1) ===
Date	Tournament	Winning score	Margin of victory	Runner-up	Ref
22 Mar 1970	Lusaka Dunlop Open	−7 (70-68-73-74=285)	2 strokes	(Wales) Craig Defoy	

=== Other wins (13) ===
- 1961 Yorkshire Professional Championship
- 1963 Northern Professional Championship (incorporating the Leeds Cup)
- 1964 Yorkshire Professional Championship, Ryder Cup Reunion Foursomes Tournament (with Ken Bousfield)
- 1966 Yorkshire Professional Championship, Gleneagles Hotel Foursomes Tournament (with Bernard Cawthray)
- 1967 Leeds Cup
- 1971 Yorkshire Open
- 1973 Leeds Cup, Lancashire Open
- 1974 Northern Professional Championship
- 1978 Sunningdale Foursomes (with Julia Greenhalgh), Yorkshire Professional Championship

== Results in major championships ==
Tournament	1962	1963	1964	1965	1966	1967	1968	1969
The Open Championship	CUT	CUT	T17	CUT	T16	CUT	T24	T25

Tournament	1970	1971	1972	1973	1974	1975	1976	1977
The Open Championship	T41	CUT		CUT	CUT		T63	CUT

Note: Caygill only played in The Open Championship.

Did not play

CUT = missed the half-way cut
"T" indicates a tie for a place

== Team appearances ==
- Ryder Cup (representing Great Britain and Ireland): 1969 (tie)
- Diamondhead Cup (representing Great Britain and Ireland): 1974
