= 1968 APG Tour Qualifying School graduates =

This is a list of the 1968 APG Tour Qualifying School graduates.

== Tournament summary ==
This was the only qualifying school for the American Professional Golfers (APG), a briefly lived breakaway tour that was created by tour golfers who were upset with financial arrangements with the PGA of America. The APG is the direct antecedent for an independent PGA Tour which began shortly thereafter.

The tournament was played over 144 holes at the Doral Country Club in Doral, Florida in mid October. There were 39 players in the field and 21 earned their tour card.

Dutch golfer Martin Roesink was the medallist. Australian Bob Shaw finished in second place.

== Results ==
Place	Player	Notes
1	(Netherlands) Martin Roesink	Winner of 1967 New Zealand Wills Masters
2	(Australia) Bob Shaw	Winner of 1968 Spanish Open
3	(Canada) Bob Panasik	Winner of 1962 and 1963 Ontario PGA Assistants Championship
4	(United States) Ross Randall	
T5	(United States) Jerry Don Barrier	
T5	(Canada) Wayne Vollmer	
T7	(United States) Curtis Sifford	
T7	(United States) Randy Wolff	
T9	(United States) Bobby Lockett	
T9	(Mexico) Cesar Sanudo	Winner of 1966 Mexican Amateur
11	(United States) Roger Buhrt	
12	(United States) Lawrence Sears	
13	(United States) Leslie Peterson	
14	(United States) Henry Taylor	
15	(United States) Frank Mize Jr.	
16	(United States) Lee Davis Jr.	
T17	(United States) Howard Brown	
T17	(Canada) Bill Wakeham	
T19	(Canada) Bob Cox Jr.	
T19	(United States) Butch Harmon	
T19	(United States) Robert Pratt	
