= Martin Roesink =

Dutch professional golfer (born 1939)

Personal information
- Nickname: Hercules
- Nationality: Netherlands
- Born: 24 July 1939 (age 87) Diepenveen, Netherlands
- Height: 6 ft 3 in (191 cm)
- Weight: 190 lb (86 kg)
- Spouse: Donna

Career
- Sport: Golf
- Turned professional: 1960
- Former tours: PGA Tour; Asia Golf Circuit; PGA Tour of Australia; New Zealand Golf Circuit
- Professional wins: 2

Best results in major championships
- Masters Tournament: DNP
- PGA Championship: DNP
- U.S. Open: DNP
- The Open Championship: CUT: 1967, 1969

Martin Roesink (born 24 July 1939) is a Dutch professional golfer. In the mid-1960s he had much success in Australasian region, posting several high finishes culminating with a win at the 1967 New Zealand Wills Masters. The following year he tried out for the PGA Tour and was successful, performing as medallist at the fall Q-School. He played on the PGA Tour for five seasons, recording a number of top tens, including a runner-up finish in 1970. Since then, he has worked primarily as a club professional and golf manager in the American state of Ohio.

== Early life ==
Roesink was born in Diepenveen, Netherlands. Later he lived in Deventer, Netherlands.

== Professional career ==
Roesink turned pro in 1960. In mid-1960s, Roesink first started to receive media attention. As of January 1965, he had committed to play a number of Asia Golf Circuit events. In March, he opened well at the Malaysian Open, shooting a 70 (−3) to put himself in second place. The following week he also opened well at the Thailand Open, shooting an opening round 70 (−2) to place himself in a tie for third. Late in the year, he started playing events on the Australian and New Zealand circuits. In December, he played excellently during the first round of the BP Tournament. He demonstrated "tremendous putting" to score seven birdies and take a one stroke lead over Peter Thomson, Bob Charles, and Guy Wolstenholme. In August 1966, he finished joint runner-up at the Engadine Open in Switzerland, four strokes behind Harold Henning.

Roesink would have much success during the 1966–67 season in the Australasian region. He again played well at the BP Tournament. On 4 December, he shot a final round 66 (−6) to finish joint runner-up with Englishman Clive Clark, three behind champion Kel Nagle. A few days later, he played in another event in New Zealand, the Metalcraft Tournament. He finished in a tie for fifth at 282 (−6). In January 1967, he held a one-stroke lead over Bill Dunk, at 138 (−8), after the first two rounds of the New Zealand PGA Championship. He finished regulation at 274 (−18) in a tie with Tony Jacklin. Jacklin and Roesink played an 18-hole playoff to determine the champion. Both players were one-under-par after the first seven holes. The "turning point" occurred on the par-4 8th as Roesink hit his approach out of bounds. He made triple bogey. Jacklin ultimately shot a 69 (−4) and defeated Roesink by six strokes. In March 1967, Roesink had one of his best performances on the Asian circuit at the Singapore Open. During the first round, he shot a 70 (−1) to put himself in a tie for fifth place, two back of the lead. He ultimately finished in a tie for fifth at 290 (+6), eight behind champion Ben Arda.

In the summer, he qualified for the 1967 Open Championship at Royal Liverpool Golf Club. He missed the cut. It was the first major championship he played in.

Late in 1967, he returned to New Zealand. In December, he played the New Zealand Wills Masters at Russley Golf Club. He opened poorly with a 75 (+2). In the second round, however, he shot a 33 (−4) over the front nine. Then, on the par-5 16th, he "played one of the shots of the day," a three-wood approach "clearing tall pines" to finish pin high. He ultimately shot a second round 68 (−5). During the final day, when the last two rounds were played, Roesink played "brilliant golf," shooting 68 and 67 to tie Bob Charles. They finished at 278 (−14). There were no playoffs so the tournament ended in a tie. Kel Nagle and Ted Ball were the closest competitors at 280, two behind.

In 1968, he recorded highlights across several continents. In January 1968, he played in New Zealand's Spalding Masters, a three-round tournament. In the final round, he shot a course record 63 to finish in a tie for sixth place. In August, he played well at the Woodlawn Tournament, a two-round tournament held at an American air force base in Germany. Roesnik opened with a 67 (−3). He shot a final round 70 to tie Frank Phillips at the end of regulation. The two then played in a "tense play-off." At the par-5 2nd hole, both men made eagle 3s. However, Phillips ultimately prevailed. In late 1968, Roesink attempted to make the American Professional Golfers (APG) Tour at its qualifying school. He played very well, scoring 585 over eight rounds to earn medallist honors. He was one of 21 players to advance to the main tour.

One of the first tournaments he played on the PGA Tour was the 1969 Phoenix Open. He shot four consecutive rounds in the 60s to finish at 271. He finished in a tie for 14th; it would be his best finish of the year. Later in the year, he played the 1969 Open Championship at Royal Lytham & St Annes Golf Club. It was his second and final major championship. He made the second round cut but missed the third round cut. Overall that year, he made the cut in 10 of 13 PGA Tour events. Late in the year, he played the 1969 World Cup at Singapore Island Country Club. Though his team did not have a distinguished effort, finishing 26th out of 45 teams, individually Roesink finished in a tie for ninth against 90 players.

In 1970, he played in 12 events on the PGA Tour, recording his first top-10s, a 2nd and 3rd place finish. In early 1971, he played some events on the Caribbean Tour, a satellite tour operated by the PGA Tour. In 1971, he again played in 12 PGA Tour events and recorded another top-10 at the East Ridge Classic. In 1972, he played in 15 events and made the cut in 10 of them. However, he did not record any top-10s. The following year, in 1973, was his last year playing extensively on the PGA Tour. He made the cut in half of his 8 events but with no high finishes only made $1,554. He played in only one more PGA Tour event for the remainder of his career.

After he quit playing the PGA Tour, he moved to Canton, Ohio. He worked as a club professional at Skyland Pines Golf Club in Canton. In 1976, he won the Ohio Open.

In 1989, Roesink turned 50 and started to play some senior events. In 1991, he attempted to join the Senior PGA Tour through its qualifying school. He finished tie for 58th, failing to break 76 over the four rounds, and was not successful. In 1994 and 1997, he qualified for the Senior PGA Championship, a major championship on the senior tour, making the cut both times. Late in his career he also played the Ohio Senior Open.

As of 2008, he was the golf manager and club professional at Tam O'Shanter Golf Course.

Roesink's nickname was "Hercules" due to his muscular build. He was one of the longest hitters on the Asia Golf Circuit and PGA Tour. He was considered by some to be even longer than Jack Nicklaus.

== Personal life ==
Roesink met his future wife, Donna, in 1972.

== Awards and honors ==
In 1998, he was elected to the Northern Ohio PGA Hall of Fame.

== Professional wins (2) ==
=== New Zealand Golf Circuit wins (1) ===
No.	Date	Tournament	Winning score	Margin of victory	Runner-up
1	2 Dec 1967	New Zealand Wills Masters	−14 (75-68-68-67=278)	Shared title with (New Zealand) Bob Charles	

=== Other wins (1) ===
- 1976 Ohio Open

== Results in major championships ==
Tournament	1967	1968	1969
The Open Championship	CUT		CUT

Did not play

CUT = missed the half-way cut (3rd round cut in 1969 Open Championship)
Note: Roesink only played in The Open Championship.

== Team appearances ==
- World Cup (representing the Netherlands): 1963, 1964, 1966, 1967, 1968, 1969

== See also ==
- 1968 APG Tour Qualifying School graduates
