= Coles Tournament =

Australian golf tournament

Tournament information
- Location: Australia
- Established: 1959
- Course(s): Huntingdale Golf Club
- Final year: 1960

Final champion
- Len Woodward

The Coles Tournament was a golf tournament held in Australia in 1959 and 1960. The events were held at Huntingdale Golf Club, Melbourne. Total prize money was A£3,000 in 1959 and A£5,000 in 1960. The sponsor was Coles Stores, an Australian retailer.

== Winners ==
Year	Winner	Country	Score	Margin of victory	Runner-up	Winner's share (A£)	Ref
1959	Peter Thomson	Australia	282	6 strokes	(Australia) Kel Nagle	650	
1960	Len Woodward	Australia	292	1 stroke	(Australia) Darrell Welch	1,500	
