= 1967 PGA Tour Qualifying School graduates =

This is a list of the 1967 PGA Tour Qualifying School graduates.

== Tournament summary ==
The tournament was played over 144 holes at the PGA National Golf Club in Palm Beach Gardens, Florida in mid-October. The field of 111 was considered to have a number of "star" amateur golfers. These included Deane Beman, Bob Murphy, Ron Cerrudo, Marty Fleckman, and Bunky Henry. In addition, the field included Lee Elder, "whom many are predicting will be the first top-ranking Negro player."

A number of notable international golfers played. These included the top three golfers from Britain: Tony Jacklin, Peter Townsend, and Clive Clark. Jacklin and Townsend earned playing privileges. Burmese golfer Mya Aye tried out for the tour at the tournament. He was successful becoming one of the first Asians to receive a PGA Tour card. South Africa's Bobby Cole was the medallist, tying the record for lowest total. Overall, thirty players earned their tour card in total.

== List of graduates ==
Place	Player	Notes
1	(South Africa) Bobby Cole	Winner of 1966 British Amateur
2	(United States) Gibby Gilbert	
T3	(United States) Deane Beman	Winner of 1959 British Amateur, 1960 & 1963 U.S. Amateur
T3	(United States) Ron Cerrudo	
T5	(United States) George Boutell	
T5	(United States) Bob Murphy	Winner of 1965 U.S. Amateur
7	(United States) James Grant	
T8	(United States) Don Higgins	
T8	(United States) Bob E. Smith	
10	(Canada) Alvie Thompson	
T11	(England) Tony Jacklin	Winner of 1967 New Zealand PGA Championship and 1967 British Masters
T11	(United States) Richard Rhoads	
T13	(United States) Steve Eichstaedt	
T13	(England) Peter Townsend	Winner of 1967 Dutch Open
T15	(United States) Lee Elder	
T15	(United States) Orville Moody	Three-time winner of Korea Open. Two-time winner of KPGA Championship
T17	(United States) Marty Fleckman	Low amateur at 1967 U.S. Open
T17	(United States) Barry Meerdink	
19	(United States) Terry Winter	
T20	(United States) Bunky Henry	Winner of 1965 Canadian Amateur
T20	(United States) William Robinson	
22	(United States) Richard Potzner	
T23	(United States) James Langley	
T23	(Myanmar) Mya Aye	
T25	(United States) Mike Hadlock	
T25	(United States) Jimmy Hiskey	
T25	(United States) Rodney Horn	
28	(United States) Richard Carmody	
T29	(United States) Terry Comstock	
T29	(United States) Johnny Stevens	
