= Dick Harmon =

American golf instructor (1947–2006)

Dick Harmon (July 29, 1947 – February 10, 2006) was a PGA golf professional and instructor.

== Early life ==
Harmon was a native of New Rochelle, New York and Palm Springs, California. His father Claude Harmon won the 1948 Masters Tournament. His brothers Butch, Craig, and Bill were also ranked in Golf Digest's Top 50 Teachers.

== Career ==
Harmon was the professional at the River Oaks Country Club between 1977 and 2001. After leaving that position, he established two teaching centres in Houston, Texas.

Harmon established the Dick Harmon School of Golf at the Houstonian with teaching assistant and friend Arthur J. Scarbrough. He had clients like major championship winners Fred Couples, Craig Stadler, Lanny Wadkins, Steve Elkington, and Lucas Glover.

== Personal life ==
On February 10, 2006, Harmon died at the age of 58 from complications due to pneumonia.
