= Rediffusion Tournament =

Tournament information
- Location: Jersey
- Established: 1963
- Course(s): La Moye Golf Club
- Month played: September
- Final year: 1966

Final champion
- Peter Alliss

Location in Jersey

The Rediffusion Tournament was a professional golf tournament played at La Moye Golf Club, Jersey from 1963 to 1966.

== Winners ==
Year	Winner	Country	Score	Margin of victory	Runner(s)-up	Winner's share (£)	Ref
1963	Alex Caygill	England	271	Playoff (2nd hole)	(Belgium) Flory Van Donck (England) David Snell	500	
1964	Bernard Hunt	England	264	3 strokes	(England) Peter Alliss	500	
1965	Tony Coop	England	268	1 stroke	(South Africa) Denis Hutchinson (England) Bill Large	500	
1966	Peter Alliss	England	267	1 stroke	(England) Tony Jacklin	500	
