= Butch Harmon =

Professional golfer, golf instructor, author (born 1943)

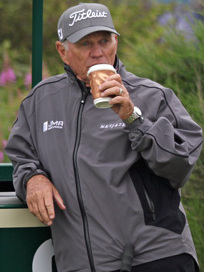
- Harmon in 2012

Personal information
- Full name: Claude Harmon Jr.
- Nationality: United States
- Born: August 28, 1943 (age 83) New Rochelle, New York, U.S.
- Spouse: Christy Harmon
- Children: 4

Career
- Sport: Golf
- College: University of Houston
- Turned professional: 1965
- Former tour: PGA Tour
- Professional wins: 1

Best results in major championships
- Masters Tournament: DNP
- PGA Championship: DNP
- U.S. Open: CUT: 1970
- The Open Championship: DNP

Claude "Butch" Harmon Jr. (born August 28, 1943) is an American golf instructor and former professional player.

== Early life ==
Butch Harmon was born and raised in New Rochelle, New York. His parents were Claude Harmon, Sr. and Alice Harmon (1918–1970). His father was the head pro at the nearby Winged Foot Golf Club in Mamaroneck, New York. His father also won two PGA Tour events including the 1948 Masters Tournament. The family also lived part of the year in Florida, when Butch's father served as the winter professional at the Seminole Golf Club.

Butch began playing golf from an early age, as did his three younger brothers, Craig, Bill, and Dick (1947–2006), who also all became golf professionals. In 1962, Butch graduated from New Rochelle High School.

Harmon attended the University of Houston, and served in the U.S. Army for three years, seeing duty in the Vietnam War.

== Professional career ==
At 1968 APG Tour Qualifying School, Harmon earned PGA Tour playing privileges. Harmon won the 1971 inaugural Broome County Open, which was a PGA Tour satellite event played against the 1971 Open Championship.

For the remainder of his career, however, Harmon has worked primarily as a golf coach. Harmon lived in Morocco for several years in the 1970s, serving as the personal instructor to King Hassan II. Concurrently, he was a club professional in the United States, beginning his career at Crow Valley Golf Club in Davenport, Iowa.

Harmon is best known for having been Tiger Woods's golf coach from 1993 to 2004 and Phil Mickelson's golf coach from 2007 to 2015. He has also worked with other major champions such as Ernie Els, Stewart Cink, Greg Norman, Davis Love III, Fred Couples and Justin Leonard, and with younger stars such as Nick Watney and Rickie Fowler. Before semi-retiring from the tour in 2019, he coached Jimmy Walker, Dustin Johnson, and Gary Woodland.

In 2003, Harmon was ranked the top golf teacher in the United States in a poll of his peers organized by Golf Digest magazine, and has repeated as winner of this honor each year since. He runs the Butch Harmon School of Golf at the Rio Secco Golf Club in Las Vegas, Nevada. The school also has a branch in Dubai at The Els Golf Club in Dubai Sports City and The Floridian in Palm City, Florida. He also gives golf clinics around the world.

He also worked with Greg Norman on his multi-media learning system Greg Norman's Better Golf, which consists of three videos, a book, skill guide cards, and an audio tape; as well as on Greg Norman's book Advanced Golf. Harmon writes a regular monthly instructional column in Golf Digest magazine. Butch has also appeared in an episode of the TV show Pawn Stars in which he taught Chumlee to play golf, along with Corey Harrison.

== Personal life ==
Harmon is married to Christy. He has three children. He also has a daughter from a previous marriage.

Harmon's brothers Craig and Bill are also both golf coaches, who have made the top 50 Instructors' list compiled by Golf Digest on several occasions. Butch's other brother, Dick, was the golf professional at the River Oaks Country Club in Houston, Texas, from 1977 to 2001.

== Professional wins (1) ==
- 1971 Broome County Open

== Bibliography ==
- Harmon, Butch; Andrisiani, John; Four Cornerstones of Winning Golf, (1997)
- Harmon, Butch, Butch Harmon's Playing Lessons, (1999)
- Harmon, Butch; The Pro: Lessons About Golf and Life from My Father, Claude Harmon, Sr., (2007)
- Harmon, Butch; Bradley, Nick, Kinetic Golf: Picture the Game Like Never Before, (2013)
- Harmon Butch, Harmon, Tony; The Perfect Golf Swing: The Importance of Coordination, Control, and Proper Sequencing: Golf Guide, (2023)

== See also ==
- 1968 APG Tour Qualifying School graduates
