= Mobilco Tournament =

Tournament information
- Location: Australia
- Established: 1952
- Course(s): Cottesloe Golf Club
- Month played: August
- Final year: 1952

Final champion
- Peter Thomson

The Mobilco Tournament was a golf tournament held at Cottesloe Golf Club in Western Australia. It was held just once, in August 1952, and was won by Peter Thomson. Total prize money was £2,000. The sponsor was Mobilco Machinery, an Australian farm machinery manufacturer.

== Winners ==
Year	Winner	Country	Score	Margin of victory	Runners-up	Winner's share (A£)	Ref
1952	Peter Thomson	Australia	278	2 strokes	(Australia) John Collins (Australia) Kel Nagle (Australia) Ossie Pickworth	500	
