= 1970 Piccadilly World Match Play Championship =

Coordinates: 51°23′48″N 0°35′45″W

Tournament information
- Dates: 8–10 October 1970
- Location: Virginia Water, Surrey, England
- Course(s): West Course, Wentworth
- Format: Match play – 36 holes

Statistics
- Par: 74
- Length: 6,997 yards (6,398 m)
- Field: 8 players
- Prize fund: £18,400
- Winner's share: £5,750

Champion
- (United States) Jack Nicklaus
- def. Lee Trevino 2 & 1

The 1970 Piccadilly World Match Play Championship was the seventh World Match Play Championship. It was played from Thursday 8 to Saturday 10 October on the West Course at Wentworth Club in Surrey, England. Eight players competed in a straight knock-out competition, with each match contested over 36 holes. The champion received £5,750 out of a total prize fund of £18,400. In the final, Jack Nicklaus beat Lee Trevino 2 & 1.

In the first round, two matches finished at the 36th hole. Tony Jacklin won the last two holes to defeat Gary Player while Lee Trevino beat Billy Casper by holing a 6-foot putt after Casper had missed from 8 feet.

Nicklaus was playing in the event for the first time since 1966 when he had a dispute with the referee in the final. After two comfortable wins, he met Lee Trevino in the final. The final was level after 12 holes but Nicklaus won three of the next five holes to go to lunch 3 up. After 27 holes, Nicklaus led by five with both players having birdied the 9th. Trevino then won the 10th, 11th, 13th and 14th to reduce the lead to 1 hole. However Nicklaus eagled the 15th to take a two-hole lead again and, although Trevino birdied the 16th, the match ended at the 17th after Trevino had gone out of bounds off the tee.

== Course ==
| Hole | 1 | 2 | 3 | 4 | 5 | 6 | 7 | 8 | 9 | Out | 10 | 11 | 12 | 13 | 14 | 15 | 16 | 17 | 18 | In | Total |
|---|---|---|---|---|---|---|---|---|---|---|---|---|---|---|---|---|---|---|---|---|---|
| Yards | 476 | 157 | 457 | 497 | 192 | 347 | 403 | 400 | 460 | 3,389 | 190 | 408 | 480 | 437 | 183 | 480 | 380 | 555 | 495 | 3,608 | 6,997 |
| Par | 5 | 3 | 4 | 5 | 3 | 4 | 4 | 4 | 4 | 36 | 3 | 4 | 5 | 4 | 3 | 5 | 4 | 5 | 5 | 38 | 74 |

== Scores ==
Quarter-finals; 8 October
(New Zealand) Bob Charles
(United States) Dave Stockton | 2 & 1
(United States) Billy Casper
(United States) Lee Trevino | 1 up
(England) Tony Jacklin | 2 up
(South Africa) Gary Player
(United States) Jack Nicklaus | 5 & 4
(United States) Gene Littler

Semi-finals; 9 October
(United States) Dave Stockton
(United States) Lee Trevino | 7 & 6
(England) Tony Jacklin
(United States) Jack Nicklaus | 5 & 4

Final; 10 October
(United States) Lee Trevino
(United States) Jack Nicklaus | 2 & 1

== Prize money ==
The winner received £5,750 out of a total prize fund of £18,400.
