= 1966 New Zealand Golf Circuit =

Golf tour season

1966 New Zealand Golf Circuit season
- Duration: 17 November 1966 – 17 December 1966
- Number of official events: 7
- Most wins: (New Zealand) Bob Charles (4)
- Money list: (New Zealand) Bob Charles

The 1966 New Zealand Golf Circuit was the fourth season of the New Zealand Golf Circuit, the main professional golf tour in New Zealand since it was established in 1963.

== Schedule ==
The following table lists official events during the 1966 season.

Date	Tournament	Location	Purse (£NZ)	Winner (Note: The number in brackets after each winner's name is the number of New Zealand Golf Circuit events they had won up to and including that tournament. This information is only shown for New Zealand Golf Circuit members.)	Notes
19 Nov	New Zealand Open	Wellington	1,800	(New Zealand) Bob Charles (2)	
22 Nov	Wattie's Tournament	Hawke's Bay	1,500	(New Zealand) Bob Charles (3)	
26 Nov	New Zealand Wills Masters	Canterbury	1,500	(Australia) Peter Thomson (7) (Australia) Tim Woolbank (1)	Title shared
3 Dec	BP Tournament	Wellington	2,000	(Australia) Kel Nagle (6)	
6 Dec	Metalcraft Tournament	Waikato	1,200	(New Zealand) Bob Charles (4)	
11 Dec	Forest Products Tournament	Waikato	2,000	(New Zealand) Bob Charles (5) (England) Tony Jacklin (n/a)	Title shared
17 Dec	Caltex Tournament	Wellington	2,000	(Australia) Kel Nagle (7) (Australia) Peter Thomson (8)	Title shared

== Money list ==
The money list was based on tournament results during the season, calculated in New Zealand pounds.

Position	Player	Prize money (£NZ)
1	(New Zealand) Bob Charles	1,595
2	(Australia) Kel Nagle	1,299
3	(England) Guy Wolstenholme	1,053
4	(Australia) Peter Thomson	910
5	(England) Tony Jacklin	905
