= Cesar Sanudo =

Mexican professional golfer (1943–2011)

Personal information
- Nationality: Mexico
- Born: October 26, 1943 Tijuana, Mexico
- Died: August 28, 2011 (aged 67) La Mesa, California, U.S.
- Height: 5 ft 10 in (1.78 m)
- Weight: 175 lb (79 kg; 12.5 st)

Career
- Sport: Golf
- College: Grossmont Junior College; Lamar Tech
- Status: Professional
- Former tour: PGA Tour
- Professional wins: 2

Number of wins by tour
- PGA Tour: 1
- Other: 1

Best results in major championships
- Masters Tournament: T43: 1973
- PGA Championship: T47: 1971
- U.S. Open: T9: 1972
- The Open Championship: DNP

Cesar Sanudo (October 26, 1943 – August 28, 2011) was a Mexican professional golfer who played on the PGA Tour and the Senior PGA Tour.

== Early life ==
Sanudo was born and raised in Tijuana, Mexico with his four siblings. Like many other Hispanic professional golfers of the era, Sanudo got his start in golf by caddying. His first job was at Tijuana Country Club in 1954. During his teens he moved from Tijuana to San Diego. He graduated from El Cajon High School in El Cajon, California. While in high school he improved on his golf game through San Diego's elite juniors program.

== Amateur career ==
Sanudo had a number of highlights as an amateur golfer. He made the semi-final of the 1965 U.S. Amateur. He also won winning the 1966 Mexican Amateur. He qualified for the 1966 Masters Tournament as an amateur.

== Professional career ==
Sanudo primarily played on tour between 1969 and 1982, vacillating between full-time and part-time status. His sole PGA Tour win came at the 1970 Azalea Open Invitational held in Cape Fear, North Carolina; he earned $12,000 for his efforts by defeating Bobby Mitchell by one stroke at 15-under-par 269. Sanudo described it as the proudest moment of his professional career. With the win, Sanudo became the first Mexican player to win on the PGA Tour. He was later followed by Victor Regalado in 1974 and Carlos Ortiz in 2020.

Nearly two years after his PGA Tour victory, Sanudo seriously contended for a major championship for the only time. At the 1972 U.S. Open he was tied for the lead after two rounds. Over the weekend, in the high winds at Pebble Beach, he fell back considerably with scores of 78-77 but would still finish in the top 10.

Sanudo finished second at the European Tour's 1974 Benson & Hedges Match Play Championship to Australia's Jack Newton. He defeated British golfers Maurice Bembridge and David Jagger on his way to reaching the finals. It was the only time he would finish runner-up on either the European Tour or PGA Tour.

By the mid-1970s, he lost his full-time playing status and worked in the used car business. He briefly regained full time status but after the 1981 season he would rarely play again on tour. After his PGA Tour playing days were over, Sanudo became a long-time club professional in El Cajon, California and later at the Coronado Municipal Golf Course.

== Personal life ==
Sanudo was in a relationship with Kris Houghton – now Kris Jenner – in the mid-1970s. After they broke up he married Jacqui Schenz. They had three children: Amber, Anthony, and Lee. Lee is a local teaching professional.

Sanudo was good friends with Lee Trevino. He also played golf with Presidents Nixon, Ford, and George H.W. Bush.

Sanudo died in 2011 in La Mesa, California.

== Amateur wins ==
- 1966 Mexican Amateur

== Professional wins (2) ==
=== PGA Tour wins (1) ===
No.	Date	Tournament	Winning score	Margin of victory	Runner-up
1	Oct 4, 1970	Azalea Open Invitational	−15 (66-68-68-67=269)	1 stroke	(United States) Bobby Mitchell

=== Other wins (1) ===
- 1973 Columbia Open

== Results in major championships ==
Tournament	1966	1967	1968	1969	1970	1971	1972	1973	1974	1975	1976
Masters Tournament	CUT							T43			
U.S. Open		T54			CUT		T9	T39			CUT
PGA Championship						T47					

Note: Sanudo never played in The Open Championship.

Top 10
Did not play

CUT = missed the half-way cut
"T" = tied

== See also ==
- 1968 APG Tour Qualifying School graduates
