= Blaxnit (Ulster) Tournament =

Tournament information
- Location: Northern Ireland
- Established: 1963
- Final year: 1967

Final champion
- Hugh Boyle

The Blaxnit (Ulster) Tournament was a golf tournament played in Northern Ireland from 1963 to 1967. The event was sponsored by Blaxnit, a local manufacturer of socks and tights.

== Winners ==
Year	Winner	Country	Venue	Score	Margin of victory	Runner-up	Winner's share (£)	Ref
1963	Harry Weetman	England	Shandon Park Golf Club	269	7 strokes	(Republic of Ireland) Christy O'Connor Snr		
1964	Jimmy Martin	Ireland	Shandon Park Golf Club	277	Playoff	(Republic of Ireland) Christy O'Connor Snr	400	
1965	No tournament							
1966	Tony Jacklin	England	Malone Golf Club	284	5 strokes	(England) Tony Grubb		
1967	Hugh Boyle	Ireland	Malone Golf Club	276	2 strokes	(Wales) Dave Thomas	500	
