= Forest Products Tournament =

Golf Tournament

Tournament information
- Location: Tokoroa, New Zealand
- Established: 1964
- Course: Tokoroa Golf Club
- Par: 72
- Tour: New Zealand Golf Circuit
- Format: Stroke play
- Prize fund: £NZ2,000
- Month played: December
- Final year: 1966

Tournament record score
- Aggregate: 269 Kel Nagle (1965)
- To par: −19 as above

Final champion
- (New Zealand) Bob Charles and (England) Tony Jacklin

Location map
- Location in New Zealand

The Forest Products Tournament was a golf tournament held in New Zealand from 1964 to 1966. The event was hosted by Tokoroa Golf Club in Tokoroa. The 1966 event resulted in a tie between Bob Charles and Tony Jacklin. The event was part of the New Zealand Golf Circuit.

== Winners ==
Year	Winner	Score	To par	Margin of victory	Runner(s)-up	Ref.
1966	(New Zealand) Bob Charles (England) Tony Jacklin	272	−16	Title shared		
1965	(Australia) Kel Nagle	269	−19	1 stroke	(South Africa) Cedric Amm	
1964	(Australia) Peter Thomson	202	−11	1 stroke	(South Africa) Cobie Legrange (Australia) Kel Nagle	
