= Tony Jacklin =

English professional golfer (born 1944)

Tony Jacklin CBE
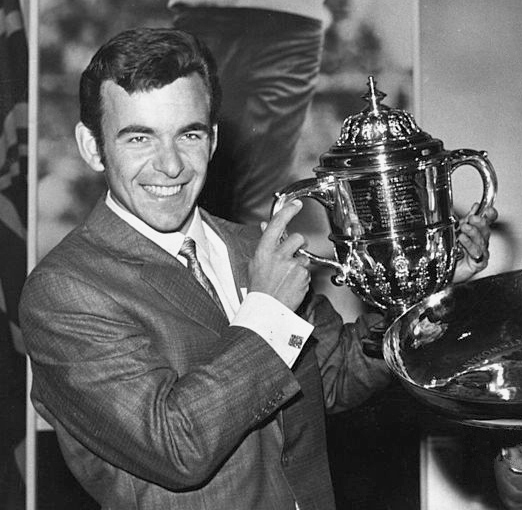
- Jacklin in 1970

Personal information
- Full name: Anthony Jacklin
- Nationality: England
- Born: 7 July 1944 (age 82) Scunthorpe, Lincolnshire, England
- Height: 5 ft 10 in (1.78 m)
- Weight: 180 lb (82 kg)
- Spouses: Vivien (m. 1966, d. 1988); Astrid Waagen (m. 1988)
- Children: 6

Career
- Sport: Golf
- Turned professional: 1962
- Former tours: European Tour; European Seniors Tour; PGA Tour; Champions Tour
- Professional wins: 29

Number of wins by tour
- PGA Tour: 4
- European Tour: 8
- PGA Tour Champions: 2
- Other: 15

Best results in major championships (wins: 2)
- Masters Tournament: T12: 1970
- PGA Championship: T25: 1969
- U.S. Open: Won: 1970
- The Open Championship: Won: 1969

Achievements and awards
- World Golf Hall of Fame: 2002 (member page)
- Commander of the Order of the British Empire: 1990
- Sir Henry Cotton Rookie of the Year: 1963

Anthony Jacklin (born 7 July 1944) is an English golfer. He was the most successful British player of his generation, winning two major championships, the 1969 Open Championship and the 1970 U.S. Open. He was also Ryder Cup captain from 1983 to 1989, Europe winning two and tying another of these four events.

After a brief amateur career, Jacklin turned professional at the start of 1962 and in 1963 was chosen by Henry Cotton as his Rookie of the Year. In 1967 he won two tournaments on the British PGA circuit and he finished fifth, behind Roberto De Vicenzo, in the Open Championship. That year he also made the first televised hole-in-one, made his debut in the 1967 Ryder Cup and qualified for the 1968 PGA Tour. He had a successful first season on the PGA Tour, winning the Jacksonville Open and finishing 29th in the money list. Jacklin won the 1969 Open Championship at Royal Lytham in July, two strokes ahead of Bob Charles. He won the 1970 U.S. Open at Hazeltine, finishing 7 strokes ahead of the runner-up. In 1972 he won again on the PGA Tour, taking the Greater Jacksonville Open after a playoff. He also won the Viyella PGA Championship at Wentworth, and came close to winning the Open Championship, when he lost to Lee Trevino after Trevino had chipped in at the 71st hole, while Jacklin three-putted from 15 feet. Jacklin chose not to play on the PGA Tour in 1973 and 1974, playing mostly on the European Tour where he won three times. In early 1975 he moved to Jersey for tax reasons and returned to the PGA Tour. However, he had less success than previously and again dropped off the tour. He returned to the European tour, playing on that tour until 1984. After turning 50, Jacklin played on the Senior PGA Tour from 1994 to 1997, winning twice. He also played on the European Seniors Tour.

Jacklin played in seven successive Ryder Cup matches from 1967 to 1979. He was never on the winning side, although the 1969 contest was tied. Later he was the European Ryder Cup captain from 1983 to 1989; Europe winning two and halving another of these four events.

== Early life ==
Jacklin was born on 7 July 1944 in the town of Scunthorpe, North Lincolnshire, the son of Arthur and Doris Jacklin. He had a sister, Lynn. His father was a lorry driver and introduced Jacklin to golf. Jacklin attended Henderson Avenue Primary School in the town, and later the Doncaster Road Secondary School. Doris died in 1992, while Arthur died in 1996.

== Amateur career ==
Jacklin won the Lincolnshire junior championship four times, from 1958 to 1961. In 1958 he won with a 36-hole gross score of 162, playing off a handicap of 12. By August 1961 he had a handicap of 3 and won for the fourth successive time, with a score of 138, 20 strokes ahead of the runner-up. Later in the month Jacklin competed in the Boys Amateur Championship at Dalmahoy. He was selected for two team matches before the championship, competing for a combined England and Scotland team against the Continent of Europe and, the following day, for England in their annual boys match against Scotland. In the boys championship itself, he lost at the last-64 stage to Hans-Hubert Giesen. Jacklin won the Lincolnshire Open in September 1961, 8 strokes ahead of the runner-up. His father also competed in the event.

== Professional career ==
=== British PGA ===
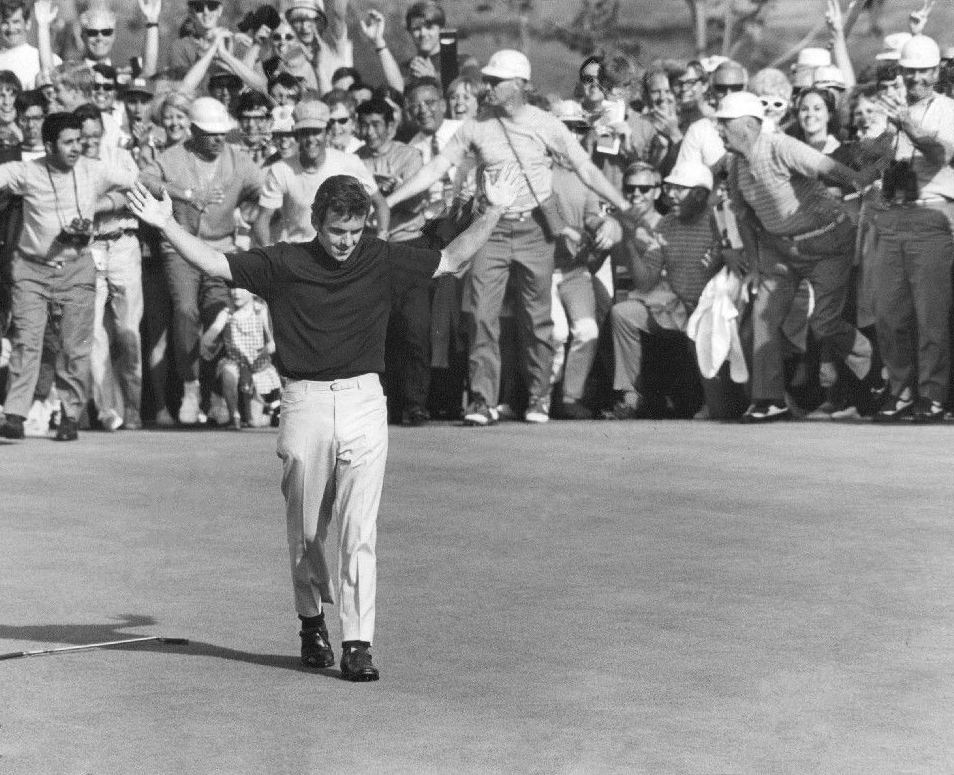
Jacklin at the 1970 U.S. Open

At the start of 1962 Jacklin turned professional, becoming an assistant to Bill Shankland at Potters Bar Golf Club. Jacklin qualified for the 1963 Open Championship at Royal Lytham. He played at Fairhaven where 39 places were available. Jacklin had rounds of 77 and 70 to qualify; those on 148 had to play off for places. In the championship itself Jacklin had rounds of 73 and 72 to make the cut comfortably and then had rounds of 76 and 74 on the last day to finish in a tie for 30th place. Later in 1963 he reached the last-32 of the News of the World Match Play before losing to Malcolm Gregson at the 20th hole, and was runner-up, with Gregson, in the Coombe Hill Assistants' Tournament. At the end of 1963 he was chosen by Henry Cotton as his Rookie of the Year. Having been runner-up in 1963, Jacklin won the 1964 Coombe Hill Assistants' Tournament, a stroke ahead of Adrian Sadler. The event was played at Hill Barn near Worthing. He also had good performance in the Blaxnit (Ulster) Tournament which was played in Belfast. Jacklin finished tied for 3rd place after a last round 65.

Jacklin played in South Africa in early 1965 but had little success. He received an entry into the 1965 Carling World Open, played in the United States in August, which had a $35,000 first prize. Jacklin made the cut, finished tied for 35th place and won $1,000 in prize money. However weather meant that the event did not finish until the Monday and Jacklin was due to play in the Gor-Ray Cup, the Assistants' Championship, the following day, at Hartsbourne. Jacklin arranged a late tee-off time and, after opening rounds of 73 and 74. he had two rounds of 68 on the final day and won the championship after a sudden-death playoff. The following week he reached the semi-finals of the News of the World Match Play and in October he was third in the Piccadilly Medal. Jacklin finished the season 12th in the Order of Merit.

In early 1966 Jacklin made his second visit to South Africa. The visit was more successful that his first, with a third place finish in the South African Masters and a joint victory in the Kimberley 4000 Tournament, to put him in 4th place in the money list with £903. In 1966 Jacklin won the Blaxnit (Ulster) Tournament by 5 strokes and was runner-up in the Rediffusion Tournament in Jersey. He finished 5th in the Order of Merit and won £2,715 on the circuit. Jacklin was selected, together with Peter Alliss, for the England team for the 1966 Canada Cup in Japan, the pair finishing in 10th place. He then travelled to New Zealand to play on the circuit there. He was runner-up in the Wattie's Tournament behind Bob Charles, and was a joint winner, with Charles, of the Forest Products Tournament. He finished 5th in the prize money list with £905. Jacklin stayed in New Zealand and won the 1967 New Zealand PGA Championship in early January, beating Martin Roesink by 6 strokes in an 18-hole playoff. He then played in a few events in Australia, where he was joint third in the Victorian Open, before playing a number of events on the 1967 Far East Circuit, including a runner-up finish in the Thailand Open, before travelled to the United States to play in the 1967 Masters for which he had received an invitation. Jacklin was tied for 7th place after three rounds but a final round 77 dropped him into a tie for 16th place.

Jacklin won twice on the 1967 British PGA circuit, the Pringle of Scotland Tournament and the Dunlop Masters, and he finished 5th, behind Roberto De Vicenzo, in the 1967 Open Championship. In the Dunlop Masters he had a hole-in-one at the 16th hole of the final round, televised live. He played a few events on the PGA Tour and finished tied for 7th in the Carling World Open in Canada. In early October, Jacklin played in the 1967 PGA Tour Qualifying School, an 8-round event with 30 places available for the 1968 PGA Tour. Early rounds of 74-76-76 left him down the field, 18 strokes behind the leader, but he improved his position over the last 5 rounds and finished tied for 11th place, 12 shots behind the winner Bobby Cole. The following week he played in his first Ryder Cup. Selection for the 1967 Ryder Cup team was based on a points system using performances in 1966 and 1967, finishing after the 1967 Open Championship. Jacklin was in 5th place, to get a place in the 10-man team. The United States won the match by 15 points. Jacklin played with Dave Thomas on the opening two days, winning two and halving another of their matches. Jacklin played in both singles sessions on the final day, losing them both.

=== PGA Tour ===
Jacklin was successful at 1967 PGA Tour Qualifying School earning him playing privileges on the PGA Tour for the following year. He played regularly until the end of June 1968 and then returned to play a number of events in August. Early in 1968, he finished tied for 10th place in the Bing Crosby National Pro-Am and tied for 8th in the Tucson Open. In March in Florida he had more success, finishing tied for 4th in the Florida Citrus Open, joint runner-up in the Pensacola Open and winner of the Jacksonville Open in successive weeks. It was the first win by a British player in an important American event since the 1920s. His win earned him $20,000 and he also won the prize for the lowest aggregate score in the four Florida events. He finished tied for 22nd place in the Masters and had further top-10 finishes in the Tournament of Champions and the Cleveland Open. He finished the season 29th in the official money list with $58,495. Jacklin returned to Britain in July and finished tied for 18th in the Open Championship at Carnoustie. He failed to qualify for the U.S. Open after a second round 82 in his qualifying event, and didn't play in the PGA Championship, which was played the week after the Open. In October Jacklin made his debut in the Piccadilly World Match Play Championship, losing to Gary Player in the semi-finals, at the 37th hole.

The 1969 Open Championship was held at Royal Lytham in July. He had rounds of 68-70-70-72 for a total of 280, 5-under-par. Bob Charles was two strokes behind with Roberto De Vicenzo and Peter Thomson a further stroke back. All the four players scored 72 on the final day. Jacklin was the first British winner of The Open since 1951.

Jacklin was involved in one of the most memorable moments in Ryder Cup history at Royal Birkdale in the 1969 Ryder Cup, which ended in a tie. Six places in the team were allocated to the leaders of a points list after the 1969 Open Championship. Jacklin was one of the other six that were chosen by committee the following week. Jacklin played in all four pair sessions on the opening two days, winning three matches and halving the other, He played Jack Nicklaus in two singles matches on the final day, winning the morning match 4&3. In the afternoon match Jacklin made an eagle putt on the 17th to level the match. At the final hole, Nicklaus conceded Jacklin's two-foot putt, halving the match, and ending the Ryder Cup with a tied score. "The Concession" ended with the two golfers walking off the course with arms around each other's shoulders. Jacklin and Nicklaus later co-designed a golf course in Florida called The Concession Golf Club to commemorate the moment.

In the first half of 1969 Jacklin largely repeated his 1968 schedule, playing most weeks on the PGA Tour. However he had less success, with a tie for 8th place in the Doral Open and ties for 5th place in the Western Open and the Kemper Open. That year Jacklin made his first appearances in the U.S. Open, although he had to qualify for the event, and in the PGA Championship, which was played at a later date than in 1968. He finished tied for 25th place in both tournaments. He returned to the PGA tour in mid-October to play in the Sahara Invitational and had another 5th place finish. He won $3,850, a sum that lifted him to 60th in the official money list with $33,036 and meant he was exempt from qualifying for PGA Tour events in 1970.

In 1970 Jacklin won his second major title, the U.S. Open by seven strokes on a windblown Hazeltine National Golf Club course. The win gave him a 10-year exemption from pre-qualifying for PGA Tour events.

As previously Jacklin played on the PGA Tour in the first half of the year. He had a number of high finishes. He lost in a playoff to Pete Brown in the Andy Williams San Diego Open after taking a bogey five at the first playoff hole. He was tied for 8th place in the Doral-Eastern Open, tied for 4tn in the Monsanto Open, third in the Greater Jacksonville Open and joint runner-up in the Tournament of Champions. The also had a good finish in the 1970 Masters Tournament, finishing tied for 12th place. He returned to the tour in August but performed badly, missing the cut in the PGA Championship. He finished the year at 20th place in the money list with $87,859. Defending his title, Jacklin finished solo 5th in the 1970 Open Championship at St Andrews, three strokes behind the leaders. He had some success in Europe towards the end of the year. He was runner-up to Christy O'Connor in the John Player Classic, winning £10,000, won the W.D. & H.O. Wills Tournament, lost to Jack Nicklaus in the semi-final of the Piccadilly World Match Play and won the Lancome Trophy. He also played with Peter Butler in the World Cup in Argentina, the English team finishing tied for 7th place.

Jacklin played on the PGA Tour in the first half of 1971, but had less success that previously. His only top-10 finish was tied for 7th place in the Greater Greensboro Open. He finished the year with winnings of $19,977, leaving him in 102nd place in the money list. Jacklin again did well in the Open Championship at Royal Birkdale, finishing solo third, two stroke behind the winner, Lee Trevino. On the British circuit he won the Benson & Hedges Festival in August, beating Peter Butler in a playoff. Jacklin was again a committee choice for the Ryder Cup team in St. Louis. Jacklin played twice with Brian Huggett on the opening day, winning one match and halving the other, as the team took a narrow lead. However the United States dominated the second day and won comfortably. Jacklin partnered Peter Oosterhuis in the 1971 World Cup in Florida, the England team finishing tied for 6th place.

In 1972 Jacklin had a much better season on the PGA Tour, compared to 1971. He was tied for 6th place in the Bing Crosby National Pro-Am before being tied for 4th in both the Phoenix Open and the Jackie Gleason's Inverrary Classic in successive weeks. He then won the Greater Jacksonville Open after a playoff against John Jacobs. Jacobs failed to make a par at the first extra hole. It was Jacklin's second win in the event. He was tied for 7th in the Greater Greensboro Open, the weeks before the Masters. He finished the season in 35th place in the money list with $65,976.

Jacklin suffered a devastating near-miss in the 1972 Open Championship at Muirfield. Tied for the lead with playing partner Lee Trevino playing the 71st hole, Jacklin had a straightforward 15-foot birdie putt on the par-5 hole, while Trevino was not yet on the green after four struggling strokes. But Trevino holed a difficult chip shot, and Jacklin took three putts, leaving him one shot behind. Trevino parred the final hole to win, but Jacklin bogeyed, finishing third behind Jack Nicklaus. Jacklin was just 28 years old at the time, but never seriously contended again in a major championship. In 2013, Jacklin said of his experience in the 1972 Open: "I was never the same again after that. I didn't ever get my head around it – it definitely knocked the stuffing out of me somehow."

After the Open Championship, Jacklin played in a number of events in Europe. He was runner-up in the Swiss Open but then withdrew from the PGA Championship. He won the Viyella PGA Championship by 3 strokes from Peter Oosterhuis, and had three other top-5 finishes in British tournaments including being runner-up to Bob Charles in the Dunlop Masters. At the end of the year Jacklin was in Australia for the 1972 World Cup. Playing with Guy Hunt the England team finished in 6th place. The previous week he had won the Dunlop International at Yarra Yarra.

=== European Tour ===
Jacklin had a poor start to the 1973 PGA Tour and was disqualified in the Dean Martin Tucson Open in January, after failing to enter a score for the final hole. He largely gave up playing on the PGA Tour until the end of 1974. He continued to play in major championships, but In 1973 he only played one other event on the tour, to defend the Greater Jacksonville Open, and only two in 1974. His money winnings were $7,182 in 1973 and $2,041 in 1974, leaving him in 167th and 215th places. He player more extensively on the European Tour in those two seasons.

In February 1973 Jacklin played on the Caribbean Tour, a short series of four tournaments. He was runner-up to Peter Oosterhuis in the Ford Maracaibo Open, and in the last event he won the Los Lagartos Open with a score of 261, 13 strokes ahead of the field. It was the third lowest score ever by a professional at a four-round tournament outside of the United States.

Jacklin played in most of the events on the 1973 European Tour. He won two events, the Italian Open and the Dunlop Masters. He was also runner-up in the French Open, the Scandinavian Enterprise Open and the John Player Classic. Jacklin won £7,000 for his Italian Open win and £7,500 for being runner-up in the John Player Classic and led the prize money list for the season. However he only finished 7th in the points list for the Order of Merit. Selection for the Great Britain and Ireland team in the 1973 Ryder Cup at Muirfield was based on a points list with points earned over a 12 months period up to August 1973. The leading 8 in the points list were guaranteed places and Jacklin, having played most of the events in this period finished in 3rd place. Jacklin was paired with Peter Oosterhuis in all four pairs matches, winning two and halving another. In the singles he beat Tommy Aaron but lost to Billy Casper.

In February 1974 Jacklin again played on the Caribbean Tour and in the last event he successfully defended the Los Lagartos Open. He played most of the season on the 1974 European Tour. He won the Scandinavian Enterprise Open, was runner-up in the Swiss Open and was tied third in the W.D. & H.O. Wills Open Tournament. Despite having a somewhat worse season than in 1973, he again finished 7th in the Order of Merit.

Jacklin returned to the PGA Tour in 1975 but had limited success. He won $10,824 in 1975 to be 123rd in the money list. 1976 and 1977 showed some improvement with winnings of $18,071 and $29,725, to be 111th and 83rd in the list. His best finish in this period was runner-up in the 1977 Bing Crosby National Pro-Am, a stroke behind Tom Watson, earning him $22,800. He played a few events at the start of 1978, including a tied for 8th place in the Bing Crosby National Pro-Am, but withdrew from the Doral-Eastern Open in March with a wrist injury and didn't return to the tour. Jacklin continued to play some events on the European Tour. He had one win in this period, the 1976 Kerrygold International Classic where he finished a stroke ahead of Eddie Polland.

Selection for the Great Britain and Ireland team in the 1975 Ryder Cup in America was based on performances in 1975 European Tour events. Jacklin was not in the leading 8 who were guaranteed places but he was selected as one of the four remaining places. Jacklin was paired with Peter Oosterhuis in three pairs matches and with Brian Huggett in the other, winning two and halving another of his four matches. However, he lost both of his singles matches on the final day. The same system was used in 1977 at Royal Lytham, and Jacklin was again chosen for one of the four places. Jacklin halved his foursomes match, lost in the fourball and was not selected for the singles.

Jacklin didn't play on the PGA Tour from 1979 to 1984, playing mostly on the European Tour. He won the 1979 Braun German Open, the 1981 Billy Butlin Jersey Open and the 1982 Sun Alliance PGA Championship after a playoff against Bernhard Langer. In 1980 he was in a playoff for the Merseyside International Open but lost to Ian Mosey. In 1979 Jacklin was 9th in the Order of Merit but dropped to 42nd in 1980. He was 13th in 1981, 20th in 1982, 63rd in 1983 before dropping out of the top 100 in 1984. Jacklin won the Venezuela Open in late 1979.

Jacklin made his final Ryder Cup appearance in 1979, the first time continental European players were included. He finished 8th in the points list with the leading 10 gaining places automatically. Jacklin played three matches with Sandy Lyle, winning one and halving another, but lost narrowly in his singles match against Tom Kite. In 1981 Jacklin finished 12th in the points list. The selectors chose Mark James, who had finished 11th in the list, and Peter Oosterhuis, who had recently won the Canadian Open.

=== Ryder Cup captain ===
Jacklin was the non-playing captain of Europe in four consecutive Ryder Cups from 1983 to 1989. He had a 2.5–1.5 won-loss record, captaining his men to their first victory in 28 years in 1985 and to their first ever victory in the United States in 1987. He is credited with saving the competition from disappearing due to American dominance.

=== Senior career ===
Jacklin played regularly on the Senior PGA Tour from 1994 to 1997. He won twice on the tour, the First of America Classic in 1994 and the Franklin Quest Championship in 1995. He also played on the European Seniors Tour, mostly between 1998 and 2002, and was runner-up in the 1998 Jersey Seniors Open.

Jacklin has developed a golf course design business after his retirement from competition. He has designed numerous courses, including the 9-hole par 3 course of The St. Pierre Park Hotel in Guernsey.

== Personal life ==
Jacklin's first wife, Vivien Murray, was from Belfast, Northern Ireland. The couple married in 1966, eleven months after their initial meeting at a Belfast hotel, and two days after Jacklin had won the Blaxnit (Ulster) Tournament. They had three children together: Bradley, Warren and Tina. Vivien Jacklin died suddenly of a brain haemorrhage in Spain, in April 1988, aged 44. In an interview in 2002, Jacklin said: "You can't understand the anguish of losing a spouse until it happens to you. I lost my will to live after my first wife died. I contemplated doing something very terrible to myself. Eventually I recovered."

Six weeks after his first wife's death, Jacklin met a 16-year-old waitress named Donna Methven at a golf tournament in England. Jacklin later said: "I was at my lowest ebb and Donna was a shoulder to cry on." They had a two-month affair which led to front-page headlines in British tabloid newspapers. In December 1988, Jacklin married his second wife, Astrid Waagen, a Norwegian woman. They have a son called Sean, who is a professional golfer. Jacklin is also stepfather to Waagen's two children, daughter Anna May and son A.J., from her previous marriage to former Bee Gees guitarist Alan Kendall.

Jacklin was a subject of the television programme This Is Your Life in February 1970 when he was surprised by Eamonn Andrews outside Buckingham Palace after receiving his OBE which he had received in the 1970 New Year Honours.

In 1971, Jacklin said that he received death threats from a caller who also threatened to bomb his wife's family home in Belfast. The caller said that Jacklin would be shot if he played in the Gallaher Ulster Open, because his wife's family supported Ian Paisley. Jacklin withdrew from the tournament.

Jacklin said in an interview in 1989 that he was barely on speaking terms with his mother. "To get along with people I have to like them. My mother and I don't get along. I don't share the belief that blood is thicker than water. She has tried to run my life long enough," Jacklin said.

Jacklin has been hearing impaired since the 1980s and wears a hearing aid device on both sides. He is a patron of the English Deaf Golf Association.

In 2013, Jacklin took part in the eleventh series of the BBC1 Saturday night entertainment competition, Strictly Come Dancing. He was the first celebrity to be eliminated from the show.

== Awards and honours ==
- In 1963, Jacklin earned Sir Henry Cotton Rookie of the Year honors, bestowed to the top rookie on the British PGA circuit
- In 1969 and 1970, he was second in the BBC Sports Personality of the Year Award.
- Jacklin received an OBE in the 1970 New Year Honours, upgraded to a CBE in the 1990 New Year Honours.
- In 2002, he was inducted into the World Golf Hall of Fame.

== Professional wins (29) ==
=== PGA Tour wins (4) ===
Legend
Major championships (2)
Other PGA Tour (2)

| No. | Date | Tournament | Winning score | To par | Margin of victory | Runner(s)-up |
|---|---|---|---|---|---|---|
| 1 | 31 Mar 1968 | Jacksonville Open Invitational | 68-65-69-71=273 | −15 | 2 strokes | (United States) Gardner Dickinson, (United States) Don January, (United States) Chi-Chi Rodríguez, (United States) Doug Sanders, (United States) DeWitt Weaver |
| 2 | 12 Jul 1969 | The Open Championship | 68-70-70-72=280 | −4 | 2 strokes | (New Zealand) Bob Charles |
| 3 | 21 Jun 1970 | U.S. Open | 71-70-70-70=281 | −7 | 7 strokes | (United States) Dave Hill |
| 4 | 19 Mar 1972 | Greater Jacksonville Open (2) | 70-71-74-68=283 | −5 | Playoff | (United States) John Jacobs |

PGA Tour playoff record (1–1)

| No. | Year | Tournament | Opponent | Result |
|---|---|---|---|---|
| 1 | 1970 | Andy Williams-San Diego Open Invitational | (United States) Pete Brown | Lost to par on first extra hole |
| 2 | 1972 | Greater Jacksonville Open | (United States) John Jacobs | Won with par on first extra hole |

=== European Tour wins (8) ===
| No. | Date | Tournament | Winning score | To par | Margin of victory | Runner(s)-up |
|---|---|---|---|---|---|---|
| 1 | 26 Aug 1972 | Viyella PGA Championship | 71-72-68-68=279 | −9 | 3 strokes | (England) Peter Oosterhuis |
| 2 | 21 Apr 1973 | Italian Open | 71-72-70-71=284 | −4 | 1 stroke | (Spain) Valentín Barrios |
| 3 | 6 Oct 1973 | Dunlop Masters | 69-65-70-68=272 | −12 | 7 strokes | (New Zealand) Bob Charles |
| 4 | 21 Jul 1974 | Scandinavian Enterprise Open | 70-65-69-75=279 | −5 | 11 strokes | (Spain) José María Cañizares |
| 5 | 6 Jun 1976 | Kerrygold International Classic | 69-79-72-70=290 | +2 | 1 stroke | (Northern Ireland) Eddie Polland |
| 6 | 19 Aug 1979 | Braun German Open | 68-68-70-71=277 | −7 | 2 strokes | (Spain) Antonio Garrido, (United States) Lanny Wadkins |
| 7 | 21 Jun 1981 | Billy Butlin Jersey Open | 71-68-72-68=279 | −9 | 1 stroke | (West Germany) Bernhard Langer |
| 8 | 31 May 1982 | Sun Alliance PGA Championship (2) | 72-69-73-70=284 | −4 | Playoff | (West Germany) Bernhard Langer |

European Tour playoff record (1–1)

| No. | Year | Tournament | Opponent | Result |
|---|---|---|---|---|
| 1 | 1980 | Merseyside International Open | (England) Ian Mosey | Lost to par on first extra hole |
| 2 | 1982 | Sun Alliance PGA Championship | (West Germany) Bernhard Langer | Won with birdie on first extra hole |

=== New Zealand Golf Circuit wins (1) ===
| No. | Date | Tournament | Winning score | To par | Margin of victory | Runner-up |
|---|---|---|---|---|---|---|
| 1 | 11 Dec 1966 | Forest Products Tournament | 66-67-71-68=272 | −16 | Shared title with (New Zealand) Bob Charles | |

=== Other European wins (9) ===
| No. | Date | Tournament | Winning score | Margin of victory | Runner(s)-up | Ref |
|---|---|---|---|---|---|---|
| 1 | 22 May 1964 | Coombe Hill Assistants' Tournament | 68-74-71-72=285 | 1 stroke | (England) Adrian Sadler | |
| 2 | 26 Aug 1965 | Gor-Ray Cup | 73-74-68-68=283 | Playoff | (England) David Butler, (Republic of Ireland) Sean Hunt | |
| 3 | 28 May 1966 | Blaxnit (Ulster) Tournament | 72-70-71-71=284 | 5 strokes | (England) Tony Grubb | |
| 4 | 24 Jun 1967 | Pringle of Scotland Tournament | 75-70-68-70=283 | 4 strokes | (England) David Snell | |
| 5 | 16 Sep 1967 | Dunlop Masters | 69-74-67-64=274 | 3 strokes | (England) Neil Coles | |
| 6 | 12 Jul 1969 | The Open Championship | 68-70-70-72=280 | 2 strokes | (New Zealand) Bob Charles | |
| 7 | 26 Sep 1970 | W.D. & H.O. Wills Tournament | 67-65-66-69=267 | 7 strokes | (England) Peter Townsend | |
| 8 | 18 Oct 1970 | Lancome Trophy | 67-71-68=206 | 1 stroke | (United States) Arnold Palmer, (Spain) Ramón Sota | |
| 9 | 21 Aug 1971 | Benson & Hedges Festival | 73-67-72-67=279 | Playoff | (England) Peter Butler | |

=== Other Australasian wins (2) ===
| No. | Date | Tournament | Winning score | To par | Margin of victory | Runner(s)-up | Ref |
|---|---|---|---|---|---|---|---|
| 1 | 5 Nov 1972 | Dunlop International | 74-63-68-72=277 | −11 | 4 strokes | (Australia) David Graham, (Thailand) Sukree Onsham | |
| 2 | 8 Jan 1967 | New Zealand PGA Championship | 73-69-64-68=274 | −18 | Playoff | (Netherlands) Martin Roesink | |

=== South American Golf Circuit wins (1) ===
| No. | Date | Tournament | Winning score | To par | Margin of victory | Runner-up | Ref. |
|---|---|---|---|---|---|---|---|
| 1 | 9 Dec 1979 | Venezuela Open | 68-69-70-69=276 | −4 | 2 strokes | (Spain) Manuel Piñero | |

=== Caribbean Tour wins (2) ===
| No. | Date | Tournament | Winning score | To par | Margin of victory | Runner(s)-up | Ref |
|---|---|---|---|---|---|---|---|
| 1 | 25 Feb 1973 | Los Lagartos Open | 65-62-66-68=261 | −27 | 13 strokes | (United States) Gene Borek | |
| 2 | 17 Feb 1974 | Los Lagartos Open (2) | 65-69-67-72=273 | −15 | 3 strokes | (Argentina) Roberto De Vicenzo, (Argentina) Florentino Molina, (Colombia) Alberto Rivadeneira | |

=== South African wins (1) ===
| Date | Tournament | Winning score | To par | Margin of victory | Runner-up | Ref |
|---|---|---|---|---|---|---|
| 26 Feb 1966 | Kimberley 4000 Tournament | 68-69-71-65=273 | −15 | Tied | (South Africa) Harold Henning | |

=== Senior PGA Tour wins (2) ===
| No. | Date | Tournament | Winning score | To par | Margin of victory | Runner(s)-up |
|---|---|---|---|---|---|---|
| 1 | 14 Aug 1994 | First of America Classic | 68-68=136 (Note: Shortened to 36 holes due to weather.) | −8 | 1 stroke | (United States) Dave Stockton |
| 2 | 3 Sep 1995 | Franklin Quest Championship | 72-67-67=206 | −10 | 1 stroke | (United States) John Paul Cain, (South Africa) Simon Hobday, (United States) Rives McBee, (United States) Dave Stockton, (United States) Bruce Summerhays, (United States) Tom Weiskopf |

== Major championships ==
=== Wins (2) ===
| Year | Championship | 54 holes | Winning score | Margin | Runner-up |
|---|---|---|---|---|---|
| 1969 | The Open Championship | 2 shot lead | −4 (68-70-70-72=280) | 2 strokes | (New Zealand) Bob Charles |
| 1970 | U.S. Open | 4 shot lead | −7 (71-70-70-70=281) | 7 strokes | (United States) Dave Hill |

=== Results timeline ===
| Tournament | 1963 | 1964 | 1965 | 1966 | 1967 | 1968 | 1969 |
|---|---|---|---|---|---|---|---|
| Masters Tournament | | | | | T16 | T22 | CUT |
| U.S. Open | | | | | | | T25 |
| The Open Championship | T30 | | T25 | T30 | 5 | T18 | 1 |
| PGA Championship | | | | | | | T25 |

| Tournament | 1970 | 1971 | 1972 | 1973 | 1974 | 1975 | 1976 | 1977 | 1978 | 1979 |
|---|---|---|---|---|---|---|---|---|---|---|
| Masters Tournament | T12 | T36 | T27 | CUT | CUT | CUT | | | | |
| U.S. Open | 1 | CUT | T40 | T52 | CUT | CUT | | | | |
| The Open Championship | 5 | 3 | 3 | T14 | T18 | | T42 | T43 | CUT | T24 |
| PGA Championship | CUT | T30 | | T46 | T55 | | | | | |

| Tournament | 1980 | 1981 | 1982 | 1983 | 1984 | 1985 | 1986 | 1987 | 1988 | 1989 |
|---|---|---|---|---|---|---|---|---|---|---|
| Masters Tournament | | | | | | | | | | |
| U.S. Open | | | | | | | | | | |
| The Open Championship | T32 | T23 | CUT | T39 | CUT | CUT | | | CUT | CUT |
| PGA Championship | | | | | | | | | | |

| Tournament | 1990 | 1991 | 1992 | 1993 | 1994 | 1995 | 1996 | 1997 | 1998 | 1999 |
|---|---|---|---|---|---|---|---|---|---|---|
| Masters Tournament | | | | | | | | | | |
| U.S. Open | | | | | | | | | | |
| The Open Championship | | | | CUT | | | | | | CUT |
| PGA Championship | | | | | | | | | | |

| Tournament | 2000 | 2001 | 2002 | 2003 | 2004 | 2005 | 2006 | 2007 |
|---|---|---|---|---|---|---|---|---|
| Masters Tournament | | | | | | | | |
| U.S. Open | | | | | | | | |
| The Open Championship | | CUT | | | | CUT | | CUT |
| PGA Championship | | | | | | | | |

Win
Top 10
Did not play

CUT = missed the halfway cut
"T" indicates a tie for a place.

=== Summary ===
| Tournament | Wins | 2nd | 3rd | Top-5 | Top-10 | Top-25 | Events | Cuts made |
|---|---|---|---|---|---|---|---|---|
| Masters Tournament | 0 | 0 | 0 | 0 | 0 | 3 | 9 | 5 |
| U.S. Open | 1 | 0 | 0 | 1 | 1 | 2 | 7 | 4 |
| The Open Championship | 1 | 0 | 2 | 5 | 5 | 11 | 28 | 17 |
| PGA Championship | 0 | 0 | 0 | 0 | 0 | 1 | 5 | 4 |
| Totals | 2 | 0 | 2 | 6 | 6 | 17 | 49 | 30 |

== Team appearances ==
Amateur

- Boys' match v Continent of Europe (representing combined England & Scotland): 1961 (winners)
- England–Scotland boys match (representing England): 1961

Professional

- Ryder Cup (representing Great Britain & Ireland/Europe): 1967, 1969 (tie), 1971, 1973, 1975, 1977, 1979, 1983 (non-playing captain), 1985 (winners, non-playing captain), 1987 (winners, non-playing captain), 1989 (tied, retained Cup, non-playing captain)
- World Cup (representing England): 1966, 1970, 1971, 1972
- Double Diamond International (representing England): 1972 (winners), 1973, 1974, 1976 (winners, captain), 1977 (captain)
- Marlboro Nations' Cup (representing England): 1972, 1973
- Hennessy Cognac Cup (representing Great Britain and Ireland): 1976 (winners, captain), 1982 (winners, captain)
- UBS Cup (representing the Rest of the World): 2003 (tie, captain)

== See also ==
- 1967 PGA Tour Qualifying School graduates
- List of golfers with most European Tour wins
