= Pelaco Tournament =

Tournament information
- Location: Australia
- Established: 1955
- Final year: 1959

Final champion
- Peter Thomson

The Pelaco Tournament was a golf tournament held in Australia from 1955 to 1959. Peter Thomson won the event four of the five times it was contested. Total prize money for the 90-hole tournament was £2,500. The sponsor was Pelaco, an Australian shirt manufacturer.

== Winners ==
Year	Winner	Country	Venue	Score	Margin of victory	Runner(s)-up	Winner's share (A£)	Ref
1955	Peter Thomson	Australia	Commonwealth Golf Club	366	5 strokes	(Australia) Kel Nagle (Australia) Ossie Pickworth	1,000	
1956	Peter Thomson (2)	Australia	The Australian Golf Club	349	7 strokes	(Australia) Frank Phillips	1,000	
1957	Bruce Crampton	Australia	Victoria Golf Club	354	1 stroke	(Australia) Frank Phillips (South Africa) Gary Player	650	
1958	Peter Thomson (3)	Australia	The Australian Golf Club	342	6 strokes	(South Africa) Gary Player	650	
1959	Peter Thomson (4)	Australia	Victoria Golf Club	339	7 strokes	(Australia) Kel Nagle	650	
