= Ron Cerrudo =

American professional golfer (1945–2024)

Personal information
- Full name: Ronald John Cerrudo
- Nationality: United States
- Born: February 4, 1945 Palo Alto, California, U.S.
- Died: April 24, 2024 (aged 79) South Carolina, U.S.
- Height: 5 ft 11.5 in (1.82 m)
- Weight: 180 lb (82 kg; 13 st)

Career
- Sport: Golf
- College: Chabot Community College; San Jose State University
- Turned professional: 1967
- Former tour: PGA Tour
- Professional wins: 4

Number of wins by tour
- PGA Tour: 2
- Other: 2

Best results in major championships
- Masters Tournament: T46: 1967
- PGA Championship: T21: 1969
- U.S. Open: T30: 1974
- The Open Championship: CUT: 1974

Ronald John Cerrudo (February 4, 1945 – April 24, 2024) was an American professional golfer who played on the PGA Tour and later worked as a club teaching professional.

== Early life and amateur career ==
Cerrudo was born in Palo Alto, California. He attended Chabot Community College and San Jose State University, and was a member of the golf team at both institutions. He was a two-time All-American at San Jose State and played on the Walker Cup team in 1967. He finished runner-up in the 1967 British Amateur, losing 2 and 1 to fellow American Bob Dickson.

== Professional career ==
Cerrudo turned pro and joined the PGA Tour in 1967. He played on the PGA Tour from 1967 to 1979. He won two events: the 1968 Cajun Classic Open Invitational and the 1970 San Antonio Open Invitational. His best finish in a major was a T-21 at the 1969 PGA Championship.

From 1979, Cerrudo was employed as a club teaching professional at various clubs in South Carolina. From 1979–1996, he was the head teaching pro at Shipyard Golf Club on Hilton Head Island, South Carolina. From 1996 to 2002, he was the head teaching pro at Port Royal Golf Club also on Hilton Head. From 2002, he was the Director of Instruction for The Ron Cerrudo Learning Center at the Daniel Island Club in Charleston, South Carolina. He also did some on-course commentator radio work, and was the featured speaker at various corporate outings.

== Death ==
Cerrudo died on April 24, 2024, at the age of 79.

== Amateur wins ==
- 1961 California Junior Championship
- 1962 California Junior Championship
- 1964 Santa Clara County Championship, California Amateur Northern Regionals, California Amateur Championship

== Professional wins (4) ==
=== PGA Tour wins (2) ===
| No. | Date | Tournament | Winning score | Margin of victory | Runner-up |
|---|---|---|---|---|---|
| 1 | Nov 24, 1968 | Cajun Classic Open Invitational | −18 (69-67-66-68=270) | 4 strokes | (United States) Charlie Sifford |
| 2 | Feb 22, 1970 | San Antonio Open Invitational | −7 (71-65-69-68=273) | 5 strokes | (United States) Dick Lotz |

=== Other wins (2) ===
- 1972 Moroccan Open
- 1992 Carolinas PGA Championship

== U.S. national team appearances ==
Amateur

- Eisenhower Trophy: 1966
- Walker Cup: 1967 (winners)

== See also ==
- 1967 PGA Tour Qualifying School graduates
