= The St. Pierre Park Hotel =

Hotel in Saint Peter Port, Guernsey

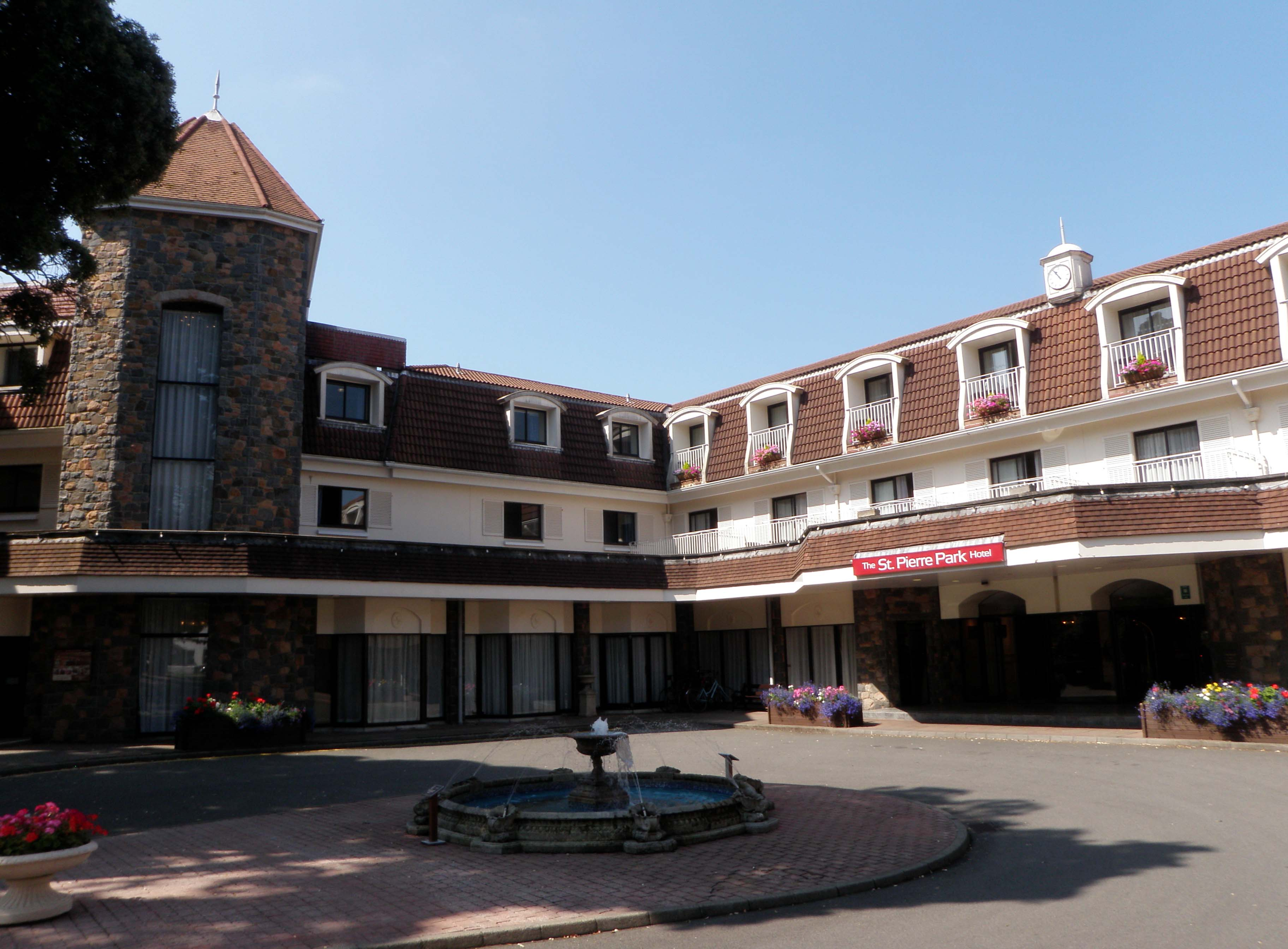
- Outside the entrance of the hotel

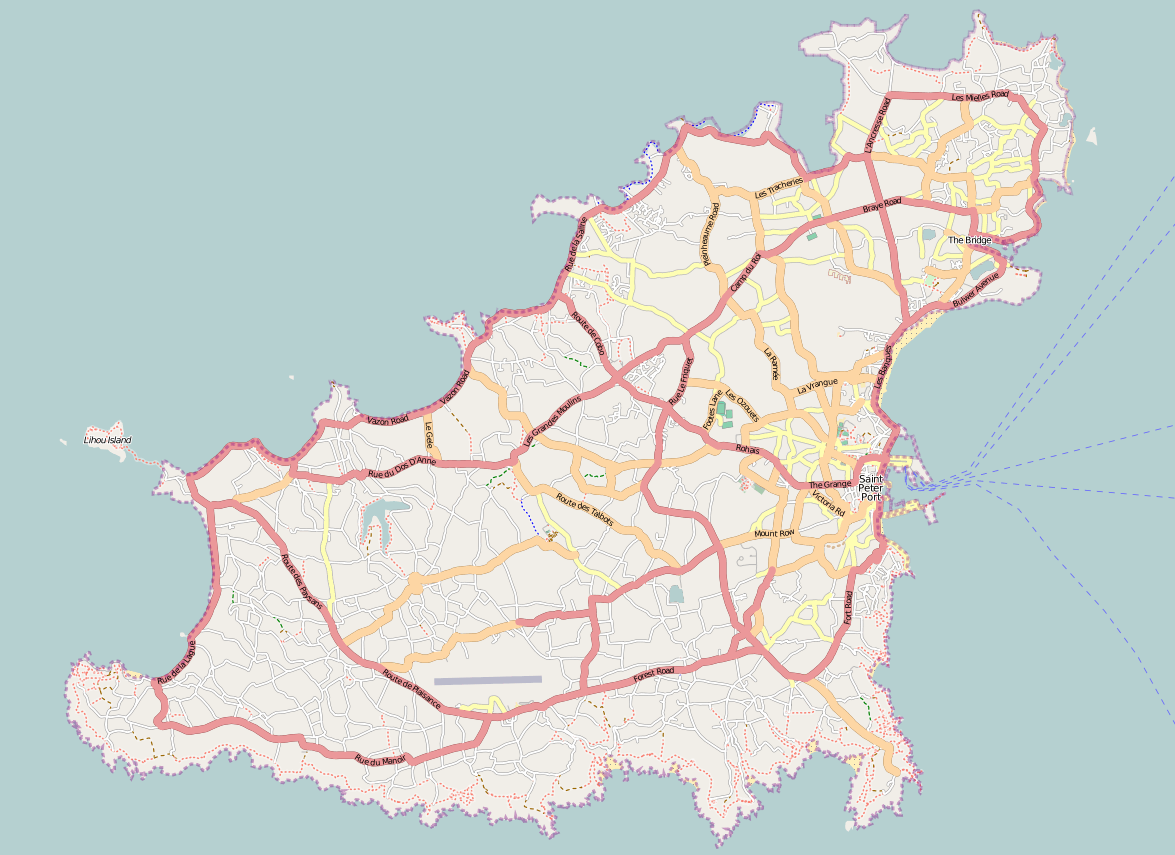
- Location in Guernsey

General information
- Location: Saint Peter Port, Guernsey
- Coordinates: 49°27′29″N 2°33′42″W

Website
- www.stpierrepark.co.uk

The St. Pierre Park Hotel or St. Pierre Park Hotel & Golf is a hotel and golf course in Saint Peter Port, Guernsey. The hotel is set in 45 acres of mature parkland and contains a 9-hole par 3 golf course (St. Pierre Park Golf Club) designed by Tony Jacklin, 3 tennis courts and a health suite named Le Mirage Health Spa. The hotel is served by The Renoir Restaurant, overlooking the lake and garden of the hotel.
