= Cedric Amm =

South African professional golfer (born 1940)

Personal information
- Nationality: South Africa
- Born: 5 December 1940 (age 85)
- Height: 6 ft (183 cm)

Career
- Sport: Golf
- Turned professional: 1961

Number of wins by tour
- Major tour wins: 3

Best results in major championships
- Masters Tournament: DNP
- PGA Championship: DNP
- U.S. Open: DNP
- The Open Championship: CUT: 1965

Cedric Amm (born 5 December 1940) is a South African professional golfer. Amm turned pro in 1961 and quickly had success, winning the Natal Open three years later. Gary Player soon hailed him as "the hottest golfing sensation to come out of my country in five years." In the mid-1960s, Amm continued to play well, recording a number of second- and third-place finishes on the New Zealand Golf Circuit. In 1966, Amm won the South African Masters, the biggest win of his career. Amm did not have much success in the late 1960s, however, and retired from golf. Thereafter he has worked as a horse breeder and trained some champion horses.

== Professional career ==
In the early 1960s, Amm turned pro. He began his career as an assistant pro at Mowbray Club in Cape Town, South African. In 1961, he first received media attention for his play at the Western Province Open. He opened with rounds of 70 to tie Retief Waltman for the lead.

In 1963, Amm started playing internationally. As of February, he was scheduled to play on the Far East Circuit. Late in the month, he received some attention for tying for the win with his teammate at the Malayan Open pro-am. In April, he started playing on the British PGA. Late in the year, Amm played the Natal Open in his home country. He finished the tournament at 291, with the clubhouse lead. However, on the final hole Bobby Verwey holed a 15-foot eagle putt to tie. There would be a 36-hole playoff the following day to decide the title. Amm would go on to win the event. Later in the season, Amm finished third place at the Cock o' the North tournament. During this era, Gary Player described him as "the hottest golfing sensation to come out of my country in five years."

In 1964 and 1965, he continued to play internationally. As of May 1964, he had returned to Britain. In the middle of the year, he played a number of PGA Tour events. In November, he started playing the New Zealand Golf Circuit. Late in the month, he recorded a third-place finish at the Metalcraft Tournament. Amm, however, abruptly "cut short" his tour of New Zealand before the season was over to return to South Africa. In February 1965, he finished solo second at the South African Masters. In March, he played the Flame Lily golf tournament in Rhodesia. Amm finished regulation tied with Cobie Legrange and a sudden death playoff ensued. Amm holed a "tremendous" 40-foot putt on the first playoff hole to earn the championship. He was referred to as "one of South Africa's leading golfers" in the mid-1960s.

Over the course of the 1965-66 southern hemisphere summer, Amm had much success across the world. Early in the season, he played the New Zealand Golf Circuit again. In November, he played the Caltex Tournament at the par-73 Paraparaumu Beach Golf Links in Paraparaumu, New Zealand. In the second round he scored a "fantastic" 64, including two eagles, to break Gary Player's course record. "This 64 is my best championship round," he told reporters after the round. He finished in joint second. The following week, at the Forest Products Tournament, Amm again recorded a runner-up finish, one back of Kel Nagle. Later in the month, he recorded a solo third-place finish at the New Zealand Wills Masters. Shortly thereafter, he returned to South Africa. In February 1966, at the South African Masters, Amm "led throughout" and won easily, defeating Trevor Wilkes by four strokes. During this era, he was sponsored by fellow South African Gary Player. He continued to work as an assistant pro at Mowbray.

Late in his career, Amm recorded a few highlights. In January 1967, Amm was in contention at the General Motors Open; he was in joint third at the midway point. Two months later, Amm opened with a 70 to tie for the lead at the Flame Lily Open golf tournament. In January 1969, at the Western Province Open, he opened with a 65 (−6) to hold solo second place, three back of Brian Barnes. He shot a 72 the following day but moved closer the lead as Barnes struggled.

Since leaving the golf industry, Amm has worked as a horse breeder. In 2013, his horse Pan Amm won a significant event in Kenilworth, South Africa.

== Personal life ==
Amm is married to Barbara.

== Professional wins (3) ==
=== Rhodesian circuit wins (1) ===
- 1965 Flame Lily golf tournament

=== Other wins (2) ===
- 1964 Natal Open
- 1966 South African Masters

== Results in major championships ==
Tournament	1965
The Open Championship	CUT

CUT = missed the halfway cut

Note: Amm only played in The Open Championship.

== Team appearances ==
- British Isles and Commonwealth v. the Rest of the World (representing the Rest of the World): 1966
