= New Zealand Wills Masters =

Tournament information
- Location: Christchurch, New Zealand
- Established: 1965
- Course: Russley Golf Club
- Par: 73
- Tour: New Zealand Golf Circuit
- Format: Stroke play
- Prize fund: NZ$4,000
- Month played: December
- Final year: 1967

Tournament record score
- Aggregate: 275 Peter Thomson (1966); 275 Tim Woolbank (1966)
- To par: −17 as above

Final champion
- (New Zealand) Bob Charles and (Netherlands) Martin Roesink
- Location in New Zealand

The New Zealand Wills Masters was a golf tournament held in New Zealand played from 1965 to 1967. The Wills Classic had been held in New Zealand in 1963 and 1964. A Wills Masters tournament was also held in Australia from 1963. The tournament had prize money of NZ£2,000 in 1966 and NZ$4,000 in 1967. The event was part of the New Zealand Golf Circuit. The sponsor was W.D. & H.O. Wills, a cigarette manufacturer.

== Winners ==
Year	Winner	Score	To par	Margin of victory	Runner(s)-up	Ref.
1967	(New Zealand) Bob Charles (Netherlands) Martin Roesink	278	−14	Title shared		
1966	(Australia) Peter Thomson (Australia) Tim Woolbank	275	−17	Title shared		
1965	(Australia) Geoff Donald	276	−16	5 strokes	(Australia) Kel Nagle	
