= La Moye Golf Club =

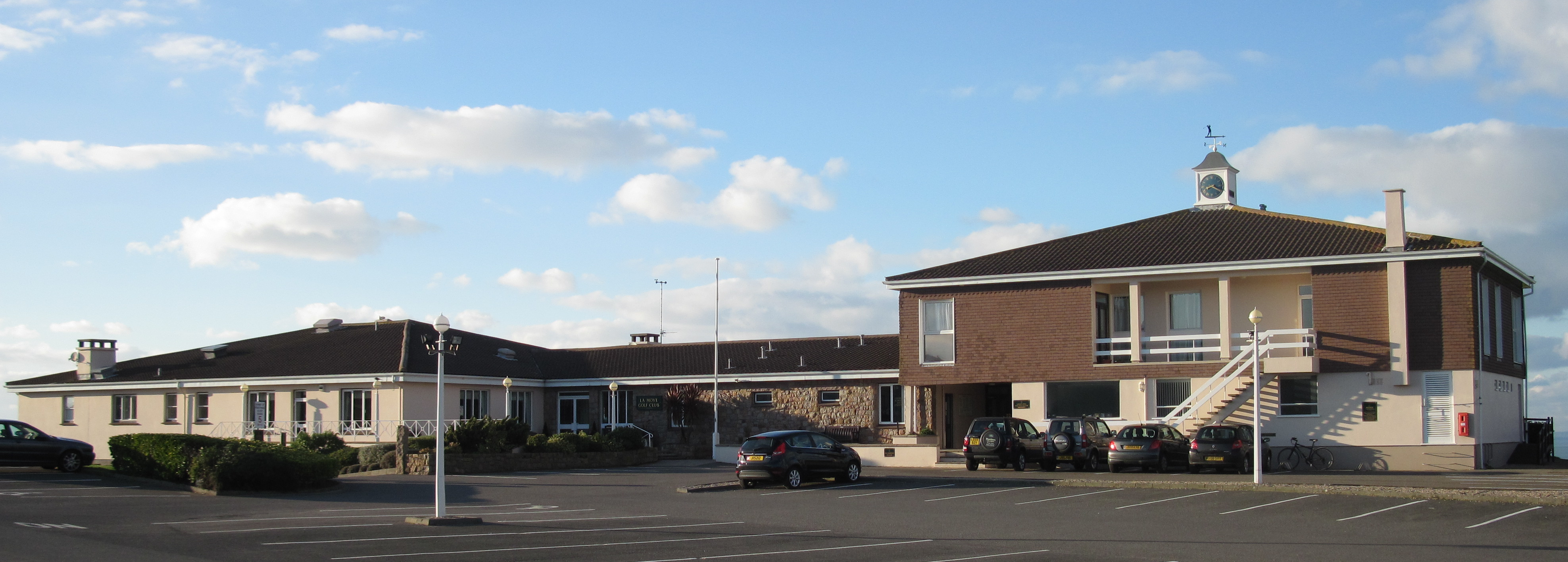

- Location within Jersey
- 49°11′33″N 2°13′06″W

Club information
- Location: Saint Brélade, Jersey
- Established: 1902
- Type: Private
- Total holes: 18
- Tournaments: Rediffusion Tournament (1963–66); Jersey Seniors Classic (1996–2010); Jersey Open (1978–95)
- Website: www.lamoyegolfclub.co.uk
- Designed by: George Boomer (1902); James Braid (1930s); Henry Cotton (1970s)
- Par: 72
- Length: 6,797 yards

La Moye Golf Club is a private golf club located in Saint Brélade on the south-west coast of the island of Jersey, the largest of the Channel Islands.

The club has hosted several prestigious tournaments including the Rediffusion Tournament from 1963 to 1966, the Jersey Open on the European Tour between 1978 and 1995, and the Jersey Seniors Classic on the European Senior Tour since 1996.

== History ==
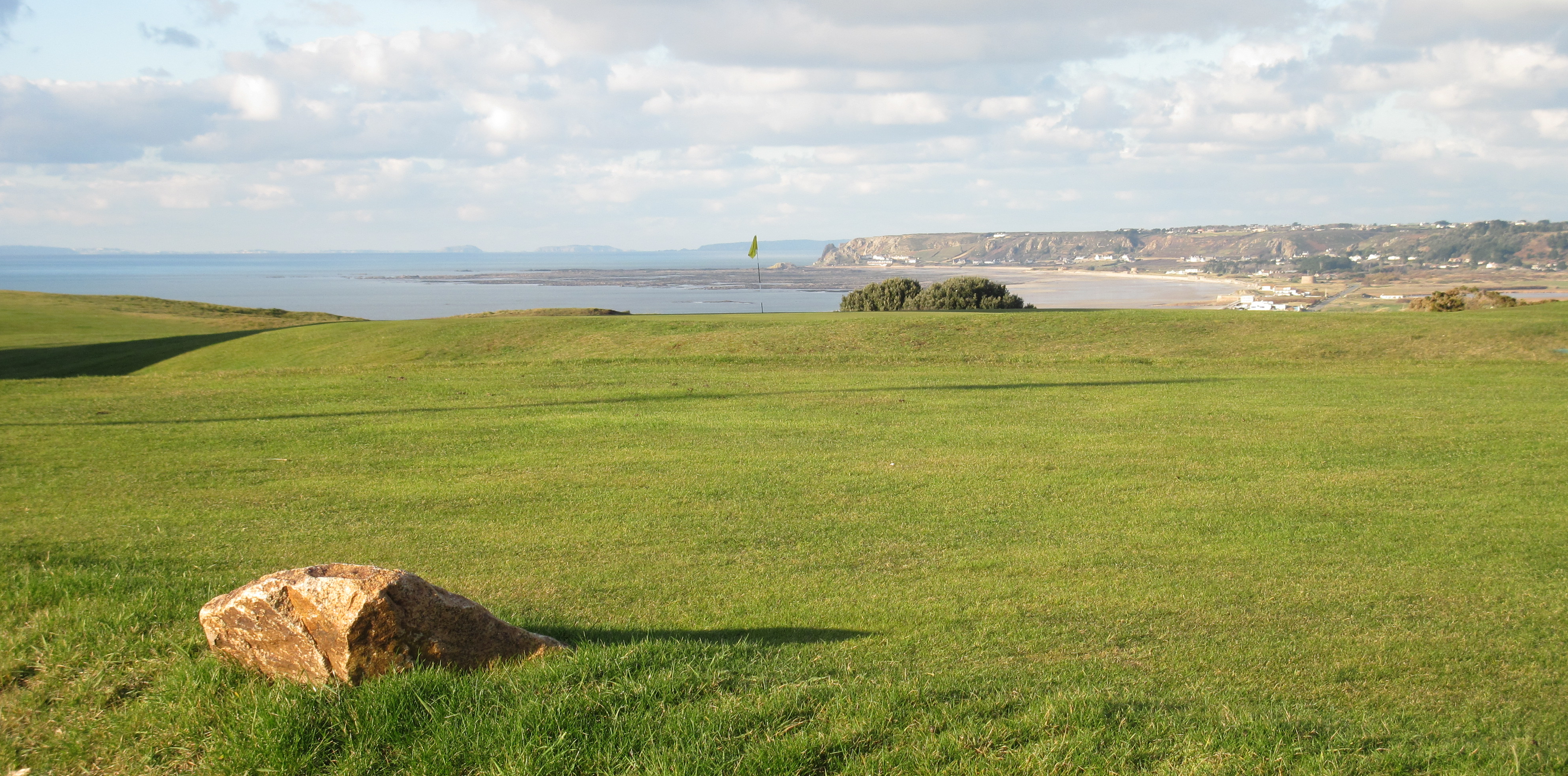
The golf course at La Moye overlooks Saint Ouen's Bay - here seen with Guernsey, Sark and other islands in the background

The original golf course at La Moye was laid out by George Boomer in 1902, who was the schoolmaster of future British Open champions Harry Vardon and Ted Ray as well as his son Aubrey, after he had been turned away from Royal Jersey Golf Club. The course was redesigned by renowned golf course architect James Braid in the early 1930s, and was reopened by Vardon.

The course was virtually laid waste during the World War II occupation of Jersey by the German Army. Major renovations took place during the 1960s and 70s under the guidance of Henry Cotton, and the course went on to play host to some of the world's top golfers as the venue for tournaments on both the European Tour and the European Seniors Tour. In 2011 Golf Course Manager Richard Cutler led the start of a major redevelopment of the course. During 2024 work began on a second redevelopment project, including two new holes on the course's back nine.
