= Peter Thomson (golfer) =

Australian professional golfer (1929–2018)

Peter Thomson AO CBE
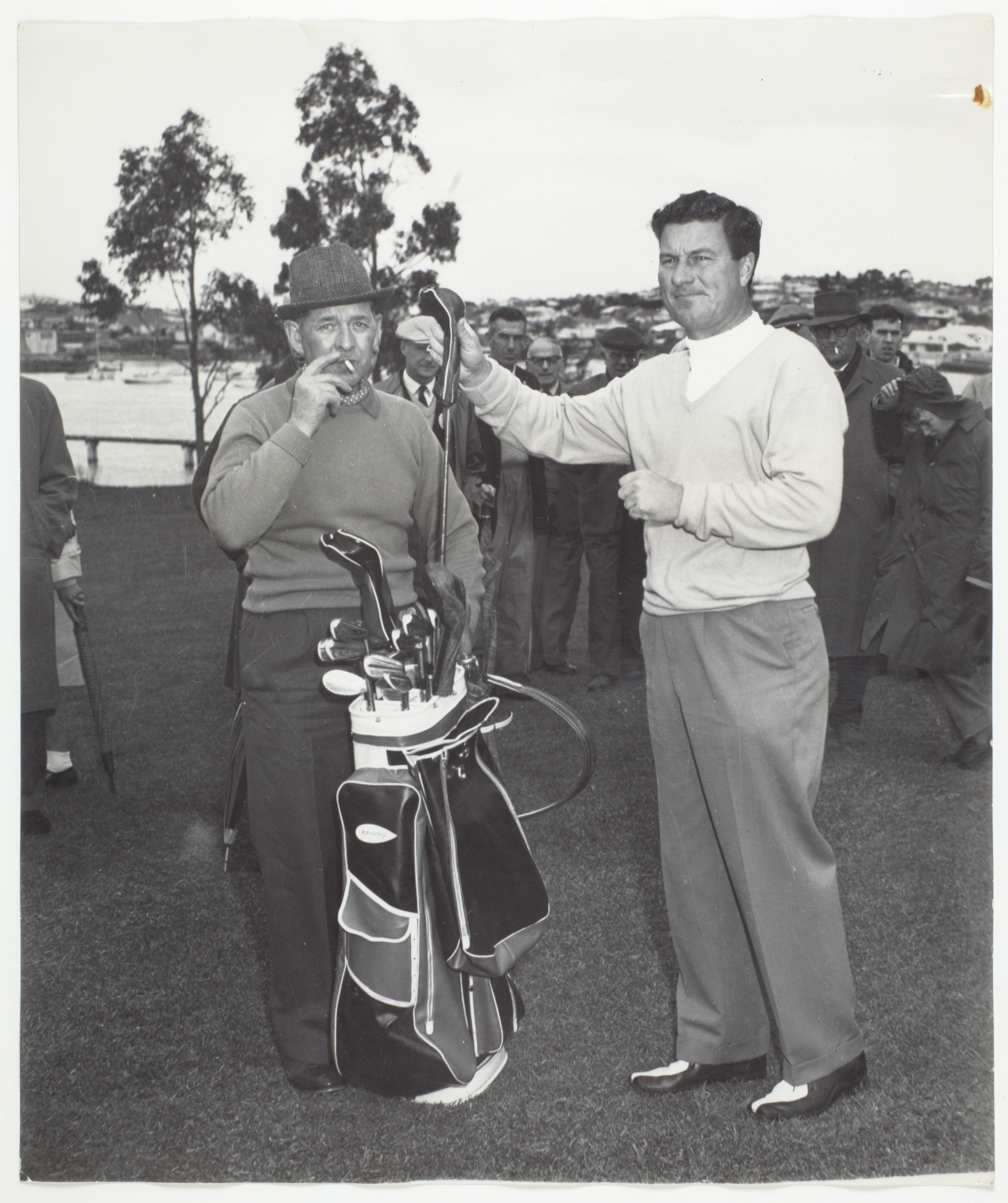
- Thomson in Tasmania

Personal information
- Full name: Peter William Thomson
- Nickname: The Melbourne Tiger
- Nationality: Australia
- Born: 23 August 1929 Brunswick, Victoria, Australia
- Died: 20 June 2018 (aged 88) Melbourne, Victoria, Australia
- Height: 1.77 m (5 ft 10 in)
- Spouses: Lois Brauer (m. 1952) Mary Kelly (m. 1960)
- Children: 4, including Andrew

Career
- Sport: Golf
- Turned professional: 1949
- Former tours: PGA Tour; European Tour; Asia Golf Circuit; PGA Tour of Australia; New Zealand Golf Circuit; Senior PGA Tour
- Professional wins: 105

Number of wins by tour
- PGA Tour: 6
- European Tour: 1
- Japan Golf Tour: 1
- PGA Tour of Australasia: 1
- PGA Tour Champions: 11
- Other: 47 (Australia/New Zealand); 28 (Europe); 10 (Asia/Japan); 2 (other regular); 1 (other senior)

Best results in major championships (wins: 5)
- Masters Tournament: 5th: 1957
- PGA Championship: DNP
- U.S. Open: T4: 1956
- The Open Championship: Won: 1954, 1955, 1956, 1958, 1965

Achievements and awards
- World Golf Hall of Fame: 1988 (member page)
- Far East Circuit Order of Merit winner: 1962
- New Zealand Golf Circuit money list winner: 1965
- Senior PGA Tour money list winner: 1985

Peter William Thomson AO, CBE (23 August 1929 – 20 June 2018) was an Australian professional golfer, often cited as the greatest and most successful golfer in Australian golf history. In the late 1940s, Thomson turned professional and immediately had success on the Australasian circuits, then posted his first international win at the 1950 New Zealand Open followed by the 1951 Australian Open.

From the time he turned professional in 1949, Thomson won at least one tournament every year for the next 20 years, including 27 'National Opens'. Thomson won professional championships in Australia, New Zealand, Japan, Philippines, England, Scotland, Germany, Italy, Spain, South Africa, Canada, India, Hong Kong and the United States. In the United Kingdom, Thomson had extraordinary success, winning dozens of tournaments on the British PGA circuit, including the Open Championship five times.

As a senior, Thomson continued with success, winning 11 times on the Senior PGA Tour in the United States, including a record nine times in one season, 1985, a record he holds with Hale Irwin.

== Early life ==
Thomson was born in Brunswick, a northern suburb of Melbourne, Australia.

== Professional career ==
Thomson's Open Championship wins came in 1954, 1955, 1956, 1958, and 1965. He was the only man to win the tournament for three consecutive years in the 20th century.

Thomson was a prolific tournament champion around the world, winning the national championships of ten countries, including the New Zealand Open nine times.

He competed on the American PGA Tour from 1953 to 1957, playing 74 events and only missing 3 cuts (all in 1954).

With one win, several runner-up finishes and over a dozen top-10 finishes, Thomson decided he preferred the 'tour' (and the golf courses) in the UK/Europe and chose to travel from Australia to play his summer season in the UK, rather than the US from 1958 onward.

His best year in the US was in 1956, playing in just eight events, he won the Texas International Open, and achieved his best finish in one of the three majors staged in the United States (fourth at the U.S. Open), to finish ninth on the money list.

In the era that Thomson won his first four Open Championships, few of the leading professionals from the United States travelled to Britain to play in that event. At that time, the prize money in the Open was insufficient for an American to cover their expenses. However, Thomson demonstrated with his win in 1965 that he could beat a field of the world's best players, as that victory came against a field that included Arnold Palmer, Jack Nicklaus and Tony Lema, three of the top four American golfers from the 1964 money list. Peter Thomson put on a ball-striking clinic at Royal Birkdale in 1965, where, in the final 18 holes he took 71 shots that included 35 putts.

Thomson continued on his winning ways, after his historic fifth British Open victory at Royal Birkdale in 1965, hoisting championship trophies in Australia, Japan, Hong Kong, India, New Zealand and several more victories in the UK before a wrist injury in 1975, in Bangkok, slowed his performance. Thomson had slept in cold air-conditioned comfort the night previous, sprung out of bed and hastily made his way to his tee time. The first shot he hit was a driver off the first tee and he said "I heard the tendon in my left wrist snap - it went off like a rubber band." He withdrew from that championship on the 1st hole, rested the wrist for 3 weeks and then damaged it further by returning to golf too soon. In his own words "truthfully the left wrist has never been any good since."

Thomson then enjoyed a successful senior career in the US. In 1985 he won nine times on the Senior PGA Tour in the United States, and finished top of the money list. 9 wins in one season is a record Thomson still holds, along with Hale Irwin who won 9 times in 1997. His last tournament victory came at the 1988 British PGA Seniors Championship.

He was president of the Australian PGA from 1962 to 1994, still the longest serving president. (He was president of the Australian PGA at the same time he won The British Open in 1965)

He served as the non-playing captain of the victorious International Team in the 1998 Presidents Cup at Royal Melbourne and is, as of 2025, the only captain to steer the International Team to success in the competition's history.

Thomson was active as a golf writer, contributing to The Age of Melbourne for some 50 years from the early 1950s.

His home club was Victoria Golf Club. He was an honorary member of Royal Melbourne Golf Club and dozens of golf clubs around the world including several in Scotland, Japan and throughout Asia.

Following his successful playing career, Thomson began designing courses with Michael Wolveridge in the 1960s. Over 51 years, he and his business partners, including Ross Perrett, developed more than 180 courses in over 30 countries.

== Personal life ==
On June 1, 1960, Thomson was married to Mary Kelly of Melbourne, Australia. The wedding took place in London, England.

Thomson died in Melbourne on 20 June 2018 after a four-year battle with Parkinson's disease, at the age of 88.

== Awards and honors ==
- In 1955, he was selected as ABC Sportsman of the Year.
- In 1957, he was appointed Member of the Order of the British Empire (MBE) in recognition of his services to Australia in the sporting and international sphere.
- In 1979, appointed Commander of the Order of the British Empire (CBE) for service to the sport of golf.
- Thomson was inducted into the Sport Australia Hall of Fame in 1985.
- Thomson was inducted into the World Golf Hall of Fame in 1988.
- In 1997, The Peter Thomson Trophy, an annual contested between the eight Melbourne Sandbelt golf clubs, was inaugurated.
- In 2001, he was awarded the Centenary Medal.
- In 2001, he was elected an Officer of the Order of Australia (AO)
- In 2011, he was inducted into the Victorian Golf Industry Hall of Fame.
- In 2016, he was inducted as inaugural Immortal of the PGA of Australia.

== Amateur wins ==
- 1947 Australasian Foursomes Shield (with Dick Payne)
- 1948 Victorian Amateur Championship

== Professional wins (105) ==
=== PGA Tour wins (6) ===
Legend
Major championships (5)
Other PGA Tour (1)

No.	Date	Tournament	Winning score	Margin of victory	Runner(s)-up
1	9 Jul 1954	The Open Championship	−9 (72-71-69-71=283)	1 stroke	(South Africa) Bobby Locke, (Wales) Dai Rees, (England) Syd Scott
2	8 Jul 1955	The Open Championship (2)	−7 (71-68-70-72=281)	2 strokes	(Scotland) John Fallon
3	4 Jun 1956	Texas International Open	−13 (67-68-69-63=267)	Playoff	(United States) Gene Littler, (United States) Cary Middlecoff
4	6 Jul 1956	The Open Championship (3)	+2 (70-70-72-74=286)	3 strokes	(Belgium) Flory Van Donck
5	5 Jul 1958	The Open Championship (4)	−6 (66-72-67-73=278)	Playoff	(Wales) Dave Thomas
6	9 Jul 1965	The Open Championship (5)	−3 (74-68-72-71=285)	2 strokes	(Wales) Brian Huggett, (Republic of Ireland) Christy O'Connor Snr

PGA Tour playoff record (2–0)

No.	Year	Tournament	Opponent(s)	Result
1	1956	Texas International Open	(United States) Gene Littler, (United States) Cary Middlecoff	Won with birdie on second extra hole
2	1958	The Open Championship	(Wales) Dave Thomas	Won 36-hole playoff; Thomson: −3 (68-71=139), Thomas: +1 (69-74=143)

=== European Tour wins (1) ===
No.	Date	Tournament	Winning score	Margin of victory	Runner-up
1	23 Sep 1972	W.D. & H.O. Wills Tournament	−14 (71-69-66-64=270)	3 strokes	(England) Peter Butler

=== PGA of Japan Tour wins (1) ===
No.	Date	Tournament	Winning score	Margin of victory	Runners-up
1	23 May 1976	Pepsi-Wilson Tournament	−5 (71-72-68=211) (Note: Shortened to 54 holes due to weather.)	Playoff	(Australia) Brian Jones, (Australia) Graham Marsh, (Japan) Shozo Miyamoto

PGA of Japan Tour playoff record (1–0)

No.	Year	Tournament	Opponents	Result
1	1976	Pepsi-Wilson Tournament	(Australia) Brian Jones, (Australia) Graham Marsh, (Japan) Shozo Miyamoto	Won with par on fourteenth extra hole Jones eliminated by par on fourth hole Miyamoto eliminated by par on first hole

=== Other Japan wins (5) ===
- 1969 Chunichi Crowns
- 1971 Dunlop Tournament, Wizard Tournament
- 1972 Chunichi Crowns, Pepsi Tournament

=== Asia Golf Circuit wins (5) ===
No.	Date	Tournament	Winning score	Margin of victory	Runner-up
1	11 Mar 1962	Yomiuri International	−10 (72-68-64-74=278)	8 strokes	(Canada) Al Balding
2	23 Feb 1964	Philippine Open	−3 (74-74-69-68=285)	Playoff	(United States) Doug Sanders
3	28 Mar 1965	Hong Kong Open	−2 (75-66-67-70=278)	1 stroke	(New Zealand) Ross Newdick
4	26 Mar 1967	Hong Kong Open (2)	−7 (68-69-67-69=273)	Playoff	(Wales) Brian Huggett
5	4 Apr 1976	Indian Open	−4 (74-75-69-70=288)	1 stroke	(Australia) Brian Jones

Asia Golf Circuit playoff record (2–0)

No.	Year	Tournament	Opponent	Result
1	1964	Philippine Open	(United States) Doug Sanders	Won with bogey on first extra hole
2	1967	Hong Kong Open	(Wales) Brian Huggett	Won with par on second extra hole

=== Other Asian wins (3) ===
- 1960 Hong Kong Open
- 1964 Indian Open
- 1966 Indian Open

=== PGA Tour of Australia wins (1) ===
No.	Date	Tournament	Winning score	Margin of victory	Runners-up
1	11 Feb 1973	Victorian Open	−4 (71-73-73-67=284)	2 strokes	(Australia) Stewart Ginn, (Australia) Bob Tuohy

=== Other Australian wins (24) ===
- 1949 Victorian Close Championship
- 1951 Australian Open, Victorian Close Championship
- 1952 Victorian PGA Championship, Mobilco Tournament
- 1953 Victorian PGA Championship
- 1954 Ampol Tournament (Nov)
- 1955 Wiseman's Tournament, Pelaco Tournament, Speedo Tournament
- 1956 Pelaco Tournament
- 1958 Victorian Open, Pelaco Tournament
- 1959 Pelaco Tournament, Coles Tournament
- 1960 Wills Classic
- 1961 Adelaide Advertiser Tournament, New South Wales Open
- 1963 Lakes Open
- 1967 Australian PGA Championship, Australian Open
- 1968 South Australian Open, Victorian Open
- 1972 Australian Open

=== New Zealand Golf Circuit wins (11) ===
No.	Date	Tournament	Winning score	Margin of victory	Runner(s)-up
1	3 Sep 1963	Metalcraft Tournament	−5 (72-69-74-72=287)	Shared title with (Australia) Ted Ball	
2	1 Dec 1964	Forest Products Tournament	−11 (69-68-65=202)	1 stroke	(South Africa) Cobie Legrange, (Australia) Kel Nagle
3	21 Nov 1965	New Zealand Open	−2 (70-71-68-69=278)	8 strokes	(New Zealand) Bob Charles, (Australia) Kel Nagle
4	23 Nov 1965	Metalcraft Tournament (2)	−8 (71-68-69=208)	3 strokes	(Australia) Barry Coxon, (New Zealand) Walter Godfrey, (Australia) Alan Murray, (New Zealand) Ross Newdick
5	27 Nov 1965	Caltex Tournament	−10 (68-70-69-75=282)	2 strokes	(South Africa) Cedric Amm, (Australia) John Sullivan
6	11 Dec 1965	BP Tournament	−10 (68-66-73-71=278)	Shared title with (Australia) Kel Nagle	
7	26 Nov 1966	New Zealand Wills Masters	−17 (69-69-70-67=275)	Shared title with (Australia) Tim Woolbank	
8	17 Dec 1966	Caltex Tournament (2)	−4 (72-67-70-67=276)	Shared title with (Australia) Kel Nagle	
9	26 Nov 1967	Caltex Tournament (3)	−14 (72-70-67-69=278)	Shared title with (New Zealand) Bob Charles	
10	23 Nov 1968	Sax Altman Tournament	−3 (72-71-70-72=285)	Shared title with (England) Guy Wolstenholme	
11	28 Nov 1971	New Zealand Open (2)	−8 (71-66-69-70=276)	2 strokes	(England) Maurice Bembridge

=== Other New Zealand wins (10) ===
- 1950 New Zealand Open
- 1951 New Zealand Open
- 1953 New Zealand Open, New Zealand PGA Championship
- 1955 New Zealand Open, Caltex Tournament
- 1959 New Zealand Open, Caltex Tournament
- 1960 New Zealand Open
- 1961 New Zealand Open

=== British PGA Circuit wins (25) ===
No.	Date	Tournament	Winning score	Margin of victory	Runner(s)-up
1	9 Jul 1954	The Open Championship	72-71-69-71=283	1 stroke	(South Africa) Bobby Locke, (Wales) Dai Rees, (England) Syd Scott
2	2 Oct 1954	News of the World Match Play	38 holes		(Scotland) John Fallon
3	8 Jul 1955	The Open Championship	71-68-70-72=281	2 strokes	(Scotland) John Fallon
4	6 Jul 1956	The Open Championship	70-70-72-74=286	3 strokes	(Belgium) Flory Van Donck
5	21 Jun 1957	Yorkshire Evening News Tournament	65-67-64-68=264	15 strokes	(Republic of Ireland) Harry Bradshaw
6	9 May 1958	Dunlop Tournament	70-69-71-71-67=348	3 strokes	(South Africa) Harold Henning
7	14 Jun 1958	Daks Tournament	70-67-69-69=275	Tie	(South Africa) Harold Henning
8	5 Jul 1958	The Open Championship	33-72-67-73=278	Playoff	(Wales) Dave Thomas
9	11 Jun 1960	Daks Tournament	74-66-67-72=279	2 strokes	(Scotland) Tom Haliburton, (England) Jimmy Hitchcock
10	17 Jun 1960	Yorkshire Evening News Tournament	70-66-65-67=268	5 strokes	(England) Bernard Hunt
11	20 Jun 1960	Bowmaker Tournament	67-65=132	1 stroke	(England) Bernard Hunt
12	23 Jun 1961	Yorkshire Evening News Tournament	70-69-70-73=262	1 stroke	(Wales) Dai Rees
13	26 Aug 1961	Esso Golden Tournament	21 points	Tie	(Wales) Dave Thomas
14	9 Sep 1961	News of the World Match Play	3 & 1		(England) Ralph Moffitt
15	16 Sep 1961	Dunlop Masters	70-71-72-71=284	8 strokes	(Republic of Ireland) Christy O'Connor Snr
16	5 May 1962	Martini International	66-69-72-68=275	4 strokes	(Scotland) Eric Brown
17	20 May 1962	Piccadilly No. 1 Tournament	72-69-73-69=283	3 strokes	(Republic of Ireland) Christy O'Connor Snr
18	5 Jun 1965	Daks Tournament	70-71-68-66=275	4 strokes	(England) Guy Wolstenholme
19	9 Jul 1965	The Open Championship	74-68-72-71=285	2 strokes	(Wales) Brian Huggett, (Republic of Ireland) Christy O'Connor Snr
20	10 Sep 1966	News of the World Match Play	2 & 1		(England) Neil Coles
21	22 Jul 1967	Esso Golden Tournament	20 points	Tie	(Australia) Kel Nagle
22	10 Sep 1967	News of the World Match Play	4 & 3		(Wales) Dai Rees
23	8 Oct 1967	Alcan International	69-71-73-68=281	5 strokes	(England) Tony Grubb
24	14 Sep 1968	Dunlop Masters	66-69-73-66=274	5 strokes	(Wales) Dave Thomas
25	13 Jun 1970	Martini International	65-68-68-67=268	Tie	(England) Doug Sewell

=== Other European wins (3) ===
No.	Date	Tournament	Winning score	Margin of victory	Runner(s)-up
1	11 Oct 1959	Italian Open	69-67-68-65=269	1 stroke	(Italy) Alfonso Angelini
2	17 Oct 1959	Spanish Open	71-73-72-70=286	2 strokes	(France) Jean Garaïalde, (England) Syd Scott
3	24 Jul 1960	German Open	71-67-72-71=281	2 strokes	(Argentina) Roberto De Vicenzo, (France) Jean Garaïalde

=== Other wins (3) ===
- 1952 Mills Round Robin (South Africa)
- 1954 Canada Cup (with Kel Nagle)
- 1959 Canada Cup (with Kel Nagle)

=== Senior PGA Tour wins (11) ===
Legend
Senior major championships (1)
Other Senior PGA Tour (10)

No.	Date	Tournament	Winning score	Margin of victory	Runner(s)-up
1	16 Sep 1984	World Seniors Invitational	−7 (69-69-69-74=281)	1 stroke	(United States) Arnold Palmer
2	9 Dec 1984	General Foods PGA Seniors' Championship	−2 (67-73-74-72=286)	3 strokes	(United States) Don January
3	17 Mar 1985	Vintage Invitational	−7 (69-73-69-69=280)	1 stroke	(United States) Billy Casper, (United States) Arnold Palmer
4	31 Mar 1985	American Golf Carta Blanca Johnny Mathis Classic	−11 (70-64-71=205)	1 stroke	(United States) Don January
5	5 May 1985	MONY Senior Tournament of Champions	−4 (70-70-71-73=284)	3 strokes	(United States) Don January, (United States) Dan Sikes
6	9 Jun 1985	The Champions Classic	−6 (68-72-70=210)	2 strokes	(United States) Billy Casper, (United States) Jim Ferree
7	16 Jun 1985	Senior Players Reunion Pro-Am	−14 (68-66-68=202)	2 strokes	(United States) Lee Elder
8	21 Jul 1985	MONY Syracuse Senior's Classic	−9 (70-64-70=203)	2 strokes	(United States) Miller Barber, (United States) Gene Littler
9	18 Aug 1985	du Maurier Champions	−13 (64-70-69=203)	1 stroke	(United States) Ben Smith
10	15 Sep 1985	United Virginia Bank Seniors	−9 (69-69-69=207)	4 strokes	(United States) George Lanning
11	20 Oct 1985	Barnett Suntree Senior Classic	−9 (70-68-69=207)	1 stroke	(United States) Charlie Sifford

Senior PGA Tour playoff record (0–1)

No.	Year	Tournament	Opponent	Result
1	1985	Merrill Lynch/Golf Digest Commemorative Pro-Am	(United States) Lee Elder	Lost to eagle on first extra hole

=== Other senior wins (1) ===
No.	Date	Tournament	Winning score	Margin of victory	Runner-up
1	26 Jun 1988	Trusthouse Forte PGA Seniors Championship	+7 (78-67-72-70=287)	2 strokes	(South Africa) Denis Hutchinson

== Major championships ==
=== Wins (5) ===
Year	Championship	54 holes	Winning score	Margin	Runner(s)-up
1954	The Open Championship	Tied for lead	−9 (72-71-69-71=283)	1 stroke	(South Africa) Bobby Locke, (Wales) Dai Rees, (England) Syd Scott
1955	The Open Championship (2)	1 shot lead	−7 (71-68-70-72=281)	2 strokes	(Scotland) John Fallon
1956	The Open Championship (3)	3 shot lead	−2 (70-70-72-74=286)	3 strokes	(Belgium) Flory Van Donck
1958	The Open Championship (4)	2 shot lead	−6 (66-72-67-73=278)	Playoff^{1}	(Wales) Dave Thomas
1965	The Open Championship (5)	1 shot lead	−7 (74-68-72-71=285)	2 strokes	(Republic of Ireland) Christy O'Connor Snr, (Wales) Brian Huggett

^{1}Defeated Dave Thomas in 36-hole playoff; Thomson (139), Thomas (143)

=== Results timeline ===
Tournament	1951	1952	1953	1954	1955	1956	1957	1958	1959
Masters Tournament			T36	T16	T18		5	T23	DQ
U.S. Open			T26	CUT		T4	T22		
The Open Championship	T6	2	T2	1	1	1	2	1	T23

Tournament	1960	1961	1962	1963	1964	1965	1966	1967	1968	1969
Masters Tournament		T19								CUT
U.S. Open		CUT								
The Open Championship	T9	7	T6	5	T24	1	T8	T8	T24	T3

Tournament	1970	1971	1972	1973	1974	1975	1976	1977	1978	1979
Masters Tournament										
U.S. Open										
The Open Championship	T9	T9	T31	T31	CUT	CUT	CUT	T13	T24	T26

Tournament	1980	1981	1982	1983	1984
Masters Tournament					
U.S. Open					
The Open Championship					CUT

Note: Thomson never played in the PGA Championship.

Win
Top 10
Did not play

CUT = missed the halfway cut (3rd round cut in 1975 and 1984 Open Championships)
DQ = disqualified
"T" indicates a tie for a place.

=== Summary ===
Tournament	Wins	2nd	3rd	Top-5	Top-10	Top-25	Events	Cuts made
Masters Tournament	0	0	0	1	1	5	8	6
U.S. Open	0	0	0	1	1	2	5	3
The Open Championship	5	3	1	10	18	23	30	26
PGA Championship	0	0	0	0	0	0	0	0
Totals	5	3	1	12	20	30	43	35

- Most consecutive cuts made – 10 (1954 Open Championship – 1958 Open Championship)
- Longest streak of top-10s – 4 (1955 Open Championship – 1957 Masters)

== Champions Tour major championships ==
=== Wins (1) ===
Year	Championship	Winning score	Margin	Runner-up
1984^{a}	General Foods PGA Seniors' Championship	−2 (67-73-74-72=286)	3 strokes	(United States) Don January

^{a} This was the December edition of the tournament.

== Team appearances ==
Amateur

- Australian Men's Interstate Teams Matches (representing Victoria): 1948 (winners)

Professional

- World Cup (representing Australia): 1953, 1954 (winners), 1955, 1956, 1957, 1959 (winners), 1960, 1961, 1962, 1965, 1969
- Lakes International Cup (representing Australia): 1952
- Slazenger Trophy (representing British Commonwealth and Empire): 1956
- Presidents Cup (representing International): 1996 (non-playing captain), 1998 (non-playing captain, winners), 2000 (non-playing captain)
- Hopkins Trophy (representing Canada): 1952
- Vicars Shield (representing Victoria): 1951 (winners), 1952 (winners), 1953 (winners)

== See also ==
- List of golfers with most PGA Tour Champions wins
- List of golfers with most wins in one PGA Tour event
- List of men's major championships winning golfers
