= Caddie Hall of Fame =

- Description: Recognizing professional caddies and supporters of the profession
- Country: United States
- Presented by: Western Golf Association (WGA)
- Website: www.wgaesf.org/caddie-hall-of-fame

The Caddie Hall of Fame recognizes professional golf caddies, others who caddied in their youth and those who support the profession. It was originally created by the Professional Caddies Association in 1999 but has been administered by the Western Golf Association since 2011.

== Inductees ==
Inductee	Year	Inducted as	Affiliation	Awards and other induction citations
Tom Grzywinski	2024			
Peter Lynch	2023			
Richard F. Connolly, Jr.	2023			
Johnny Goodman	2023			
Tony Navarro	2023			
Ed 'Porky' Oliver	2022			
Madelyn 'Moochie' Turner	2022			
Jim Dent	2022			
Jim Nolan	2019			
Dr. Joe Schmidt	2021			
Karl Bollnow	2021			
Jimmy Johnson	2021			
Charles Schwab	2021			
Bob McMasters	2019			
Joe LaCava	2019		PGA Tour	Tiger Woods' current caddie.
Ed Batta	2018			
J. Wood Platt	2018			
Peter Ueberroth	2018			
Eddie Barr	2017	Caddie Manager	The Beverly Country Club	Founded a caddie program that has produced more than 320 Evans Scholars as caddie manager at Beverly from the mid-1940s through the mid-1980s.
Joe Barreiro	2017	Caddie Manager	Sleepy Hollow Country Club	Served as a long time caddie manager from 1972 to 2017. During that time he mentored thousands of adult and youth caddies.
Jim "Bones" Mackay	2017	Caddie	PGA Tour	Long time caddie of Phil Mickelson.
Thomas Friedman	2016	Caddie	Brookview, Rolling Green, Hazeltine	Known for his work with the New York Times and winning the Pulitzer Prize three times, he also caddied in Minnesota at Brookview, Rolling Green, and Hazeltine.
Andy Martinez	2016	Caddie	PGA Tour	Long time PGA caddie who has worked with Johnny Miller for 12 years and Tom Lehman for 23 years.
Johnny Miller	2016	Caddie	PGA Tour	A professional golfer who caddied in his youth, beginning at the age of 12, to earn his own money.
Tony Battistelo	2015	Caddie Manager	Sunset Ridge Country Club	Helped establish caddie program as the long time manager at Sunset Ridge. Mentored countless youth caddies.
Murray Brothers	2015	Caddie	Indian Hill Club	The 1980 comedy film Caddyshack was partially based on the experiences of Bill Murray and his five brothers, Andy, Brian, Ed, Joel and John. That film brought attention to the profession.
Greg Kunkel	2015	Caddie Manager	Sunset Ridge Country Club	Longtime manager at Sunset Ridge Country Club in Northfield, Illinois. Helped build club's nationally renowned caddie program and mentored thousands of caddies, many of whom went on to become Evans Scholars.
Mike Keiser	2014	Caddie/Manager	Bandon Dunes Golf Resort	Former caddie at East Aurora Country Club, WGA Director, and founder and owner of Bandon Dunes Golf Resort.
Steve Williams	2014	Caddie	PGA Tour	Caddied for Tiger Woods and Adam Scott from 1999–2014. During that time, Woods won 14 major championships and Scott won one.
George Holland	2013	Caddie/Mentor	Washington State Golf Association	Former caddie at Everett Country Club near Seattle, Washington, WGA Director and past president of the Washington State Golf Association.
Mike Kiely	2013	Caddie/Manager	Canterbury Golf Club in Cleveland, Ohio	Caddy Master and teaching member of the Professional Golfers Association for over 50 years. Member of both the Ohio and NOGA Halls of Fame.
Mayno Luetkehans	2013	Caddie/mentor	Glen Oak Country Club	Caddie manager at Glen Oak Country Club for 38 years, Mayno mentored hundreds of young people, many of whom went on to become Evans Scholars or members of the club themselves.
Jack Nicklaus	2013	Golfer	PGA Tour	Nicknamed "The Golden Bear." Won a record 18 major championships. Caddied for his father Charlie.
Tom Watson	2012	Golfer	PGA Tour	Eight-time major champion. 70 professional wins. Longtime caddie was 2003 inductee Bruce Edwards.
Dennis M. Cone	2011	Caddie/mentor	Founder/CEO of the PCA (Professional Caddies Association) Worldwide	Recipient of the "Gene Sarazen Spirit Award" Co-author of Think Like a Caddie, Play like a Pro & Mastering Golf's Toughest Shots
Jack Smith	2011	Caddie/coach	James A. Haley Veteran's Hospital in Tampa, Florida	Coached, and caddied for multiple inpatients and outpatients in rehabilitation through the VA hospital's golf program.
Laura A Cone	2010	Caddie	Co-founder of the Professional Caddies Association (PCA)	Recipient of "The Lynda Barco Award"; Trustee PCA Foundation; Contributing writer for Think Like a Caddie, Play Like a Pro.
Fred Corcoran.	2010	Caddie/mentor	World Golf Hall of Fame	Recipient of the "Gene Sarazen Spirit Award"; Mr. Golf & Golf Hall of Fame inductee; Member of golf's pioneers, helped found the LPGA, the World Cup, and the Golf Writers Association of America (GWAA); One of golf's first agents.
David Fay	2010	Caddie	Tuxedo Club in Tuxedo Park, New York	Recipient of the "Gene Sarazen Spirit Award'; Joined the Tuxedo Club at age 11 as a way to earn money; Member of the United States Golf Association (USGA).
Roger Martinez	2010	Caddie	Professional Golfers Association	Worked for Sarzen, Hogan, and most notably Jack Nicklaus both on and off the course
Sonny Meike	2010	Caddie/manager (master)	Butterfield Country Club in Oak Brook, Illinois	A master of assigning the right caddie for the job; "An incredible 'match-maker'"
Chris Sullivan	2010	Caddie/mentor	Old Memorial Golf Club in Tampa, Florida	Recipient of the "Gene Sarazen Spirit Award"; Started caddying at age 12 at a nearby country club for $4 a bag; Founded the Outback Steakhouse
Oscar Bunn	2009	Caddie	Shinnecock Hills Golf Club (SHGC) in Southampton, New York	Recipient of the "Gene Sarazen Spirit Award"; Shinnecock Indian caddie at SHGC upon its opening; First Native American to play in the U.S. Open held at SHGC in 1896
Tom Dreesen	2009	Caddie	Ravisloe Country Club in Homewood, Illinois	Recipient of the "Gene Sarazen Spirit Award"; Comedian-Golfs Global Caddie Ambassador; Learned life skills from looping; Advocate for 2011 Caddie Hall of Fame in Golf, Illinois.
George Lucas "Gorgus"	2009	Caddie	Professional Caddies Association	Creating yardage books for 32 years; Credited for his detailed bibles of champion golf courses
Joe McCourt	2009	Caddie/coach	US Blind Golfers Association (former president)	Co-winners of the 2009 Blind Golfers Association National Championship
Harvey Penick	2009	Caddie	Augusta National Golf Club in Augusta, Georgia	Recipient of the "Gene Sarazen Spirit Award"; Caddie at age 8; Master PGA Professional; Author of the Little Red Book
William J. Powell	2009	Caddie	Clearview Golf Club in East Canton, Ohio	Recipient of the "Gene Sarazen Spirit Award"; First African American to design, build, own, and operate a golf course anywhere in the world
John Shippen	2009	Caddie	Shinnecock Hills Golf Club in Southampton, New York	Recipient of the "Gene Sarazen Spirit Award"; First African American golfer to play in the U.S. Open in 1896; went on to play four more U.S. Opens: 1899, 1900, 1902, and 1913
Jim Tanner "JT"	2009	Caddie/manager (over 50 years)	Pawtucket Country Club in Pawtucket, Rhode Island	Mentored hundreds of young people—many becoming members of the club themselves
Jim Warters and Jackie Warters	2009	Caddie/mentor	Professional Caddies Association	Recipient of "The Lynda Barco Spirit Award; Golf writer and member of the Golf Writers Association of America (GWAA)
Elijah Brown	2008	Caddie	Seminole Golf Club in Juno Beach, Florida	"Brown's character and commitment to golf is a model for all"
James V. Burgess, Jr.	2008	Caddie/mentor	Professional Caddies Association	Recipient of the "Gene Sarazen Spirit Award"; Mentor, lawyer, former Mayor; Served as mediator for the 10th Judicial District Alternative Dispute Resolution Program
Charlie DeLucca	2008	Caddie	Dade Amateur Golf Association	Recipient of the "Arthur 'Bucky' Walters Award"; "The Godfather of South Florida Golf"
Carl Eisenbrei "Uncle Carl"	2008	Caddie (59 years)	Congress Lake Club in Hartville, Ohio	"Carl is a true gentleman and bible scholar"
Max Elbin	2008	Caddie/mentor	Burning Tree Club in Bethesda, Maryland	Recipient of the "Gene Sarazen Spirit Award"; Professional Golfers Association (president from 1966-1968)
Tom Gorman	2008	Caddie/manager (47 years)	Beverly Country Club in Chicago, Illinois	Work as a caddie/manager influencing teenagers for 47 years at Beverly Country Club
Percy Hall and Jackie Hall	2008	Caddie/coach	Professional Caddies Association	Recipient of the "Arthur 'Bucky' Walters Award"; Their advice as parents to deaf golfer Kevin Hall, PGA Tour card holder: "Get out there, get the experience, do what people do, Win!"
Jack Lucas	2008	Caddie	Professional Caddies Association	Recipient of "The Lynda Barco Spirit Award"; "Lessons he learned on the golf course continue to apply"
John Reynolds	2008	Caddie/mentor	Professional Caddies Association	Recipient of the "Gene Sarazen Spirit Award"; Vice President, Club Car, Global Business Development
William Thomas "Bill"	2008	Caddie (69 years)	Wee Burn Golf Club in Darien, Connecticut	"To members and the profession he is truly a diamond in the ruff. His dedication to Wee Burn is unfaltering"
Arthur Bucky Walters	2008	Caddie	The First Tee	Father and caddie for Dennis Walters; Expert shot maker; A true professional
Lance Barrow	2007	Caddie (retired)	CBS Sports	Recipient of the "Gene Sarazen Spirit Award"; Supported caddies and the game by bringing excellence in broadcasting of the game, around the world
Rick Schad	2007	Caddie	Professional Caddies Association	Recipient of "The Lynda Barco Spirit Award; Known for his creative graphic art; True to the game and to helping kids learn through the game of golf
Frank Selva	2007	Caddie/manager	Race Brook Country Club in Orange, Connecticut	Started as a Caddie to become a caddie/manager and coach for the Special Olympics
Michael Cohen	2006	Caddie	Professional Caddies Association (PCA)	Recipient of "The Lynda Barco Spirit Award"; Supporter of the PCA
Douglass Ellsworth	2006	Caddie/coach	Sankaty Head Caddy Camp in Siasconset, Massachusetts	Director at the Sankaty Head Caddy Camp, on Nantucket Island—the last remaining caddie camp in the United States
Michael Hartman "Mike"	2006	Caddie	Professional Caddies Association (PCA)	Recipient of "The Lynda Barco Spirit Award"; Diligently assisted the PCA for more than 15 years
Bradley S. Klein	2006	Caddie	Professional Golfers Association	Industry leader Klein was the architecture editor for Golfweek and founding editor of SuperNews!
Gerry W. Barousse, Jr.	2006	Caddie/coach (21 years)	US Blind Golfers Association	Recipient of the "Arthur 'Bucky' Walters Award"; Caddie coach for blind Golfer and US Blind Golfers Association National Champion, Pat W. Browne
Walter Pritchett "Cricket"	2006	Caddie	Augusta National Golf Club in Augusta, Georgia	PGA Tour Club caddie with 4 wins; Fondest experience happened in 1971 when he won the Masters with Charles Coody
Willie Stokes "Pappy"	2006	Caddie	Augusta National Golf Club in Augusta, Georgia	"The Grandfather of Caddies" at Augusta National Golf Club; Only caddie to have worked with 4 different Masters Champions with 5 combined wins in, 1938, 1948, 1951, 1953, and 1956
Kevin J. Sullivan	2006	Caddie (14 years)	US Blind Golfers Association	Recipient of the "Arthur 'Bucky' Walters Award"; Worked 14 years with Bill McMahon, a player in the Blind Golfers Association
Van Costa	2005	Caddie	Professional Golfers Association	Caddie for the PGA Tour & the LPGA Tour; Successful business man and author
Oscar Goings	2005	Caddie/manager (50 years)	Winchester Golf Club in Winchester, Massachusetts	Recipient of the "Caddie/Manager Award"; Caddie/manager at the Winchester Golf Club
Tom Morris "Old Tom Morris"	2005	Caddie	Professional Caddies Association	Recipient of the "Gene Sarazen Spirit Award"; Open champion 1861, 1862, 1864, and 1867
Willie Park	2005	Caddie	Professional Caddies Association	Recipient of the "Gene Sarazen Spirit Award"; Won the first Open; Went on to win in 1863, 1866, and 1875
Gene Sarazen	2005	Caddie	World Golf Hall of Fame Inductee	Eight-time major champion; Started career as a caddie; "owed much to the game of golf"
William J Survilla	2005	Caddie/manager (30 years)	Oak Park Country Club in River Grove, Illinois	Mentored 10,000 kids during his tenure at the club
Bruce Edwards	2004	Caddie	Professional Golfers Association	Caddie for the PGA Tour and the Senior PGA Tour; Long time caddie for Tom Watson
Terry McNamara	2004	Caddie	Ladies Professional Golf Association	Long time caddie for Annika Sorenstam
Fanny Sunesson	2004	Caddie	Professional Golfers Association	Long time caddie for Nick Faldo
Don Bobillo	2003	Caddie/manager	American Golf Association	Volunteer caddie/manager at the Phoenix Open; Named 1994 "Volunteer of the Year" by the American Golf Association
Andrew Butley "The Rooney"	2003	Caddie	Tramore Golf Club Tramore, Ireland	Caddie and teacher at Tremore Golf Club
Leonard Ciccone "Lenny"	2003	Caddie (65 years)	Montclair Country Club in West Orange, New Jersey	Caddie for Yogi Berra in 1988
Andrew Dickson	2003	Caddie	Professional Caddies Association	The first named caddie (1681); Club maker in Edinburgh, Scotland
Carl S. Laib	2003	Caddie	Ladies Professional Golf Association	Caddie for Patty Sheehan; Has 28 wins, including 7 majors; College golf coach
Saverio Macaluso "Mac"	2003	Caddie	Oakmont Country Club in Oakmont, Pennsylvania	2nd oldest living caddie—started caddying at the club when he was 8-years-old
Pete McCann	2003	Caddie (45 years)	Alpine Country Club in Demarest, New Jersey	Recently retired after 45 years of caddie service
Willie McRae	2003	Caddie	Pinehurst Country Club in Pinehurst, North Carolina	Worked on tours for both the PGA and the LPGA
James Pernice	2003	Caddie	Oakmont Country Club in Oakmont, Pennsylvania	Worked 7 U.S. Opens; Caddie for Sam Snead and Bobby Jones
Charlie Winton	2003	Caddie	Gleneagles Golf Club in Perthshire, Scotland	Caddies and teaches youngsters ages 12–16.
Jerry Woodard "Woody"	2003	Caddie (30 years)	Ladies Professional Golf Association	20 wins, including 6 Majors.
Gary Chapman	2002	Caddie	Professional Caddies Association	Recipient of "The Lynda Barco Spirit Award"; Award-winning country singer and PCA contributor.
Jerry Darden "Dee"	2002	Caddie	Ladies Professional Golf Association	LPGA caddie; photographer and author of Inside the Ropes.
Pedro Eulalio	2002	Caddie	Tijuana Country Club in Tijuana, Mexico	Caddied for thousands of players during a career that spanned several decades.
Mike Granuzzo	2002	Caddie	Professional Caddies Association	Recipient of "The Lynda Barco Award"; Founder & CEO of Caddie Master Enterprises.
Scott Houston	2002	Caddie	Professional Golfers Association	Named 2001 "Golf Nut of the Year"; Caddie for Arnold Palmer at Pebble Beach in 2001.
Sam Johnson	2002	Caddie (50 Years)	Professional Golfers Association	Philadelphia PGA section with 50 years of service.
John O'Reilly "Irish"	2002	Caddie	Professional Golfers Association	European Tour and PGA Tour; co-authored Life of Reilly.
Martin Roy	2002	Caddie/manager	Carnoustie Golf Links in Angus, Scotland	Caddie/manager at Carnoustie Golf Links
Patrick J. Collins "Pat"	2001	Caddie/manager (30 years)	Winged Foot Golf Club in Mamaroneck, New York	Caddie at Winged Foot Golf Club for 30 years.
Willie Aitchison	2000	Caddie/manager	Professional Caddies Association	European caddie/manager, British Open; caddie for Lee Trevino.
James Anderson "Tip"	2000	Caddie	St Andrews Golf Course in Fife, Scotland	Caddie for Arnold Palmer at The Open.
Freddie Bennett	2000	Caddie (master) (40 years)	Augusta National Gulf Club in Augusta, Georgia	Retired caddie from the Augusta National Gulf Club.
Steve Burks	2000	Caddie	Marriott Vacation Club International	Recipient of 'The Lynda Barco Spirit Award".
Ernest Carolon "Creamy"	2000	Caddie	Professional Caddies Association	Retired caddie; Long time caddie for Arnold Palmer; Tour Yardage founder.
Jim Clark	2000	Caddie	Baltusrol Golf Club in Springfield Township, New Jersey	The oldest working caddie to date caddied at Baltusrol Golf Club at 101 years of age.
Alfred Dyer "Rabbit"	2000	Caddie	Professional Caddies Association	Caddie for the PGA Tour and the Senior PGA Tour; long time caddie for Gary Player.
Sam Foy "Killer"	2000	Caddie	Professional Caddies Association	Caddie for the PGA Tour and the Senior PGA Tour; Long time caddie for Hale Irwin
Roscoe Jones	2000	Caddie	Ladies Professional Golf Association	Caddie for the LPGA Tour; Long time caddie for Nancy Lopez
Lorne LeBere "Rabbit"	2000	Caddie (30 years)	Professional Caddies Association	Caddie for the PGA Tour and the Senior PGA Tour
Lee Lynch	2000	Caddie	Professional Caddies Association	Caddie for the PGA Tour; Caddied for Al Geiberger during record shattering round of "59"
Willie Peterson	2000	Caddie	Augusta National Golf Club in Augusta, Georgia	Long time Jack Nicklaus Masters caddie
Greg Rita	2000	Caddie	Professional Caddies Association	Caddie for the PGA Tour and the Senior PGA Tour; Caddie at The Open Championship with John Daly; Multiple wins with multiple Pro's
Ross Young "Cotton"	2000	Caddie (65 years)	Saucon Valley Country Club in Bethlehem, Pennsylvania	Caddie at Saucon Valley Country Club for over 65 years
Angelo Argea	1999	Caddie	Professional Caddies Association	Caddie PGA Tour; Long time caddie for Jack Nicklaus with multiple wins during their years together
Ralph Coffey	1999	Caddie	Professional Caddies Association	Caddie for the PGA Tour and the Senior PGA Tour; Caddie for Deane Beman and George Burns; 12 combined wins with one being a major
Peter Coleman	1999	Caddie	Professional Caddies Association	Caddie on the PGA Tour and European Tour; Long time caddie for Bernhard Langer
Mike Cowan "Fluff"	1999	Caddie	Professional Caddies Association	Caddie for the PGA Tour; Caddied for Peter Jacobson, Tiger Woods, and Jim Furyk
Charles Evans, Jr. "Chick"	1999	Caddie	Western Golf Association	His namesake "Evans Scholars Foundation" administered by the Western Golf Association awards over $20 million in caddie scholarships a year
Alfie Fyles	1999	Caddie	Royal Birkdale Golf Club Southport, England	Caddie at Royal Birkdale Golf Club, British Open caddie for 5-time champion Tom Watson
Adolphos Hull "Golf Ball"	1999	Caddie	Professional Caddies Association	Caddie for the PGA Tour; Caddied for Raymond Floyd, Lee Elder, and Calvin Peete
Carl Jackson	1999	Caddie	Augusta National Golf Club in Augusta Georgia	Caddie at the Augusta National Golf Club and for the PGA Tour; 2 Masters wins with Ben Crenshaw
Eddie Lowery	1999	Caddie	Professional Caddies Association	Caddie for Francis Ouimet in 1913 U.S. Open; Symbolic icon of "The Caddie".
Jeff Medlin "Squeaky"	1999	Caddie	Professional Caddies Association	Caddie for the PGA Tour and both Nick Price and John Daly's PGA Win.
Herman Mitchell	1999	Caddie	Professional Caddies Association	Caddie for the PGA Tour and the Senior PGA Tour; long time caddie for Lee Trevino.
Francis Ouimet	1999	Caddie	Professional Golfers Association	Caddie & golf champion at the 1913 U.S. Open—coined "The Greatest Game Ever Played"; Founder of the Ouimet Scholarship Fund—awarded $1 million in caddie scholarships.
Henry Rice "Gado"	1999	Caddie (48 years)	Professional Caddies Association	Caddie for the PGA Tour winning back to back with George Knudson in 1968.
Emil Smith "Smitty"	1999	Caddie (30 years)	Professional Caddies Association	Caddie for the PGA Tour and the Senior PGA Tour; Caddied for Bob Charles and Ben Crenshaw.
Donnie Wanstall "Wad"	1999	Caddie	Professional Caddies Association	Caddie for the PGA Tour; Caddie for Mark O'Meara and Curtis Strange with a combined 14 wins.
