= Angelo Argea =

Greek American caddie (1929–2005)

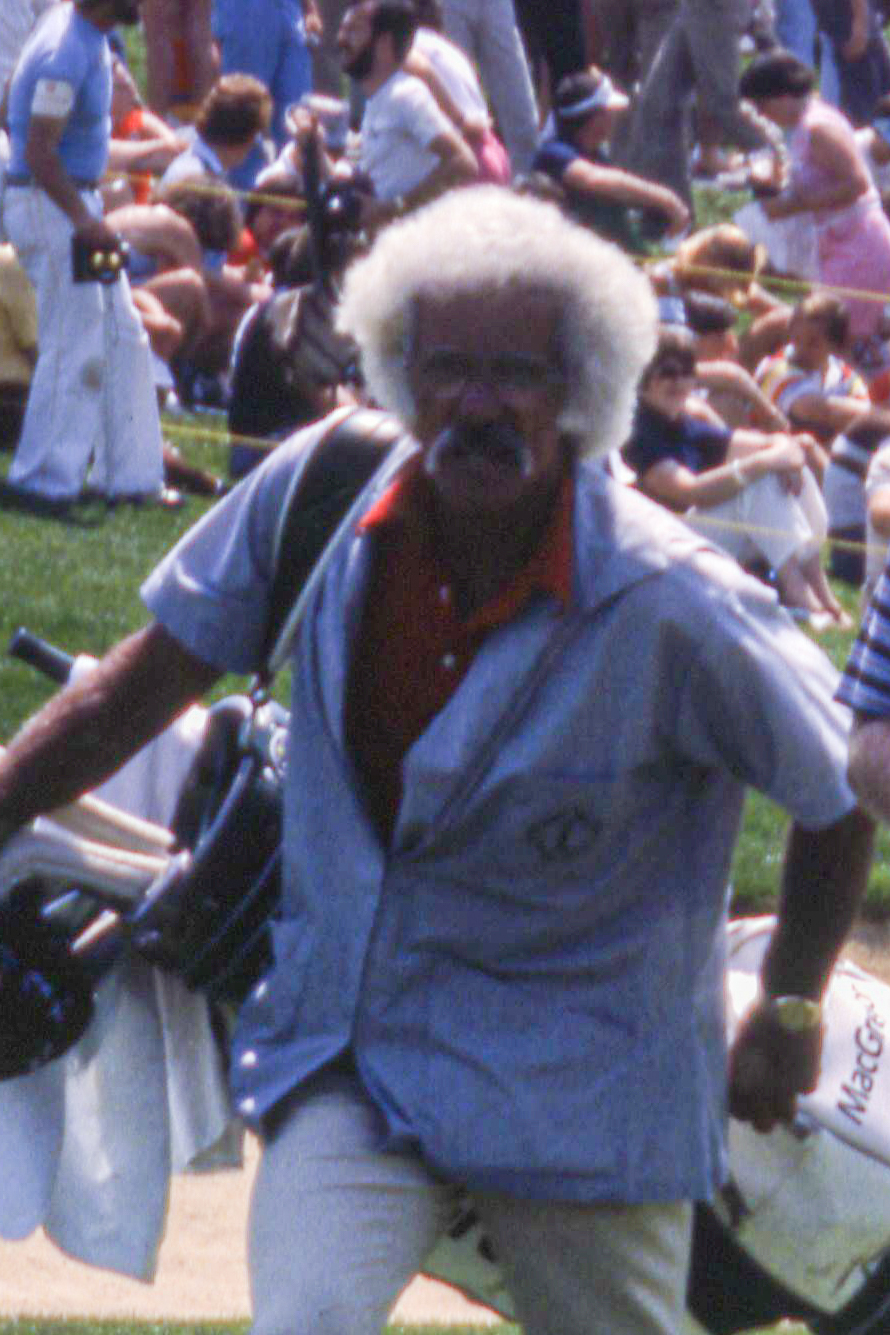
- Argea during the 1980 Memorial Tournament
- Born: November 7, 1929; Greece
- Died: October 10, 2005 (aged 75); Canton, Ohio, U.S.
- Occupation: caddie

Angelo Argea (November 7, 1929 – October 10, 2005) was best known as the caddie for Jack Nicklaus.

Argea was born in Greece. He and Nicklaus first met at the Palm Springs Golf Classic in 1963, when Argea signed up to caddie for him. Argea continued to caddie for Nicklaus for over 20 years. During this time, he was on the bag for 44 of Nicklaus' 70 PGA Tour wins (that tally would later be revised to 73 when Open Championship wins were added to PGA Tour win records). Argea was easily recognizable by his gray afro. Of Argea, Nicklaus has remarked, "Essentially, he has been retired since he was twenty-one."

At the majors, players could not use their own caddies until the mid-1970s; the Masters held out until 1983. Argea's first major win with Nicklaus was the PGA Championship in 1975.

A golfer once noticed that Argea didn't read greens, step off the yardage or select clubs, so he asked Argea, "What exactly do you do for Jack?" Argea replied, "He asked me to do two things. When he's not playing well, one, remind him that he's the best golfer out there. And two, that there's plenty of holes left."

"Angelo was known for his ... gray afro, but he should also be known for being an excellent caddie," Nicklaus said.

He was inducted into the PCA Worldwide Caddie Hall of Fame in 1999. In 2005, Argea died of liver cancer at the age of 75 in Canton, Ohio.

== See also ==
- Caddie Hall of Fame
