= Clyde Park Challenge Cup =

Golf tournament award for top female golfer

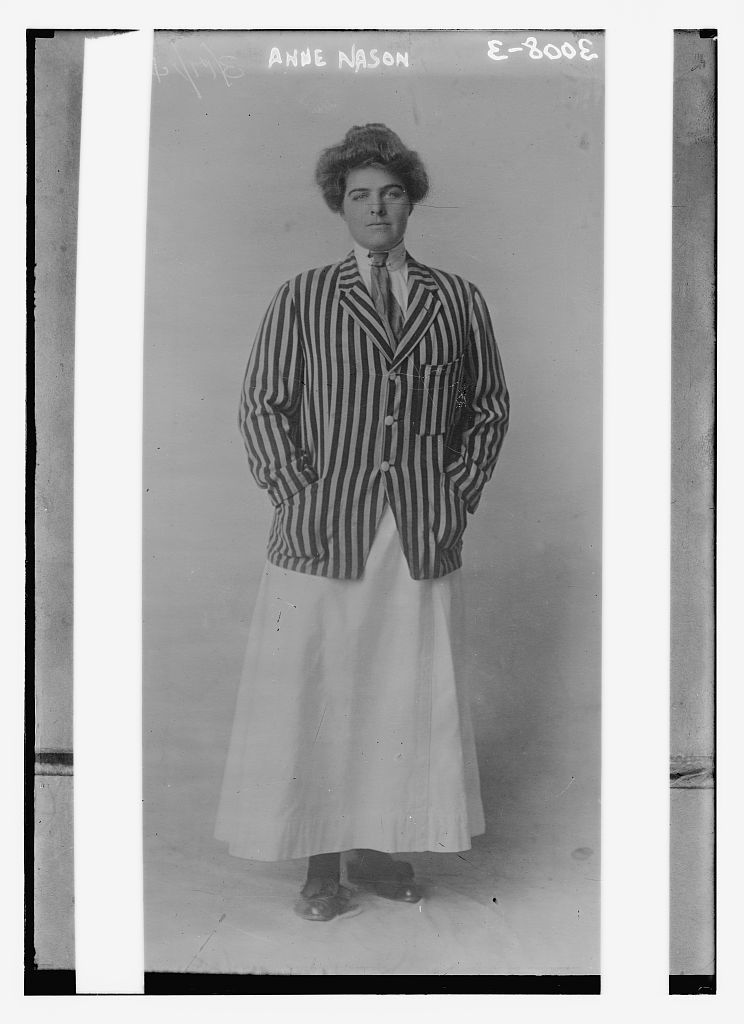

The Clyde Park Challenge Cup is played at the Brookline Country Club and it is awarded to the best female golfer of that year.

== Winners ==
- 1899 Louise A. Wells
- 1900 Nellie C. Sargent
- 1901 Tiara Fay
- 1904
- 1909 Pauline Firth
- 1913 Anne Nason
