= Eddie Lowery =

American caddie, golfer and businessman (1902–1984)

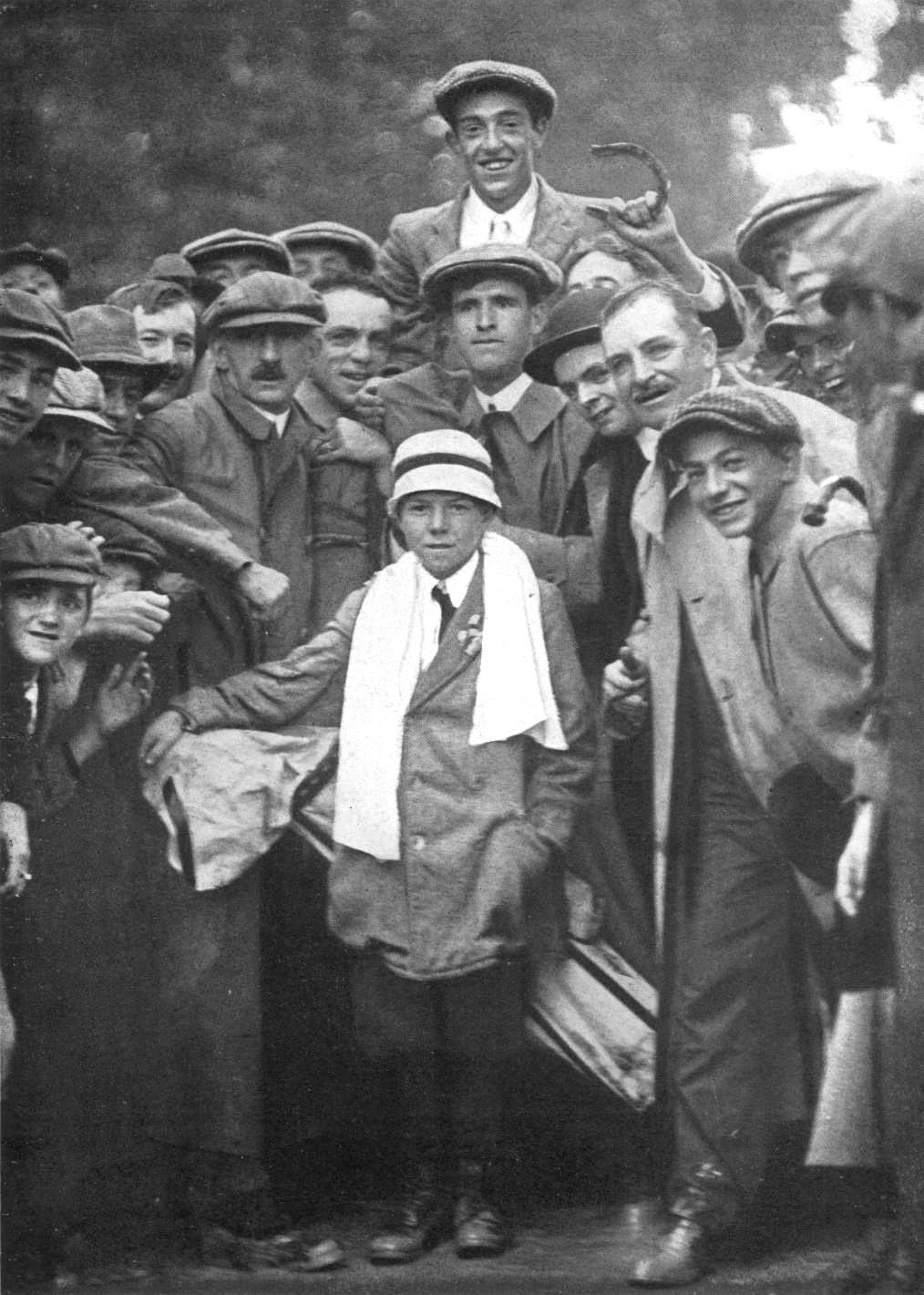
Eddie Lowery with the white towel in front of the crowd carrying for Francis Ouimet in 1913.

Edward Edgar Lowery (October 14, 1902 – May 4, 1984) was an American caddie, amateur golfer, and multi-millionaire businessman.

== Early life ==
Lowery was the fifth child born to John and Maria Lowery (née Curran), who were Irish immigrants who lived in Newton, Massachusetts.

Lowery is best known as the 10-year-old caddie of Francis Ouimet during the 1913 U.S. Open, held at The Country Club in Brookline, Massachusetts, which Ouimet won in a playoff over Harry Vardon and Ted Ray. An iconic photograph of Lowery and Ouimet striding down the fairway together is one of the most memorable in American golf history. It was used as the logo for the United States Golf Association's centennial celebrations, appears on the cover of Mark Frost's account of the 1913 Open The Greatest Game Ever Played: Harry Vardon, Francis Ouimet, and the Birth of Modern Golf and inspired a memorial statue in Brookline. Lowery was prominently featured in the 2005 Disney movie The Greatest Game Ever Played, portrayed by actor Josh Flitter.

== Career ==
He moved to San Francisco, California, and championed the rising amateur careers of Ken Venturi (1964 U.S. Open Champion), Harvie Ward (1955 & 1956 U.S. Amateur Champion), and Tony Lema (1964 British Open Champion), among others. Lowery played at San Francisco Golf Club in San Francisco.

He became a multi-millionaire as an auto dealer in San Francisco. Lowery and Bob Hope were friends and they both played in the 1951 British Amateur. He enjoyed sponsoring young amateur golfers, such as two of his employees: Venturi and Ward. In 1956 he arranged a match between these two amateurs and two golf pros, Ben Hogan and Byron Nelson, a friendly four-ball match at Cypress Point Club. The amateurs played a strong game but the pros took the match, 1-up. Venturi told a newspaper years later, "It was the best golf I've ever seen." This match was chronicled in depth in Mark Frost's 2007 book The Match.

Lowery also served on the executive committee of the United States Golf Association. His sponsorship of Harvie Ward led to problems, because Lowery had claimed certain disallowable business expenses for tax write-offs. And Ward, who had trusted Lowery's USGA expertise, had his amateur status revoked in 1957, at a time when he had won the previous two consecutive U.S. Amateur titles.

== Personal life ==
Lowery and Ouimet were lifelong friends, and when Ouimet died in 1967, Lowery was one of the pallbearers.

In 1984, Lowery died in Riverside County, California. He is buried at El Carmelo cemetery in Pacific Grove, California.

== See also ==
- Caddie Hall of Fame
