= Max Elbin =

Professional golfer, golf administrator (1920-2008)

Carl Maxwell Elbin (May 20, 1920 – December 12, 2008) was an American golf professional who served a three-year term as president of the Professional Golfers' Association of America during a time when professional tournament golfers split away to form the PGA Tour.

== Biography ==
Elbin started out as a caddie at the Cumberland Country Club in Cumberland, Maryland, where he developed his golfing skills and won the club's Caddie Championship as a teenager. While at the practice green preparing to compete in the 1939 Bedford Springs Open at the Bedford Springs Hotel, he met Lew Worsham, the pro at the Burning Tree Club in Bethesda, Maryland. Worsham hired Elbin in 1940 as his assistant at Burning Tree for $19 per week. During the winter, Elbin worked at the Indian Creek Club in Miami Beach, Florida for $25 per week.

During World War II, Elbin joined the United States Army Air Corps in 1942, serving as crew chief on a B-29 Superfortress that saw action over New Guinea, the Philippines and Tokyo.

After the war, both Elbin and Worsham returned to Burning Tree. Worsham left the club for a career as a professional golfer, ultimately winning the 1947 U.S. Open over Sam Snead. Elbin took Worsham's position as pro at age 26 after making a deal over a handshake. As the pro at Burning Tree, he played with six U.S. Presidents: Dwight D. Eisenhower, John F. Kennedy, Lyndon B. Johnson, Richard Nixon, Gerald Ford and George H. W. Bush.

In 1965, Elbin was selected to serve a three-year term as the 15th president of the Professional Golfers' Association of America. At the time, the touring professional golfers felt that their concerns were not being met. Jack Nicklaus and Arnold Palmer led the movement to create a separate organization that became known as the PGA Tour. The operating agreement signed between the PGA of America and the professional golfers divided the various events, with the PGA Tour taking the World Series of Golf and the PGA of America taking control of the Ryder Cup, then a sparsely attended competition that became one golf's most popular events by the time of Elbin's death.

== Personal life ==
Elbin died at age 88 at his home in Bethesda, Maryland due to heart failure. He was survived by his wife, Mary, and five children. His youngest son, Willam "Kelly" Elbin, was the Director of Communications and Publications for the PGA of America.
