= Fanny Sunesson =

Professional golf caddie

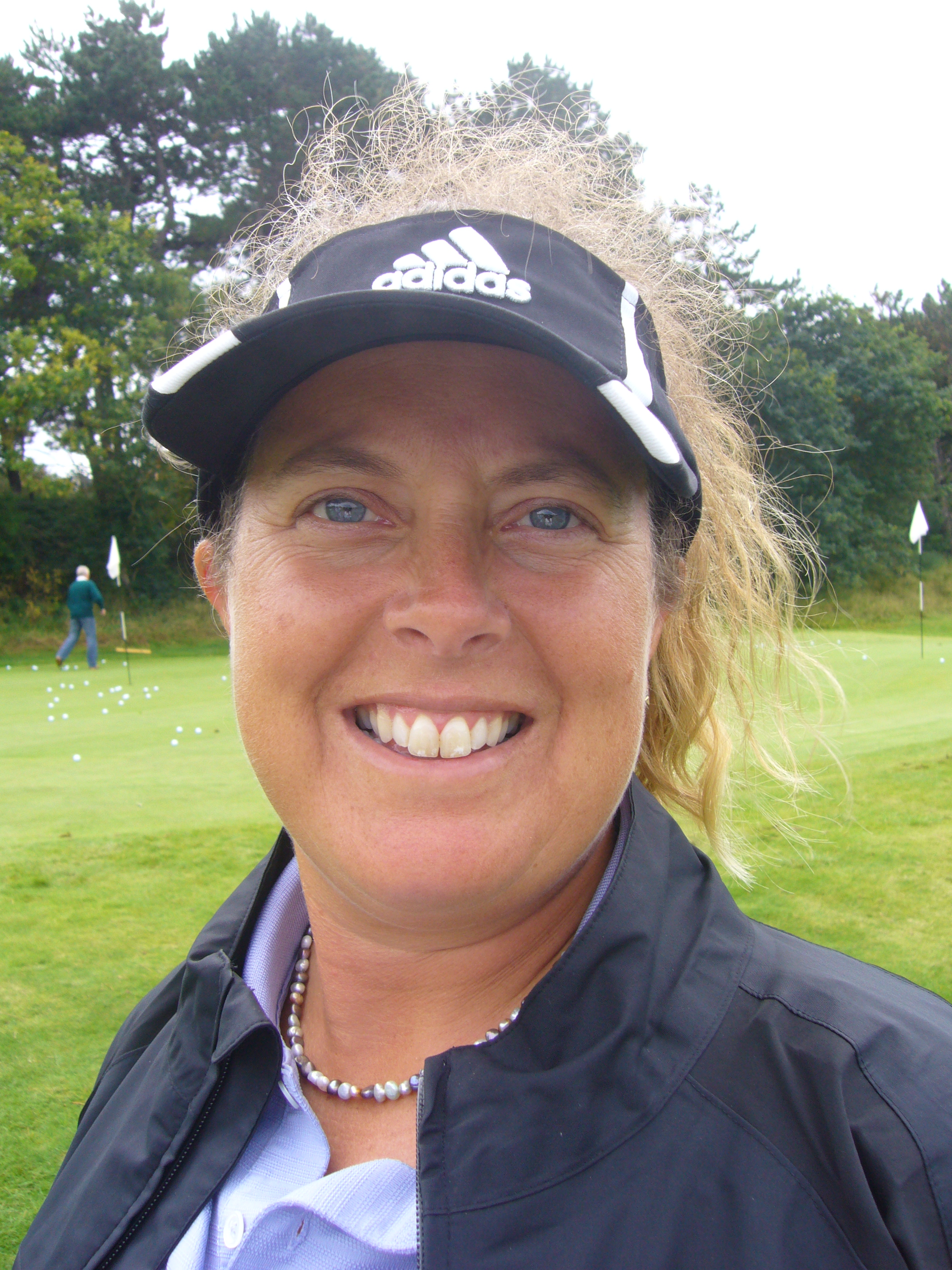
Sunesson in 2006

Fanny Sunesson (born 9 July 1967) is a professional golf caddie, made notable for being the caddy of Nick Faldo from 1990 to 1999. She is the first female caddie to win a men's major golf championship.

== Career ==
Sunesson was born in Gothenburg, Sweden, into a golfing family. At age 15, she played golf at amateur standard. In 1986, Sunesson and her mother Stina won the Swedish Mother and Daughter Championship, played as 36-hole foursome stroke-play. The same year she decided to get an insight on the tour. At the European Tour tournament Scandinavian Enterprise Open in Stockholm in July, she tried to be a volunteer caddie and was asked to stand in a line with all other candidates. When all male volunteer caddies finally had been chosen by the tournament professionals, three teen-age girls were left without a bag yet. The names of the three girls were Sunesson, Annika Sörenstam and Charlotta Sörenstam. Finally by persuading tour player Jaime Gonzalez, Brazil, he let her caddie for him.

She soon began caddying for Howard Clark during the 1980s before Nick Faldo asked her to join up with him at the end of 1989.

Faldo, who had recently undergone major swing surgery with coach David Leadbetter, won four majors together with Sunesson over a nine-year period. Sunesson decided to part from Faldo in 1999 to caddie for Sergio García in what was a short-lived stint of just eight tournaments before being sacked after a run of poor form culminated in García missing the cut in The Players Championship.

Sunesson then had stints with Fred Funk and Notah Begay III before being rehired by Nick Faldo.

It was a coincidence that Sunesson and Faldo both married their respective partners on the same date in July 2001. Her husband is Eric Rogers.

Sunesson retired in 2012 to coach and advise full-time. She served as a mental coach for Martin Kaymer.

In 2018, Sunesson came out of retirement to serve as Australian golfer Adam Scott's caddie for The Open Championship at Carnoustie and she caddied for fellow Swede Henrik Stenson at the 2019 Masters Tournament and the Open Championship in 2026.

== See also ==
- Caddie Hall of Fame
