= License to Wed =

2007 film directed by Ken Kwapis

- Theatrical release poster
- Directed by: Ken Kwapis
- Screenplay by: Kim Barker; Tim Rasmussen; Vince Di Meglio
- Story by: Kim Barker; Wayne Lloyd
- Produced by: Mike Medavoy; Robert Simonds; Arnold W. Messer; Nick Osborne
- Starring: Robin Williams; Mandy Moore; John Krasinski; Christine Taylor; Eric Christian Olsen; Josh Flitter
- Cinematography: John Bailey
- Edited by: Kathryn Himoff
- Music by: Christophe Beck
- Production companies: Village Roadshow Pictures; Phoenix Pictures; Robert Simonds Productions; Underground Films and Management; Proposal Productions
- Distributed by: Warner Bros. Pictures
- Release date: July 3, 2007
- Running time: 91 minutes
- Country: United States
- Language: English
- Budget: $35 million
- Box office: $70 million

License to Wed is a 2007 American romantic comedy film directed by Ken Kwapis, and starring Robin Williams, Mandy Moore and John Krasinski, with Christine Taylor, Eric Christian Olsen and Josh Flitter in supporting roles. The plot tells the story of a clergyman who puts an engaged couple through a grueling marriage preparation course to see if they are meant to be married in his church.

License to Wed was released in the United States on July 3, 2007, by Warner Bros. Pictures. It received negative reviews from critics and grossed $70 million on a $35 million budget.

== Plot ==
Sadie Jones longs to marry her lifetime companion Ben Murphy in her family church. Although her lifelong dream has been to do so in her childhood church, St. Augustine's the next available wedding slot is two years away. This is unless they take advantage of a cancellation, meaning the wedding must be held in three weeks.

The church's eccentric minister, Reverend Frank Littleton, will only wed the couple if they agree to pass his prenuptial course (shortened, due to the wedding date, from three months to three weeks). As the big day draws near, Sadie and Ben must now follow all of Reverend Frank's rules, attend his unusual classes, and complete a series of homework assignments These are designed specifically to test their relationship, to confirm that theirs is not puppy love and to ensure the union will have a sound foundation.

In one part of the course, the couple must care for twin robot babies to simulate parenting. Due to a technical issue, they get on Ben's nerves so he damages one, to the horror of bystanders in a department store. To Ben's dismay, one of Frank's rules is no premarital sex. To ensure compliance, Frank has a bug planted in the couple's bedroom, so he can listen to all conversations. Ben eventually discovers the transmitter but does not tell Sadie, fearing she would not believe him.

Problems gradually begin to develop between the couple. Ben begins an investigation into Frank and eventually discovers that he was once married to a woman named Maria Gonzalez. Shortly before the wedding, Sadie starts to have doubts, in part due to Ben not preparing his marriage vows as required. Instead, he creates a cartoon flip book of a truck.

Ben confronts Frank about Maria Gonzalez, believing him to be a hypocrite. However, he reveals that the marriage was done to allow Maria, an immigrant and member of Frank's congregation, to stay in the U.S. Upset that Ben has wasted his time on this investigation rather than write his vows, Sadie calls off the wedding, leaving Ben devastated. On Frank's advice, Sadie goes on vacation with her whole family to Jamaica, the couple's intended honeymoon destination.

Ben seeks advice from his friend Joel, who advises him to give up on Sadie, as there are other "fish in the sea". He, however, disagrees with this so decides to go to Jamaica. Frank and his assistant also travel there shortly after.

Ben attempts to call Sadie, but she refuses to listen. Her parents assure her that all marriages have problems, and even her friend Carlisle tells her that Ben may just want someone who relies on him, allowing her to forgive Ben more easily. Ben writes his vows on the sand of the beach, they reconcile, and Frank weds them there.

== Cast ==
- Robin Williams as Reverend Frank Littleton
- Mandy Moore as Sadie Jones-Murphy
- John Krasinski as Ben Murphy
- Eric Christian Olsen as Carlisle Myers
- Christine Taylor as Lindsey Jones
- DeRay Davis as Joel Howard
- Josh Flitter as Cameron the Choir Boy
- Peter Strauss as Mr. Jones
- Roxanne Hart as Mrs. Jones
- Grace Zabriskie as Grandma Jones
- Mindy Kaling as Shelly Rawat
- Angela Kinsey as Judith the Jewelry Clerk
- Rachael Harris as Janine Petroski
- Brian Baumgartner as Jim Boyce
- Wanda Sykes as Nurse Borman

== Production ==
In February 2005, it was announced that Warner Bros. had acquired the Kim Barker-penned spec script. In March 2006, it was announced that Robin Williams, Mandy Moore and John Krasinski had been secured for the lead roles.

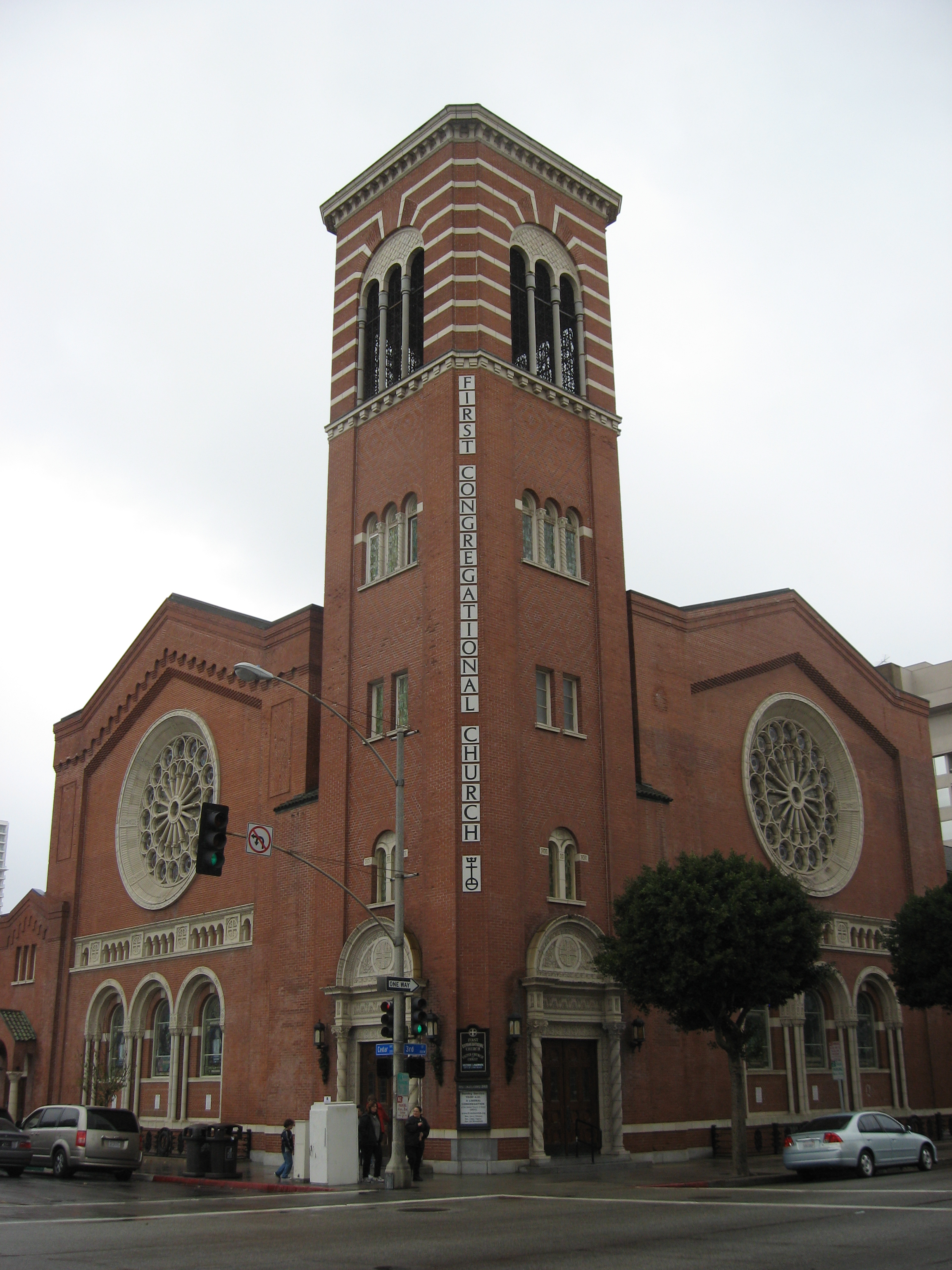

Filming partially took place at First Congregational Church in Long Beach, California, as well as other locations in the region. Ken Kwapis frequently directed episodes of the U.S. television show The Office. This resulted in appearances from The Office cast members John Krasinski, Angela Kinsey, Mindy Kaling and Brian Baumgartner. Filming began on May 16, 2006.

== Release ==
=== Critical reception ===
On Rotten Tomatoes, the film has a rating of 7% based on 123 reviews, with an average rating of 3.3/10. The consensus reads: "Featuring one of Robin Williams's most shtick-heavy performances, the broad and formulaic License to Wed wrings little out of its slightly creepy, unappealing premise." On Metacritic, it has a score of 25 out of 100, based on 30 reviews, indicating "generally unfavorable" reviews. Audiences surveyed by CinemaScore gave the film a grade of "B+" on scale of A+ to F.

Variety reviewed the film as "an astonishingly flat romantic comedy, filled with perplexing choices".

Numerous reviewers, including Brian Lowry of Variety and MaryAnn Johanson of Flick Filosopher described Williams's character as "creepy" and more worthy of a horror-film villain than a comic lead.

=== Box office ===
The film grossed $10,422,258 in its opening weekend, opening at #4 at the US box office, behind Live Free or Die Hard, Ratatouille and Transformers, the latter of which opened at the top spot. As of November 11, 2007, License to Wed had grossed $43.8 million domestically, and $70.2 million worldwide, both career highs for Mandy Moore as a lead actress, and a box-office success after a $35 million reported budget.
