= Anne Nason =

American golfer

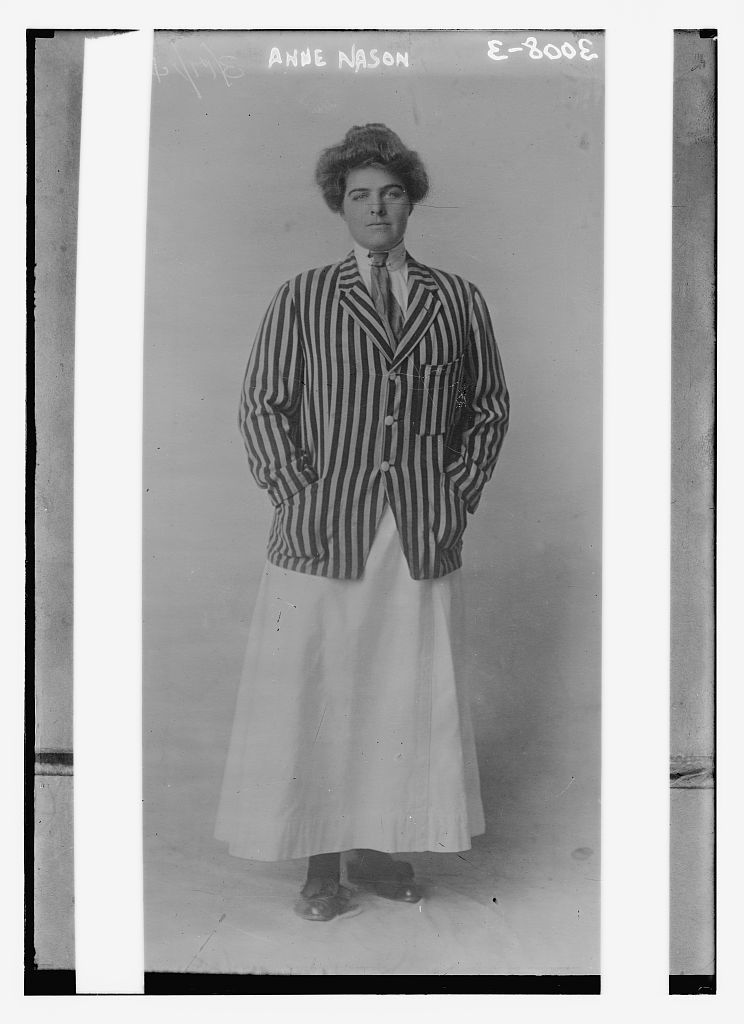

Anne Nason was an American championship golf player for The Country Club in Brookline, Massachusetts. She was a winner of the Clyde Park Challenge Cup in 1913.
