= Bradley S. Klein =

American political scientist (born 1954)

Bradley S. Klein (born 1954) is an American author, senior writer for Golf Channel/GolfAdvisor.com and design consultant on golf course architecture. As an author, he has been collected by libraries worldwide.

== Career ==
=== Caddie ===
Klein caddied as a young man and earned the Long Island Caddie Scholarship in 1971. He attended college and earned a B.A. and eventually a Ph.D. in Political Science. He spent his summers from 1976–1986 as a caddie on the PGA Tour. In 2006, Klein was inducted into the Caddie Hall of Fame, which is administered by the Western Golf Association.

=== Author ===
Klein is the author of seven golf architecture books, including Rough Meditations (1997), Discovering Donald Ross (2001), and Wide Open Fairways (2013).

He won the USGA International Book Award for his work on Discovering Donald Ross. The book went into detail on Donald Ross and included old drawings, maps and photographs of Ross' most famous courses. Brian McCallen of Golf Magazine called Discovering Donald Ross, “…the most thoroughly researched book ever produced on the life and work of a golf course architect.”

Klein earned the 2015 Donald Ross Award for distinguished lifetime achievement from the American Society of Golf Course Architects. The award is presented to an individual who has made a positive contribution to golf and golf course architecture. ASGCA President Lee Schmidt said: "Brad has traveled the world studying and reporting on golf course architecture. His articles and books have informed golfers and non-golfers alike, telling the story of courses and those who design them.”

=== Design Consultant ===
Klein has been a design consultant on dozens of golf course projects, primarily restorations. Among his consultancies are: California Golf Club, CA; Desert Forest Golf Club, AZ; Old Macdonald, OR; Country Club of Waterbury, CT; Worcester CC, MA; Keney Park, CT; Country Club of Mobile, AL; Meadowbrook CC, MI; Meadow Brook Club, NY; Kennett Square G&CC, PA.

=== Other ===
Klein graduated from Binghamton University in New York with a Bachelor of Arts degree in 1976. He went on to earn an M.A. and Ph.D. in political science from the University of Massachusetts at Amherst in 1984. He spent 14 years as a professor of political science and wrote a book with Cambridge University Press on U.S. nuclear deterrence strategy.

== Awards ==
- Bacardi Award for Environmental Reporting, Society of Professional Journalists (1997)
- USGA International Book award for Discovering Donald Ross (2001)
- Golf Writers Association of America annual writing award for best magazine column: "When 'love' hurts" (2006)
- Inductee, Caddie Hall of Fame (2006)
- Donald Ross Award for lifetime achievement, American Society of Golf Course Architects (2015)
