= Josh Flitter =

American actor (born 1994)

- Born: Joshua Alexander Flitter; August 25, 1994 (age 32); Ridgewood, New Jersey, U.S.
- Occupation: Actor
- Years active: 2000–present

External image
- Flitter at an event for Flushed Away in 2006

Joshua Alexander Flitter (born August 25, 1994) is an American actor. He is known for playing Corky in Nancy Drew, Eddie in The Greatest Game Ever Played, and voiced Rudy Kangaroo in the 2008 animated film Horton Hears a Who! and Budderball in the Air Bud film series.

== Life and career ==
Flitter was born on August 25, 1994, in Ridgewood, New Jersey to parents Carla, who appeared in Broadway and regional musicals, and Steve. Flitter attended Marlboro High School and graduated in 2012. In 2016, he graduated from New York City's School of Visual Arts with a major in filmmaking. As of 2020, Flitter ran a Twitter account, in which he produced short vlogs and sketch videos. He regularly states to his viewers that he wishes to one day return to his childhood stardom.

== Filmography ==
=== Movies ===
| Year | Film | Role | Notes |
|---|---|---|---|
| 2004 | Eternal Sunshine of the Spotless Mind | Young Bully | |
| 2005 | Duane Hopwood | Jake | |
| 2005 | Hide and Seek | Little Boy | Uncredited |
| 2005 | The Greatest Game Ever Played | Eddie Lowery | Nominated – Young Artist Award for Best Performance in a Feature Film - Supporting Young Actor |
| 2006 | Big Momma's House 2 | Stewart | Nominated – Young Artist Award for Best Performance in a Feature Film - Supporting Young Actor |
| 2006 | Air Buddies | Budderball | Voice role |
| 2007 | Nancy Drew | Corky Veinshtein | Nominated – Young Artist Award for Best Performance in a Feature Film - Young Ensemble Cast |
| 2007 | License to Wed | Choir Boy | |
| 2008 | Snow Buddies | Budderball | Voice role |
| 2008 | Horton Hears a Who! | Rudy Kangaroo | Voice role |
| 2009 | Space Buddies | Budderball | Voice role |
| 2009 | Santa Buddies | Budderball | Voice role |
| 2010 | Snowmen | Jason Bound | |
| 2010 | The Search for Santa Paws | T-Money | Voice role |
| 2011 | The Legend of Igoe Road | | Short film |
| 2012 | Santa Paws 2: The Santa Pups | Brutus | Voice role |
| 2013 | Hallows' Eve | Marty | |
| 2015 | Chasing Yesterday | Charlie | |
| 2015 | Why Me | Good Kid | Short film |
| 2017 | Pup Star: Better 2Gether | Ruff | Voice role |
| 2019 | Newport, Rhode Island Case #191263D | | Short film Also co-writer and co-director |
| 2019 | Two Percent | Sam | Short film Also writer and director |
| 2021 | Exposer | The Exposed | Short film |
| 2024 | Drive-Away Dolls | Bellboy | |

=== Television ===
| Year | Film | Role | Notes |
|---|---|---|---|
| 2000 | Blue's Clues | Steve's Friend | Episode: "What's So Funny?" |
| 2003 | My Life with Men | Patrick | TV movie |
| 2003 | Whoopi | Cub Scout #2 | Episode: "Once Bitten" |
| 2004 | Ed | Little Tommy | Episode: "Back in the Saddle" |
| 2005 | Stephen's Life | Stephen Silver | TV movie |
| 2005 | Phil of the Future | Nathan | Episode: "Maybe-Sitting" |
| 2006 | Prodigy/Bully | Henry Tammer | TV movie |
| 2008 | ER | Unicycle Boy | Episode: "Under Pressure" |
| 2009 | Ace Ventura Jr.: Pet Detective | Ace Ventura, Jr. | TV movie |
| 2013 | 30 Rock | Duncan | Episode: "Florida" |
| 2017 | Neverland the Larp Sitcom | Kane | Episode: "A Larper" |
| 2017 | Saturday Night Live | Spelling Bee Contestant / Dancer | 2 episodes Uncredited |
| 2018 | The Marvelous Mrs. Maisel | Art | Episode: "Mid-way to Mid-town" |
| 2018 | How to Do Everything | Philip | Episode: "How to Level Up" |
