= The Greatest Game Ever Played =

2005 film by Bill Paxton

- Theatrical release poster
- Directed by: Bill Paxton
- Screenplay by: Mark Frost
- Based on: The Greatest Game Ever Played: A True Story by Mark Frost
- Produced by: David Blocker; Larry Brezner; Mark Frost
- Starring: Shia LaBeouf; Stephen Dillane; Peter Firth; Elias Koteas
- Cinematography: Shane Hurlbut
- Edited by: Elliot Graham
- Music by: Brian Tyler
- Production company: Walt Disney Pictures
- Distributed by: Buena Vista Pictures Distribution
- Release date: September 30, 2005
- Running time: 120 minutes
- Country: United States
- Language: English
- Budget: $25 million
- Box office: $15.4 million

The Greatest Game Ever Played is a 2005 American biographical sports film based on the early life of amateur golf champion Francis Ouimet and his surprise winning of the 1913 U.S. Open. The film was directed by Bill Paxton, and was his last film as a director. Shia LaBeouf plays Ouimet. The film's screenplay was adapted by Mark Frost from his 2002 book, The Greatest Game Ever Played: Harry Vardon, Francis Ouimet, and the Birth of Modern Golf. It was shot in Montreal, Quebec, Canada, with the Kanawaki Golf Club, in Kahnawake, Quebec, the site of the golf sequences.

== Plot ==
Set mainly in 1913, the film is about Francis Ouimet, the first amateur to win the U.S. Open. Amateur golf in that era was a sport only for the wealthy, and Francis came from an Irish and French-Canadian immigrant family that was part of the working class. Francis watches an exhibition by legendary Jersey golf pro Harry Vardon as a 7-year-old boy, and becomes very interested in golf. He begins as a caddie at The Country Club, a posh enclave located across the street from his home in suburban Brookline, Massachusetts, while making friends with the other caddies. He works on his own golf game at every chance, and gradually accumulates his own set of clubs. Francis practices putting at night in his room. He wins the Massachusetts Schoolboy Championship.

One day, a club member, Mr. Hastings, asks Francis to play with him over The Country Club course, where caddies have almost no access of their own, and he shoots a fine round of 81 despite a 9 on one hole. His talent, composure, and good manners earn admirers and interest. With the help of Mr. Hastings and the Club Caddiemaster, Francis gets a chance to play in an upcoming tournament, the U.S. Amateur, the local qualifying which is to be held at the very same Country Club course. However, his father Arthur tells him to quit golf and get a "real job". Francis needs $50 for the entry fee, and so agrees to get a real job and never play golf again if he cannot qualify; his father lends him the money. On the 18th, Francis faces a three-foot putt that would secure him a spot in the championship, but he looks over and his father is watching. Francis is distracted, misses and falls one stroke short of qualifying for the championship proper.

With much jeer from the rich folk, Francis, now 20, fulfills his promise to his father and works at a sporting goods shop, while continuing to live at home. After some time with his golf forgotten, Francis is still at the bottom of the working class. But one day, the president of the United States Golf Association enters the store and personally invites him to play in the upcoming U.S. Open. After some maneuvering and consideration from his employer, Francis secures entry. Arthur informs him that he must find his own place to live after the tournament, and Francis agrees to this arrangement. However, his mother Mary, having been supportive of Francis's interest in golf from the start, admonishes Arthur for failing to recognize Francis's talent and the value of showcasing that talent in an important tournament.

Francis competes in the 1913 U.S. Open that takes place at The Country Club. The favorites are British champions Vardon and Ted Ray, who are accompanied by the snobbish Lord Northcliffe, and the reigning U.S. Open champion, John McDermott. Northcliffe looks to see that either Vardon or Ray wins the Open, to affirm British dominance over the Americans in golf, and also to prove that only gentlemen are able champions. Francis competes with his 10-year-old friend, Eddie Lowery, who skips school to caddie for Francis. After the first two rounds, Vardon and Ray have a seemingly comfortable lead, with McDermott unable to keep up. After some initial struggles, Francis rallies and ultimately ties with Vardon and Ray at the conclusion of the fourth round, resulting in the three of them competing in an 18-hole playoff to determine the champion. The night before, Northcliffe mocks Francis's social status to Vardon. Exasperated, Vardon, who hails from humble beginnings himself, angrily tells Northcliffe that if Francis wins, it will be solely due to his skill, not his background. Vardon also reminds Northcliffe that a gentleman would not begrudge Francis the respect he deserves.

The playoff round begins, with all three competitors neck and neck until the back nine, where Ray begins to fall behind, leaving Francis leading Vardon by a single stroke as they approach the final hole. Vardon concludes with a par, setting the stage for Francis to secure victory with a par of his own. Sensing Francis's nerves before the crucial putt, Eddie offers reassurance, enabling Francis to sink the putt and claim the U.S. Open title. Amidst the jubilant crowd lifting them on their shoulders, individuals start offering money to Francis, who graciously declines all but one bill, offered by his proud father. Inside the clubhouse, Vardon extends his private congratulations to Francis and proposes a friendly round together in the future. Francis and Eddie make their way home proudly carrying the U.S. Open trophy.

The epilogue explains that Harry Vardon went on to win his sixth British Open Championship the following year, Francis Ouimet won two amateur championships and became a businessman, and Eddie Lowery became a multi-millionaire, remaining lifelong friends with Francis.

== Historical accuracy ==
The movie shows a dramatic finish in the playoff, with Ouimet sinking a putt on the 18th hole to win the Championship by a single stroke. In reality, Ouimet finished birdie-par on 17 and 18 to Vardon's bogey-double bogey to end the playoff five strokes clear of Vardon and six ahead of Ray. The movie also shows the playoff as being in fair weather, and moves the rain to the third round. In the movie the historical 17th hole plays as a "dog leg right" when in fact at Brookline Country Club is played as a "dog leg left".

== Cast ==
- Shia LaBeouf as Francis Ouimet
  - Matthew Knight as Young Francis
- Stephen Dillane as Harry Vardon
  - James Paxton as Young Harry
- Peter Firth as Lord Northcliffe
- Elias Koteas as Arthur Ouimet
- Stephen Marcus as Ted Ray
- Josh Flitter as Eddie Lowery
- Len Cariou as Stedman Comstock
- Peyton List as Sarah Wallis
  - Amanda Tilson as Young Sarah
- Luke Askew as Alec Campbell
- Michael Weaver as John McDermott
- Marnie McPhail as Mary Ouimet
- George Asprey as Wilfred Reid
- Justin Ashforth as Ted Hastings
- Robin Wilcock as Bernard Darwin
- Max Kasch as Freddie Wallis
- Jonathan Higgins as Embry Wallis
- Luke Kirby as Frank Hoyt
- Nicolas Wright as Phillip Wainwright
- Michael Sinelnikoff as Lord Bullock
- Tim Peper as Walter Gibbs
- Walter Massey as William Howard Taft
- Mike 'Nug' Nahrgang as Baritone
- Jesse Rath as Runner

== Reception ==
=== Box office ===
The film opened at #9 at the U.S. box office in its opening weekend grossing US$3,657,322.

=== Critical ===
The film received generally positive reviews, from golf fans and non fans of the sport alike. Roger Ebert gave it three out of four stars, stating it gave the real history of the greatest golf match with a strong human element while showing the golf play in a "gripping story". He notes that he is "not a golf fan but found (it) absorbing all the same... Paxton and his technicians have used every trick in the book to dramatize the flight and destination of the golf balls. We follow balls through the air, we watch them creep toward the green or stray into the rough, we get not only an eagle's-eye view but a club's-eye view and sometimes, I am convinced, a ball's-eye view." Larry King proclaimed it "every bit as good as Seabiscuit."

On the review aggregation website Rotten Tomatoes, 62% of critics gave the film a positive "fresh" review. The website concludes, "Despite all the underdog sports movie conventions, the likable cast and lush production values make The Greatest Game Ever Played a solid and uplifting tale."

Audiences polled by CinemaScore gave the film an average grade of "A" on an A+ to F scale.

=== Awards and accolades ===
Awards and accolades for The Greatest Game Ever Played
Year	Result	Award	Category	Recipients
2006	Nominated	ESPY Awards	Best Sports Movie	
2006	Nominated	Satellite Awards	Best Youth DVD	
2006	Nominated	Young Artist Awards	Best Performance in a Feature Film - Supporting Young Actor	Josh Flitter

== Home media ==
The film has been released on DVD and UMD by Walt Disney Home Entertainment. Special features include two "making of" documentaries with cast and crew members, plus a rare 1963 interview with the real Francis Ouimet on WGBH, the Boston public television station, at Brookline, Massachusetts golf course where the 1913 U.S. Open took place. It was released on Blu-ray Disc in 2009, and again as a DVD/Blu-ray combo pack in 2011. It is now available to stream via Disney+ as of 2019.
