= 1913 U.S. Open (golf) =

Coordinates: 42.315°N 71.148°W

Tournament information
- Dates: September 18–20, 1913
- Location: Brookline, Massachusetts
- Course: The Country Club
- Organized by: USGA
- Format: Stroke play − 72 holes

Statistics
- Par: 73
- Length: 6,235 yards (5,701 m)
- Field: 66 players, 54 after cut
- Cut: 165 (+19)
- Winner's share: ($300)

Champion
- (United States) Francis Ouimet (a)
- 304 (+12), playoff

Location in the United States
Location in Massachusetts

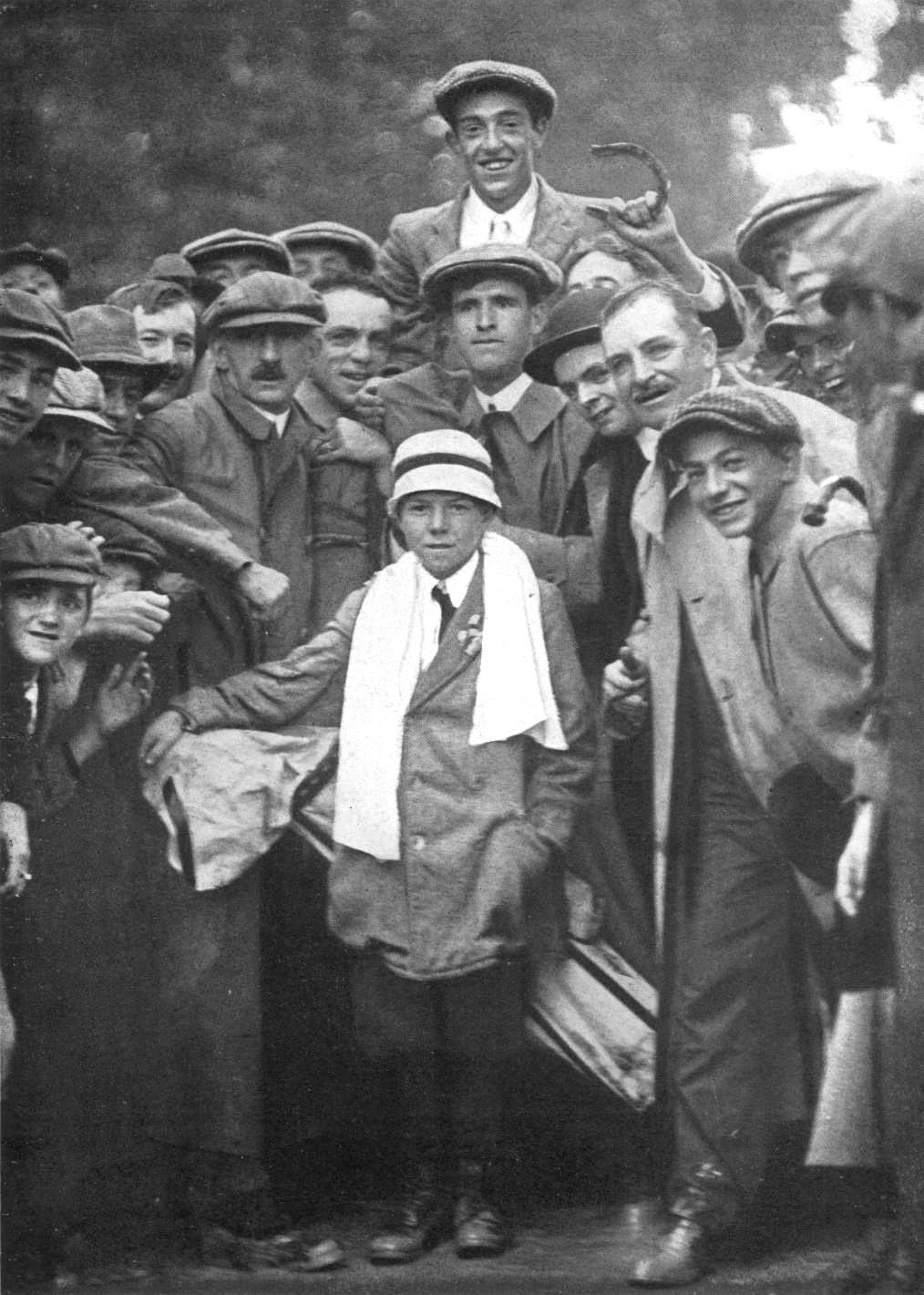
1913 winner Francis Ouimet holding a horseshoe; with Eddie Lowery his 10-year-old caddy, with a white towel around his neck

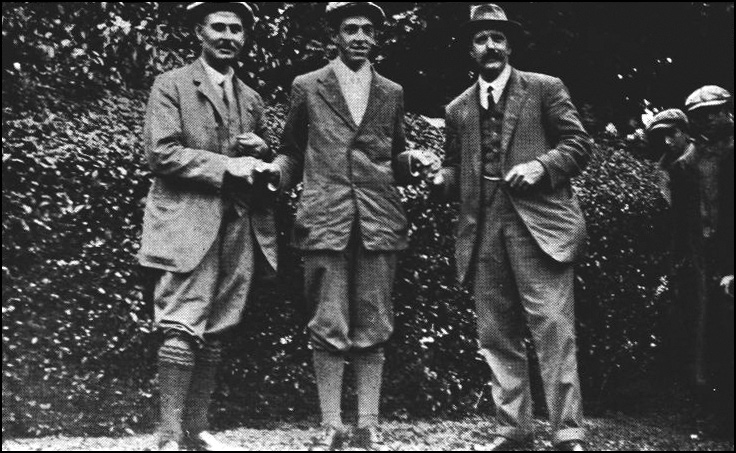
Vardon, Ouimet, and Ray

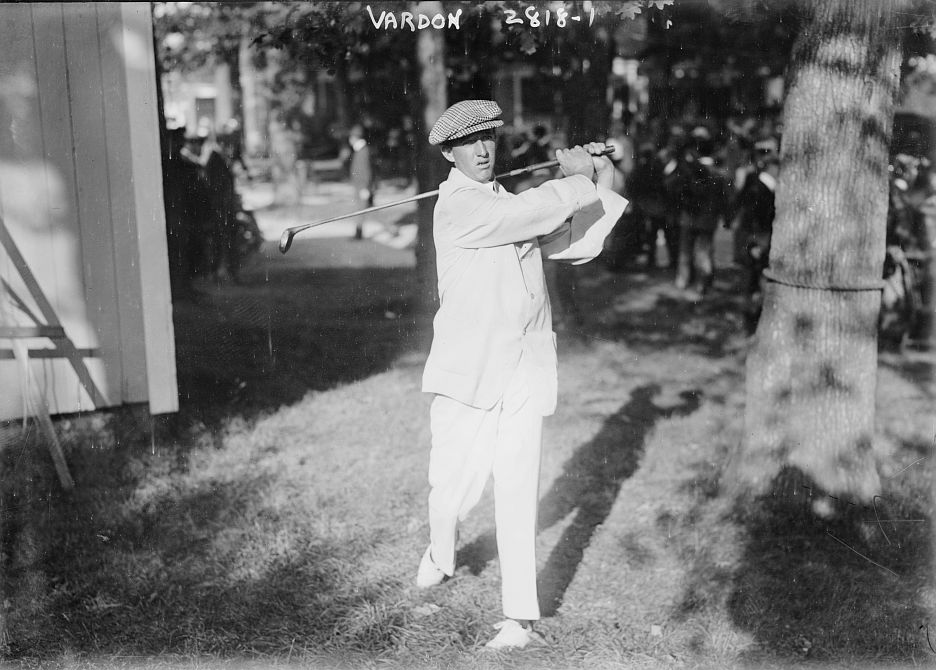
Vardon at the 1913 U.S. Open

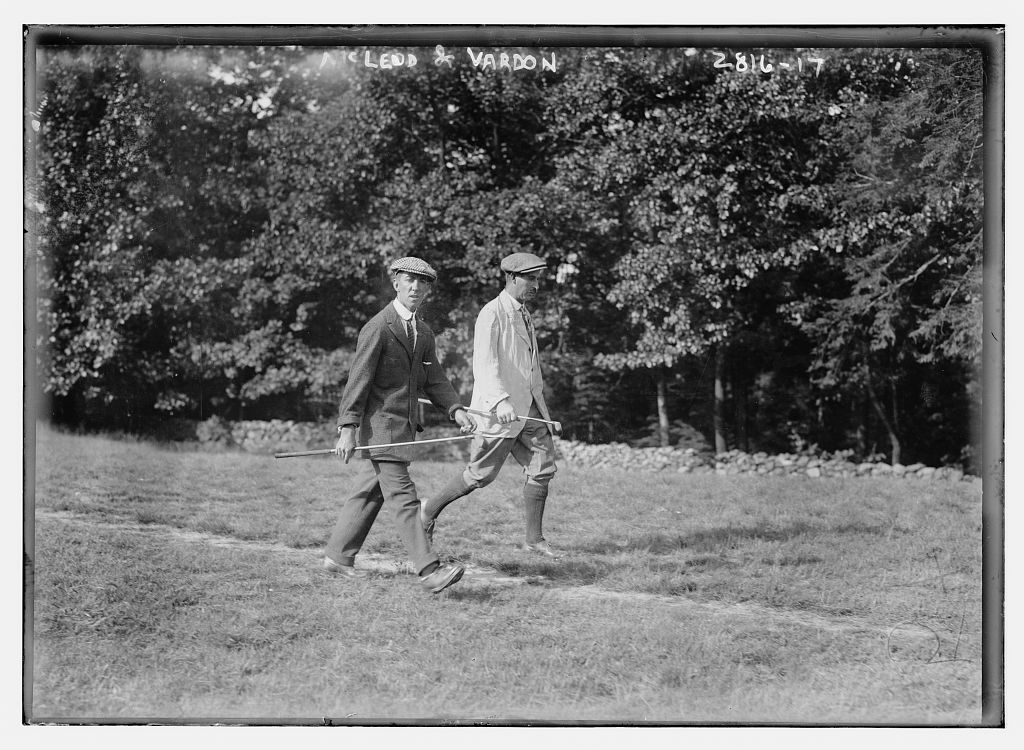
Fred McLeod and Harry Vardon at the 1913 U.S. Open

The 1913 U.S. Open was the 19th U.S. Open, held September 18–20 at The Country Club in Brookline, Massachusetts, a suburb southwest of Boston. Amateur Francis Ouimet, age 20, won his only U.S. Open title in an 18-hole playoff, five strokes ahead of Britons Harry Vardon and Ted Ray.

The four rounds were played over two days, Thursday and Friday. After 36 holes, Vardon and Wilfrid Reid co-led at 147 (+1), and after the third round on Friday morning, Ouimet, Vardon, and Ray were tied for the lead at 225 (+6). All three shot 79 in the afternoon and remained tied for the lead at the end of regulation at 304 (+12).

In the Saturday playoff round, all were tied at even-par 38 at the turn, then Ouimet had a bogey-free back nine 34 for 72 (−1), Vardon was second with 77, and Ray came in third with a 78. It was widely hailed as a stunning upset over the strongly-favored Britons and increased the popularity of the game in the United States.

Ouimet's victory was the first of eight wins by amateurs at the U.S. Open; Bobby Jones won four and the last was Johnny Goodman in 1933, 93 years ago.

The U.S. Open returned to the course for the 50th and 75th anniversaries in 1963 and 1988, and the U.S. Amateur was held at The Country Club on the centennial anniversary in 2013; it also hosted the Ryder Cup in 1999. All four events, except the 2013 U.S. Amateur, were won by Americans. The 2022 U.S. Open, again played at The Country Club, was won by Englishman Matt Fitzpatrick.

Vardon, the 1900 champion, won a sixth British Open in 1914. Ray, the British Open champion in 1912, won the U.S. Open in 1920.

The tournament inspired the Mark Frost book The Greatest Game Ever Played: Harry Vardon, Francis Ouimet, and the Birth of Modern Golf (2002). The book was adapted into the film The Greatest Game Ever Played (2005), directed by Bill Paxton.

== Course ==
Hole	Name	Yards	Par	Hole	Name	Yards	Par
1	Polo Field	430	5	10	Redan	140	3
2	Cottage	300	4	11	Stockton	390	4
3	Pond	435	5	12	Paddock	415	4
4	Hospital	300	4	13	Maiden	320	4
5	Newton	420	4	14	Quarry	470	5
6	Bakers	275	4	15	Liverpool	370	4
7	Plateau	185	3	16	Clyde	125	3
8	Corner	380	4	17	Elbow	360	4
9	Himalayas	520	5	18	Home	410	4
Out		3,245	38	In		2,990	35
Source:				Total		6,245	73

== Round summaries ==
=== First round ===
Thursday, September 18, 1913 (morning)

Place	Player	Score	To par
T1	(Scotland) Alec Ross	71	−2
T1	(Scotland) Macdonald Smith	71	−2
3	(United States) Jack Croke	72	−1
T4	(Scotland) Robert Andrews (a)	73	E
T4	(United States) Walter Hagen	73	E
T4	(United States) Tom McNamara	73	E
T5	(England) Jim Barnes	74	+1
T5	(United States) John McDermott	74	+1
T7	(United States) Fred Herreshoff (a)	75	+2
T7	(England) Wilfrid Reid	75	+2
T7	(England) Herbert Strong	75	+2
T7	(Jersey) Harry Vardon	75	+2

=== Second round ===
Thursday, September 18, 1913 (afternoon)

Place	Player	Score	To par
T1	(England) Wilfrid Reid	75-72=147	+1
T1	(Jersey) Harry Vardon	75-72=147	+1
T3	(Jersey) Ted Ray	79-70=149	+3
T3	(England) Herbert Strong	75-74=149	+3
T5	(England) Jim Barnes	74-76=150	+4
T5	(Scotland) Macdonald Smith	71-79=150	+4
T7	(United States) Walter Hagen	73-78=151	+5
T7	(United States) Francis Ouimet (a)	77-74=151	+5
T7	(Scotland) Alec Ross	71-80=151	+5
T7	(England) George Sargent	75-76=151	+5

=== Third round ===
Friday, September 19, 1913 (morning)

Place	Player	Score	To par
T1	(United States) Francis Ouimet (a)	77-74-74=225	+6
T1	(Jersey) Ted Ray	79-70-76=225	+6
T1	(Jersey) Harry Vardon	75-72-78=225	+6
4	(United States) Walter Hagen	73-78-76=227	+8
5	(England) Jim Barnes	74-76-78=228	+9
T6	(United States) John McDermott	74-79-77=230	+11
T6	(England) George Sargent	75-76-79=230	+11
T6	(Scotland) Macdonald Smith	71-79-80=230	+11
T9	(Ireland) Pat Doyle	78-80-73=231	+12
T9	(England) Herbert Strong	75-74-82=231	+12
T9	(France) Louis Tellier	76-76-79=231	+12

=== Final round ===
Friday, September 19, 1913 (afternoon)

Place	Player	Score	To par	Money ($)
T1	(United States) Francis Ouimet (a)	77-74-74-79=304	+12	Playoff
T1	(Jersey) Ted Ray	79-70-76-79=304	+12	Playoff
T1	(Jersey) Harry Vardon	75-72-78-79=304	+12	Playoff
T4	(United States) Walter Hagen	73-78-76-80=307	+15	78
T4	(England) Jim Barnes	74-76-78-79=307	+15	78
T4	(Scotland) Macdonald Smith	71-79-80-77=307	+15	78
T4	(France) Louis Tellier	76-76-79-76=307	+15	78
8	(United States) John McDermott	74-79-77-78=308	+16	50
9	(England) Herbert Strong	75-74-82-79=310	+18	40
10	(Ireland) Pat Doyle	78-80-73-80=311	+19	30

Amateurs: Ouimet (+12), Fownes (+20), Herreshoff (+26), Travers (+30)

==== Scorecard ====
Hole	1	2	3	4	5	6	7	8	9	10	11	12	13	14	15	16	17	18
Par	5	4	5	4	4	4	3	4	5	3	4	4	4	5	4	3	4	4
(United States) Ouimet	+6	+6	+6	+6	+8	+9	+9	+11	+11	+13	+13	+14	+13	+13	+13	+13	+12	+12
(Jersey) Vardon	+6	+7	+8	+9	+10	+10	+10	+10	+10	+10	+11	+11	+12	+12	+12	+12	+12	+12
(Jersey) Ray	+6	+7	+6	+8	+7	+7	+9	+10	+11	+12	+11	+12	+11	+11	+11	+12	+12	+12

Cumulative tournament scores, relative to par

Birdie	Bogey	Double bogey

=== Playoff ===
Saturday, September 20, 1913

Place	Player	Score	To par	Money ($)
1	(United States) Francis Ouimet (a)	38-34=72	−1	0
2	(Jersey) Harry Vardon	38-39=77	+4	300
3	(Jersey) Ted Ray	38-40=78	+5	150

==== Scorecard ====
Hole	1	2	3	4	5	6	7	8	9	10	11	12	13	14	15	16	17	18
Par	5	4	5	4	4	4	3	4	5	3	4	4	4	5	4	3	4	4
(United States) Ouimet	E	E	−1	−1	E	E	+1	E	E	E	E	E	E	E	E	E	−1	−1
(Jersey) Vardon	E	E	−1	−1	E	−1	E	E	E	+1	+1	+2	+1	+1	+1	+1	+2	+4
(Jersey) Ray	E	E	E	E	+1	+1	+1	E	E	+1	+1	+2	+2	+2	+4	+5	+6	+5
