= Caddie =

Person who carries golfers' clubs and provides assistance to golfers

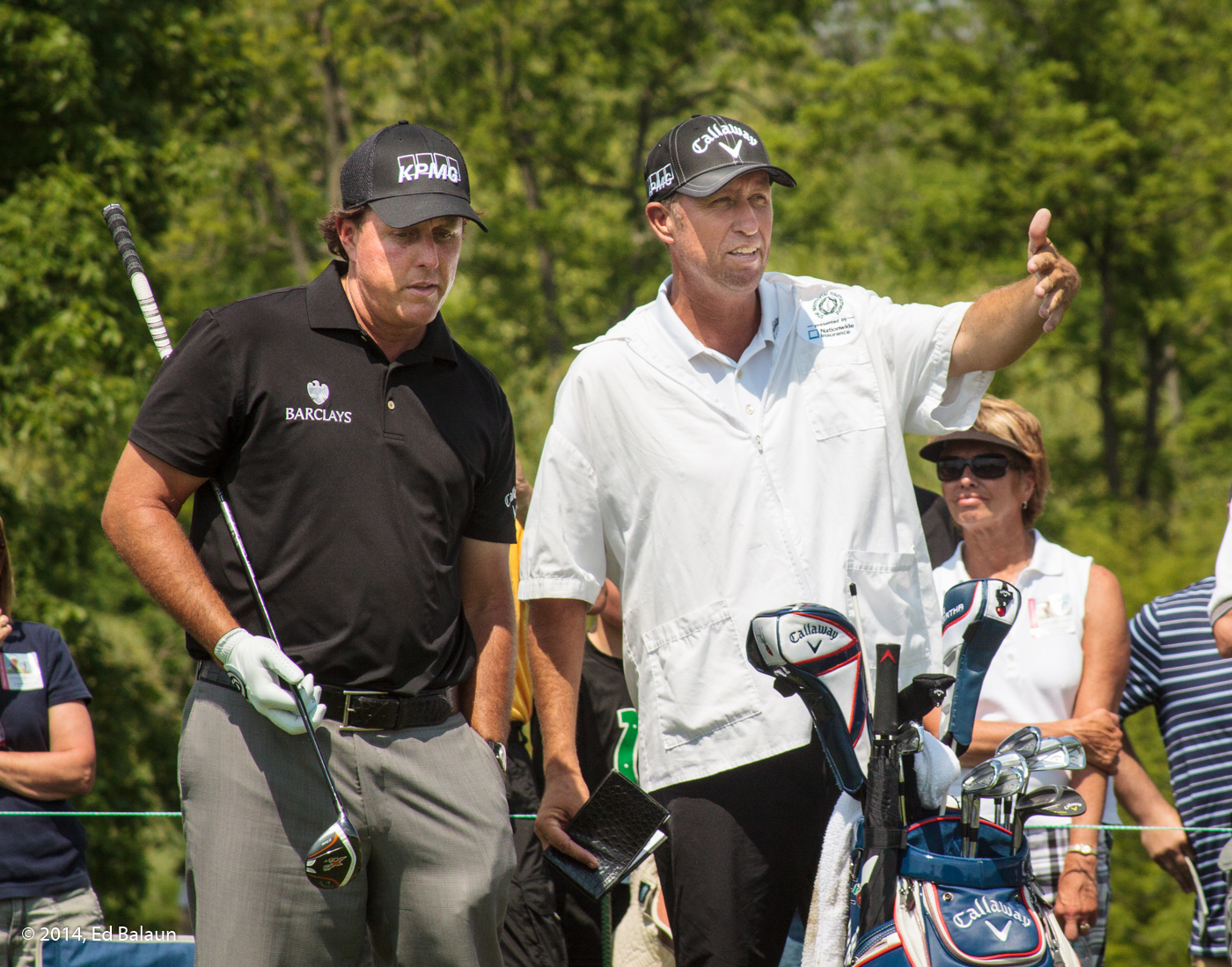
Phil Mickelson consults with his longtime caddy Jim "Bones" Mackay at Muirfield Village Golf Club in 2014.

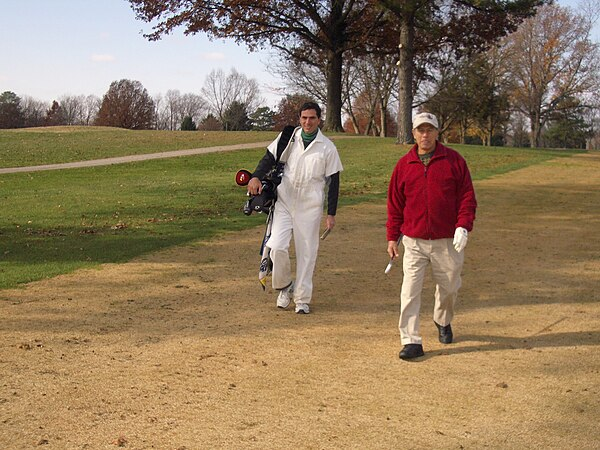
A caddie plies his trade.

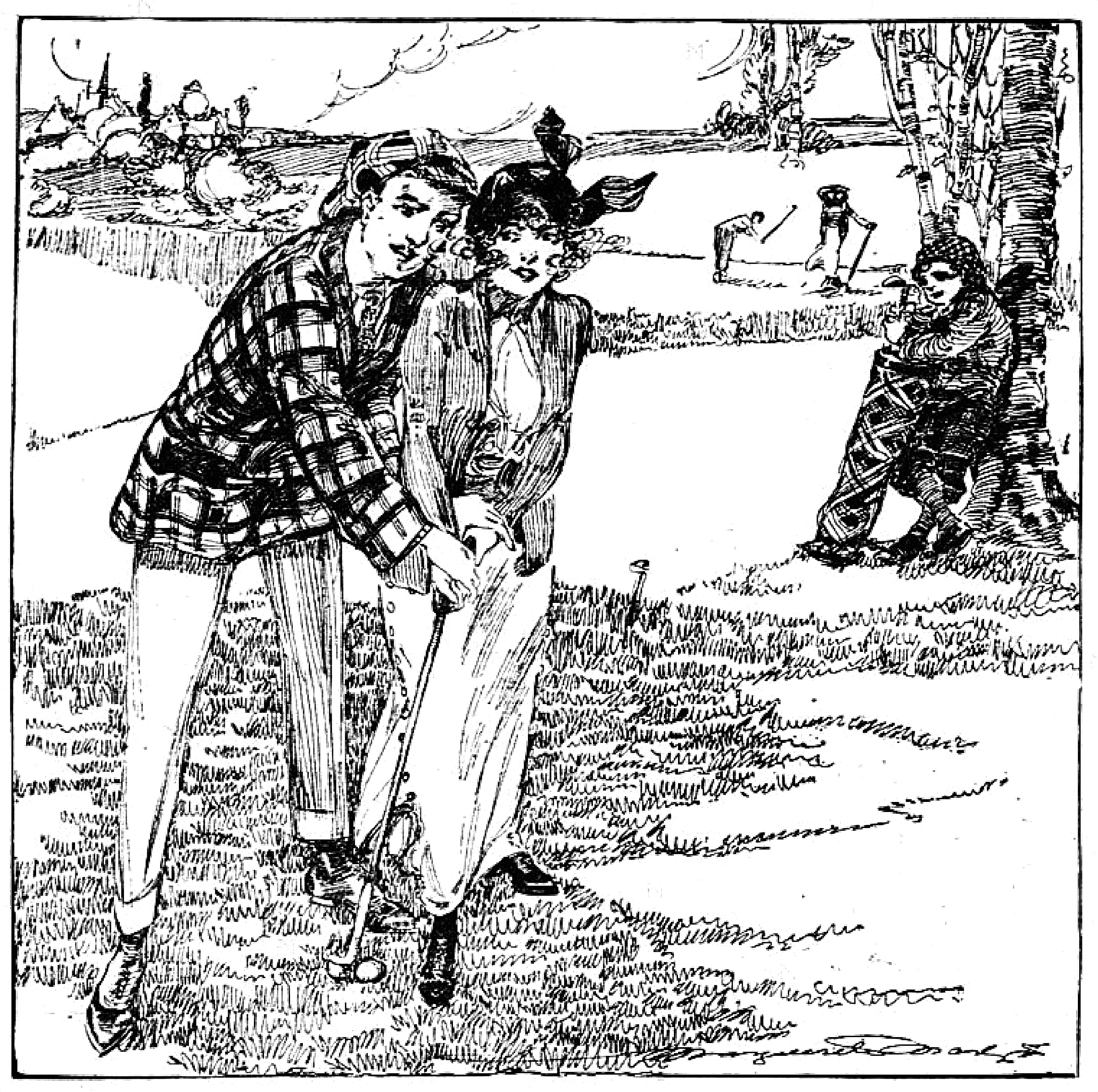
Imaginative drawing by journalist Marguerite Martyn of a couple at the Forest Park Golf Course, Forest Road, Missouri, in 1914, while a caddie leans against a tree.

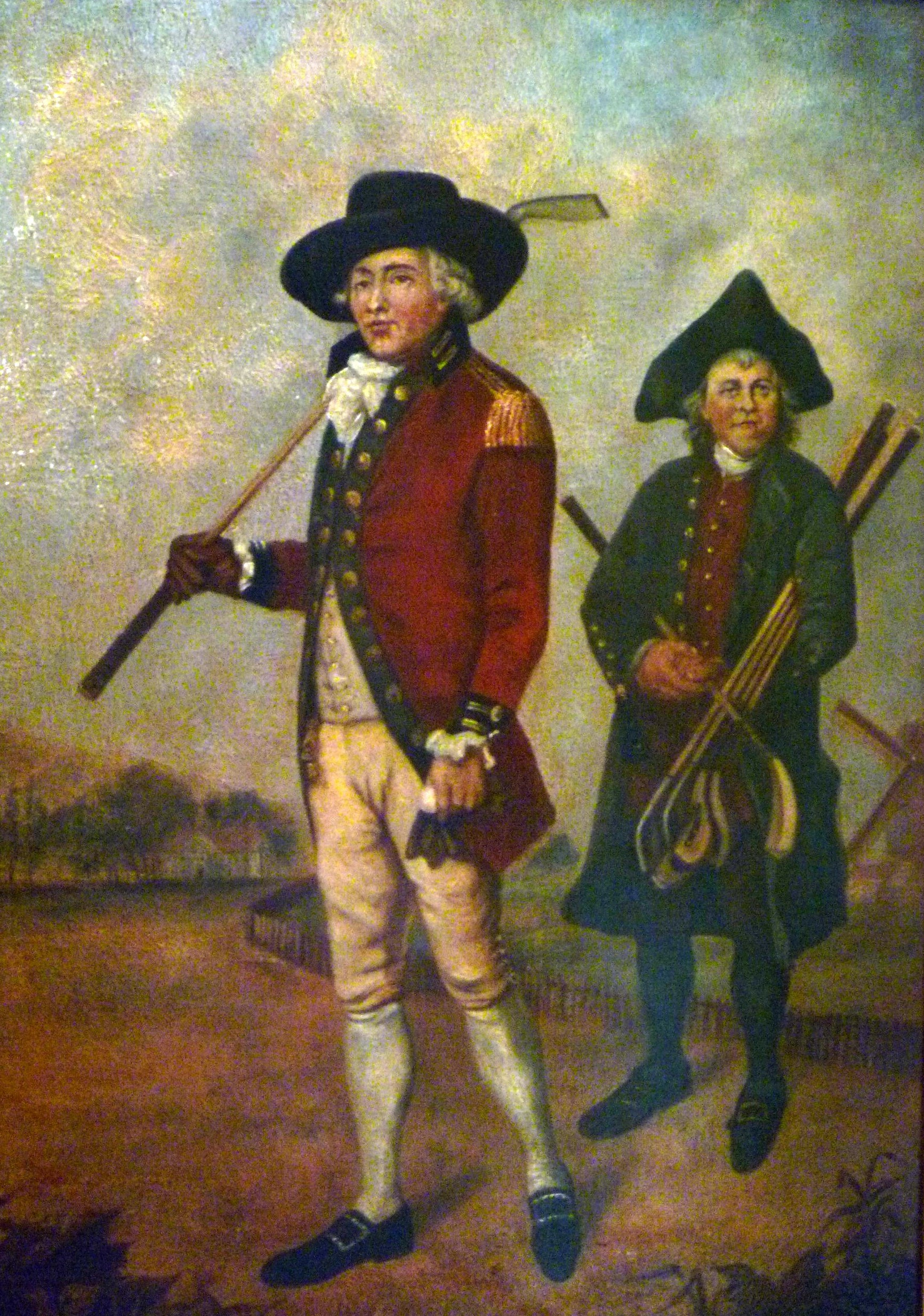
A golf caddie, 1790, by Lemuel Francis Abbott

In golf, a caddie (or caddy) is a companion to the player, providing both practical support and strategic guidance on the course. Caddies are responsible for carrying the player’s bag, managing clubs, and assisting with basic course maintenance like repairing divots and raking bunkers. Caddies may also offer insight on course strategy, such as club selection, reading greens, and evaluating weather conditions.

Other nicknames for the role are looper or jock.

== Etymology ==
The Scots word caddie or cawdy was derived in the 17th century from the French word cadet and originally meant a student military officer. It later came to refer to someone who did odd jobs. By the 19th century, it had come to mean someone who carried clubs for a golfer, or in its shortened form, cad, a man of disreputable behaviour.

== History ==
The first recorded use of a caddie was in Edinburgh in 1681 by the future James VII of Scotland when participating in the first international golf contest.

== Earnings ==
Caddies' pay is variable and is usually based on an allocated percentage share of prize money. At a professional level, caddies work in a high level partnership with golfers, some work as contractors to individual players in events. In 2020, caddies on the PGA European Tour became eligible to earn bonuses through sponsors' logos on their gear. In 2024, Golf Digest reported that Scottie Scheffler’s caddie Ted Scott earned $2.6 million over the season with the world number 1. Caddying fees range throughout courses across the world. Caddying is a popular role for low handicap golfers which can provide opportunities to work with a variety of people.

== In popular culture ==
Caddies have been depicted in television, films, and books, including:

- The Caddy, a 1953 musical comedy film starring Dean Martin and Jerry Lewis
- McAuslan in the Rough, a 1974 short story by George MacDonald Fraser in which a disreputable Scottish soldier caddies for his regimental sergeant major
- Caddyshack, a 1980 comedy film featuring Bill Murray
- Brown's Requiem, a 1981 crime novel by James Ellroy, who worked as a caddie while writing his first books
- The Legend of Bagger Vance, a 2000 film based on the 1995 book by Steven Pressfield, The Legend of Bagger Vance: A Novel of Golf and the Game of Life, features Vance as an angelic caddie.
- The Greatest Game Ever Played, a 2005 film about 1913 US open where Francis Ouimet (Shia LaBeouf) wins with his caddie Eddie Lowery (Josh Flitter).
- Loopers: The Caddie's Long Walk, a 2018 documentary narrated by Bill Murray

== See also ==
- Caddie Hall of Fame
