= Francis Ouimet =

American amateur golfer (1893–1967)

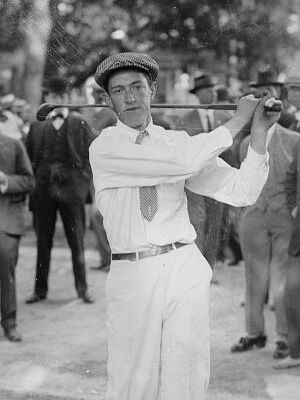
- Ouimet at the 1913 U.S. Open

Personal information
- Full name: Francis DeSales Ouimet
- Nationality: United States
- Born: May 8, 1893 Brookline, Massachusetts, U.S.
- Died: September 2, 1967 (aged 74) Newton, Massachusetts, U.S.
- Height: 6 ft 2 in (188 cm)
- Weight: 175 lb (79 kg; 12.5 st)
- Spouse: Stella Sullivan (m. 1918–1965)
- Children: Janice, Barbara

Career
- Sport: Golf
- Status: Amateur

Number of wins by tour
- PGA Tour: 1

Best results in major championships (wins: 3)
- Masters Tournament: WD: 1941
- PGA Championship: DNP
- U.S. Open: Won: 1913
- The Open Championship: T56: 1914
- U.S. Amateur: Won: 1914, 1931
- British Amateur: T3: 1923

Achievements and awards
- World Golf Hall of Fame: 1974 (member page)
- Bob Jones Award: 1955

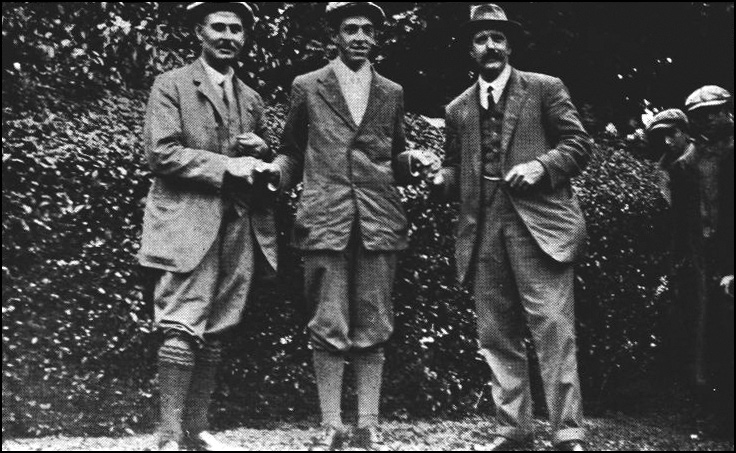
Playoff participants Harry Vardon, Ouimet, and Ted Ray

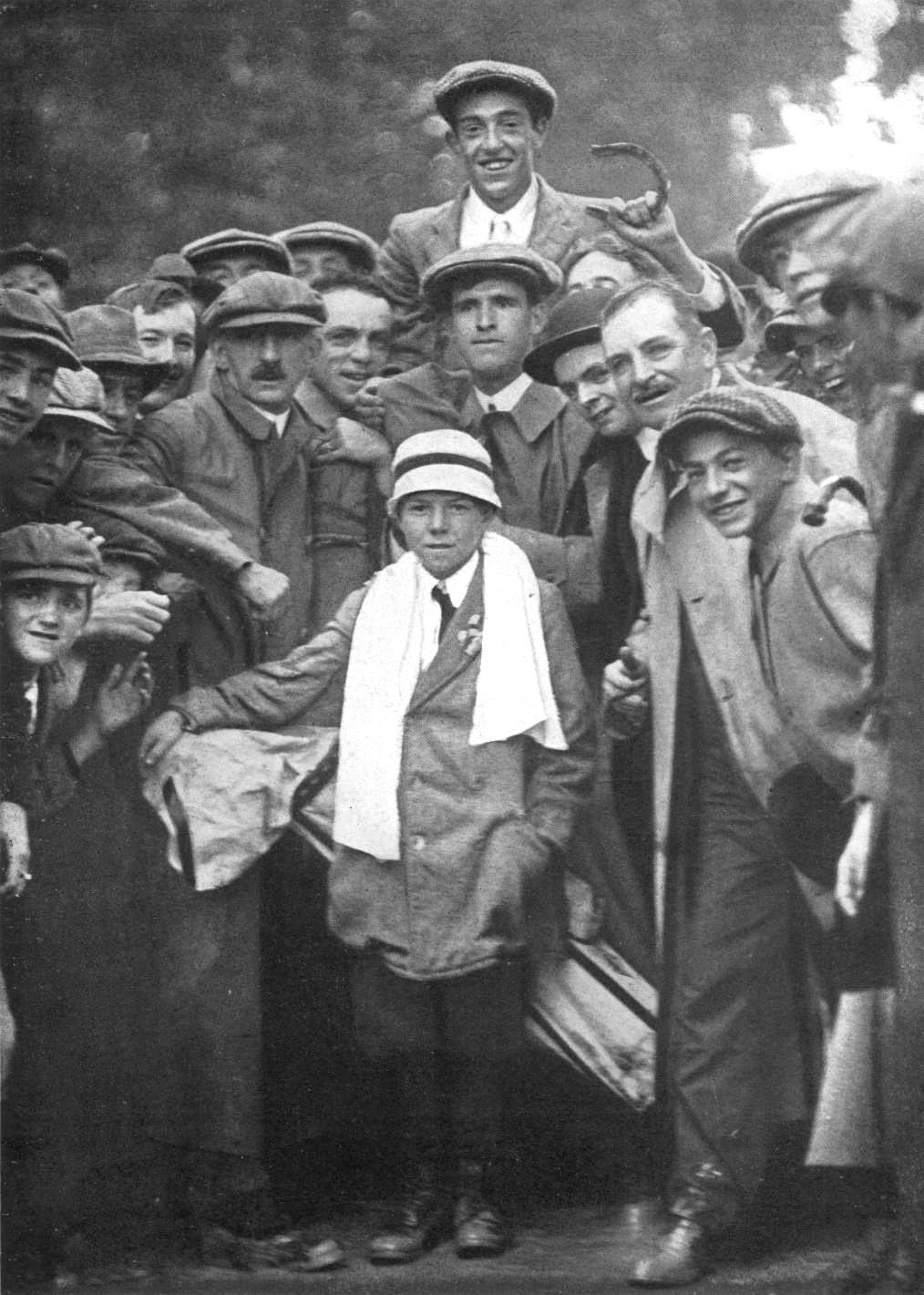
Ouimet celebrating his victory with Eddie Lowery, his 10-year-old caddie with a white towel over his shoulders

Francis DeSales Ouimet (/wiːˈmɛt/; May 8, 1893 – September 2, 1967) was an American amateur golfer who is frequently referred to as the "father of amateur golf" in the United States. He won the U.S. Open in 1913 and was the first non-Briton elected Captain of the Royal and Ancient Golf Club of St Andrews. He was posthumously inducted into the World Golf Hall of Fame in 1974.

== Early life ==
Ouimet was born to Mary Ellen Burke and Arthur Ouimet in Brookline, Massachusetts, a suburb of Boston. His father was a French-Canadian immigrant, and his mother was originally from Ireland. When Francis was four years old, his family purchased a house on Lee Street across from Clyde Street in Brookline, directly across from the 17th hole of The Country Club. The Ouimet family grew up relatively poor and were near the bottom of the economic ladder, which was hardly the position of any American golfer at the time. As far as the general public was concerned, amateur golf was reserved for the wealthy, while professional golf provided competition and income for former caddies, who were prohibited by the USGA from caddying after the age of 16 if they wanted to keep their amateur status.

Ouimet became interested in golf at an early age and started caddying at The Country Club at the age of 11. Using clubs from his brother and balls he found around the course, he taught himself to play. His game soon caught the eye of many country club members and caddie master Dan MacNamara. It was not long before Ouimet was the best high school golfer in the state. When he was a junior in high school, his father insisted that he drop out and do "something useful" with his life. Ouimet worked at a drygoods store before landing a job at a sporting goods store owned by future Baseball Hall of Famer George Wright.

== Golf career ==
=== 1913 U.S. Open ===
In 1913, Ouimet won his first significant title at age 20, the Massachusetts Amateur, an event he won five more times. He participated in the U.S. Amateur at the Garden City Golf Club on Long Island, New York, in early September, losing in the quarterfinals to the eventual champion, Jerome Travers. Soon after, he was asked personally by the president of the United States Golf Association, Robert Watson, if he would play in the national professional championship, the 1913 U.S. Open, which had been postponed to mid-September from its original June dates to allow for the participation of British golfers Harry Vardon and Ted Ray, both of Jersey. Vardon had won the U.S. Open in 1900 and The Open Championship five times to that point. Ray had won the Open Championship in 1912. The 1913 event was played at the course Ouimet knew best, The Country Club in Brookline, Massachusetts. Ouimet originally declined to play, having just returned from an absence from work to play in the National Amateur. His participation in the Open was soon arranged, however, with the cooperation of his employer.

It was Ouimet's first appearance in the championship. Eddie Lowery was his 10-year-old caddie. After 72 holes of regulation play ended in a three-way tie, Ouimet, Vardon, and Ray engaged in an 18-hole playoff the next day in rainy conditions. Ouimet won the playoff at one-under-par for the day, beating Vardon by 5 strokes and Ray by 6. His victory was widely hailed as a stunning upset over the strongly favored British, who were regarded as the top two golfers in the world. He was the first amateur to win the U.S. Open. The biggest crowds ever seen in American golf followed the playoff, and his achievement was front-page news across the country.

Ouimet's U.S. Open success is credited for bringing golf into the American sporting mainstream. Before his win over Vardon and Ray, golf was dominated by British players. In America, the sport was restricted to players with access to private facilities. There were very few public courses (the first, Van Cortlandt Golf Course in The Bronx borough of New York City, opened in 1895). Ten years after his 1913 victory, the number of American players had tripled and many new courses had been built, including numerous public ones.

Ouimet aspired to become a businessman to elevate himself into the middle class. The life of a professional golfer at that time did not offer an avenue to reach that goal. Within ten years of his U.S. Open victory, Ouimet had started to work as a banker and eventually a stock broker, which had always been his intention. He culminated his business career as a customer's financial advisor at Brown Brothers Harriman.

During the First World War he served in the US Army.

In 1963, WGBH-TV, Boston's public television station, aired an interview with Ouimet at The Country Club in Brookline, Massachusetts, to mark the 50th anniversary of his win at the 1913 U.S. Open. The kinescope of that interview was included in the DVD of the Walt Disney film The Greatest Game Ever Played. Disney's film took artistic license, portraying the win as having been by a single stroke when, in reality, Ouimet won by five strokes.

=== Controversy resolved ===
Ouimet never turned professional; he wished to remain an amateur for his whole career, as he decided before his U.S. Open success that he wanted to work in the world of business. In 1916, however, the USGA, in one of the most controversial decisions in their history, stripped Ouimet of his amateur status. Its reasoning was that he was using his celebrity status to aid his own sporting goods business and was therefore making a living from golf. This was at the time when caddies were not allowed to continue caddying after they reached the age of 16, unless they declared themselves professionals. The decision was greeted with uproar from Ouimet's fellow golfers. In 1918, Ouimet enlisted in the U.S. Army and rose to the rank of lieutenant. After the war, the USGA quietly reinstated his amateur status. Ouimet did not bear a grudge against the USGA and served on several committees. He was also a golf member of Charles River Country Club in Newton Centre, and was a member of the Woodland Golf Club of Auburndale.

Ouimet won his second U.S. Amateur in 1931. During the 1920s, he lost several close matches to Bobby Jones, who dominated amateur golf for that decade.

=== Later achievements ===
Ouimet won the U.S. Amateur twice (1914 and 1931). He played on the first eight Walker Cup Teams and was Captain of the next four for a team record of 11-1. In 1951, he became the first non-Briton elected Captain of the Royal and Ancient Golf Club of St Andrews and in 1955 was the first-ever winner of the Bob Jones Award, the highest honor given by the USGA, in recognition of distinguished sportsmanship in golf. Ouimet has been named to many golf halls of fame and has a room named after him in the USGA Museum.

Two other aspects of Ouimet's golf career are important: He used the overlapping grip to hold the club and was among the first top players to use this method. He very likely used the grip to emulate Vardon, who often is credited with developing the grip. Many great golf champions since have used this technique. The method is named for the "overlapping' of the little finger of the top hand between the forefinger and middle finger of the bottom hand. Ouimet mentored and encouraged the young Gene Sarazen, who developed into one of golf's greatest champions.

== Francis Ouimet Scholarship Fund ==
In 1949, a group of Ouimet's friends started a scholarship in his honor, naming it the Francis Ouimet Scholarship Fund. The scholarship was created to give college scholarship aid to young people who worked as caddies at clubs in Massachusetts. The inaugural class had 13 scholars who received a total of $4,600. Since then more than 6,300 students have been selected as Ouimet Scholars, receiving more than $43 million in need-based college tuition assistance. Today's requirements state that young people who have given at least two years of service to golf as caddies, worked in a pro shop operations, in course superintendent operations or "on-course" food and beverage in Massachusetts are eligible to receive the four-year renewable Scholarship.

The Ouimet Fund overview can be found at www.ouimet.org and is the second largest "caddie" scholarship in the U.S. and the largest independent scholarship fund in Massachusetts. Students complete a rigorous application and interview process, similar to the college process, before being selected as a Ouimet Scholar. The final step is an interview with a group of Ouimet Alumni, directors and/or donors. Once selected, students may attend any school they wish, and annually, these Scholars attend approximately 150 different colleges or universities across the country. Since the Ouimet Fund is a need-based scholarship, awards can range anywhere from a few thousand dollars to $80,000 or more over four years.

The Francis Ouimet Award for Lifelong Contributions to Golf was first presented in 1997 and is presented annually at the Francis Ouimet Scholarship Fund's banquet. Past winners include Arnold Palmer (1997), Peter Jacobsen (2006), Jack Nicklaus (2007), and Annika Sörenstam (2010) and in 2021 the Ouimet Fund honors broadcaster Jim Nantz.

== Depictions ==
In 1988 a portrait of Ouimet appeared on a commemorative 25-cent United States Postal Service postage stamp in his honor.

In 2002, Mark Frost wrote a biographical account of Ouimet's U.S. Open victory titled The Greatest Game Ever Played: Harry Vardon, Francis Ouimet, and the Birth of Modern Golf. Shortly afterward, Frost was tapped by Walt Disney Studios to write a motion picture adaptation. The Greatest Game Ever Played was released in theaters in 2005. The film starred Shia LaBeouf as Ouimet and was directed by Bill Paxton and produced by Larry Brezner.

Appearing on the cover of The Greatest Game is a photograph of Ouimet at the U.S. Open with his 10-year-old caddie, Eddie Lowery. This iconic image is one of the best known in American golf and was used as the logo for the United States Golf Association's Centennial celebrations. A statue of Ouimet and Lowery based on the photograph stands in Brookline, Massachusetts, and at the World Golf Hall of Fame in St. Augustine, Florida.

A street is named after Ouimet in Greenside, Johannesburg, South Africa, close to the Parkview Golf Course. A number of adjacent streets are also named after golfers, although the street in Johannesburg is named Quimet Street. How the misspelling occurred is not known. The street is still sometimes pronounced (correctly) without the Q, while it is also sometimes pronounced in the French way (Wee-May).

== Personal life ==
Ouimet married Stella M. Sullivan on September 11, 1918. They had two daughters: Janice Salvi and Barbara McLean.

Ouimet died in Newton, Massachusetts, on September 2, 1967, at age 74.

== Amateur wins ==
- 1913 Massachusetts Amateur
- 1914 **U.S. Amateur**, Massachusetts Amateur, French Open Amateur Championship
- 1915 Massachusetts Amateur
- 1917 Western Amateur
- 1919 Massachusetts Amateur
- 1920 North and South Amateur
- 1922 Massachusetts Amateur
- 1925 Massachusetts Amateur
- 1931 **U.S. Amateur**

Amateur major shown in bold.

== Professional wins (15) ==
=== PGA Tour wins (1) ===
- 1932 Massachusetts Open

=== Other wins (14) ===
- 1910 Woodland Golf Club Open
- 1911 Woodland Golf Club Open
- 1912 The Country Club Cup, Allston Golf Club Open Championship
- 1913 Meadow Brook Golf Club Open, **U.S. Open**
- 1915 Baltimore Country Club Spring Invitational
- 1922 Houston Invitational
- 1923 St. George's Challenge
- 1924 Crump Memorial
- 1925 Gold Mashie Tournament, Bermuda Handicap Tourney at Riddle's Bay
- 1927 Crump Memorial
- 1934 Boston Open

Professional major shown in bold.

== Major championships (3) ==
=== Professional wins (1) ===
Year	Championship	54 holes	Winning score	Margin	Runners-up
1913	U.S. Open	Tied for lead	+12 (77-74-74-79=304)	Playoff ^{1}	(Jersey) Harry Vardon, (Jersey) Ted Ray

^{1} Defeated Vardon and Ray in an 18-hole playoff – Ouimet 72 (−1), Vardon 77 (+4), Ray 78 (+5)

=== Amateur wins (2) ===
Year	Championship	Winning score	Runner-up
1914	U.S. Amateur	6 & 5	(United States) Jerome Travers
1931	U.S. Amateur	6 & 5	(United States) Jack Westland

=== Results timeline ===
Tournament	1910	1911	1912	1913	1914	1915	1916	1917	1918	1919
U.S. Open				**1** LA	T5	T35		NT	NT	T18
The Open Championship					T56	NT	NT	NT	NT	NT
U.S. Amateur	DNQ	DNQ	DNQ	R16	**1**	R16		NT	NT	QF
The Amateur Championship					R128	NT	NT	NT	NT	NT

Tournament	1920	1921	1922	1923	1924	1925	1926	1927	1928	1929
U.S. Open				T29		T3				
The Open Championship										
U.S. Amateur	2	R16 M	R16	SF	SF	DNQ	SF	SF	R32	SF
The Amateur Championship		R128		SF			R64			

Tournament	1930	1931	1932	1933	1934	1935	1936	1937	1938	1939
Masters Tournament	NYF	NYF	NYF	NYF						
U.S. Open										
The Open Championship										
U.S. Amateur	R32	**1**	SF		R256	R256	R64	WD		DNQ
The Amateur Championship	R32				R256				R64	

Tournament	1940	1941	1942	1943	1944	1945	1946	1947	1948	1949
Masters Tournament		WD		NT	NT	NT				
U.S. Open			NT	NT	NT	NT				
The Open Championship	NT	NT	NT	NT	NT	NT				
U.S. Amateur	DNQ		NT	NT	NT	NT				
The Amateur Championship	NT	NT	NT	NT	NT	NT		R32		R128

Tournament	1950
Masters Tournament	
U.S. Open	
The Open Championship	
U.S. Amateur	
The Amateur Championship	R128

Note: As an amateur, Ouimet could not play in the PGA Championship.

Win
Top 10
Did not play

M = Medalist
LA = Low amateur
NYF = Tournament not yet founded
NT = No tournament
WD = Withdrew
"T" indicates a tie for a place
DNQ = Did not qualify for match play portion
R256, R128, R64, R32, R16, QF, SF = Round in which player lost in match play

=== Summary ===
Tournament	Wins	2nd	3rd	Top-5	Top-10	Top-25	Events	Cuts made
Masters Tournament	0	0	0	0	0	0	1	-
U.S. Open	1	0	1	3	3	4	6	-
The Open Championship	0	0	0	0	0	0	1	-
U.S. Amateur	2	1	6	10	14	16	26	19
The Amateur Championship	0	0	1	1	1	3	10	-
Totals	3	1	8	14	18	23	44	19

- Most consecutive cuts made – 9 (1913 U.S. Amateur – 1924 U.S. Amateur)
- Longest streak of top-10s – 3 (1921 U.S. Amateur – 1923 The Amateur Championship, 1923 U.S. Amateur – 1925 U.S. Open)

== U.S. national team appearances ==
Amateur

- Walker Cup: 1922 (winners), 1923 (winners), 1924 (winners), 1926 (winners), 1928 (winners), 1930 (winners), 1932 (winners, playing captain), 1934 (winners, playing captain), 1936 (winners, playing captain), 1938 (non-playing captain), 1947 (winners, non-playing captain), 1949 (winners, non-playing captain)
