= The Country Club =

Country club in Boston, Massachusetts

Coordinates: 42°18′48″N 71°9′3″W

- Location in the United States Location in Massachusetts

Club information
- Location: Brookline, Massachusetts
- Established: 1882, 144 years ago
- Type: Private
- Total holes: 27
- Website: tcc1882.org
- Designed by: Willie Campbell (1895); Alex Campbell (1902); William S. Flynn (1927) Gil Hanse & Jim Wagner (2021 renovation)
- Par: 71
- Length: 7,033 yards (6,431 m)
- Course record: 64
- The Country Club in 2019

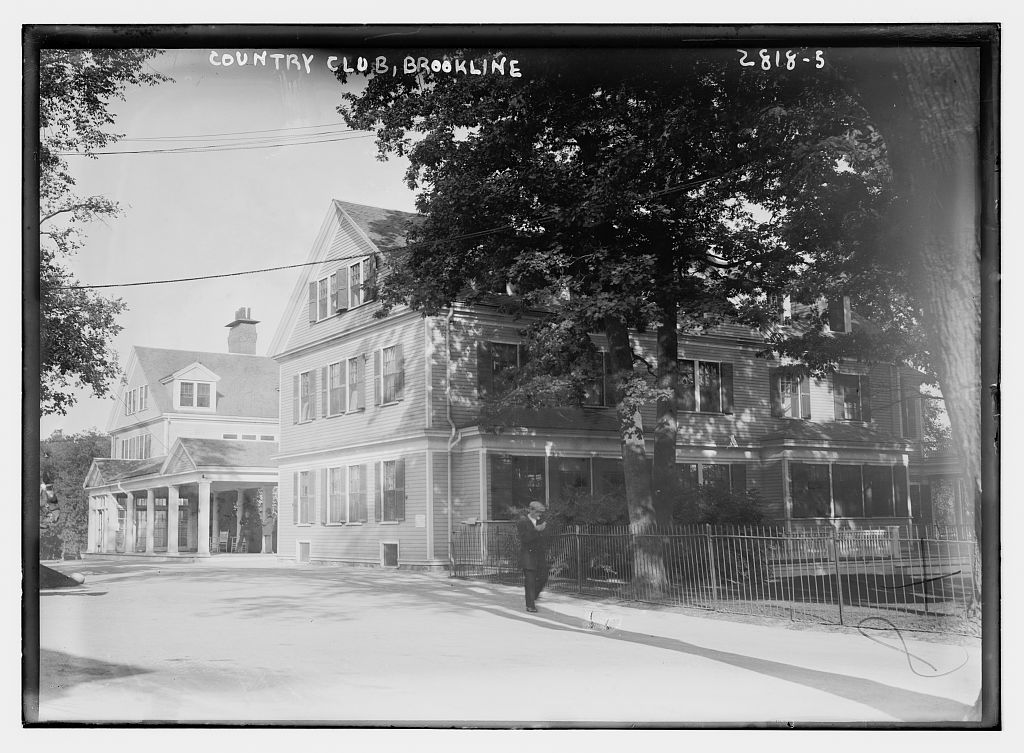
The Country Club in 1913

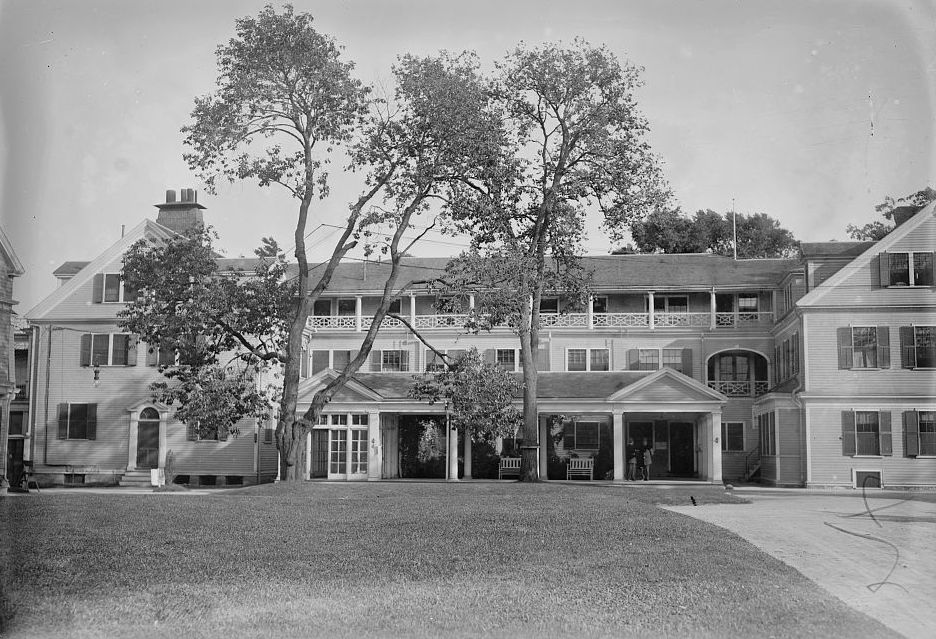
The Country Club in 1913

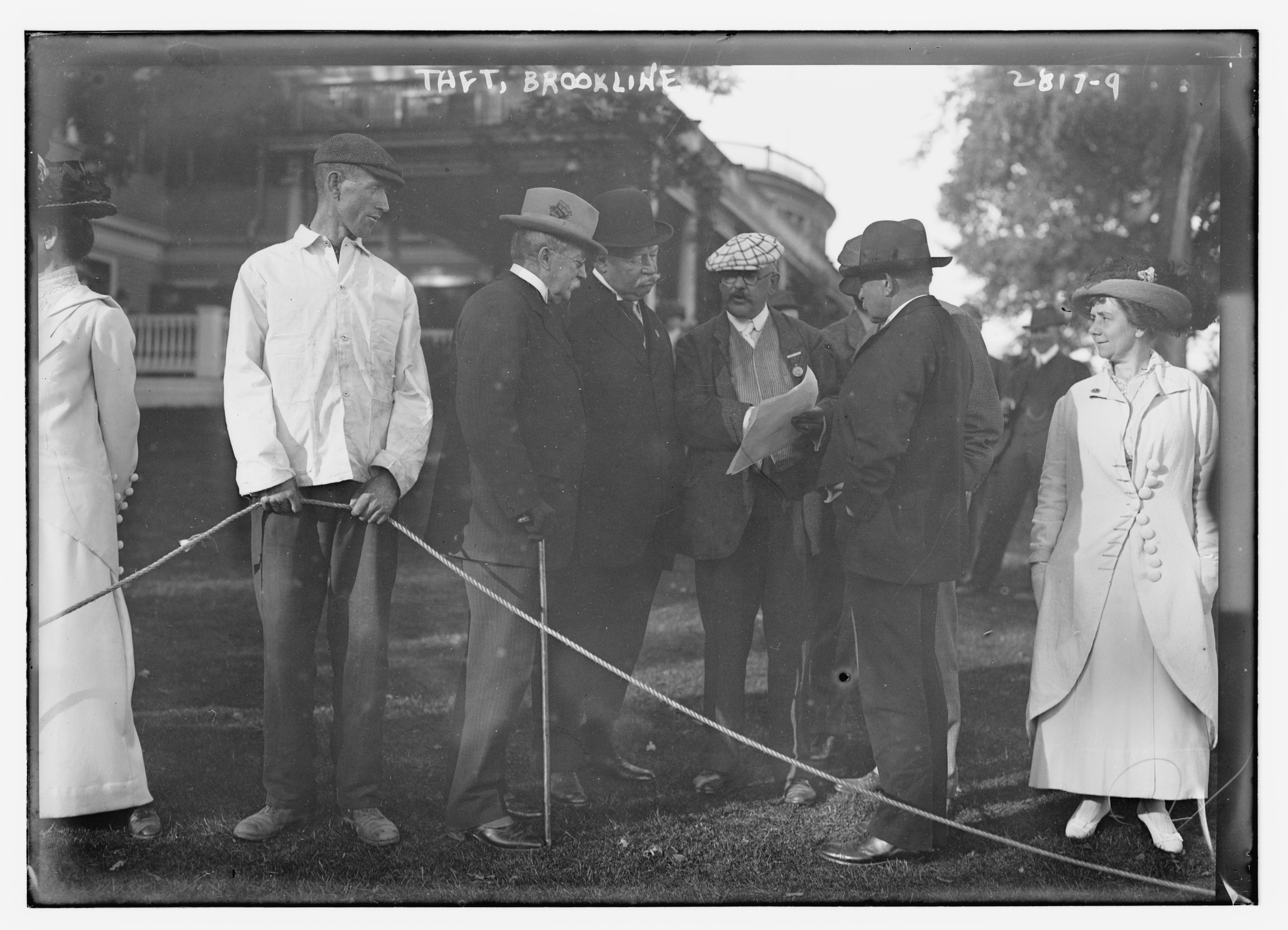
William Howard Taft at the 1913 U.S. Open

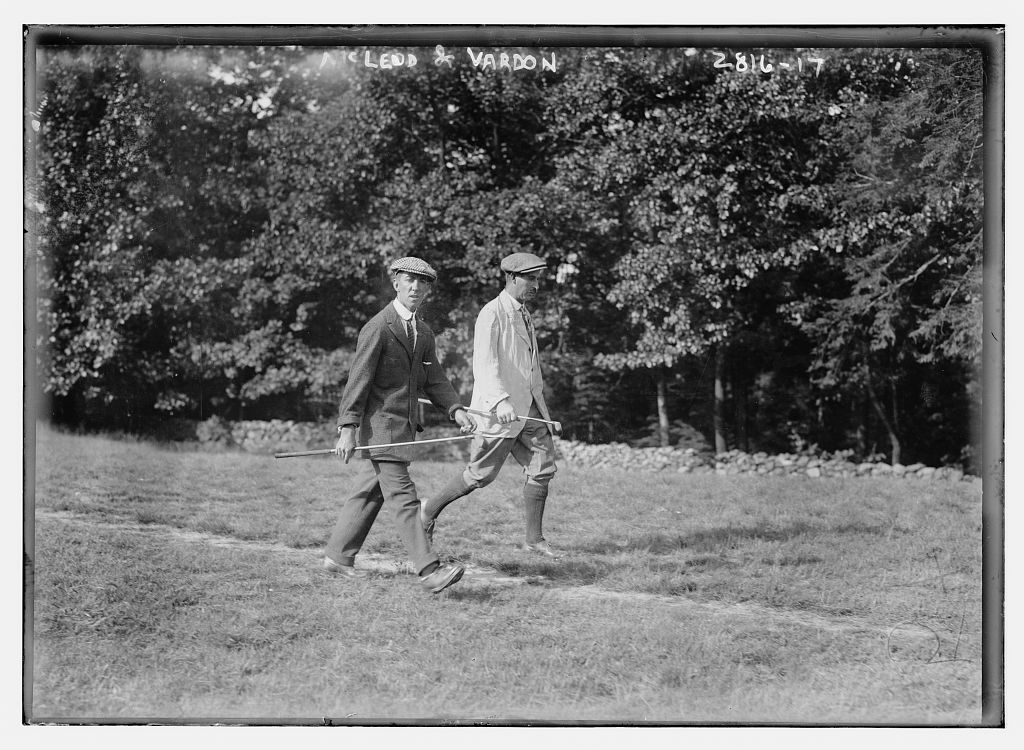
Fred McLeod and Harry Vardon at the 1913 U.S. Open

The Country Club, located in Brookline, Massachusetts, is the oldest golf-oriented country club in the United States. (Note: The Philadelphia Cricket Club, founded in 1854, was the first country club for any sport.) It holds an important place in golf history, as it is one of the five charter clubs that founded the United States Golf Association and has hosted numerous USGA tournaments, including the 1913 U.S. Open won by then-unknown Francis Ouimet. Although the club has approximately 1,300 members, it is known for its exclusivity.

== History ==
On January 14, 1882, a group of men from Boston met to form the club. The club is listed on the USGA's list of the first 100 clubs in America. The original club was focused on horseback-riding and other outdoor activities; the golf course was not built until 1893. For several years there were conflicts between golfers and other club members over land use; in fact the original golf course overlapped with the pre-existing race track.

The golf course itself grew in several stages, and so is not the result of any one architect. The first six holes were laid out by three club members in March 1893, and the following year the Scot, Willie Campbell, was brought in as club professional. He oversaw the expansion to nine holes that summer, and to a full 18 holes by 1899 following some land acquisition. Around 1902 the Haskell golf ball became widely used, necessitating a further lengthening of the course. After an additional land purchase, two club members designed three new holes which opened in 1908. Rees Jones renovated the course further in preparation for the 1988 U.S. Open.

In 1894 The Country Club was one of the five charter clubs which founded the United States Golf Association. The original purpose was to sponsor an undisputed national amateur championship, which was first held in 1895. The first U.S. Open (almost an afterthought) was held the following day. The first USGA championship held at the club was the 1902 U.S. Women's Amateur.

In 1896 the Club hired Scottish professional Alex Campbell, who would go on to serve as the head professional from 1896 to 1916. Campbell was in large part responsible for the development of caddie Francis Ouimet into a championship caliber player.

The 1913 U.S. Open was held at The Country Club. The heavy favorites were English legends Harry Vardon (1900 U.S. Open winner; four-time British Open winner) and Ted Ray (reigning British Open champion). After 72 holes the pair found themselves tied with 20-year-old amateur Francis Ouimet—who had grown up across the street from the course and was a former caddy at the club—forcing an 18-hole playoff the next day. In a shocking upset, Ouimet soundly defeated the two professional golfers in front of a large gallery, and the resulting newspaper stories captured the imagination of the American public. The number of golfers in the country at least tripled in the subsequent ten years, with a corresponding increase in golf courses (including many public courses, opening up the game to a larger segment of the population). The 1963 and 1988 U.S. Opens were also held at The Country Club, the 50th and 75th anniversaries of the Ouimet victory. However, the 2013 U.S. Open, marking the 100th anniversary of Ouimet's improbable win, was contested at Merion Golf Club near Philadelphia. The Country Club instead hosted the 2013 U.S. Amateur.

The story of Francis Ouimet's triumph at the 1913 US Open was commercialized by Mark Frost’s 2002 book, The Greatest Game Ever Played: Harry Vardon, Francis Ouimet, and the Birth of Modern Golf, which Frost then adapted for a 2005 film.

The club hosted the Ryder Cup in 1999. This intense match exploded into controversy following a competition-turning 45-foot putt on the 17th green by Justin Leonard (the same green where Ouimet effectively clinched his victory), as the other American players stormed the green in celebration before José María Olazábal had a chance to attempt his own difficult putt. Olazábal was forced to regain his focus after order was restored, and missed the putt. The contest has been referred to as the "Battle of Brookline".

The Country Club has long been considered the best course in Massachusetts and has hosted a record 10 Massachusetts State Amateur Championships.

== Golf courses ==
The golf facilities have a total of 27 holes, divided between two courses.

The Main Course is composed of the Clyde and Squirrel nines, essentially the original 18 holes. This was the course used for the 1913 U.S. Open, and is the course played by members today.

The other nine holes are the Primrose Course, an executive course built in 1927. This was designed by William S. Flynn, who also (re)designed Shinnecock Hills, Cherry Hills Country Club near Denver, and the Cascades Course at The Homestead, and the Kittansett Club also in Massachusetts.

The Championship, Composite, Anniversary, or Open Course is used for major competitions today, when a longer layout is required. In this configuration, three and a half holes from the Primrose Course are used to replace three holes of the Clyde. Specifically, one hole from the Main Course is replaced by a composite hole that uses the teeing ground of the 1st Primrose hole and the putting surface of the 2nd Primrose hole, while two other Main holes are replaced in their entirety by the 8th and 9th Primrose holes. Today, this results in a length of over 7,300 yards. This layout was first used in the 1957 U.S. Amateur, but its routing significantly changed for the 1963 U.S. Open. The 1963 routing was used for all major events at the club through the 2013 U.S. Amateur. The Championship Course was altered again for the 2022 U.S. Open, with the par-4 4th hole of the Main Course removed and the par-3 12th hole of the Main Course added, resulting in a 7,312-yard par-70 layout.

== Tournaments ==
=== Major championships ===
| Year | Major | Winner | Winning score | Margin of victory | Runner(s) up | Winner's share ($) |
|---|---|---|---|---|---|---|
| 2022 | U.S. Open (4) | (England) Matt Fitzpatrick | 274 (–6) | 1 stroke | (United States) Scottie Scheffler (United States) Will Zalatoris | 3,150,000 |
| 2013 | U.S. Amateur (6) | (England) Matt Fitzpatrick | 4 & 3 | | (Australia) Oliver Goss | N/A |
| 1999 | Ryder Cup (1) | United States | 14 1/2 to 13 1/2 | | Europe | N/A |
| 1995 | U.S. Women's Amateur (3) | (United States) Kelli Kuehne | 4 & 3 | | (Australia) Anne-Marie Knight | N/A |
| 1988 | U.S. Open (3) | (United States) Curtis Strange | 278 (–6) | Playoff | (England) Nick Faldo | 180,000 |
| 1982 | U.S. Amateur (5) | (United States) Jay Sigel | 8 & 7 | | (United States) David Tolley | N/A |
| 1963 | U.S. Open (2) | (United States) Julius Boros | 293 (+9) | Playoff | (United States) Jacky Cupit (United States) Arnold Palmer | 17,500 |
| 1957 | U.S. Amateur (4) | (United States) Hillman Robbins | 5 & 4 | | (United States) Dr. Frank M. Taylor | N/A |
| 1941 | U.S. Women's Amateur (2) | (United States) Betty Hicks Newell | 5 & 4 | | (United States) Helen Sigel | N/A |
| 1934 | U.S. Amateur (3) | (United States) Lawson Little | 8 & 7 | | (United States) David Goldman | N/A |
| 1922 | U.S. Amateur (2) | (United States) Jess Sweetser | 3 & 2 | | (United States) Chick Evans | N/A |
| 1913 | U.S. Open (1) | (United States) Francis Ouimet | 304 (+12) | Playoff | (Jersey) Ted Ray (Jersey) Harry Vardon | 300 |
| 1910 | U.S. Amateur (1) | (United States) William C. Fownes Jr. | 4 & 3 | | (United States) Warren Wood | N/A |
| 1902 | U.S. Women's Amateur (1) | (United States) Genevieve Hecker | 4 & 3 | | (United States) Louisa A. Wells | N/A |

=== Other tournaments ===
- 1905 Massachusetts Amateur, won by Arthur G. Lockwood
- 1908 Massachusetts Open, won by Alec Ross
- 1911 Massachusetts Open, won by Donald Ross
- 1915 Massachusetts Open, won by Walter Hagen
- 1920 Massachusetts Amateur, won by Fred Wright
- 1925 Massachusetts Amateur, won by Francis Ouimet
- 1932 Walker Cup, won by the United States over Great Britain & Ireland 9 1/2–2 1/2
- 1934 Massachusetts Amateur, won by William O. Blaney
- 1949 Massachusetts Amateur, won by Bobby Knowles
- 1953 U.S. Girls' Junior Amateur Championship, won by Mildred Meyerson
- 1967 Massachusetts Amateur, won by Barrie Bruce
- 1968 U.S. Junior Amateur, won by Eddie Pearce
- 1973 Walker Cup, won by the United States over Great Britain & Ireland 14–10
- 1976 Massachusetts Amateur, won by Bruce Douglass
- 1987 Massachusetts Amateur, won by Kevin Jones
- 2003 Massachusetts Amateur, won by Andy Drohen
- 2009 Massachusetts Amateur, won by Bill Drohen

== Notable members ==
- Tom Brady
- Gisele Bündchen
- Anne Nason

== Other facilities ==
In addition, the club has five indoor tennis courts, four outdoor tennis courts including grass courts, paddle & squash courts, an Olympic-sized swimming pool with a cafe, curling, skeet shooting, skating & hockey rink.
