= Burning Tree Club =

Private, all-male golf club in Bethesda, Maryland, US

Coordinates: 39°00′03″N 77°09′01″W

Aerial view of Burning Tree Club

Burning Tree Club is a private, all-male golf club in Bethesda, Maryland. The course at Burning Tree has been played by numerous presidents, foreign dignitaries, high-ranking executive officials, members of Congress, and military leaders. The course was designed by architect C.H. Alison. The club has a strict policy forbidding women to enter the club, except under rare circumstances.

== Location and founding ==
The Burning Tree Club was founded in 1922, supposedly in response to a male foursome from the Chevy Chase Club being stuck behind a slow-playing group of female golfers. The name of Burning Tree Club was named for the colorful leaves of a particularly large oak tree in the autumn on its grounds.

The club is located in Bethesda, Maryland, near Congressional Country Club, home of the 2011 U.S. Open golf tournament.

== Fees ==
The initiation fee is $75,000, while membership fees are $500/month. Membership is exclusive with a cap around 600. The member list is private, and includes honoraria and retired golfers and can be achieved by invitation only.

== Notable members and former members ==
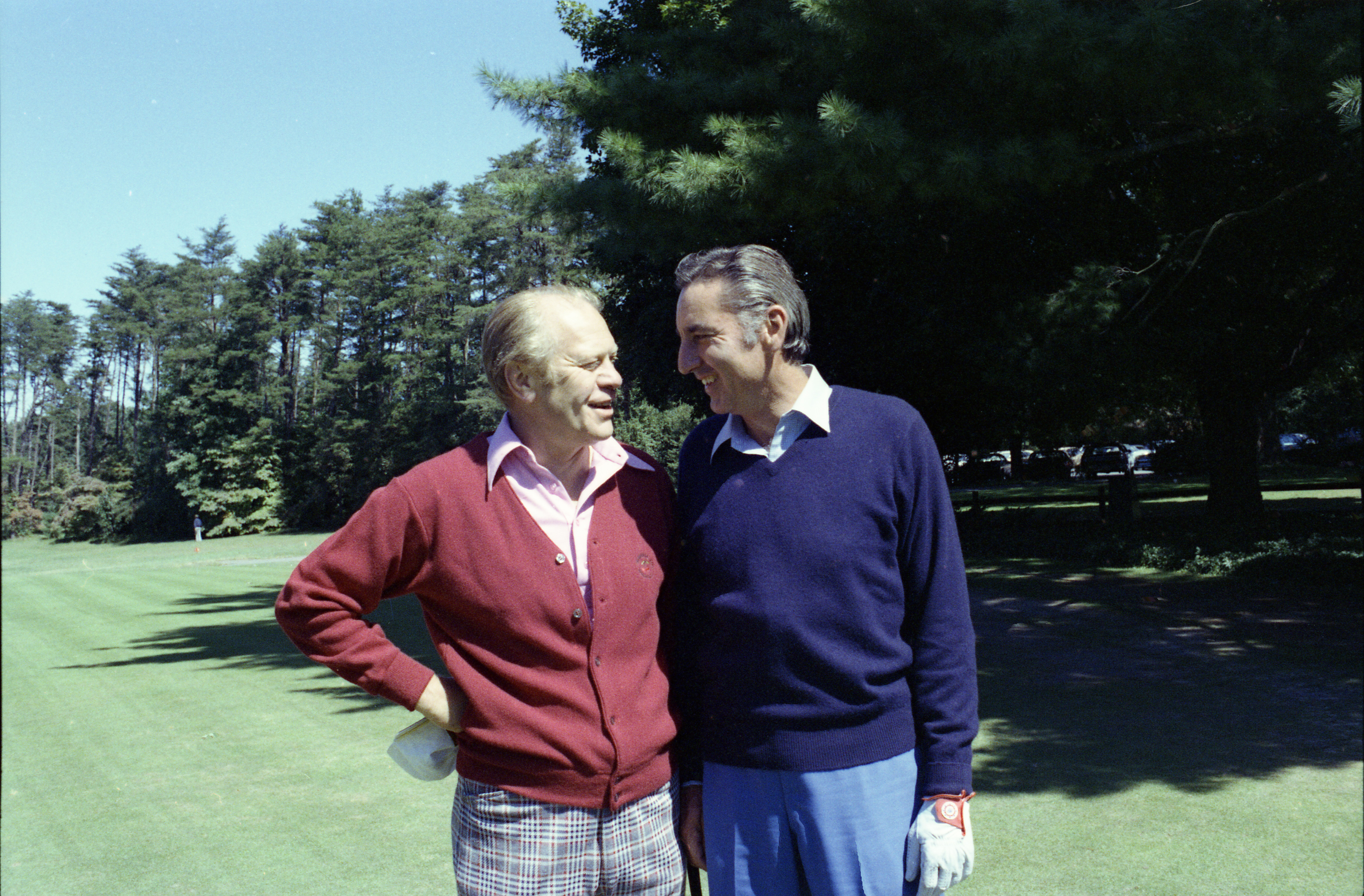
U.S. President Gerald Ford plays at Burning Tree with Francis "Pug" Lund in 1975.

Presidents including Franklin D. Roosevelt, Harry S. Truman, Dwight D. Eisenhower, John F. Kennedy, Lyndon Johnson, Richard Nixon, Gerald Ford, and George Herbert Walker Bush have been extended honorary membership.

Until the appointment of Sandra Day O'Connor to the Supreme Court of the United States, the club had always extended honorary memberships to the Court's Justices; those who accepted include Associate Justice Antonin Scalia and former Chief Justice Warren Burger.

Other notable members include:

- Former Speaker of the House John Boehner (R-OH)
- Former Speaker of the House Tip O'Neill (D-MA)
- William Randolph Hearst
- Former Senate Majority Leader Robert A. Taft (R-OH)
- Edward R. Murrow
- Former Senator John Warner (R-VA)
- Former Senator Don Nickles (R-OK)
- Bob Schieffer
- Jack Valenti
- George Smathers
- Bryant Gumbel
- Barry Goldwater
- Bret Baier

== Discrimination ==
There are no women's locker rooms or bathrooms at Burning Tree. No women are permitted inside the club at all, not even for service reasons or parties, with rare exceptions. A recent allowance was made for the spring cocktail party, and women are allowed into the pro shop in December to holiday shop for their husbands. They can do this only by appointment, during very restrictive hours, and only on Saturdays.

The exclusion of women has extended to Supreme Court Justices, as Sandra Day O'Connor was not invited to join. Even working female U.S. Secret Service agents have been turned away. Women U.S. Army EOD (explosive ordnance disposal) personnel have been turned away.

== Popular culture ==
In the Seinfeld episode "The Bottle Deposit", Elaine bids on a set of golf clubs supposedly used by President John F. Kennedy at Burning Tree Club on the morning of the Bay of Pigs Invasion.

In the 1994 book Watergate, author Fred Emery mentions Gordon Liddy tracking down U.S. Attorney General Richard Kleindienst the day after the Watergate break-in at a luncheon at the club after a round of eighteen holes and "violently gesturing" at him and soon going with him and Powell Moore of the Committee for the Re-Election of the President to a small room off the locker area where President Dwight D. Eisenhower was recalled to have played cards after a round on the Burning Tree course. In the book, after hearing that although John N. Mitchell did not ask directly, he personally requested that Kleindienst as Attorney General arrange for Watergate burgular James W. McCord, Jr. to be released before his true identity (as a former Central Intelligence Agency employee and security coordinator for CRP) was found out; Kleindienst, in a profanity-laced tirade, refused to do so, said that Mitchell "knows me well enough to call himself if he has anything more like that to say to me" for any such request, and that he couldn't and wouldn't do it.
