= Pappy Stokes =

American professional golf caddie

Willie "Pappy" Stokes
- Stokes in the caddieshack at the Augusta National Golf Club
- Born: Willie Lee Stokes; May 22, 1920; Augusta, Georgia
- Died: July 9, 2006 (aged 86); Augusta, Georgia
- Resting place: Southview Cemetery; 33.44560°N 81.99970°W
- Other names: Pappy
- Occupation: Professional golf caddie
- Employer: Augusta National Golf Club
- Organization: Professional Caddies Association (PCA)
- Known for: • Youngest caddie with a Masters win (1938 at age 17) • Record holder at Augusta National as caddie with five Masters wins with four different champions • 2006 Caddie Hall of Fame inductee

Willie Lee "Pappy" Stokes (May 22, 1920 – July 9, 2006) was a professional golf caddie at the Augusta National Golf Club best known for his record of five Masters wins with four different champions and his induction into the Caddie Hall of Fame. Stokes, known as "Pappy" on the greens, was often called "the grandfather of caddies" at the Augusta National.

== Early life and career ==
Willie Stokes was born May 22, 1920 at his home on the former grounds of the Fruitlands Nurseries, an Indigofera plant farm where his father had worked. He and his family still lived there when the tract, 365 acres (148 ha), was purchased by Bobby Jones and Clifford Roberts to become the Augusta National Golf Club. In an interview with The Augusta Chronicle, Stokes said he had "helped clear trees for the routing of Augusta National":

I was born and raised there. It was a farm when I was young. I went out there every morning and I'd plow for cotton and corn. When they started building the course, I remember cutting down trees on No. 10 and No. 11.

After helping build the course, Stokes stayed on as a caddie for the rest of his working life. The only years that Stokes was absent during that span were 1943–1946, when he served in the US military.

Willie Stokes was the youngest caddie to ever be "on the bag" for a win at the Masters—at age 17 during the 1938 tournament with Henry Picard. Stokes went on to win four more times in 1948 with Claude Harmon, 1951 and 1953 with Ben Hogan, and 1956 with Jack Burke Jr., for a record number of five wins with four different champions which still stands at the Augusta National as of April 2026.

== Reflections of Jack Burke Jr. ==
Jack Burke Jr. said he was never comfortable taking advice from a caddie and that he always gave them the same instructions before the start of a tournament: "If you will stand two club lengths from my ball at all times, and don't step onto the putting green once, you will get a very nice tip when we're finished." Burke said he only broke this policy one time in his professional career—during the 1956 Masters Tournament when assessing a four-foot putt on the 18th hole.

I surveyed the putt and didn't like what I saw one bit. It was downhill, left to right and fast as the devil. This putt was so frightening, the consequences of missing it so great, I felt like I was going to pass out. That's when I called Pappy over.Jack Burke Jr.

Burke said that Pappy was "one of the great Augusta National caddies" and that he knew all of the dips and swales on the course. Burke went on to say that he never relied on Stokes but that he needed him at that time. Burke said he whispered to Stokes: "It's inside the left edge, right?", and that he remembered Stokes words, and his soothing voice—"It sure is, pro. Just go on and cruise her on in there." Burke made the putt and subsequently won the tournament that year.

== Death and legacy ==
Willie Stokes died on July 9, 2006, at the Georgia War Veterans Nursing Home. He was inducted into the Caddie Hall of Fame on January 26, 2007 as a 2006 inductee. Carl Jackson, who had the record number of Masters Tournament's "on the bag" (50 tournaments before 2013) said Willie Stokes was his mentor, saying of Stokes: "Pappy was the very best caddie here", calling him the "king". Freddie Bennett, former Caddie Master at Augusta National and 2000 Caddie Hall of Fame inductee called Stokes one of the all time "greatest caddies" placing Stokes at the top of his list of the 10 best.

== See also ==
- Nathaniel "Iron Man" Avery
