= Augusta National Golf Club =

Golf course in Georgia, United States

- Location within the United States Location within Georgia
- 33°30′09″N 82°01′12″W

Club information
- Location: Augusta, Georgia, U.S.
- Elevation: 160–310 ft (50–95 m)
- Established: 1933; 93 years ago
- Type: Private
- Owner: Augusta National Inc.
- Total holes: 27 (18-hole championship course; 9-hole Par 3 Course)
- Tournaments: Masters Tournament (1934–present); PGA Seniors' Championship (1937–38); Augusta National Women's Amateur (2019–present)
- Greens: Bentgrass
- Fairways: Ryegrass
- Website: masters.com
- Designed by: Bobby Jones and Alister MacKenzie
- Par: 72
- Length: 7,510 yards (6,870 m)
- Course rating: 78.1 (unofficial)
- Slope rating: 137 (unofficial)
- Course record: 63 – Nick Price (1986), Greg Norman (1996)
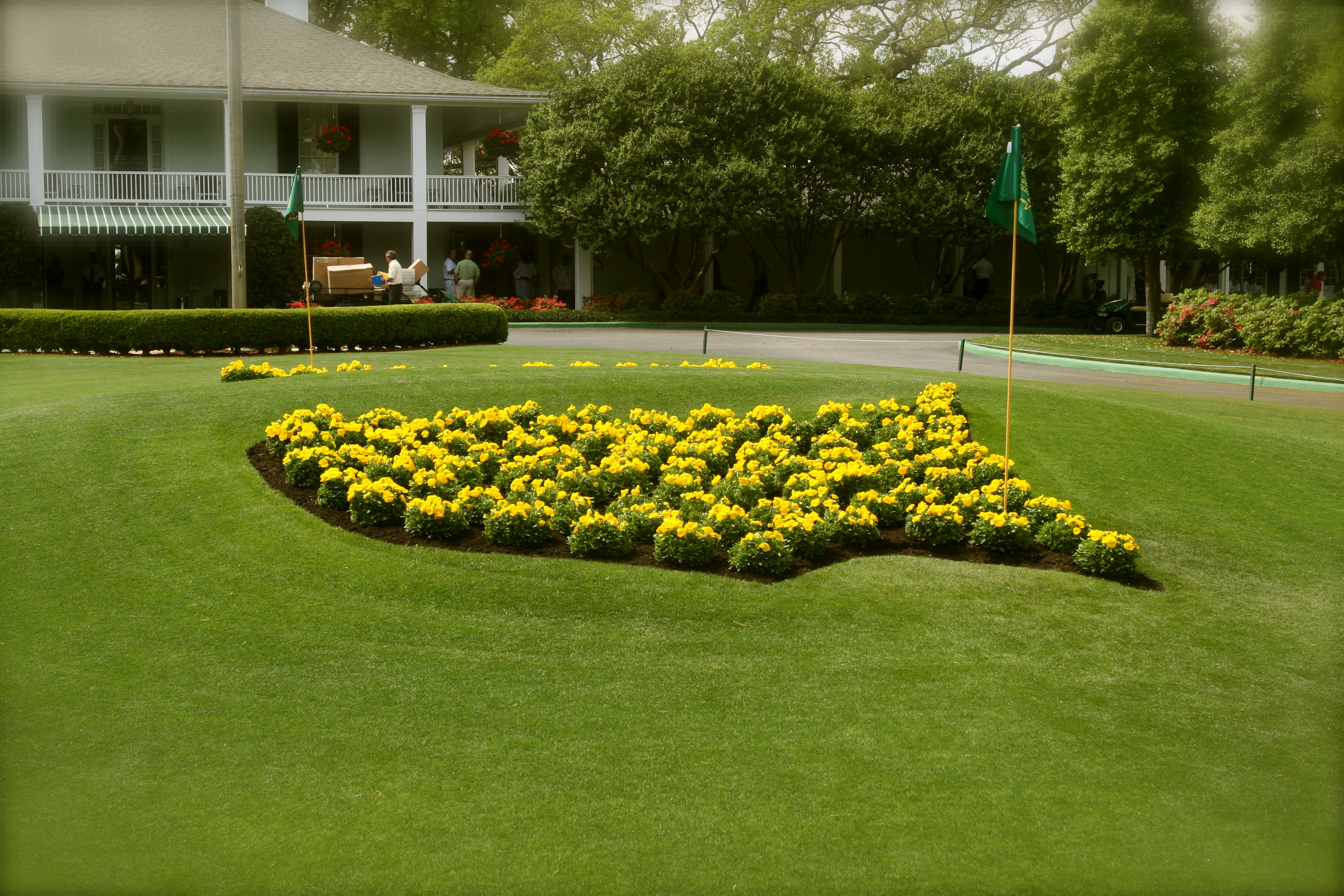
- The clubhouse and The Masters logo in 2007.

Augusta National Golf Club (ANGC; also Augusta National, Augusta, or the National) is a golf club in Augusta, Georgia, United States. It is known for hosting the annual Masters Tournament.

Founded by Bobby Jones and Clifford Roberts, the course was designed by Jones and Alister MacKenzie and opened for play in 1932. Unlike most private clubs which operate as non-profits, Augusta National is a for-profit corporation, and it does not disclose its income, holdings, membership list, or ticket sales. It is a winter club and is closed every summer from late May through mid-October.

Since 1934, the club has played host to the Masters Tournament, one of the four men's major championships in professional golf, and the only major played each year at the same course. It was the top-ranked course in Golf Digest's 2009 list of America's 100 greatest courses and was the number ten-ranked course based on course architecture on Golfweek Magazine's 2011 list of best classic courses in the United States.

In 2019, the course began co-hosting the Augusta National Women's Amateur with Champions Retreat Golf Club.

Fred Ridley has been Augusta National's chairman since October 16, 2017.

== History ==
=== Early planning ===
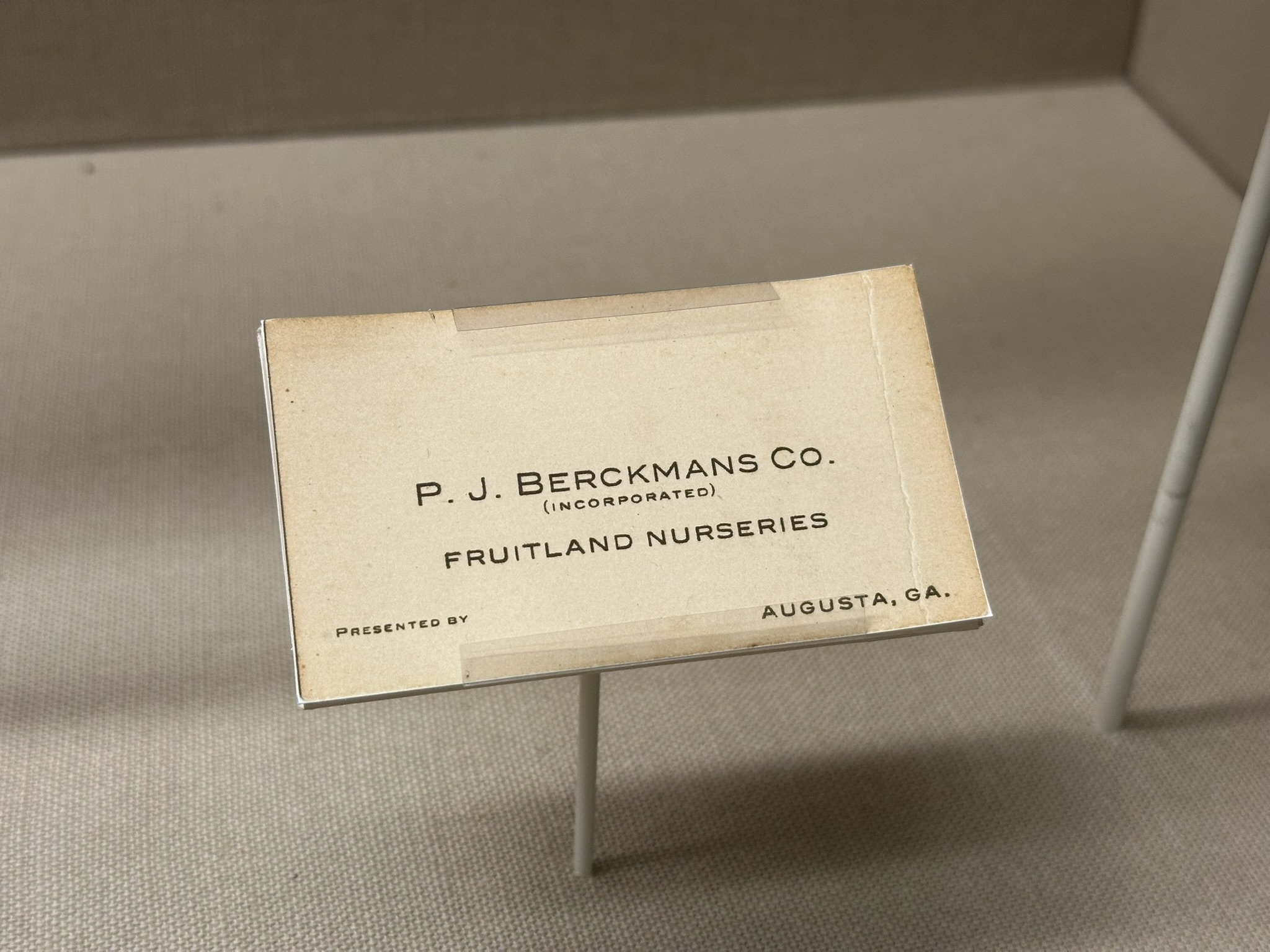
A business card from Fruitlands Nurseries, which previously occupied the land ANGC is built on

Augusta National (originally, during planning stages, Augusta-National) was founded in 1932 by Bobby Jones and Clifford Roberts on the 365-acre (148 ha) site of a former nursery and antebellum plantation called Fruitland (later Fruitlands). Jones sought to create a world-class winter golf course in his native state of Georgia. During the first decade of the club's existence, membership was low and finances were short due to the Great Depression and the relatively remote location of Augusta, forcing the duo to scrap future plans for a "ladies' course", squash and tennis courts, and various estates. Roberts later said that had they known how long the Depression would last, they would not have proceeded.

Other names considered for the club were American-International Golf Club, Georgia-National Golf Club (the early leading choice), the International Golf Club of Augusta, and Southern National Golf Club.

Construction of the golf course, designed by Alister MacKenzie, began in February 1932 and was finished quickly: Bermuda grass was planted in late May and mowed for the first time on June 10. Jones played the course in August and was happy with the quality. Moreover, construction had come in at its planned $100,000 budget. MacKenzie was assisted by Marion Hollins.

The club also hired Olmsted Brothers to design a new, future clubhouse and a planned subdivision, initially envisioned to comprise a third of the land and from which lots would be sold to members for winter homes. Numbered lots were advertised along the street and access roads were built. (The firm also advised against the course's now-famous plant-themed holes.) Twenty sites were planned, with acreage reserved for more; however, only three lots were sold to a single club member, W. Montgomery Harison, upon which Harison built a large mansion. (The parcel was eventually purchased by Augusta member Julian Roberts and sold back to the club; the house was torn down.)

Roberts attempted to attract members by sending out thousands of invitation letters with a note from Jones. The Augusta Chronicle published an editorial praising the new club. After a year, just 66 members had joined. Others withdrew later due to financial difficulties. A large percentage of new members were New Yorkers, attracted by either Jones or Grantland Rice, who often promoted Augusta National in his column "The Sportlight". Even after Roberts and Jones created a cheaper membership option, new applicants were few and far between. MacKenzie, too, was owed at least $3,000 at the end of 1932, but the club had no extra money; he ultimately died before ever seeing the completed course.

An official opening took place in January 1933. Roberts and Rice arranged for a private train car to come to Augusta from New York City and play golf with Jones and Francis Ouimet. The weekend was ruined by cold, rainy weather and only one guest joined the club, Frank Willard, as a favor to Roberts. That March, the club reported a debt of $31,000.

=== First Masters tournaments ===
The Masters was first held in 1934 in an attempt to attract crowds and players. Roberts persuaded Jones, then retired, to return to play in the tournament. Jones was initially against the name Masters. At that point in time, Augusta National had just 76 members (instead of a planned 1,800, including many international members), paying annual dues of $60/year.

The Georgia Railroad and Banking Company, Augusta's main creditor, forced a foreclosure of the club and re-incorporation as Augusta National, Inc. in 1935. The bank realized its best chance of recouping its debt was to ensure the club stayed afloat through the depression.

Olmsted Brothers's work was advertised during the first two Masters Tournaments, and they were billed as one of "three eminent designers" of the course, alongside Jones and MacKenzie. It worked with Augusta National on their unsuccessful subdivision project for a decade.

Roberts also envisioned an on-site golf hall of fame, inspired by the then-two-year-old National Baseball Hall of Fame and Museum; the idea never progressed. In 1939, he sent all Augusta National members a letter imploring them to invite new people to join the club, resulting in membership breaking 100 people for the first time. The Masters, too, was finally operating on a profit. Around this time, club members led by Bartlett Arkell donated $50,000 for the clubhouse to be renovated.

=== World War II ===
When World War II broke out, the club at first tried to carry on as normal. In 1942, the club built a putting green and practice range at Camp Gordon for soldiers in training, and some competitors in the 1942 Masters Tournament held an exhibition at the base as well. Augusta National closed on October 1, 1942 as the country took a total war posture. Many club members assumed ANGC would never re-open.

To assist the war effort, cattle and turkeys were raised on the Augusta National grounds. The club also gifted a turkey to each of its members for Christmas in 1943. The turkeys turned a profit, but the cattle resulted in a net loss for the club, and left the course damaged. (Local boys would swim in Rae's Creek and chase the cows across the property.) In 1944, German prisoners of war held at Camp Gordon were forced to restore the grounds, and they also built a wooden bridge over Rae's Creek that stood until the mid-1950s.

=== Post-war growth and Eisenhower ===
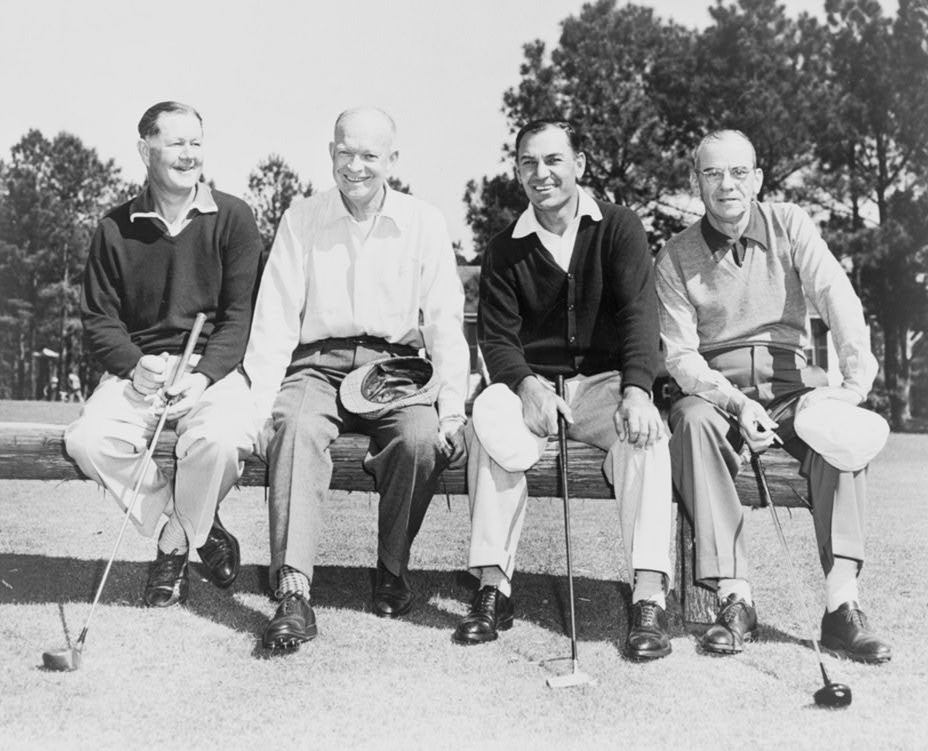
Byron Nelson, Dwight D. Eisenhower, Ben Hogan, and Clifford Roberts (left to right)

After World War II, club member Edward J. Barber lent Augusta $100,000 and informed Roberts he would leave the club money in his will. More people joined following the end of the war, and ANGC reached 130 members. This influx of money allowed the club to build residential suites, a pro shop, a dining room, and other amenities. Magnolia Lane was paved in 1947.

Another more modest subdivision called De Soto Trail was planned on the land that now is the Par 3 Course in the late 1940s. ANGC offered the land for sale to local real estate companies; none placed a bid. Local developers during the early 1950s would still not return calls from Roberts.

Its first club professional was Ed Dudley, who served in the role until 1957; Dudley was one of the top tournament professionals of his era, with 15 wins on the PGA Tour.

In 1948, Dwight D. Eisenhower and his wife Mamie were personally invited to Augusta by Roberts. Eisenhower took a liking to the club, becoming a member, and hired Roberts as his executor and financial advisor; Roberts had a house (Eisenhower Cabin) constructed for Eisenhower on the grounds. During his presidency, Eisenhower visited Augusta National 29 times.

In 1953, Augusta constructed a fence around the property, largely to ensure the safety of Eisenhower.

A new par-3 course designed by George Cobb and Roberts and was built in 1958, and the annual Par 3 Contest was first held in 1960.

==== Augusta National, Inc. v. Northwestern Mut. Life Ins. Co. (1976) ====
The Moss Creek Women's Invitational was first announced in 1976 as the "Ladies Masters". After ANGC complained, the LPGA changed the name to the "Women's International", but tournament sponsor Northwestern Mutual continued to pursue the name. Northwestern asked Augusta whether it could license the name Masters, offered its own compromise title (the "Moss Creek Ladies Masters"), and briefly attempted to trademark the term Ladies Masters. LPGA commissioner Ray Volpe called Augusta's objection "ridiculous" and said they would "never give up the Masters name now. It isn't copyrighted, trademarked, or registered." The court ruled in favor of Augusta National, finding that the usage of the term Masters diluted Augusta's trademark.

=== Late 20th century ===
In the fall of 1990, during Tropical Storm Marco, Amen Corner was damaged, especially hole 11 (White Dogwood), which "floated off the golf course" after Rae's Creek overflowed. Also damaged were the Ben Hogan and Byron Nelson Bridges, a retention dam, the scoreboard on the left side of White Dogwood, and a city sewer line. Augusta National rebuilt the greens based on a 1982 survey and photographs, re-paving an abandoned maintenance road to reach the affected area. The repaired holes re-opened to club members in November 1990; the course was fully restored for the 1991 Masters Tournament.

During early planning stages for the 1996 Atlanta Summer Olympic Games in 1992, Billy Payne (who would become ANGC chairman 15 years later) and the ACOG wanted a golf event to be held at Augusta. The club, under chairman Jackson T. Stephens, agreed, as did IOC president Juan Antonio Samaranch, and an announcement was held at the club in October 1992. However, IOC board member Anita DeFrantz, a Black woman, objected to the idea due to Augusta National's ban on women members and its single Black member. The Atlanta City Council also was opposed. Payne announced the plan would not proceed in January 1993.

==== Controversies in the 1990s and 2000s ====
The club's strict rules and membership policy have long attracted criticism. On the first episode of HBO's Real Sports in 1995, Frank Deford called ANGC "the last dictatorship in sport" and "the American Singapore".

Augusta invited and accepted its first Black member, television executive Ron Townsend, in 1990 after Shoal Creek Golf and Country Club, an all-white golf club in Alabama, refused membership to African-Americans.

==== Martha Burk ====
Augusta National and its then-chairman Hootie Johnson are widely known for their disagreement, beginning in 2002, with Martha Burk, then chair of the Washington-based National Council of Women's Organizations; the dispute arose over Augusta National's refusal to admit female members to the club. Burk said she found out about the club's policies in a USA Today column published April 11, 2002. She then wrote a private letter to Johnson, saying that hosting the Masters Tournament at a male-only club constituted sexism. Johnson characterized Burk's approach as "offensive and coercive". The club hired a consulting firm, which ran a survey and found that "Augusta National's membership policies were not topmost on the list of women's concerns"; the poll was called "unethical" by Burk. Responding to efforts to link the issue to sexism and civil rights, Johnson maintained that the issue had to do with the rights of any private club:

Our membership is single gender just as many other organizations and clubs all across America. These would include Junior Leagues, sororities, fraternities, Boy Scouts, Girl Scouts, and countless others. And we all have a moral and legal right to organize our clubs the way we wish.

Burk, whose childhood nickname was also Hootie, claimed to have been "called a man hater, anti-family, lesbian, all the usual things." Johnson was portrayed as a Senator Claghorn type—"a blustery defender of all things Southern".

Following the discord, two club members resigned: Thomas H. Wyman, a former CEO of CBS, and John Snow, when President George W. Bush nominated him to serve as Secretary of the Treasury. Pressure on corporate sponsors led the club to broadcast the 2003 and 2004 tournaments without commercials. The controversy was discussed by the International Olympic Committee when re-examining whether golf meets Olympic criteria of a "sport practiced without discrimination with a spirit of friendship, solidarity and fair play". Augusta National extended membership to Condoleezza Rice and Darla Moore on August 20, 2012.

=== 21st century ===
==== Expansion ====
A new two-story press building opened for the 2017 tournament in the northwest corner of the property, featuring a restaurant called Bartlett Lounge. The new building replaced an old press center near the first tee that had been in use since 1990; that space was repurposed with an expanded concessions area. The next year, in 2018, Augusta National doubled the size of its Masters Golf Shop.

==== Youth and women's initiatives ====
Augusta National partnered with the USGA and the PGA of America to establish Drive, Chip and Putt (DCP), a youth golf skills competition which was first held in 2014.

In 2018, chairman Fred Ridley announced that the club would establish, together with Champions Retreat Golf Club, the Augusta National Women's Amateur (ANWA) in 2019, a 54-hole event for the world's top ranked amateur players.

==== The Patch ====
ANGC, together with First Tee and Augusta Technical College, renovated Augusta Municipal Golf Course (known as "The Patch") in the early 2020s. The course, re-designed by Tom Fazio and Beau Welling, also includes a new 9-hole course called The Loop, designed by Tiger Woods.

== Course ==
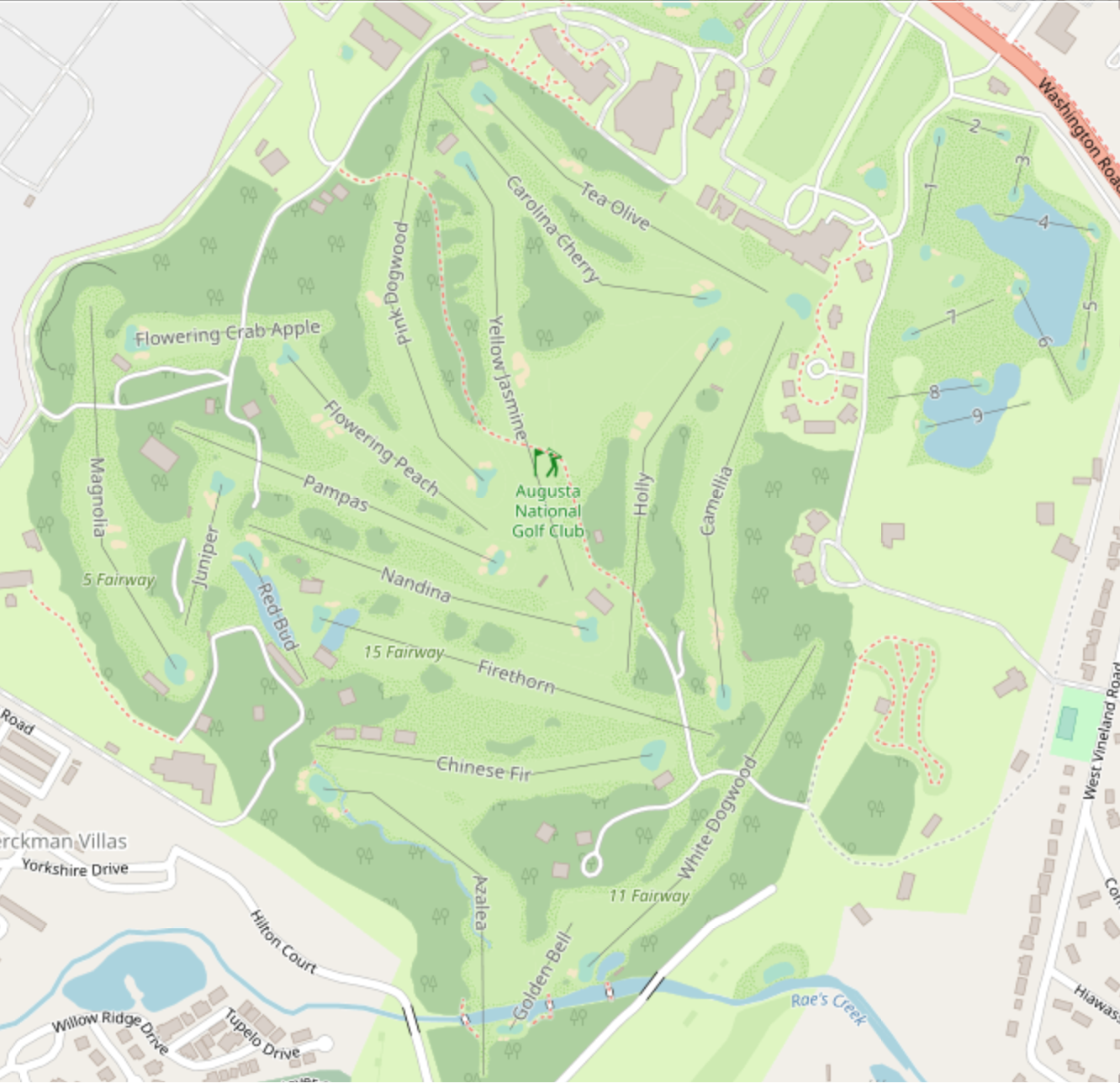
Layout of Augusta National Golf Club

The course was formerly a plant nursery, and each hole on the course is named after the tree or shrub with which it has become associated. Several of the holes on the first nine have been renamed, as well as hole #11.

Hole 1, Tea Olive, was called Cherokee Rose at first, and no. 2, Pink Dogwood, was Woodbine. The fourth hole, Flowering Peach, was once known as Palm, and hole 7, Pampas, was called Cedar. Hole 11, White Dogwood, first was simply called Dogwood; hole 12, Golden Bell, was called Three Pines before its eponymous three pine trees died; and Hole 14, Chinese Fir, was originally called Spanish Dagger.

A 90-yard 19th hole was originally planned, but never built.

Hole	Name	Yards	Par	Hole	Name	Yards	Par
1	Tea Olive	445	4	10	Camellia	495	4
2	Pink Dogwood	585	5	11	White Dogwood	520	4
3	Flowering Peach	350	4	12	Golden Bell	155	3
4	Flowering Crab Apple	240	3	13	Azalea	545	5
5	Magnolia	495	4	14	Chinese Fir	440	4
6	Juniper	180	3	15	Firethorn	550	5
7	Pampas	450	4	16	Redbud	170	3
8	Yellow Jasmine	570	5	17	Nandina	450	4
9	Carolina Cherry	460	4	18	Holly	465	4
Front		3,775	36	Back		3,780	36
Source:				Total		7,555	72

Augusta National
Tee	Rating/Slope	1	2	3	4	5	6	7	8	9	Out	10	11	12	13	14	15	16	17	18	In	Total
Par		4	5	4	3	4	3	4	5	4	36	4	4	3	5	4	5	3	4	4	36	72
Masters	N/A	445	585	350	240	495	180	450	570	460	3,775	495	520	155	545	440	550	170	440	465	3,780	7,555
Member	N/A	365	515	340	170	400	165	330	480	395	3,160	450	400	145	455	380	475	145	370	385	3,205	6,365
SI		9	1	13	15	5	17	11	3	7		6	8	16	4	12	2	18	14	10

Lengths of the course for the Masters at the start of each decade:

- 2020: 7,475 yards (6,835 m)
- 2010: 7,435 yards (6,799 m)
- 2000: 6,985 yards (6,387 m)
- 1990: 6,905 yards (6,314 m)
- 1980: 7,040 yards (6,437 m)
- 1970: 6,980 yards (6,383 m)
- 1960: 6,980 yards (6,383 m)
- 1950: 6,900 yards (6,309 m)
- 1940: 6,800 yards (6,218 m)

Unlike most other private or public golf courses in the United States, Augusta National has never been rated. During the 1990 Masters Tournament, a team of USGA raters, organized by Golf Digest, evaluated the course and gave it an unofficial rating of 76.2. It was re-evaluated in 2009 and given an unofficial rating of 78.1.

Rather than more prominent tee markers, ANGC uses cut hickory logs.

The course's greens are meticulously maintained to provide a fast and hard golfing surface. This firmness is assisted by an underground irrigation and ventilation system known as the SubAir System, developed and installed in 1994 by course superintendent Marsh Benson. SubAir soon evolved into its own company in nearby Graniteville, South Carolina, designing and installing similar automatic water suction systems in venues such as Pebble Beach, East Lake, Citi Field, and Citizens Bank Park.

The bunkers are filled not with traditional sand but with granulated quartz (known as "Spruce Pine sand" and SP55) which is produced as a byproduct during work at feldspar mines in the Spruce Pine Mining District in and around Spruce Pine, North Carolina. Augusta has been using Spruce Pine sand to fill its bunkers since the early 1970s, when Clifford Roberts visited Linville Golf Club in Linville, North Carolina, which used the material. Since the mining company providing the sand refused payment, in exchange Roberts offered to host the company owner at Augusta at any time, and later gifted him six Masters passes.

The golf course architecture website GolfClubAtlas.com has said, "Augusta National has gone through more changes since its inception than any of the world's twenty or so greatest courses. To call it a MacKenzie course is false advertising as his features are essentially long gone and his routing is all that is left." The authors of the site also add that MacKenzie and Jones were heavily influenced by the Old Course at St Andrews, and intended that the ground game be central to the course. Almost from Augusta's opening, Roberts sought to make changes to minimize the ground game, and effectively got free rein to do so because MacKenzie died shortly after the course's opening and Jones went into inactivity due to World War II and then a crippling illness. The authors add that "[w]ith the ground game gone, the course was especially vulnerable to changes in technology, and this brought on a slew of changes from at least 15 different 'architects'." Golf Course Histories has an aerial comparison of the course's architectural changes between 1938 and 2013.

Among the changes to the course were several made by architect Perry Maxwell in 1937, including an alteration involving the current 10th hole. When Augusta National originally opened for play in January 1933, the opening hole (now the 10th) was a relatively benign par 4 that played just in excess of 400 yards. From an elevated tee, the hole required little more than a short iron or wedge for the approach. Maxwell moved the green in 1937 to its present location—on top of the hill, about 50 yards back from the old site—and transformed it into the toughest hole in Masters Tournament history. Ben Crenshaw referred to Maxwell's work on the 10th hole as "one of the great strokes in golf architecture".

For the 1999 tournament, a short rough was instated around the fairways. Referred to as the "second cut", it is substantially shorter than the comparable primary rough at other courses, with an average length of 1.625 in (4.13 cm). It is meant to reduce a player's ability to control the ball coming out of this lie, and encourage better accuracy for driving onto the fairway.

=== Amen Corner ===
The second shot at the 11th, all of the 12th, and the first two shots at the 13th hole at Augusta are nicknamed "Amen Corner". This term was first used in print by author Herbert Warren Wind in his April 21, 1958 Sports Illustrated article about the Masters that year. In a Golf Digest article in April 1984, 26 years later, Wind told about its origin. He said he wanted a catchy phrase like baseball's "hot-corner" or American football's "coffin-corner" to explain where some of the most exciting golf had taken place (the Palmer-Venturi rules issue at twelve, over an embedded ball ruling and how it was handled, in particular). Thus "Amen Corner" was born. He said it came from the title of a jazz record he had heard in the mid-1930s by a group led by Chicago's Mezz Mezzrow, Shouting in that Amen Corner.

In a Golf Digest article in April 2008, writer Bill Fields offered new information about the origin of the name. He wrote that Richard Moore, a golf and jazz historian from South Carolina, tried to purchase a copy of the old Mezzrow 78 RPM disc for an "Amen Corner" exhibit he was putting together for his Golf Museum at Ahmic Lake, Ontario. After extensive research, Moore found that the record never existed. As Moore put it, Wind, himself a jazz buff, must have "unfortunately bogeyed his mind, 26 years later". While at Yale, he was no doubt familiar with, and meant all along, the popular version of the song (with the correct title, "Shoutin' in that Amen Corner" written by Andy Razaf), which was recorded by the Dorsey Brothers Orchestra, vocal by Mildred Bailey (Brunswick label No. 6655) in 1935. Moore told Fields that, being a great admirer of Wind's work over the years, he was reluctant, for months, to come forth with his discovery that contradicted Wind's memory. Moore's discovery was first reported in Golf World magazine in 2007, before Fields' longer article in Golf Digest in 2008.

In 1958, Arnold Palmer outlasted Ken Venturi to win the tournament with heroic escapes at Amen Corner. Amen Corner also played host to Masters moments such as Byron Nelson's birdie-eagle at 12 and 13 in 1937, and Sam Snead's water save at 12 in 1949 that sparked him to victory. On the less positive side, Jordan Spieth's quadruple bogey on 12 during Sunday's final round in 2016 cost him his 2-stroke lead and ultimately the championship.

=== "The Big Oak Tree" ===
"The Big Oak Tree" is on the golf course side of the clubhouse and was planted in the 1850s.

=== Eisenhower Tree ===
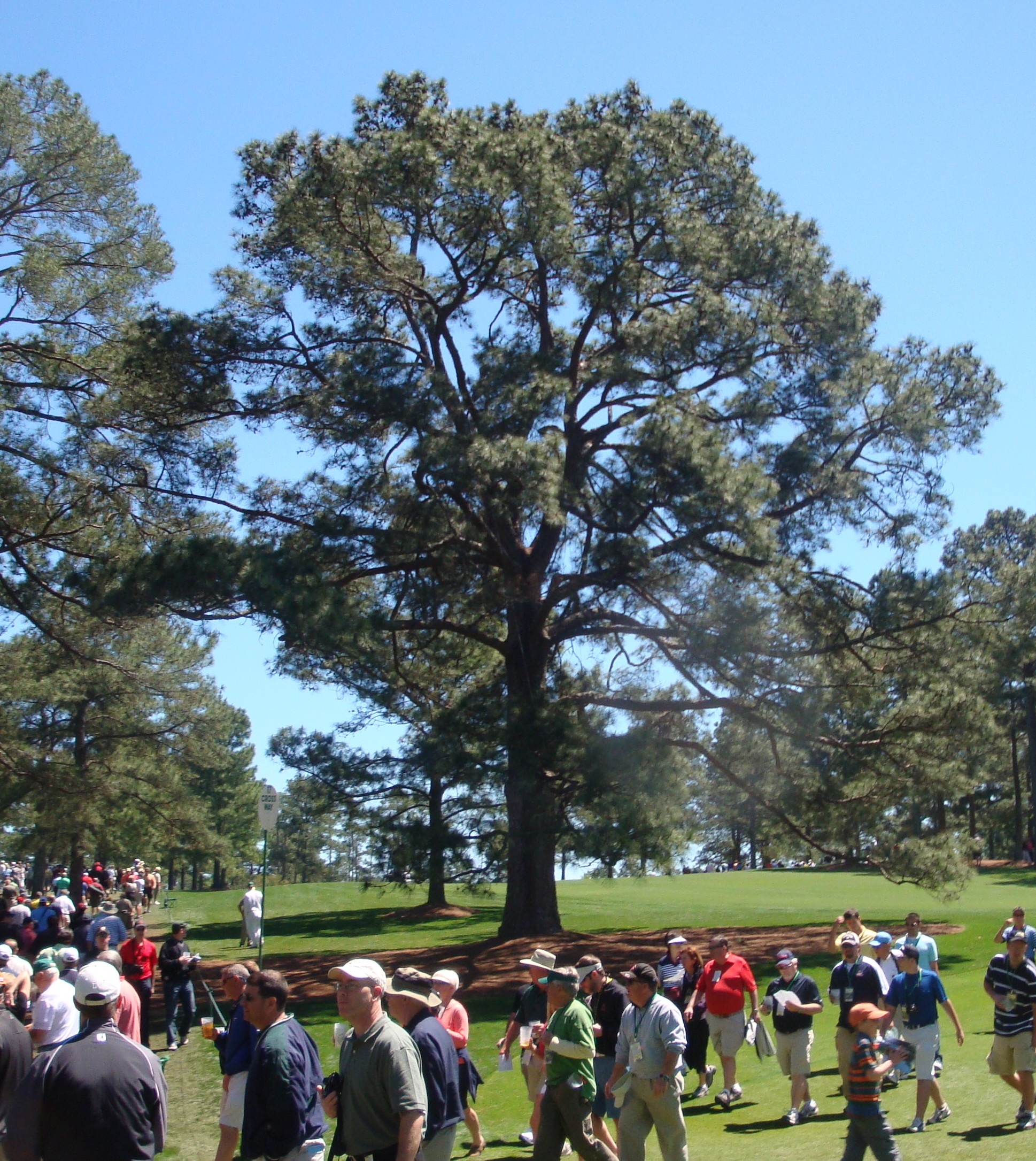
Eisenhower Tree in 2011

Also known as the "Eisenhower Pine", a loblolly pine was located on the 17th hole, about 210 yards (190 m) from the Masters tee. President Dwight D. Eisenhower, an Augusta National member, hit the tree so many times that, at a 1956 club meeting, he proposed that it be cut down. Not wanting to offend the president, the club's chairman, Clifford Roberts, immediately adjourned the meeting rather than reject the request. In February 2014, the Eisenhower Tree was removed after suffering extensive damage during an ice storm.

=== Ike's Pond ===
During a visit to Augusta National, then-General Eisenhower returned from a walk through the woods on the eastern part of the grounds and informed Clifford Roberts that he had found a perfect place to build a dam if the club would like a fish pond. Ike's Pond was built for Eisenhower to fish in and named after him; the dam is located just where Eisenhower said it should be.

Roberts died of suicide next to Ike's Pond on September 29, 1977.

=== Rae's Creek ===
Rae's Creek cuts across the southeastern corner of the Augusta National property. Rae's Creek runs in front of the No. 12 green, has a tributary evident at the No. 13 tee, and flows at the back of the No. 11 green. This is the lowest point in elevation of the course. The Hogan and Nelson Bridges cross the creek after the 12th and 13th tee boxes, respectively. The creek was named after former property owner John Rae, who died in 1789. It was Rae's house which was the farthest fortress up the Savannah River from Fort Augusta. The house kept residents safe during Indian attacks when the fort was out of reach.

=== Sarazen Bridge ===
The Sarazen Bridge was the first feature to be named for a player. It is a flat stone footbridge covering the dam to the left of the pond in front of the 15th green, the scene of Gene Sarazen's "shot heard round the world" in the 1935 Masters Tournament. There is a plaque on the bridge that reads

Erected to commemorate the twentieth anniversary of the famous "double eagle" scored by Gene Sarazen on this hole, April 7, 1935, which gained him a tie for first place with Craig Wood and in the play-off won the second Masters Tournament. Dedicated April 6, 1955.

== Facilities and grounds ==
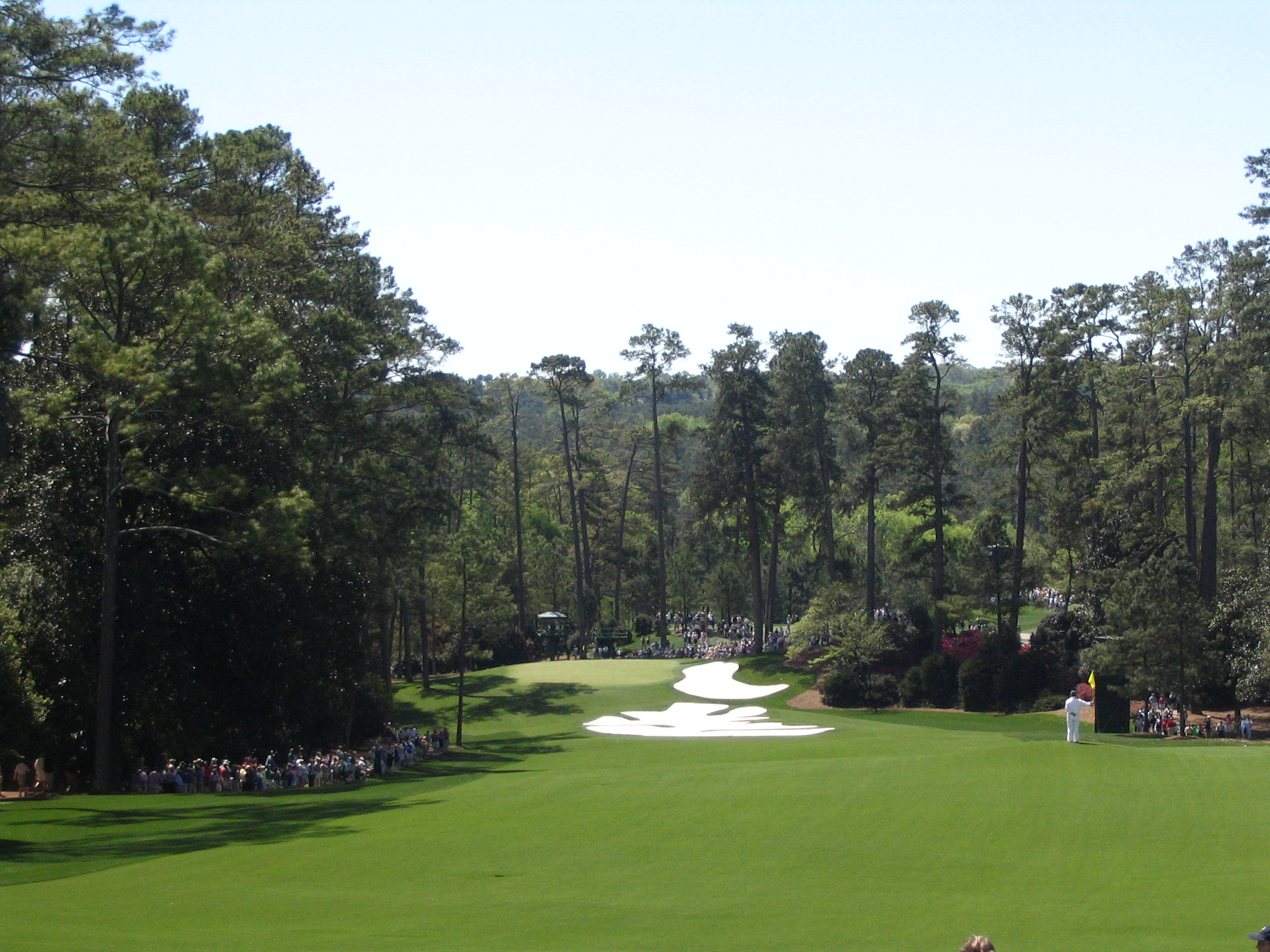
The 10th fairway and green in 2006

Augusta is renowned for its well-maintained impeccable appearance: pine needles are imported, bird sounds are played on inconspicuous speakers, and even the ponds were once dyed blue. The club is famed for its azaleas and dogwoods.

Rules and policies imposed on employees, club members, and visitors (referred to internally as "patrons") are notoriously strict. No cell phones or other electronic devices are permitted (except in the press building—spot checks are performed elsewhere); no running or loud talking is allowed; hats may not be worn backwards; and spectators are not allowed to cheer when a player makes a mistake. Security guards enforce these rules, and are traditionally provided by Pinkerton. Rule-breakers are permanently banned.

Other notable facilities include Butler Cabin, near hole 18, where tournament winners are presented with a green jacket; the clubhouse, near hole 1, which dates to the 1850s and has a well-stocked wine cellar; and a practice range.

The club's on-site press building has television studios, a complimentary restaurant and snack options, staffed bathrooms, and leather chairs. Cameras placed throughout the course are directly connected to the press building's studios via underground cables.

There are two members-only buildings located discreetly on the course: The Spring, between holes 4 and 5, and The Retreat, just above Amen Corner.

A network of tunnels underneath the property is large enough for semi-trucks to make deliveries.

=== Cabins ===
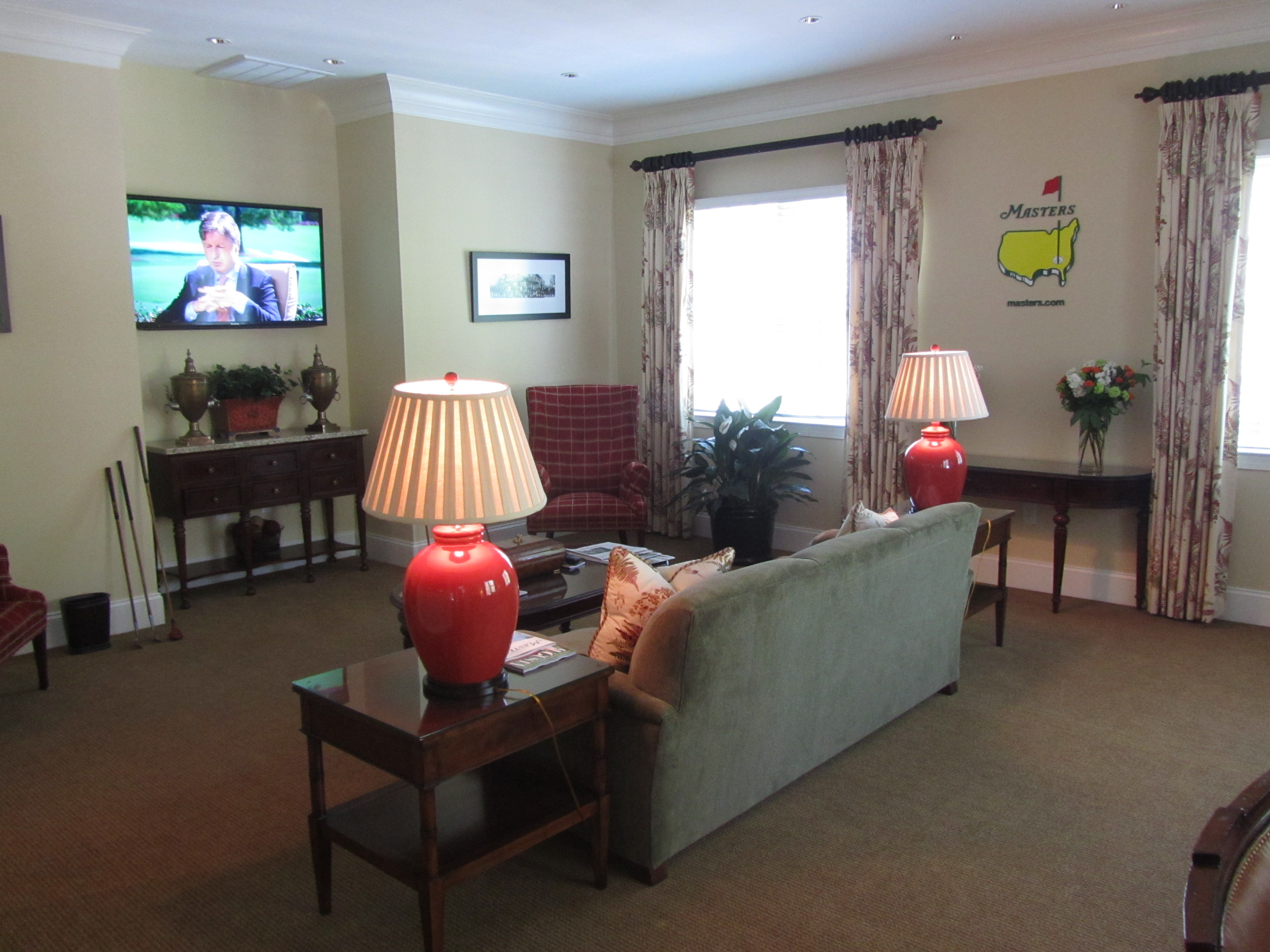
The interior of Dogwood Cabin in 2013

There are a total of 12 houses, called "cabins", on the property, including:

- Butler Cabin, well known as where tournament winners are presented with their green jacket
- Camellia Cabin
- Dogwood Cabin
- Eisenhower Cabin, or Ike's Cabin
- Firethorn Cabin
- Golden Bell Cabin
- Johnson-McColl Cabin, on the par 3 course
- Jones Cabin, near the tenth hole
- Payne Cabin, on the par 3 course
- Peek Cabin
- Roberts Cabin
- Stephens Cabin

Four of the cabins on the property are reserved for tournament sponsors during the Masters—as of 2026, Mercedes-Benz (Firethorn), IBM, AT&T (Golden Bell), and Bank of America.

=== Real estate ===
Over the decades, Augusta National has bought and redeveloped nearby land. From 1999 to 2019, the club spent about $200 million to buy 100 separate properties totaling over 270 acres (110 ha), some more than a mile away from the club proper. Most purchases are arranged via LLCs connected to Augusta National in order to obfuscate the transaction's details. More than a dozen of these LLCs are known to exist, and up to five may be involved in a single purchase. Augusta National ultimately purchases each LLC, acquiring its land holdings and keeping the real estate price away from public records. Non-disclosure agreements are also commonly employed.

Augusta National has acquired, demolished, and redeveloped entire strip mall centers and residential blocks. The organization helped finance a project to re-route Berckmans Road. The club also built a large tunnel underneath Washington Road connecting to a Global Communication Center that was first used in the 2021 Masters Tournament. The tunnel was built without ever impeding traffic on Washington Road above, and is large enough for an 18-wheeler to drive through.

Because Augusta National has spent so much to acquire land, homeowners in Richmond County have had to apply for special property tax assessments in order to negate the effects of the club's activities. Investors have also begun to purchase property and condos next to Augusta National.

== Membership and club activities ==
Augusta National Golf Club has about 300 members at any given time. Membership is strictly by invitation: there is no application process. In 2004, USA Today published a list of all the current members. Club members are sometimes referred to as "green jackets".

For decades, the club barred membership to African Americans. Co-founder Roberts, who subsequently served as the club's chairman, said, "As long as I'm alive, all the golfers will be white and all the caddies will be black."

Augusta invited and accepted its first African-American member, television executive Ron Townsend, in 1990 after Shoal Creek Golf and Country Club, an all-white golf club in Alabama, refused membership to African-Americans. The club also faced demands that the PGA Championship not be held there because of racist comments by the club's founder.

In his 2012 pre-Masters press conference, Chairman Billy Payne declined to discuss the club's refusal to admit women. He defended the club's position by noting that in 2011, more than 15% of the non-tournament rounds were played by women who were guests or spouses of active members. However, on August 20, 2012, Augusta National admitted its first two female members: Condoleezza Rice and Darla Moore.

Augusta National holds three large annual members-only events: an Opening Party in October, a Governors Party in November, and a Closing Party in the third week of May. Additionally, the club hosts a members-only golf tournament called the Jamboree in late March. Jamboree winners include Ed Dudley in 1950, and Fred Brand Jr. in 1982.

Additionally, Augusta is one of five golf clubs that participates in an annual rotating-venue members-only golf tournament known as SCAPS; the other clubs are Seminole Golf Club, Cypress Point Club, Pine Valley Golf Club, and San Francisco Golf Club.

=== Notable members ===
Notable current members include:

- William Acquavella, the head of Acquavella Galleries
- Samual Armacost, former president, director, and CEO of BankAmerica Corporation
- Ed Bastian, CEO of Delta Air Lines
- Riley P. Bechtel, former chairman of the Bechtel Corporation
- Ana Botín, Spanish banker and executive chairman of Santander Group
- Nicholas F. Brady, former 68th United States Secretary of the Treasury
- Warren Buffett, CEO of Berkshire Hathaway
- Kenneth Chenault, Former chairman and CEO of American Express
- Pete Coors, former chairman and CEO of Coors Brewing Company and Molson Coors Brewing Company
- John H. Dobbs, former president of Dobbs Equity Partners LLC
- William Stamps Farish III, former United States Ambassador to the United Kingdom
- Donald V. Fites, former chairman and CEO of Caterpillar, Inc.
- Joe T. Ford, former chief executive officer and co-founder of Alltel
- Scott T. Ford, former president and chief executive officer of Alltel
- Bill Gates, co-founder and chairman of Microsoft
- Christopher Galvin, former CEO of Motorola, Inc.
- Frederick Gluck, former Senior partner and director at McKinsey & Company
- Roger Goodell, commissioner of the National Football League
- Pat Haden, former NFL player and former athletic director at the University of Southern California
- Craig Heatley, co-founder of Sky
- Andy Jassy, CEO of Amazon
- Charles B. Johnson, former CEO of Franklin Templeton Investments
- Rob Manfred, Commissioner of Major League Baseball
- Eli Manning, former Giants quarterback
- Peyton Manning, former NFL player
- Hugh McColl, former CEO of Bank of America
- Sean McManus, chairman of CBS Sports
- Richard McGinn, former CEO of Lucent Technologies
- Darla Moore, South Carolina businesswoman
- Jack Nicklaus, Hall of Fame golfer, six-time Masters champion, and the only Masters champion who is currently a regular member of the club
- Sam Nunn, former United States Senator from Georgia
- Sam Palmisano, former CEO of IBM
- Roger Penske, owner of Team Penske, the Indianapolis Motor Speedway and IndyCar
- John S. Reed, former CEO of Citigroup
- Condoleezza Rice, former United States Secretary of State
- Fred Ridley, amateur golfer and lawyer
- Ginni Rometty, former chair, president, and CEO of IBM
- Arthur F. Ryan, CEO of Prudential Insurance
- Annika Sörenstam, Hall of Fame golfer
- Warren Stephens, 68th United States Ambassador to the United Kingdom
- Lynn Swann, former NFL player
- Rex Tillerson, former United States Secretary of State, former chairman and CEO of ExxonMobil
- Douglas A. Warner III, former CEO and Chair of J.P. Morgan
- Sanford I. Weill, former chief executive and chairman of Citigroup
- Toby S. Wilt, TSW Investments

Deceased members include:

- Frank Broyles, college football coach and athletic director at the University of Arkansas
- Dwight D. Eisenhower, thirty-fourth President of the United States
- Freeman Gosden, radio performer and comedian
- Lou Gerstner, former IBM executive
- Lou Holtz, former college football coach
- Arnold Palmer, World Golf Hall of Fame member and four-time Masters champion, was also a regular member of the club
- T. Boone Pickens, Jr., oil tycoon
- W. Thomas Rice, major general, railroad executive and co-founder of CSX
- James D. Robinson III, former CEO of American Express
- Charles H. Sabin, president of the Guaranty Trust Company of New York
- Jack Welch, CEO of General Electric
- Jock Whitney, ambassador and philanthropist who helped finance the film Gone with the Wind
- Robert W. Woodruff, president of The Coca-Cola Company and philanthropist

=== Chairmen ===
- Clifford Roberts (1931 – April 11, 1976)
- William H. Lane (April 11, 1976 – 1978; 1979–1980, on leave)
- Hord Hardin (1978–1980, acting; 1980–1991)
- Jackson T. Stephens (1991–1998)
- Hootie Johnson (1998 – October 16, 2006)
- Billy Payne (October 17, 2006 – October 15, 2017)
- Fred Ridley (October 16, 2017 – present)

Chairmen serve for an indefinite amount of time. The chairman is the only person officially authorized to publicly discuss the Masters.

In 1966, the governing board of Augusta National passed a resolution honoring founder Bobby Jones with the position of President in Perpetuity.

== Green jacket ==
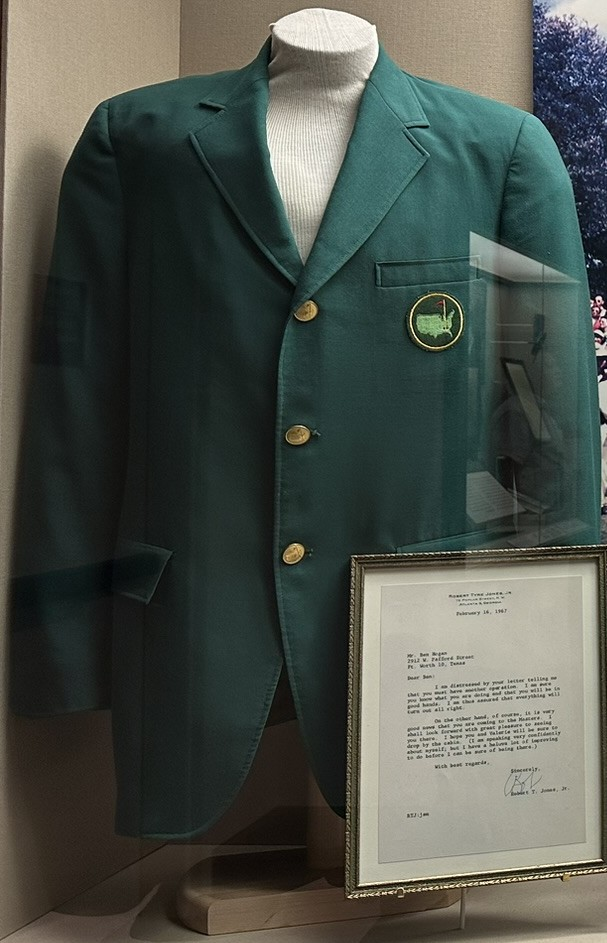
A c. 1990 green jacket on display at the Atlanta History Center

Every member of Augusta National is able to buy green sport coats with the club's logo on the left breast. The jackets are available in a range of fabrics at different tiers of pricing. Members are required to wear them during the Masters, and the jackets are not allowed to be removed from the grounds. The idea of the green jacket originated with club co-founder Clifford Roberts. Many believe it was because he wanted patrons visiting during the tournament to be able to readily identify members.

Until 1967, the jackets were manufactured by Brooks Brothers and since have been made most often by Hamilton Tailoring of Cincinnati, Ohio. Other known manufacturers include Hart Schaffner Marx, Georgia company Bobby Jones Apparel, and Henry Poole & Co of Savile Row. The imp wool is produced at the Victor Forstmann plant in Dublin, Georgia; the brass buttons are made by Waterbury Button Co. of Cheshire, Connecticut; and the breast-pocket patch is made by Weaverville, North Carolina-based A&B Emblem Co.

In 2012, two green jackets went missing, and Augusta National initially suspected and investigated jacket room manager Lawrence Bennett, an employee of over 40 years. Two other workers were eventually found to be responsible; Bennett was cleared, but never received an apology.

Underground beneath the club's pro shop, Augusta National in 2021 built a "Green Jacket Vault" and matching "Green Jacket Experience". Inside a fingerprint-secured area is a tailor's workshop for fitting new members with jackets, featuring hidden liquor cabinets, the club's oldest green jacket dating to the 1930s, and an array of samples to try on. Each jacket has a unique mark for identification.

Since Sam Snead's victory in 1949, the winner of each year's Masters Tournament has received a green jacket, although he does not receive membership. The jacket is presented to the new winner by the winner of the previous year's tournament. If the previous champion is either unavailable or has won consecutive tournaments, then the current chairman acts as the presenter.

The current Masters champion is the only owner of a green jacket permitted to remove it from the grounds of Augusta National, and only for a period of one year. Before this time limit was in place, the jacket of a few long-past Masters champions had been sold, after their deaths, to collectors. Consequently, the members of Augusta National have gone to great lengths to secure the remaining examples. Now, two jackets remain outside the grounds of Augusta National with the club's permission. When Gary Player first won the Masters in 1961, he brought his jacket home to South Africa. For years the board insisted that Player return the jacket but Player kept "forgetting" or coming up with humorous creative excuses why he did not return the jacket. After becoming something of a running joke, Augusta National's members allowed him to keep it, where it is on display in his personal museum. The second jacket belongs to 1938 champion Henry Picard. Before the traditions were well established, the jacket was removed by Picard from Augusta National. It is now currently on display in the "Picard Lounge" at Canterbury Golf Club in Beachwood, Ohio. Along with Snead, the nine previous winners were also awarded green jackets in 1949, and these became known as the "original ten" jackets.

Old, unneeded, missized, and damaged jackets are burned; club members may choose to be buried dressed in one.

Horton Smith's jacket, awarded for his wins in 1934 and 1936, sold at auction in September 2013 for over $682,000; the highest price ever paid for a piece of golf memorabilia. Smith died at age 55 in 1963 and it had been in the possession of his brother Ren's stepsons for decades.

The trademarked green shade is specified as Pantone 342.

== Caddies ==
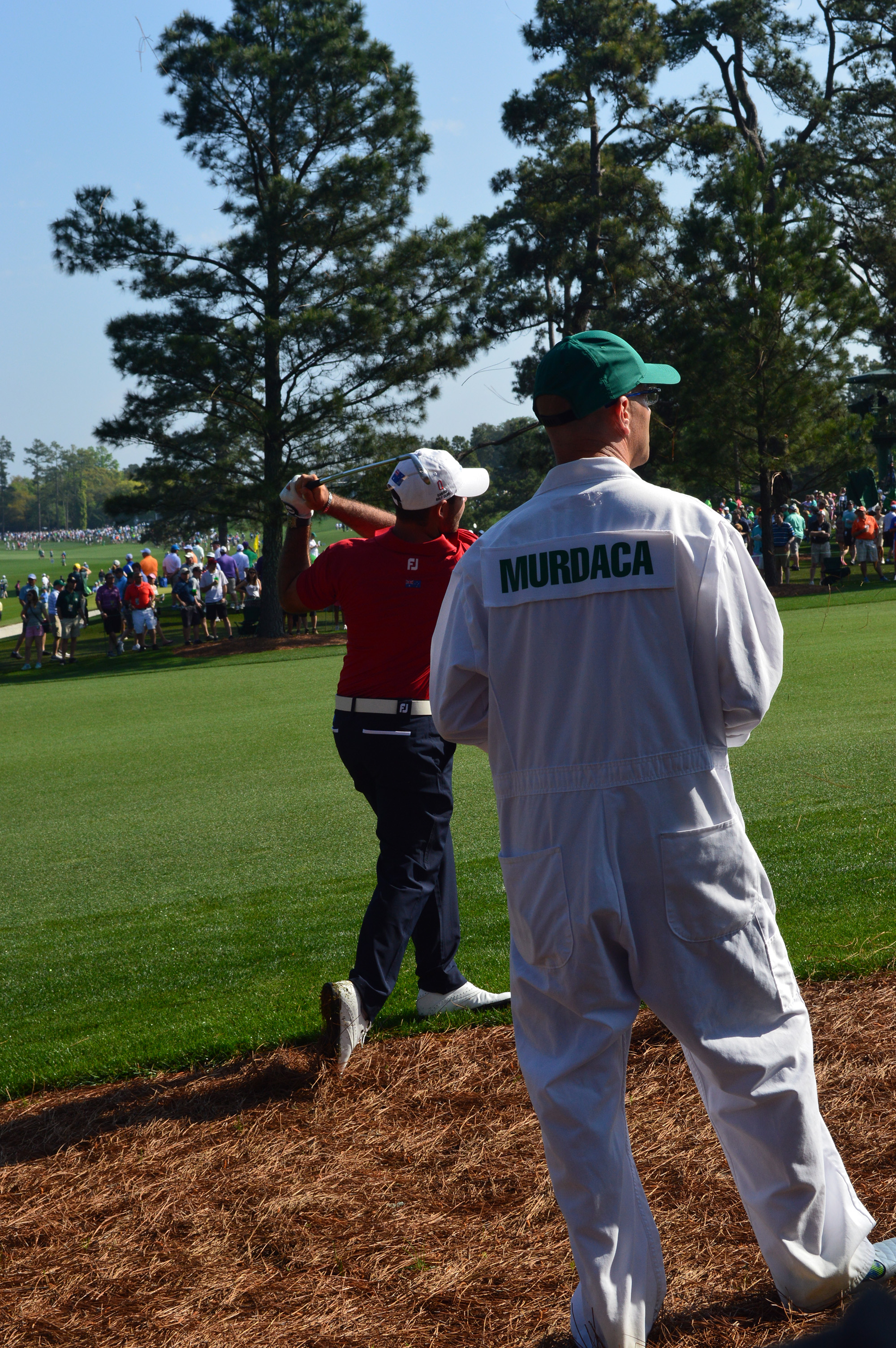
A caddie at the Masters (right) in white jumpsuit bearing player's name

Augusta National employs a staff of caddies to assist members, guests, and professionals. Augusta's caddie staff wears trademark white jumpsuits year-round.

Before 1983, staff caddies were assigned to players at the Masters. All four majors and some tour events required the use of the host club's caddies well into the 1970s—the U.S. Open had this policy through 1975—but by 1980, only the Masters and the Western Open near Chicago retained the requirement.

Well-known caddies during this time period include Nathaniel "Iron Man" Avery (four wins with Arnold Palmer), Jariah "Jerry" "Little Earl" Beard Sr., Carl Jackson, Eddie "E.B." McCoy Jr. (two wins with Gary Player), Willie "Pete" Peterson Jr. (five wins with Jack Nicklaus), Roosevelt "Benny" Smalley Sr. (three wins with Jimmy Demaret), Willie "Pappy" Stokes (five wins with four different golfers), and O'Bryant Williams (three wins with Sam Snead). Eisenhower always golfed with the same caddie, Willie "Cemetery" Perteet, when he visited Augusta.

More unusually, Augusta employed only black men as caddies. Club co-founder Clifford Roberts once said, "As long as I'm alive, all the golfers will be white and all the caddies will be black." Roberts killed himself at Augusta in 1977; five years later, in November 1982, chairman Hord Hardin announced that players were henceforth permitted to use their regular caddies at the Masters. The announcement arrived seven months after the 1982 tournament, during which many caddies, confused by a Thursday rain delay, failed to show up at the proper time on Friday morning; Hardin received scathing complaint letters from two-time champion Tom Watson and others. In 1983, 12 players employed club caddies, including then-five-time champion Jack Nicklaus, defending champion Craig Stadler, and future two-time champion Ben Crenshaw.

The first female caddie at Augusta was George Archer's daughter Elizabeth in 1983, her 21st event carrying the bag for her father. Archer, the 1969 champion, tied for twelfth, one of his better finishes at Augusta. Today, female caddies remain rare at Augusta and on the PGA Tour; most of the women caddies are professional golfers' regular caddies, such as Fanny Sunesson, who has caddied for several players at the Masters, most notably three-time champion Nick Faldo, and in 2019, Henrik Stenson.

During the pre-tournament events in 2007, Golf Channel's Kelly Tilghman caddied for Arnold Palmer in the par-3 contest. Fuzzy Zoeller's daughter Gretchen was his caddie for his last year as a competitor in the tournament in 2009. Tennis pro Caroline Wozniacki, then-fiancée of Rory McIlroy, caddied for him in the par-3 contests of 2013 and 2014.

Crenshaw won his 1984 and 1995 Masters titles with Augusta National caddie Carl Jackson.

Masters Tournament winners and caddies, 1934–1982
Year	Winner	Caddie	No.
1934	Horton Smith	Unknown	—N/a
1935	Gene Sarazen	John "Stovepipe" Gordon	—N/a
1936	Horton Smith	Unknown	—N/a
1937	Byron Nelson	Fred "Wheezy" Searles	—N/a
1938	Henry Picard	Willie "Pappy" Stokes	12
1939	Ralph Guldahl	Unknown	—N/a
1940	Jimmy Demaret	Roosevelt "Benny" Smalley Sr.	—N/a
1941	Craig Wood	Pearly Dawsey	30
1942	Byron Nelson	Fred "Wheezy" Searles (2)	12
1943–1945: World War II
1946	Herman Keiser	Thomas Evans	41
1947	Jimmy Demaret	Roosevelt "Benny" Smalley Sr. (2)	69
1948	Claude Harmon	Willie "Pappy" Stokes (2)	12
1949	Sam Snead	O'Bryant Williams	35
1950	Jimmy Demaret	Roosevelt "Benny" Smalley Sr. (3)	37
1951	Ben Hogan	Willie "Pappy" Stokes (3)	6
1952	Sam Snead	O'Bryant Williams (2)	42
1953	Ben Hogan	Willie "Pappy" Stokes (4)	2
1954	Sam Snead	O'Bryant Williams (3)	62
1955	Cary Middlecoff	Clarence "Eight-Ball" Harris	7
1956	Jack Burke Jr.	Willie "Pappy" Stokes (5)	8
1957	Doug Ford	George "Fireball" Franklin	57
1958	Arnold Palmer	Nathaniel "Iron Man" Avery	85
1959	Art Wall Jr.	Henry Hammond	83
1960	Arnold Palmer	Nathaniel "Iron Man" Avery (2)	13
1961	Gary Player	Ernest "Snipes" Nipper	52
1962	Arnold Palmer	Nathaniel "Iron Man" Avery (3)	13
1963	Jack Nicklaus	Willie "Pete" Peterson Jr.	49
1964	Arnold Palmer	Nathaniel "Iron Man" Avery (4)	82
1965	Jack Nicklaus	Willie "Pete" Peterson Jr. (2)	90
1966	Jack Nicklaus	Willie "Pete" Peterson Jr. (3)	90
1967	Gay Brewer	Johnny Frank Moore	6
1968	Bob Goalby	Frank "Marble Eye" Stokes	21
1969	George Archer	Frank "Skinny" Ware	63
1970	Billy Casper	Matthew "Shorty Mac" Palmer	34
1971	Charles Coody	Walter "Cricket" Pritchett	7
1972	Jack Nicklaus	Willie "Pete" Peterson Jr. (4)	16
1973	Tommy Aaron	Cleveland Randolph	68
1974	Gary Player	Eddie "E.B." McCoy Jr.	39
1975	Jack Nicklaus	Willie "Pete" Peterson Jr. (5)	76
1976	Raymond Floyd	Fred "Hop" Harrison	36
1977	Tom Watson	Leon McCladdie	26
1978	Gary Player	Eddie "E.B." McCoy Jr. (2)	52
1979	Fuzzy Zoeller	Jariah "Jerry" "Little Earl" Beard Sr.	48
1980	Seve Ballesteros	Marion "Waynesboro" Herrington Sr.	10
1981	Tom Watson	Leon McCladdie (2)	32
1982	Craig Stadler	Michael "Ben" Bussey	41

== Incidents ==
On October 22, 1983, Charles Harris, an unemployed local man, crashed his Dodge pickup truck through Gate 3 while President Ronald Reagan was on the golf course. Armed with a .38 caliber revolver, Harris took six people hostage in the Pro Shop: four employees and two White House staffers. Police and Secret Service agents placed a phone call to Harris and put the president on the line, but Harris thought it was a trick and hung up. Once Reagan had been evacuated from the club, Harris surrendered. He was later convicted of false imprisonment and sentenced to five years in prison. He claimed he meant no harm to the president and had only wanted to speak with him about unemployment issues.

== Appearances in video games ==
Augusta National was previously used in the 1986 computer game Mean 18, published by Accolade.

Augusta National Golf Club is featured in the Japan-exclusive video game franchise Harukanaru Augusta, which started in 1989. The games were produced by T&E Soft. One of its last titles, Masters '98: Harukanaru Augusta, was released for the Nintendo 64.

Augusta National Golf Club and the Masters Tournament are also featured in the video game Tiger Woods PGA Tour 12: The Masters, and have subsequently featured in later iterations of the game. This was the first time that the course was officially used in the Tiger Woods franchise. In 2021, EA Sports and Augusta National Golf Club announced plans to revive their PGA Tour series, which would once again feature Augusta National Golf Club and the Masters Tournament. In addition, EA also announced that the new game, EA Sports PGA Tour, will feature the other three majors—the PGA Championship, Open Championship, and the U.S. Open.
