= Carl Jackson (disambiguation) =

Carl Jackson (born 1953) is an American country and bluegrass musician.

Carl Jackson may also refer to:

- Carl Jackson (caddie), golf caddie at the Augusta National Golf Club
- Carl Jackson (organist) (born 1958), British organist and former director of music at the Chapel Royal, Hampton Court
- Carl W. Jackson, member of the Maryland House of Delegates
- Carl Jackson (American football) (born 1940), American football coach and player
