= Scott Ford =

Scott Ford may refer to:

- Scott Ford (ice hockey) (born 1979), Canadian ice hockey player
- Scott Ford (musician), American bassist, vocalist, and arranger
- Scott T. Ford, president and chief executive officer of Alltel

== See also ==
- Duncan Scott-Ford
