= Nathaniel "Iron Man" Avery =

American golf caddie (1939–1985)

- Born: 1939; Augusta, Georgia
- Died: May 3, 1985 (aged 46); Augusta, Georgia
- Resting place: Southview Cemetery; Augusta, Georgia; 33.44560°N 81.99970°W
- Occupation: Caddie
- Employer: Augusta National Golf Club

Nathaniel "Iron Man" Avery (1939 – May 3, 1985) was an African-American golf caddie at Augusta National Golf Club, famous for helping Arnold Palmer win four Masters titles in 1958, 1960, 1962, and 1964. His high public profile and visibility during Palmer's rise to fame made Avery one of the first caddies given attention by the media.

Avery was born in Augusta, Georgia, in 1939, the last of his parents' eight children. His older brother "Big Henry" Avery was caddie master at the Augusta Country Club, leading Avery himself to spend time at the caddie yard in his early teens. During this time in the early 1950s, Avery would often boast he could easily carry the heaviest bags, first earning him the nickname "Iron Man". (Note: Other rumors about the origin of Avery's nickname mention lost fingers, variously blaming a firecracker accident, a knife fight, or a bad swing with an ax. Masters legend says Avery always chose the right "iron, man". Avery told the AP in 1974, "Charlie Boy, who was also called Mutt, gave me that name, cause I was like an iron man on the course.") Avery began caddying for then-rookie Arnold Palmer in 1954 at the age of 16 – "Even though Ken Venturi was the heat," he would later tell the Augusta Chronicle.

Following Palmer's first win (and expected lunch with then-President Dwight D. Eisenhower) with Avery at the 1958 Masters Tournament, Palmer's wife Winnie meant to write a check to Avery for the then-standard $1,400 caddie fee, but in her haste instead wrote the amount as $14,000; Avery unsuccessfully tried to cash the check, calling her from Augusta National.

At the 1960 Masters Tournament, with Palmer down at the 15th hole, Avery asked, "Mr. Palmer, are we chokin'?" Palmer then shot two birdies on the 17th and 18th to win the tournament by a single stroke. Palmer would later remark:

[Avery's] understanding of what made me tick was perhaps instinctive and definitely profound. I stared back at him and realized he was right—I was foolishly beating on myself instead of taking care of the business of playing the golf course. His scowl was eerily reminiscent of the disapproving glare Pap used to give me as a kid whenever I threw a club or failed to keep my mind on the job.

After Palmer's win at the 1962 Masters Tournament, the Associated Press spoke with Avery, who described the scene:

He just hitch his trousers, jerk on his glove, starts walking fast and says, "The game is on." When Mr. Arnold do that, everybody better watch out. He's gonna stampede anything in his way. ... I been almost in his pocket on every hole. Sometime he goes with my advice – and it better be right. If I mis-club him, he don't chastise me. He just look a little mean, and I feel like going through the ground. But he is a great man. He just look up in the sky like he is wishing for some miracle to come down. And the miracle come down – like somebody was answering him.

Avery bought a new car with his earnings after each winning Masters Tournament with Palmer. He once totaled a Pontiac shortly after buying it, and told staff in the emergency room "I still got these $30 shoes." Avery collected $5,000 from Palmer across their four wins together. Palmer once said of Avery, "Most caddies on the tour are real quiet, but Iron Man and I have been together for so long that we kid around a little." Avery's nickname for Palmer was "Par". Fellow Augusta caddie Carl Jackson described Avery as a "real gambler, a ladies' man type of guy, not a family man".

Palmer wrote of Avery in his autobiography A Golfer's Life:

Iron Man wasn't the greatest caddie. I'd be less than honest if I said he was. His distances were often inaccurate, and I relied, instead, on my own calculations and the knowledge of the course to get around Augusta.

The 1965 Masters Tournament was less successful for Palmer, during which Avery complained that "We done cold hit it straight, but we ain't found the hole." After Jack Nicklaus won with a then-record 271, Avery remarked to Sports Illustrated, "That man not real." During the 1967 Masters Tournament, Avery did not caddy for Palmer; "I just didn't get here in time," said Avery, who was replaced by Charlie Reynolds.

Avery and Palmer's last tournament together was in 1968, and Palmer lost touch with Avery over time. In 1969, Avery told the AP, "I was with Arnie through four championships and then he let me down." By 1974, the AP found Avery "sad" and "lonely" in Augusta, having last worked as a caddie in 1971 and only able to find work at the Masters carrying equipment for a photographer. Avery told them "no man knows this course like me. I know every tree, every blade of grass, every break on the greens." Avery also said Palmer was "having his problems. He'll never make a comeback until he gets me back, you just watch and see." Avery also often spent winters in New York with relatives, and was briefly incarcerated in Richmond County Jail.

Avery's last time working for Augusta National was during the 1981–82 season; he died on May 3, 1985, in Augusta. In 2017, together with Avery's family and the Palmer Company, Avery's grave at Southview Cemetery in Augusta was finally marked with a headstone.

== See also ==
- Willie "Pappy" Stokes
