= Hord Hardin =

American lawyer and golf administrator (1912–1996)

- Born: January 3, 1912; St. Louis, Missouri, U.S.
- Died: August 5, 1996 (aged 84); Harbor Springs, Michigan, U.S.
- Known for: Chairman, Augusta National (1980–1991); President, USGA (1968–1969)

Chairman of Augusta National Golf Club
- In office 1978–1991
- Preceded by: William H. Lane
- Succeeded by: Jackson T. Stephens

Hord Wilson Hardin (January 3, 1912 – August 5, 1996) was the President of the United States Golf Association (USGA) from 1968 to 1969, then Chairman of the Masters Tournament and the Augusta National Golf Club from 1980 to 1991.

== Biography ==
Hardin was born in 1912 in St. Louis, Missouri and graduated from Washington University in St. Louis.

He worked as a lawyer. Later, he competed in six U.S. Amateurs between 1953 and 1963. He served as President of the USGA from 1968 to 1969, then Chairman of the Masters Tournament and the Augusta National Golf Club from 1980 to 1991. He was instrumental in the relocation of the Bellerive Country Club.

He died of a terminal illness in Harbor Springs, Michigan in 1996.
