= Champions Retreat Golf Club =

Private golf course in Georgia, US

Champions Retreat
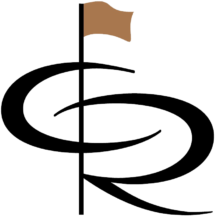

- Location within the United States Location within Georgia
- 33.597°N 82.16°W

Club information
- Location: Evans, Georgia, U.S.
- Elevation: 160–310 feet (50–95 m)
- Established: 2005, 21 years ago
- Type: Private
- Owner: Arcis Golf
- Tota holes: 27
- Tournaments: Augusta National Women's Amateur (2019–present)
- Greens: TifEagle Bermuda grass
- Fairways: Ryegrass
- Website: championsretreat.net
- Designed by: Arnold Palmer (Island), Gary Player (Creek), Jack Nicklaus (Bluff)
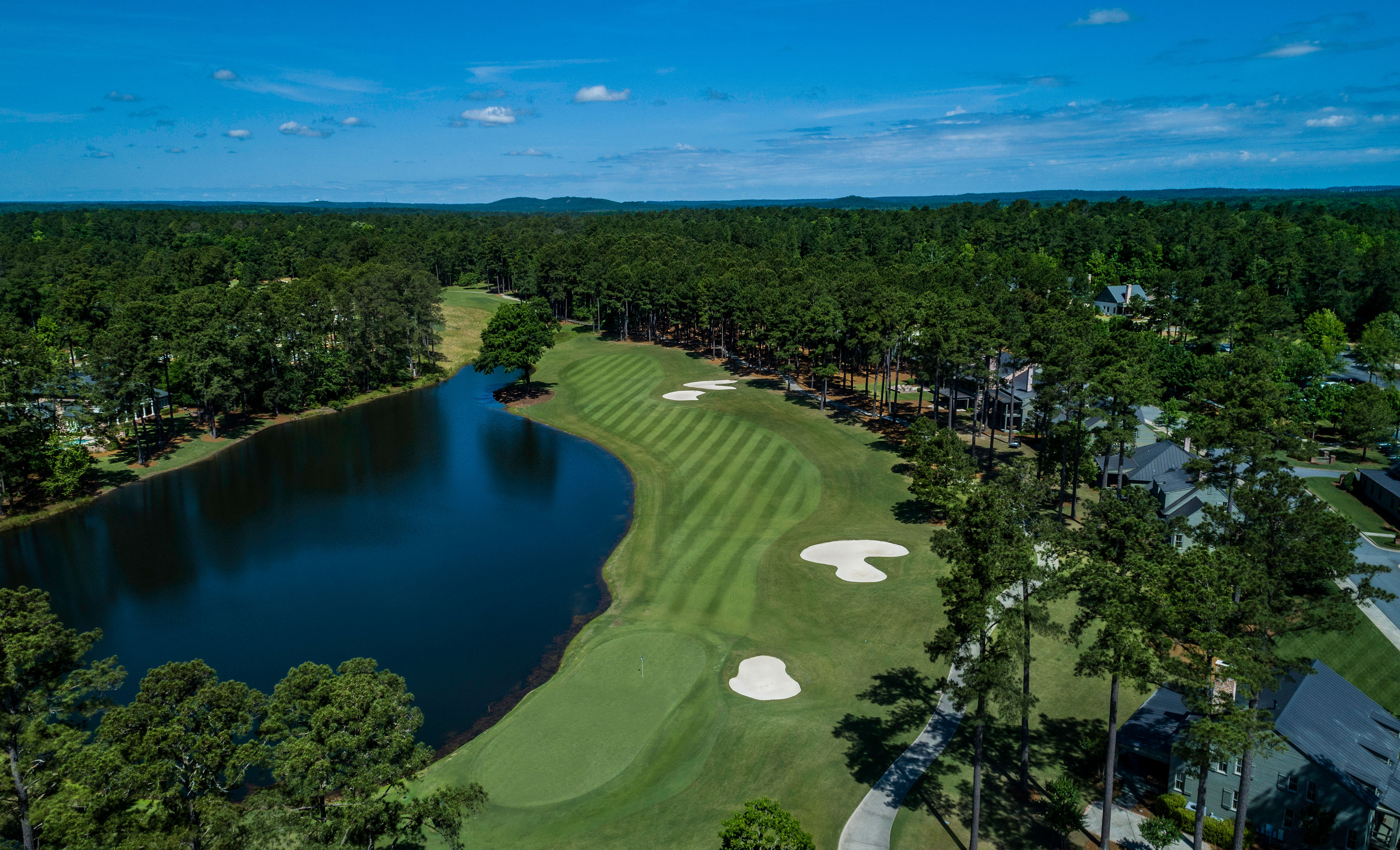
- Champions Retreat in 2019

Champions Retreat Golf Club is a 27-hole private golf club located in Evans, Georgia, United States, on a site 14 miles (23 km) from Augusta National Golf Club. It is the only course in the world with three nines designed by Jack Nicklaus, Arnold Palmer, and Gary Player, the "Big Three" of Masters fame, who combine for 13 Masters titles, 34 Major victories, and 159 tournament wins.

In 2019, the course began co-hosting the Augusta National Women's Amateur along with Augusta National.

== History ==
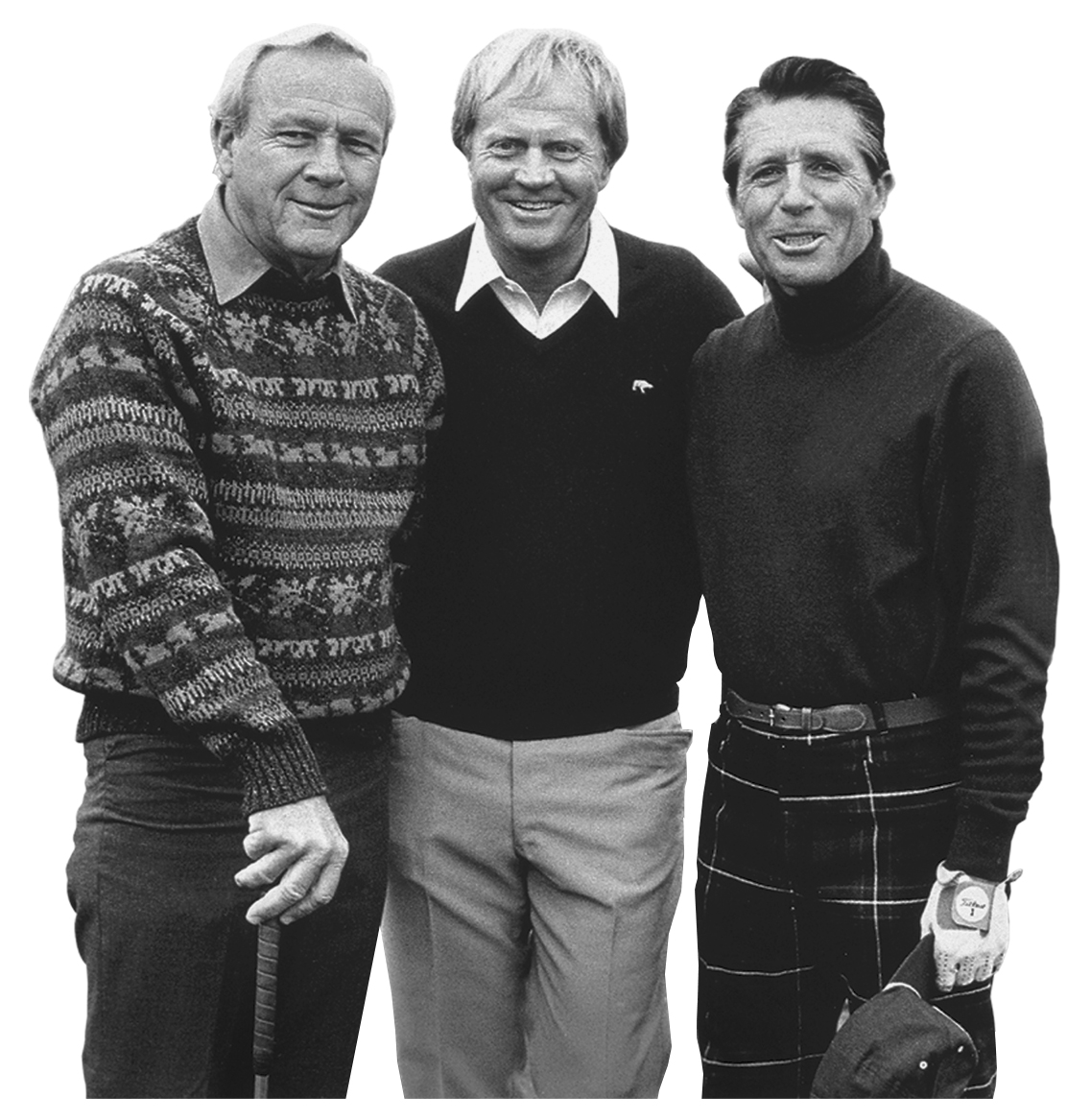
The Big Three of Golf - Arnold Palmer, Jack Nicklaus, and Gary Player (from left to right)

Legendary professional golfer Gary Player chose the 1999 Masters Champions Dinner as his setting to recruit two other greats – Jack Nicklaus and the late Arnold Palmer – to share in his dream of a 27-hole, private golf club located just outside of Augusta, Georgia. Nestled along the Savannah River, the three nine-hole courses inhabit a former untouched timber plot and are built around an Island, a Bluff, and a Creek.

They designed nine holes of championship golf together, sculpting from the foundation of more than 365 acres (148 ha) of skyward Georgia pines, long-standing hardwood, and wetlands. Opening its doors in 2005, Champions Retreat is the realization of their collective vision.

The three nine-hole courses inhabit a former untouched timber plot and are built around an Island, a Bluff, and a Creek. With three distinct properties to choose from, Gary Player handled the designation of the land by writing “Island,” “Creek” and “Bluff” on the back of three index cards. Arnold Palmer had the most seniority and had played in more Masters than Jack Nicklaus or Gary Player, so he selected first. He drew the “Island” card. Jack Nicklaus drew second since he had won more green jackets than Gary Player and pulled the “Bluff” card, leaving Player with the “Creek” property.

== Augusta National Women's Amateur ==
The Augusta National Women's Amateur (ANWA) was announced in April 2018 by Augusta National Chairman Fred Ridley during his annual press conference at the 2018 Masters Tournament. The 54-hole, stroke-play tournament features an international field of 72 amateur woman players. Invitees are determined by awarding winners of other recognized championships and using the Women's World Amateur Golf Ranking.

=== 2019 ===
In the inaugural event, Champions Retreat Golf Club hosted the first 36 holes over two days on Arnold Palmer’s Island nine and Jack Nicklaus’ Bluff nine. The entire field then plays Augusta National for an official practice round followed by the final round taking place at Augusta National. The final round features the top 30 competitors who made the cut. In the event of a tie after 54 holes, the winner will be decided by a sudden-death playoff.

NBC Sports provided pre-event promotion across NBCUniversal's portfolio, while Golf Channel delivered the highlights, live reports, and news coverage throughout the event, including onsite during the first two competitive rounds at Champions Retreat.

=== 2020 ===
The Augusta National Women's Amateur 2020 did not take place due to the COVID-19 pandemic.

=== 2021 ===
In a statement issued on January 12, 2021, Fred Ridley, Chairman of Augusta National Golf Club, announced that the club intended to conduct the Augusta National Women’s Amateur and the Drive, Chip, and Putt National Finals as scheduled. Both of these competitions also intend to host a small number of patrons. Augusta National Women's Amateur 2021 took place from March 31 to April 3.

Seventeen-year-old Tsubasa Kajitani became the first international ANWA champion, and the first winner from Japan at Augusta National in any tournament, with her playoff victory over Wake Forest's Emilia Migliaccio in 2021. The following week Japan's Hideki Matsuyama won the Masters.

=== 2022 ===
The Augusta National Women’s Amateur was held in 2022. The first 36 holes were contested over two days on the Island and Bluff nines at Champions Retreat Golf Club on March 30 and 31, 2022. The entire field then played Augusta National for an official practice round Friday, April 1. The final round took place at Augusta National on Saturday, April 2.

In her first appearance at the Augusta National Women's Amateur, 16-year-old Anna Davis became the event's youngest champion in 2022 by shooting a 3-under 69 to finish at 1 under and win by a single stroke.

=== 2023 ===
American Rose Zhang won the 2023 tournament after defeating Jenny Bae in a playoff.

== Facilities and grounds ==
Champions Retreat is acclaimed as one of the best golf properties in the United States. The property encompasses more than 365 acres (148 ha) of Georgia pines, long-standing hardwood, and wetlands.

=== Scorecards ===
The Bluff
Tee	Rating/Slope	1	2	3	4	5	6	7	8	9	Total
Black		432	185	423	467	555	340	407	227	579	3,615
Blue		391	153	383	431	521	319	367	176	526	3,267
Green		379	145	371	421	509	309	351	156	498	3,139
Gold		297	125	305	330	383	236	307	118	464	2,565
Par		4	3	4	4	5	4	4	3	5	36

The Creek
Tee	Rating/Slope	1	2	3	4	5	6	7	8	9	Total
Black		471	193	452	210	527	349	407	540	449	3,589
Blue		448	177	426	184	485	325	367	496	417	3,325
Green		428	167	386	168	465	315	351	441	360	3,081
Gold		365	103	323	142	350	272	307	387	307	2,556
Par		4	3	4	3	5	4	4	5	4	36

The Island
Tee	Rating/Slope	1	2	3	4	5	6	7	8	9	Total
Black		431	468	542	453	440	180	328	192	586	3,620
Blue		391	431	486	420	408	165	291	177	547	3,316
Green		372	392	469	400	386	155	272	129	530	3,105
Gold		329	330	421	321	327	140	239	106	474	2,687
Par		4	4	5	4	4	3	4	3	5	36

=== Island ===
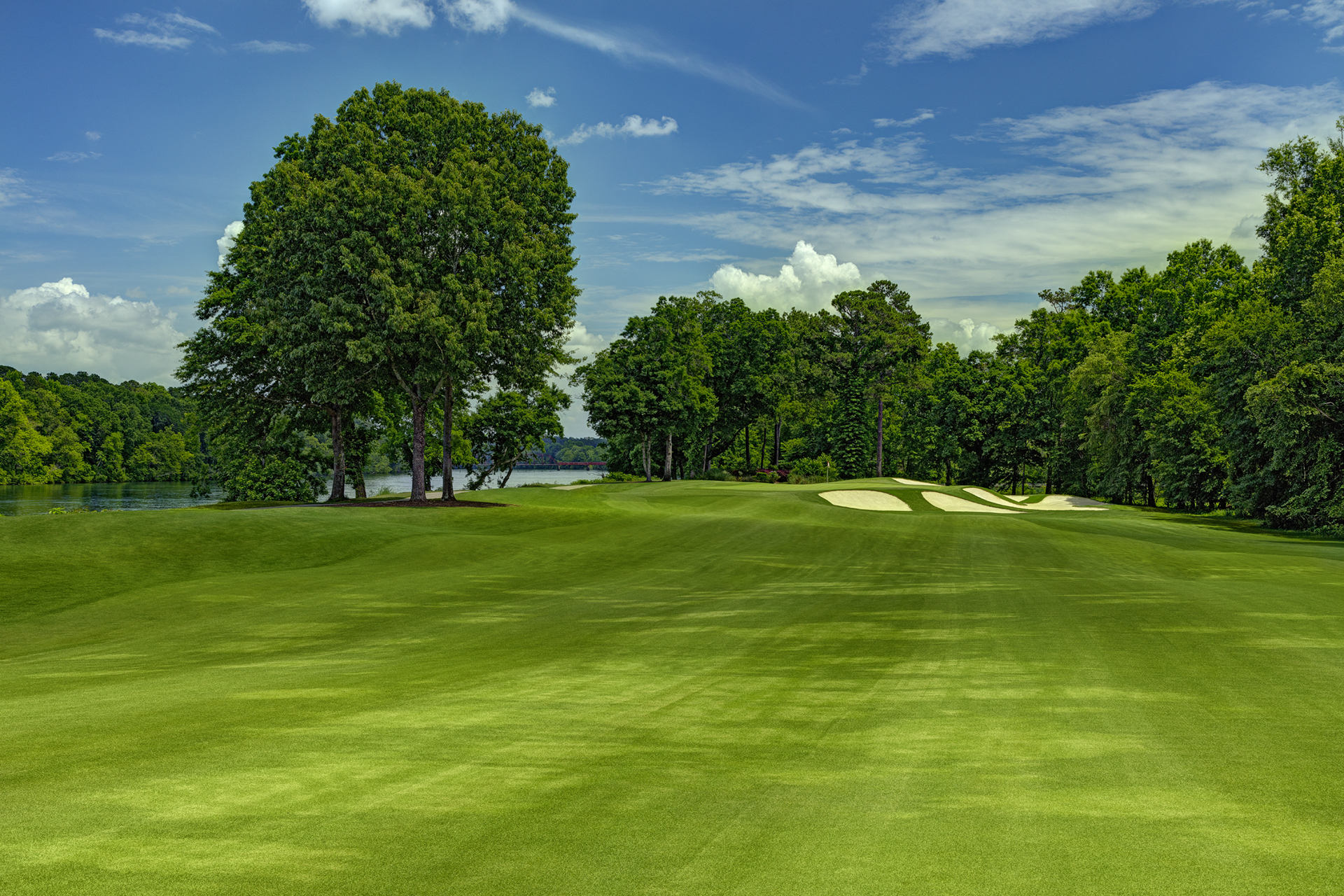
5th hole of the Island Course

The Island Nine at Champions Retreat shares the personality of Arnold Palmer’s architectural vision. The course is flanked on one side by the broad Savannah River and on the other by the Little River. The hardwoods and pines along the riverbank have been preserved, and the fairways have been raised to take advantage of the vistas overlooking the marshy waters.

=== Bluff ===
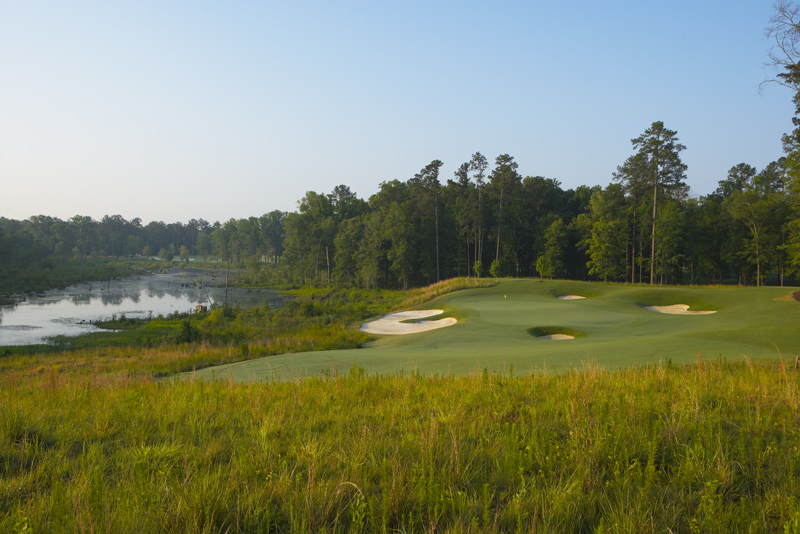
8th hole of the Bluff Course

Designed by Jack Nicklaus, The Bluff course features numerous mounds and rolling hills, with mature Georgia pines spread throughout. Very little dirt was moved during the construction process allowing the course to fit within the existing terrain and its surroundings. There is a great deal of variety in the routing, featuring uphill and downhill shots, as well as a balance of right-to-left and left-to-right holes.

=== Creek ===
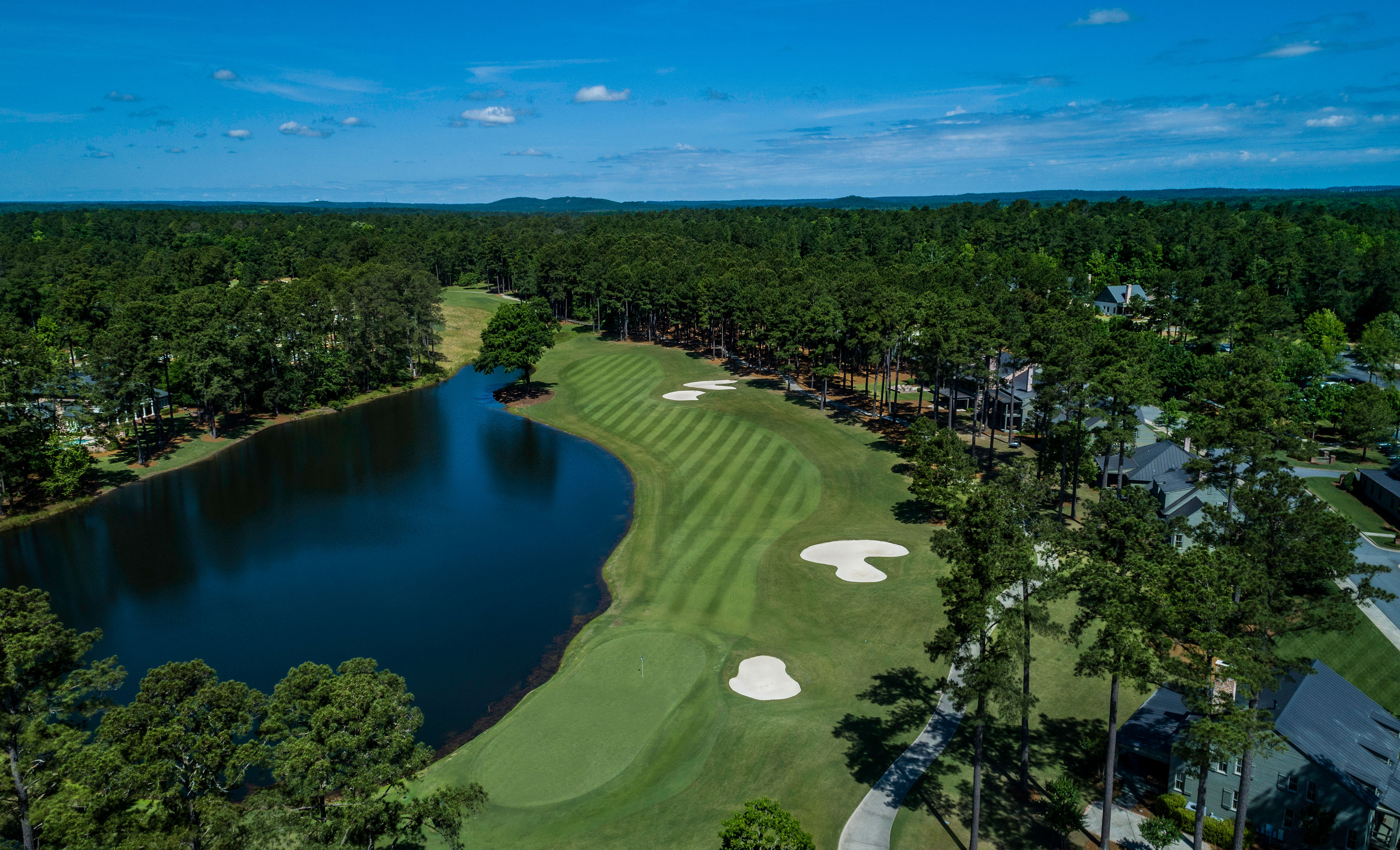
9th hole of the Creek Course

The Creek course provides many opportunities for an experienced golfer. Designed by Gary Player, the opening four holes play in a wetland area while the remaining part of the course moves upland through native hardwood trees. Adding difficulty, the ninth plays over and around a large lake on the right, allowing players to finish with a variety of shots.
