= William H. Lane =

American golf administrator (1912–1996)

- Born: William Homer Lane; November 22, 1923; Maryville, Tennessee, United States
- Died: June 28, 1980 (aged 56); Houston, Texas
- Education: University of Tennessee (1947)
- Occupation: Businessman
- Known for: CEO of Riviana Foods; chair of the Masters
- Spouse: Dorothy Lane
- Children: 3

Chairman of Augusta National Golf Club
- In office April 11, 1976 – 1978
- Preceded by: Clifford Roberts
- Succeeded by: Hord Hardin

William "Bill" Homer Lane (November 22, 1923 – June 28, 1980) was an American business executive who was CEO of Riviana Foods and a director at Colgate-Palmolive. He also served as the second chairman of Augusta National Golf Club and The Masters from 1976 to 1978.

== Early life and business ==
William Homer Lane was born on November 22, 1923 to father William Quincy Lane; he had a brother, Richard. Lane was raised in Maryville, Tennessee, where he attended Maryville High School and was quarterback on the football team. He also took up golf at the age of 12, playing at Green Meadow Country Club. During World War II, Lane served as a naval officer. He studied at the University of Tennessee (class of 1947), where he was a member of Sigma Chi, and Georgia Tech. In 1960, Lane moved to Houston to work for Riviana Foods, then known as River Brand Rice Mills, where he became CEO and president. Lane oversaw in 1968 Riviana's majority acquisition of Hebrew National.

Lane was a trustee of Rice University from 1972 and a director at the Texas Commerce Bank and Colgate-Palmolive.

Lane supported Texas Democratic senator Lloyd Bentsen, and was campaign chairman for Bentsen's 1976 presidential run.

== Augusta National ==
In Houston, Lane was a member of River Oaks Country Club. He was also a member of East Lake Golf Club in Atlanta, where he came to know course native Bobby Jones. In 1964, Lane was invited by Jones to join Augusta National Golf Club. Twelve years later, Lane was Clifford Roberts's handpicked successor to be chairman of both Augusta National Golf Club and The Masters. He officially assumed the role at the end of the 1976 Masters Tournament, but suffered an intracranial aneurysm and was hospitalized in 1979, during the week of that year's tournament. Lane was temporarily replaced by Augusta vice-chair Hord Hardin, but his health never recovered, and Hardin was named permanent chairman in 1980. Roberts had expected Lane would hold the position for at least 25 years.

== Personal life and death ==
Lane married his wife, Dorothy, at First Presbyterian Church in Knoxville, and they had three children: William Jr., Peggy, and Timothy.

Lane died in Houston on June 28, 1980 at the age of 56. The William H. Lane Neurological Fund at Houston Methodist Hospital was named in his honor by Dorothy Lane.

Dorothy died on March 24, 2016, having remarried following Lane's death.
