= Joe T. Ford =

American businessman

- Born: Joe Thomas Ford; June 24, 1937 (age 89); Conway, Arkansas, U.S.
- Education: University of Arkansas (BSBA)
- Occupations: Businessman; politician
- Title: Chairman of Alltel (1991‍–‍2007); Chief executive officer of Alltel (1987‍–‍2002); President and chief operating officer of Alltel (1983‍–‍1987)
- Political party: Democratic (until c. 1990s); Republican (since c. 1990s)
- Children: 2, including Scott

Member of the Arkansas Senate
- In office January 9, 1967 – January 10, 1983
- Preceded by: Charles L. George
- Succeeded by: Doug Brandon
- Constituency: 18th district (1967‍–‍1973); 4th district (1973‍–‍1983)

Joe Thomas Ford (born June 24, 1937) is a former chief executive officer and co-founder of Alltel, a global communications company.

Ford was born in Conway, Arkansas, on June 24, 1937. He graduated from the University of Arkansas in 1959 with a Bachelor of Science in Business Administration. While attending Arkansas, he was a member of the Pi Kappa Alpha fraternity.

Ford went to work for Allied Telephone Company upon his graduation from college. Allied subsequently merged with Mid-Continent Telephone Corporation in 1983. The name of the newly expanded corporation was changed to Alltel, and Mr. Ford became its first President. Ford was promoted to CEO in 1987, and eventually became chairman of the board in 1991.

Under his leadership, Allied (now Alltel) grew from a predominantly rural Arkansas-based land line telephone company to a telecommunications giant with over 15 million customers and $10 billion in annual revenue.

Ford is the vice chairman of Augusta National Golf Club, and a co-founder of Westrock Coffee Company.
