= Augusta National Women's Amateur =

American golf tournament

Coordinates: 33.503°N 82.020°W

Tournament information
- Location: Augusta, Georgia, U.S.
- Established: 2019
- Courses: Augusta National Golf Club (final round); Champions Retreat Golf Club (first 36 holes, in Evans) (Island & Bluff nines)
- Par: 72
- Length: 6,365 yards (5,820 m)
- Organized by: Augusta National Golf Club
- Format: Stroke play – 54 holes
- Month played: April
- Website: anwagolf.com

Tournament record score
- Aggregate: 202 María José Marín (2026)
- To par: −14 as above

Current champion
- (Colombia) María José Marín

Location in the United States
Location in Georgia

The Augusta National Women's Amateur (ANWA) is a golf tournament in Georgia, held at Augusta National Golf Club in Augusta and Champions Retreat Golf Club in nearby Evans. The 54-hole stroke play event debuted in 2019.

The tournament is split between the two venues, with Champions Retreat hosting the opening rounds on Wednesday and Thursday with a field size of 72 players on the Island and Bluff nines. The field is cut to the top 30 players (with a playoff for the last spots if necessary) for the final round Saturday at Augusta National. A practice round is played on Friday at Augusta National with the full field. The tournament is held on the week directly preceding the Masters Tournament.

The winner of the tournament receives invitations to the next five ANWAs, that year's U.S. Women's Open and Women's British Open, and any USGA, R&A, and PGA of America amateur events for which she is otherwise eligible prior to the next ANWA—all providing she remains an amateur.

== Background ==
Until 2012, Augusta National refused to formally admit women as members. Before the 2012 Masters Tournament, then-chairman William Porter Payne cited that in 2011, more than 15% of the non-tournament rounds were played by female players who were member guests or spouses of active members. On August 20, 2012, Augusta National admitted Condoleezza Rice and Darla Moore as its first female members.

Prior to the 2018 Masters Tournament, new Augusta National chairman Fred Ridley announced on April 4 that the club would host the Augusta National Women's Amateur beginning in 2019. He stated that holding such an event at Augusta National would have the "greatest impact" on women's golf.

Concerns were raised that the event would conflict with the LPGA Tour's first major, the ANA Inspiration (which has invited top amateur players to compete), Ridley stated that he had discussed the event with commissioner Mike Whan, and stated that he agreed on the notion that any move to bolster the prominence of women's golf would be a "win" for the LPGA over time. In 2021, as part of a new sponsorship agreement with Chevron Corporation, the ANA Inspiration was renamed The Chevron Championship, and was relocated to The Woodlands, Texas with a new, later scheduling beginning 2023.

== History ==
The inaugural tournament in 2019 was highlighted by a final round duel between eventual winner Jennifer Kupcho and María Fassi. Kupcho pulled away from Fassi by going five-under over the final six holes, winning by four strokes with a score of -10. Kupcho's back-nine performance included an eagle on the thirteenth hole. As with those who score an eagle during the Masters proper, Kupcho received a pair of inscribed crystal glasses for her achievement.

The 2020 tournament was cancelled due to the COVID-19 pandemic (which caused the 2020 Masters Tournament to likewise be rescheduled to November). All players invited to the tournament were invited back for 2021, provided that they were still an amateur at the time of the tournament.

== Courses ==
=== Champions Retreat Golf Club ===
Hole	Yards	Par	Hole	Yards	Par
1	385	4	10	385	4
2	390	4	11	150	3
3	485	5	12	375	4
4	410	4	13	375	4
5	385	4	14	515	5
6	155	3	15	325	4
7	325	4	16	390	4
8	160	3	17	175	3
9	475	5	18	500	5
Out	3,170	36	In	3,190	36
Source:			Total	6,360	72

=== Augusta National Golf Club ===
Hole	Name	Yards	Par	Hole	Name	Yards	Par
1	Tea Olive	365	4	10	Camellia	450	4
2	Pink Dogwood	515	5	11	White Dogwood	400	4
3	Flowering Peach	340	4	12	Golden Bell	145	3
4	Flowering Crab Apple	170	3	13	Azalea	455	5
5	Magnolia	400	4	14	Chinese Fir	380	4
6	Juniper	165	3	15	Firethorn	475	5
7	Pampas	330	4	16	Redbud	145	3
8	Yellow Jasmine	480	5	17	Nandina	370	4
9	Carolina Cherry	395	4	18	Holly	385	4
Out		3,160	36	In		3,205	36
Source:				Total		6,365	72

- For the Masters Tournament in 2018, the course was set at 7,435 yards (6,799 m).

== Winners ==
Year	Dates	Champion	Winning score	To par	Margin of victory	Runner(s)-up
2026	Apr 4	(Colombia) María José Marín	65-69-68=202	−14	4 strokes	(Spain) Andrea Revuelta
2025	Apr 5	(Spain) Carla Bernat Escuder	68-68-68=204	−12	1 stroke	(United States) Asterisk Talley
2024	Apr 6	(England) Lottie Woad	68-71-69=208	−8	1 stroke	(United States) Bailey Shoemaker
2023	Apr 1	(United States) Rose Zhang	66-65-76=207	−9	Playoff	(United States) Jenny Bae
2022	Apr 2	(United States) Anna Davis	70-76-69=215	−1	1 stroke	(Sweden) Ingrid Lindblad (United States) Latanna Stone
2021	Apr 3	(Japan) Tsubasa Kajitani	73-72-72=217	+1	Playoff	(United States) Emilia Migliaccio
2020	Cancelled due to COVID-19 pandemic					
2019	Apr 6	(United States) Jennifer Kupcho	68-71-67=206	−10	4 strokes	(Mexico) María Fassi

== Media coverage ==
The final round of the tournament is televised by NBC.
