= Gloria Cabe =

American politician (born 1941)

Member of the Arkansas House of Representatives
- In office January 10, 1983 – January 14, 1991
- Preceded by: Doug Brandon
- Succeeded by: Mark Pryor
- Constituency: 59th district
- In office January 8, 1979 – January 12, 1981
- Preceded by: Doug Brandon
- Succeeded by: Doug Brandon
- Constituency: 4th district

Personal details
- Born: Gloria Sue Burford; September 15, 1941 (age 84) Pine Bluff, Arkansas, U.S.
- Party: Democratic
- Spouse: Robert Dudley Cabe
- Education: Hendrix College (BA)

Gloria Burford Cabe (born September 15, 1941) was an American politician and political advisor. After serving a number of terms in the Arkansas House of Representatives, she managed the successful 1990 gubernatorial campaign of Bill Clinton and later served as his chief of staff.

== Early life ==
Cabe was born in Pine Bluff, Arkansas to William Burford and Eva Elizabeth Owen and attended Hendrix College where she earned a BA in French in 1963. Her husband Robert Cabe, later a prominent attorney, also graduated from Hendrix.

== Career ==
After working a few years as a teacher and librarian, in 1967 Cabe was named to the Arkansas Constitutional Revision Study Commission. She was a member of the Arkansas legislature from 1979-1980 and served a second term from 1983-1990.

Cabe later served as Counselor to the Chairman of the United States Export-Import Bank under Bill Clinton and George W. Bush. She was also senior advisor to Secretary Hillary Clinton in the United States Department of State Global Partnership Initiative.
