= Doug Brandon =

American politician

Member of the Arkansas Senate from the 23rd district
- In office January 10, 1983 – January 14, 1991
- Preceded by: Joe T. Ford
- Succeeded by: Vic Snyder

Member of the Arkansas House of Representatives
- In office January 12, 1981 – January 10, 1983
- Preceded by: Gloria Cabe
- Succeeded by: Gloria Cabe
- Constituency: 4th district
- In office January 10, 1977 – January 8, 1979
- Preceded by: William F. Sherman
- Succeeded by: Gloria Cabe
- Constituency: 4th district
- In office January 14, 1963 – January 13, 1975
- Succeeded by: William F. Sherman
- Constituency: Pulaski County (1963‍–‍1967); 22nd district (1967‍–‍1973); 4th district (1973‍–‍1975)

Personal details
- Born: Benton Douglas Brandon Jr. August 23, 1932 Little Rock, Arkansas, U.S.
- Died: July 13, 1992 (aged 59)
- Party: Democratic
- Spouse: Elizabeth Riggs
- Education: University of Arkansas

Military service
- Branch/service: United States Army
- Rank: Major

Benton Douglas Brandon Jr. (August 23, 1932 – July 13, 1992) was an American lawyer and politician. He served in both the Arkansas House of Representatives and Arkansas Senate. In 1978, he was the Democratic nominee for Congress in Arkansas's 2nd congressional district.
