= Southview Cemetery =

Cemetery in Augusta, Georgia, US

Coordinates: 33.4456°N 81.9997°W

- Interactive map of Southview Cemetery

Details
- Established: 1910s
- Location: 1102 Nellieville Rd and 15th Avenue, Augusta, Georgia
- Size: 15 acres (6.1 ha)

Southview Cemetery is a cemetery in Augusta, Georgia in an area known as "The Avenues". The area became a 15-acre-wide (6.1 ha) cemetery in the 1910s.

== History ==
As other cemeteries were at maximum capacity, and were being closed by the city, the need of more space for burials was desperately needed. Due to the growth of the city a 15-acre parcel was privately purchased for a cemetery in the 1910s.

== Features ==
A unique feature of this cemetery is that people were placed in the ground by having the vault level to the surface of the ground, similar to Bayous of Louisiana and Mississippi.

Some of the areas have the vaults in tight rows that maximize space and minimize the landscaping needs. This part of the cemetery is from the 1950s to the 1980s. People were buried in order of death and availability of row space, family members could have been separated by many other deceased persons.

Some deceased families were able to purchase headstones. While some were not able to do so, they would paint the tops of the vaults so they could find their family members. This is a feature seen throughout the entire cemetery. The practice of placing the vault at the surface of the ground has been discontinued since the late 1980s.

In other parts of the cemetery, families purchased entire family size plots. Some of the areas of this cemetery is in a non-perpetual care and the families take care of their burial sites. There is now a perpetual care area. The cemetery has been privately held since its opening. As of 2016, people are still being buried in the cemetery.

== Notable interments ==
- Nathaniel "Iron Man" Avery (1939 – May 3, 1985), golf caddie at Augusta National Golf Club
