= Clifford Roberts =

American investment dealer, golf administrator

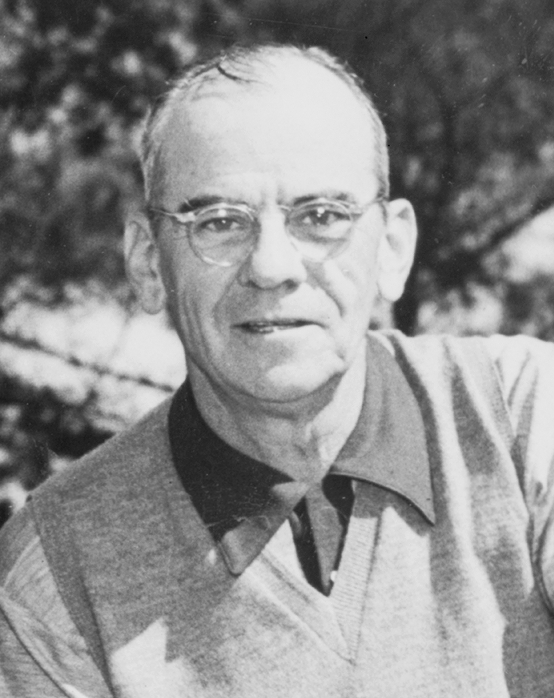
- Clifford Roberts in 1953
- Born: Charles DeClifford Roberts, Jr. March 6, 1894; Morning Sun, Iowa, US
- Died: September 29, 1977 (aged 83); Augusta, Georgia, US
- Occupations: Investment banker, golf administrator
- Known for: Augusta National Golf Club; Masters Tournament
- Spouse(s): 3 widow: Betty Roberts

Chairman of Augusta National Golf Club
- In office 1931 – April 11, 1976
- Succeeded by: William H. Lane

Clifford Roberts (March 6, 1894 – September 29, 1977) was an American investment dealer and golf administrator.

== Early life ==
Roberts was born in Morning Sun, Iowa. Roberts had a financially troubled family life as a boy. He and older brother, John Darious Roberts, left school before graduation after beating up the school's principal.

== Early career ==
He worked as a successful traveling clothing salesman, then as a promoter of speculative oil and gas leases and production. A large commission in the oil and gas industry, made in 1921, provided the financial means to become a Wall Street stock broker. He became a partner at Reynolds & Company in the late 1920s, a position he held for the remainder of his life.

== Augusta National Golf Club ==
In 1932, Roberts and Bobby Jones co-founded the Augusta National Golf Club in Augusta, Georgia. Roberts served as chairman of the club from 1931 through 1976.

Two years after its foundation, in 1934, Roberts and Jones started the Masters Tournament (played annually at Augusta National), personally extending invitations to the tournament. Roberts served as Chairman of the Masters Tournament from 1934 through 1976. He was succeeded by William H. Lane.

Roberts was named "Chairman in Memoriam" after his death.

Roberts' friendship with President Dwight Eisenhower led to the Eisenhowers making Augusta National their retreat during the 1950s.

Roberts was sometimes described as a "benevolent dictator" and during his tenure he did not hesitate to take swift, stern action against anyone whose words or deeds he believed could tarnish the club's image, no matter how slight. An example of this occurred at the end of the Monday playoff in 1966 when CBS commentator Jack Whitaker referred to the energetic crowd on the 18th fairway following the three players as a "mob" – Whitaker was subsequently banned by Roberts until 1972.

According to The New York Times, another comment attributed to Roberts is: "As long as I'm alive, all the golfers will be white and all the caddies will be black." The club had long-standing policies of hiring only black caddies and requiring their exclusive use at all times, including at the Masters tournament. Masters participants were not permitted to use their own caddies on Augusta National grounds until several years after Roberts' death.

The Masters Tournament, an invitational event, excluded black players for four decades, with Roberts once quoted as saying "to admit a black only because he was black would be practicing discrimination in reverse." Nevertheless, in 1975—whilst Roberts was still chairman—Lee Elder qualified for the Masters to become its first black competitor, and the first black person to play a round of golf at Augusta National. In 1997, Tiger Woods became the first person of color to win the tournament.

It was not until 1990, thirteen years after Roberts stepped down as chairman, that Augusta National admitted an African American member, Ron Townsend. The first woman, former Secretary of State Condoleezza Rice, was admitted in 2012.

== Death ==
At age 83, Roberts had been in ill health for several months with cancer, and had a debilitating stroke. On September 29, 1977, a year after stepping down, Roberts died of suicide by gunshot on the banks of Ike's Pond at Augusta. His mother, Rebecca Roberts, had died of suicide by gunshot wound in 1913. Several weeks after his death, a bronze plaque in his honor was unveiled at the clubhouse entrance.

At his death, Roberts was worth over $100 million. He left the bulk of his estate to Planned Parenthood. He is reported to have disliked children and once denied admission to Augusta National to a father of five children. He is reported to have said that "anyone stupid enough" to have that many offspring "isn't smart enough to belong to Augusta National."

== Legacy ==
Roberts received many awards and honors during his lifetime, including service on the PGA Advisory Committee from its inception in 1943 until his death, appointment by the United States Golf Association to serve on the Bob Jones Award Selection Committee, and election to the World Golf Hall of Fame in 1978.

Roberts was the subject of a book titled The Making of the Masters: Clifford Roberts, Augusta National, and Golf's Most Prestigious Tournament by David Owen, published in 1999.
