= Carl Jackson (caddie) =

American golf caddie

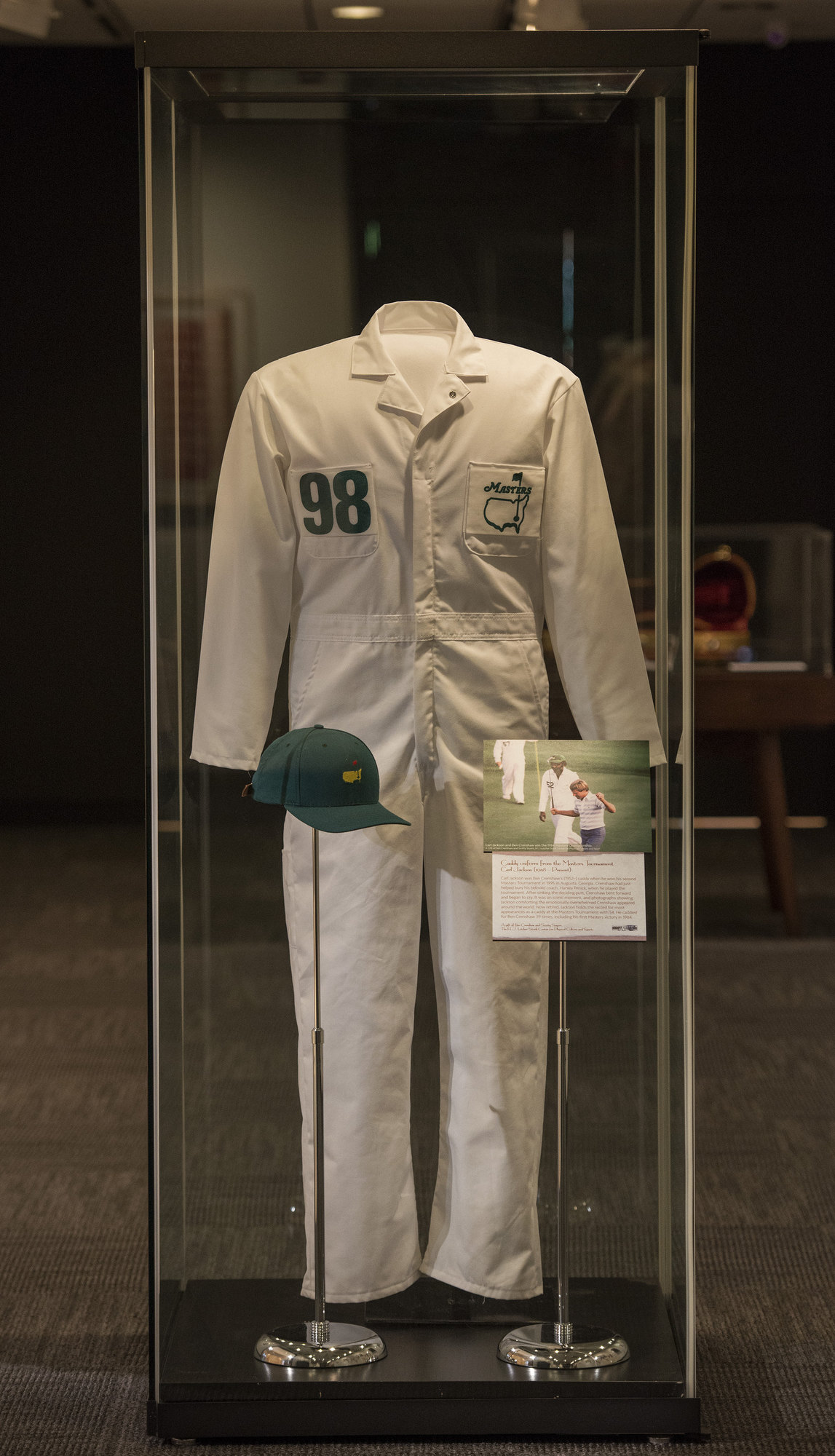
A caddy uniform worn by Jackson when he caddied for Ben Crenshaw in the Masters Tournament.

Carl "Skillet" Jackson is an African-American golf caddie who served at the Augusta National Golf Club. He caddied at every Masters Tournament (except one) between 1961 and 2010, then holding the record for the most appearances, at 54. He has caddied for Ben Crenshaw 39 times, including the two occasions that he won the tournament.

== Career ==
Jackson started caddying at Augusta National in 1958 and caddied for the first time at the Masters Tournament at the age of 14 in 1961, caddying for Billy Burke. In 1964, he caddied for Bruce Devlin, who finished fourth that year and in 1970 for Gary Player when he finished third. He first caddied for Crenshaw in 1976, when Crenshaw finished second, and continued to caddie for Crenshaw at the Masters until 1983 when Augusta National dropped the requirement that players use its caddies. Crenshaw kept Jackson on as caddie. Crenshaw won the Masters Tournament twice while Jackson was his caddie, once in 1984 and then again in 1995. Jackson was supposed to caddie for Crenshaw in the 2015 Masters, but had to pull out on Thursday morning due to sore ribs. Jackson's younger brother, Bud, caddied for Crenshaw instead. Jackson greeted and gave an emotional hug to Crenshaw after Crenshaw finished the 18th hole on Friday. Crenshaw announced the 2015 Masters, his 44th, would be his last.

== Personal life ==
Jackson left school at the age of 13 to help support his family and as his mother was unable to afford the cost of the uniform at the A. R. Johnson Magnet School which he ended up attending for only one day. He claims that in 1988 he was the first official black guest at Augusta National when a member asked him to play as no other members were present. He suffered from colon cancer in 2000, resulting in him missing the Masters Tournament for the first time since his first tournament, although by the next year he was back caddying for Crenshaw. He has recently started the Carl's Kids Foundation to attempt to take golf to children in the inner city of Little Rock, Arkansas.
