= Scott T. Ford =

American chief executive

Scott T. Ford was president and chief executive officer of Alltel from 2002 to 2009.

== Life ==
A graduate of the University of Arkansas, Ford worked for Merrill Lynch and Stephens Inc. In 1996 he joined Alltel as executive vice president with responsibility for Alltel's communications businesses and the corporate staff. He was named president in 1997, assumed the additional duties of chief operating officer in 1998, and was named chief executive officer in 2002. After selling Alltel to Verizon for $28 billion in 2007, Ford joined the advisory council of Rwandan President Paul Kagame.

Alltel was the fifth largest U.S. wireless provider. Ford was a director of the Little Rock Branch of the Federal Reserve Bank of St. Louis and on the board of directors for Tyson Foods, Inc., and the Cellular Telecommunications and Internet Association (CTIA). In 2007, he received an honorary doctorate from The King's College. In 2009, he was named to The King's College's board of trustees.

In June, 2012 Ford joined AT&T's board of directors.

Scott and his father Joe T. Ford formed Westrock Group, which maintains and operates businesses in alternative investment management and coffee, including exporting, trading, roasting, and hospitality.
